= List of postal codes of Canada: S =

This is a list of postal codes in Canada where the first letter is S. Postal codes beginning with S are located within the Canadian province of Saskatchewan. Only the first three characters are listed, corresponding to the Forward Sortation Area (FSA).

Canada Post provides a free postal code look-up tool on its website, via its mobile apps for such smartphones as the iPhone and BlackBerry, and sells hard-copy directories and CD-ROMs. Many vendors also sell validation tools, which allow customers to properly match addresses and postal codes. Hard-copy directories can also be consulted in all post offices, and some libraries.

== Saskatchewan ==
There are currently 53 FSAs in this list. Currently there are no S1*, S5* or S8* codes.

=== Urban ===
S2A; Not assigned	S3A; Not assigned	S4A; Estevan	S6A; Not assigned	S7A; RM of Aberdeen	S9A; North Battleford
S2B; Not assigned	S3B; Not assigned	S4B; Not assigned	S6B; Not assigned	S7B; Saskatoon (Tuscan Ridge)	S9B; Not assigned
S2C; Not assigned	S3C; Not assigned	S4C; Not assigned	S6C; Not assigned	S7C; Saskatoon (Shields / Thode / Midnight Sun Estates / Skyview Estates)	S9C; Not assigned
S2E; Not assigned	S3E; Not assigned	S4E; Not assigned	S6E; Not assigned	S7E; Not assigned	S9E; Not assigned
S2G; Not assigned	S3G; Not assigned	S4G; Not assigned	S6G; Not assigned	S7G; Not assigned	S9G; Not assigned
S2H; Not assigned	S3H; Not assigned	S4H; Weyburn	S6H; Moose Jaw; Southeast	S7H; Saskatoon; East Central	S9H; Swift Current
S2J; Not assigned	S3J; Not assigned	S4J; Not assigned	S6J; Moose Jaw; Northeast	S7J; Saskatoon; South Central	S9J; Not assigned
S2K; Not assigned	S3K; Not assigned	S4K; Regina (Rural Municipality of Sherwood)	S6K; Moose Jaw; West	S7K; Saskatoon; North Central	S9K; Not assigned
S2L; Not assigned	S3L; Not assigned	S4L; Regina and White City; East	S6L; Not assigned	S7L; Saskatoon; West (YXE)	S9L; Not assigned
S2M; Not assigned	S3M; Not assigned	S4M; Regina	S6M; Not assigned	S7M; Saskatoon; Southwest	S9M; Not assigned
S2N; Not assigned	S3N; Yorkton	S4N; Regina; Northeast and East Central	S6N; Not assigned	S7N; Saskatoon; Northeast Central (U of S)	S9N; Not assigned
S2P; Not assigned	S3P; Not assigned	S4P; Regina; Central	S6P; Not assigned	S7P; Saskatoon; North	S9P; Not assigned
S2R; Not assigned	S3R; Not assigned	S4R; Regina; North Central	S6R; Not assigned	S7R; Saskatoon; Northwest	S9R; Not assigned
S2S; Not assigned	S3S; Not assigned	S4S; Regina; South Saskatchewan Provincial Government	S6S; Not assigned	S7S; Saskatoon; Northeast	S9S; Not assigned
S2T; Not assigned	S3T; Not assigned	S4T; Regina; West	S6T; Not assigned	S7T; Saskatoon; South	S9T; Not assigned
S2V; Buena Vista	S3V; Not assigned	S4V; Regina; Southeast	S6V; Prince Albert; Central	S7V; Saskatoon; Southeast	S9V; Lloydminster
S2W; Not assigned	S3W; Not assigned	S4W; Regina; Southwest (YQR)	S6W; Prince Albert; Southwest	S7W; Saskatoon; Various city centre locations	S9W; Not assigned
S2X; Not assigned	S3X; Not assigned	S4X; Regina; Northwest	S6X; Prince Albert; East	S7X; Not assigned	S9X; Meadow Lake
S2Y; Not assigned	S3Y; Not assigned	S4Y; Regina; Outer Northwest	S6Y; Not assigned	S7Y; Not assigned	S9Y; Not assigned
S2Z; Not assigned	S3Z; Not assigned	S4Z; Regina; Northeast	S6Z; Not assigned	S7Z; Not assigned	S9Z; Not assigned

=== Rural ===
S0A
Yorkton Region

0A0: Abernethy
0B0: Arran
0C0: Atwater
0E0: Bangor
0G0: Bankend
0G6: Rama
0H0: Bredenbury
0J0: Buchanan
0K0: Calder
0L0: Canora
0M0: Churchbridge
0N0: Clair
0P0: Danbury
0R0: Dubuc
0S0: Duff
0T0: Ebenezer
0V0: Elfros
0W0: Endeavour
0X0: Esterhazy
0Y0: Fenwood
1A0: Foam Lake
1B0: Gerald
1C0: Goodeve
1E0: Grayson
1G0: Hazel Dell
1J0: Hubbard
1K0: Hyas
1L0: Insinger
1M0: Invermay
1N0: Ituna
1R0: Jedburgh
1S0: Kamsack
1V0: Kelliher
1W0: Kelvington
1X0: Killaly
1Y0: Kuroki
1Z0: Kylemore
2A0: Langenburg
2B0: Lemberg
2C0: Leross
2E0: Leslie
2G0: Lestock
2H0: Lintlaw
2K0: Macnutt
2M0: Margo
2P0: Melville
2R0: Mikado
2S0: Mozart
2T0: Neudorf
2V0: Norquay
2W0: Nut Mountain
2X0: Okla
2Z0: Pelly
3A0: Yellow Quill
3B0: Preeceville
3C0: Punnichy
3E0: Quill Lake
3G0: Quinton
3H0: Rama
3J0: Raymore
3K0: Rhein
3L0: Rocanville
3N0: Rokeby
3P0: Runnymede
3R0: Saltcoats
3S0: Semans
3T0: Sheho
3V0: Springside
3W0: Spy Hill
3X0: Stenen
3Y0: Stockholm
3Z0: Stornoway
4A0: Sturgis
4B0: Tantallon
4C0: Theodore
4E0: Togo
4G0: Tuffnell
4H0: Veregin
4J0: Wadena
4K0: Waldron
4L0: Welwyn
4M0: West Bend
4P0: Willowbrook
4R0: Wishart
4S0: Wroxton
4T0: Wynyard
4V0: Yarbo

S0B
Not in use
S0C
Southeastern Saskatchewan

0A0: Alameda
0B0: Alida
0E0: Antler
0G0: Arcola
0H0: Beaubier
0J0: Bellegarde
0K0: Bengough
0L0: Benson
0M0: Bienfait
0N0: Bromhead
0P0: Carievale
0R0: Carlyle
0S0: Carnduff
0T0: Ceylon
0V0: Colgate
0W0: Fertile
0X0: Forget
0Y0: Frobisher
0Z0: Gainsborough
1A0: Gladmar
1B0: Glasnevin
1C0: Glen Ewen
1E0: Goodwater
1G0: Griffin
1H0: Halbrite
1K0: Khedive
1L0: Kisbey
1M0: Lake Alma
1N0: Lampman
1P0: Macoun
1R0: Manor
1S0: Midale
1T0: Minton
1W0: North Portal
1X0: North Weyburn
1Y0: Ogema
1Z0: Oungre
2B0: Oxbow
2C0: Pangman
2E0: Parkman
2G0: Radville
2H0: Redvers
2J0: Steelman
2K0: Storthoaks
2L0: Torquay
2M0: Tribune
2N0: Trossachs
2P0: Wauchope
2S0: Kenosee Lake

S0E
Eastern Saskatchewan

0A0: Arborfield
0B0: Archerwill
0C0: Aylsham
0E0: Bjorkdale
0G0: Brockington
0H0: Brooksby
0K0: Carragana
0L0: Carrot River
0N0: Chelan
0P0: Codette
0R0: Crooked River
0S0: Cumberland House
0T0: Fairy Glen
0V0: Fosston
0W0: Gronlid
0X0: Hendon
0Y0: Hudson Bay
1A0: Melfort
1B0: Mistatim
1E0: Nipawin
1G0: Pakwaw Lake
1H0: Porcupine Plain
1J0: Prairie River
1K0: Red Earth
1L0: Ridgedale
1M0: Rose Valley
1P0: Star City
1S0: Sylvania
1T0: Tisdale
1V0: Weekes
1W0: Zenon Park

S0G
South Central Saskatchewan

0A0: Avonhurst
0B0: Aylesbury
0C0: Balcarres
0E0: Balgonie
0G0: Belle Plaine
0H0: Bethune
0J0: Bladworth
0K0: Broadview
0L0: Bulyea
0N0: Candiac
0R0: Chamberlain
0S0: Colfax
0T0: Corning
0V0: Craik
0W0: Craven
0X0: Creelman
0Y0: Cupar
0Z0: Cymric
1A0: Davidson
1B0: Davin
1C0: Dilke
1G0: Duval
1H0: Dysart
1J0: Earl Grey
1K0: Edenwold
1L0: Edgeley
1M0: Fairlight
1N0: Fillmore
1P0: Findlater
1R0: Fleming
1S0: Fort Qu’Appelle
1V0: Francis
1Y0: Glenavon
1Z0: Govan
2A0: Gray
2B0: Grenfell
2E0: Hanley
2G0: Heward
2H0: Holdfast
2J0: Imperial
2K0: Indian Head
2N0: Kenaston
2P0: Kendal
2R0: Kennedy
2S0: Kipling
2T0: Kronau
2V0: Lajord
2W0: Lang
2X0: Langbank
2Y0: Lebret
2Z0: Lewvan
3A0: Liberty
3B0: Lipton
3C0: Lumsden
3E0: Mclean
3G0: McTaggart
3J0: Markinch
3K0: Maryfield
3L0: Milestone
3M0: Montmartre
3N0: Moosomin
3R0: Nokomis
3S0: Odessa
3T0: Osage
3V0: Peebles
3W0: Pense
3X0: Penzance
3Z0: Pilot Butte
4A0: Qu’Appelle
4C0: Regina Beach
4E0: Riceton
4G0: Richardson
4H0: Rouleau
4K0: Sedley
4L0: Silton
4M0: Simpson
4N0: Sintaluta
4P0: Southey
4R0: Stalwart
4S0: Stony Beach
4T0: Stoughton
4V0: Strasbourg
4W0: Summerberry
4X0: Tyvan
4Y0: Vibank
4Z0: Wapella
5A0: Wawota
5C0: Whitewood
5E0: Wilcox
5G0: Windthorst
5H0: Wolseley
5J0: Yellow Grass
5K0: Zehner
5L0: Cowessess
5M0: Pasqua

S0H
Southern Saskatchewan

0A0: Ardill
0B0: Assiniboia
0C0: Avonlea
0E0: Bateman
0G0: Big Beaver
0K0: Briercrest
0L0: Broderick
0M0: Brownlee
0N0: Bushell Park
0P0: Cardross
0R0: Caron
0S0: Caronport
0T0: Central Butte
0V0: Chaplin
0W0: Claybank
0X0: Coderre
0Y0: Congress
0Z0: Coronach
1A0: Courval
1B0: Crane Valley
1G0: Drinkwater
1H0: Dummer
1J0: Elbow
1K0: Ernfold
1L0: Eyebrow
1M0: Ferland
1N0: Fife Lake
1P0: Fir Mountain
1R0: Flintoft
1T0: Glenside
1V0: Glentworth
1W0: Gouldtown
1X0: Gravelbourg
1Y0: Hawarden
1Z0: Hearne
2A0: Herbert
2B0: Hodgeville
2C0: Kayville
2E0: Keeler
2J0: Kincaid
2K0: Lafleche
2P0: Limerick
2R0: Lisieux
2S0: Loreburn
2T0: McCord
2V0: Main Centre
2W0: Mankota
2X0: Marquis
2Y0: Mazenod
3A0: Meyronne
3C0: Morse
3E0: Mortlach
3G0: Mossbank
3H0: Ormiston
3J0: Palmer
3K0: Parkbeg
3L0: Parry
3M0: Prairie View
3P0: Riverhurst
3R0: Rockglen
3S0: Rush Lake
3T0: St. Victor
3V0: Scout Lake
3W0: Shamrock
3X0: Spring Valley
3Z0: Strongfield
4A0: Truax
4B0: Tugaske
4C0: Tuxford
4G0: Verwood
4H0: Viceroy
4J0: Waldeck
4K0: Willow Bunch
4L0: Wood Mountain
4M0: Woodrow

S0J
Northern Saskatchewan

0A0: Albertville
0C0: Beatty
0E0: Big River
0G0: Birch Hills
0H0: Black Lake
0J0: Blaine Lake
0K0: Canwood
0L0: Chitek Lake
0M0: Choiceland
0N0: Christopher Lake
0S0: Debden
0W0: Fond du Lac
0Y0: Foxford
0Z0: Garrick
1A0: Hafford
1B0: Hagen
1C0: Henribourg
1E0: Hoey
1G0: Holbein
1H0: Kinistino
1K0: Krydor
1L0: La Ronge
1M0: Leask
1N0: Leoville
1P0: Love
1R0: Marcelin
1S0: Mayview
1T0: Meath Park
1V0: Mildred
1W0: Weyakwin
1X0: Mont Nebo
1Y0: Montreal Lake
1Z0: Paddockwood
2A0: Parkside
2B0: Pinehouse Lake
2C0: St. Louis
2E0: Shellbrook
2G0: Shell Lake
2H0: Shipman
2J0: Smeaton
2K0: Snowden
2L0: Southend
2M0: Spiritwood
2N0: Spruce Home
2P0: Stanley Mission
2R0: Stony Rapids
2S0: Stump Lake
2T0: Timber Bay
2W0: Uranium City
2X0: Victoire
2Y0: Waskesiu Lake
2Z0: Weirdale
3A0: Weldon
3B0: White Fox
3C0: Wollaston Lake
3E0: Candle Lake
3G0: Air Ronge
3H0: Muskoday

S0K
Central Saskatchewan

0A0: Aberdeen
0C0: Allan
0E0: Alvena
0G0: Annaheim
0H0: Arelee
0J0: Asquith
0M0: Biggar
0N0: Borden
0P0: Bradwell
0S0: Bruno
0T0: Burr
0V0: Cando
0X0: Carmel
0Y0: Clavet
0Z0: Colonsay
1A0: Crystal Springs
1B0: Cudworth
1C0: Dafoe
1E0: Dalmeny
1G0: Domremy
1H0: Drake
1J0: Duck Lake
1K0: Dundurn
1L0: Duperow
1M0: Elstow
1N0: Englefeld
1T0: Fulda
1V0: Grandora
1W0: Guernsey
1X0: Hague
1Y0: Handel
1Z0: Hepburn
2A0: Humboldt
2B0: Jansen
2C0: Kelfield
2E0: Kinley
2G0: Lac Vert
2H0: Laird
2J0: Lake Lenore
2K0: Landis
2L0: Langham
2M0: Lanigan
2P0: Leroy
2R0: Lockwood
2S0: Macdowall
2T0: Martensville
2V0: Meacham
2W0: Meskanaw
2X0: Middle Lake
2Y0: Muenster
2Z0: Naicam
3A0: Osler
3B0: Pathlow
3C0: Perdue
3E0: Phippen
3G0: Pilger
3H0: Pleasantdale
3J0: Plunkett
3K0: Prud’homme
3L0: Radisson
3N0: Reward
3R0: Rosthern
3S0: Ruthilda
3T0: St. Benedict
3V0: St. Brieux
3W0: St. Denis
3X0: St. Gregor
3Y0: St. Isidore de Bellevue
4A0: Scott
4B0: Sonningdale
4C0: Spalding
4E0: Springwater
4H0: Tramping Lake
4K0: Tway
4L0: Unity
4M0: Viscount
4N0: Vonda
4P0: Wakaw
4R0: Waldheim
4S0: Warman
4T0: Watrous
4V0: Watson
4W0: Wilkie
4X0: Yellow Creek
4Y0: Young
5B0: Martensville
5S0: Warman

S0L
Western Saskatchewan

0A0: Alsask
0B0: Ardath
0C0: Beechy
0G0: Birsay
0H0: Brock
0J0: Cactus Lake
0K0: Coleville
0L0: Conquest
0N0: D'Arcy Station
0P0: Delisle
0R0: Demaine
0S0: Denzil
0T0: Dinsmore
0V0: Dodsland
0Y0: Eatonia
0Z0: Elrose
1A0: Eston
1B0: Evesham
1C0: Fiske
1E0: Flaxcombe
1H0: Glidden
1K0: Harris
1L0: Herschel
1M0: Hoosier
1R0: Kerrobert
1S0: Kindersley
1T0: Kyle
1V0: Lacadena
1W0: Laporte
1Y0: Loverna
1Z0: Lucky Lake
2A0: Luseland
2C0: Macklin
2E0: Macrorie
2G0: Madison
2H0: Major
2J0: Mantario
2K0: Marengo
2L0: Milden
2M0: Netherhill
2N0: Outlook
2P0: Plato
2R0: Plenty
2S0: Primate
2T0: Richlea
2V0: Rosetown
2Y0: Senlac
2Z0: Smiley
3A0: Sovereign
3B0: Stranraer
3G0: Tessier
3H0: Tyner
3J0: Vanscoy
3L0: White Bear
3M0: Wiseton
3N0: Zealandia
3R0: Kindersley

S0M
Northwestern Saskatchewan

0A0: Alticane
0B0: Baldwinton
0C0: Barthel
0E0: Battleford
0G0: Beauval
0H0: Bright Sand
0J0: Buffalo Narrows
0K0: Canoe Narrows
0L0: Cochin
0M0: Cole Bay
0N0: Cut Knife
0P0: Delmas
0R0: Denholm
0S0: Dillon
0T0: Dorintosh
0V0: Edam
0W0: Frenchman Butte
0X0: Gallivan
0Y0: Glaslyn
0Z0: Glenbush
1A0: Goodsoil
1B0: Green Lake
1C0: Ile-à-la-Crosse
1G0: La Loche
1H0: Lashburn
1J0: Livelong
1K0: Lone Rock
1L0: Loon Lake
1M0: Maidstone
1N0: Makwa
1P0: Marsden
1R0: Marshall
1S0: Mayfair
1T0: Maymont
1W0: Medstead
1X0: Meota
1Y0: Mervin
2A0: Mullingar
2C0: Neilburg
2E0: Onion Lake
2G0: Paradise Hill
2H0: Patuanak
2J0: Paynton
2K0: Pierceland
2L0: Rabbit Lake
2M0: Rapid View
2P0: Richard
2R0: Rockhaven
2S0: Ruddell
2T0: St. Walburg
2V0: Speers
2W0: Spruce Lake
2Y0: Turtleford
2Z0: Vawn
3A0: Waseca
3B0: Waterhen Lake
3C0: Whelan
3E0: Turnor Lake
3G0: Island Lake
3H0: Clearwater River

S0N
Southwestern Saskatchewan

0A0: Abbey
0B0: Admiral
0C0: Aneroid
0E0: Blumenhof
0G0: Bracken
0H0: Burstall
0J0: Cabri
0K0: Cadillac
0M0: Claydon
0N0: Climax
0P0: Consul
0S0: Dollard
0T0: Eastend
0V0: Fox Valley
0W0: Frontier
0X0: Glenbain
0Y0: Golden Prairie
1A0: Gull Lake
1C0: Hazenmore
1E0: Hazlet
1G0: Lancer
1H0: Leader
1L0: Liebenthal
1M0: McMahon
1N0: Maple Creek
1P0: Mendham
1S0: Neidpath
1T0: Neville
1V0: Orkney
1W0: Pambrun
1X0: Pennant Station
1Y0: Piapot
1Z0: Ponteix
2A0: Portreeve
2B0: Prelate
2E0: Richmound
2G0: Robsart
2H0: Sceptre
2L0: Shackleton
2M0: Shaunavon
2N0: Simmie
2P0: Stewart Valley
2R0: Success
2S0: Tompkins
2T0: Val Marie
2V0: Vanguard
2W0: Vidora
2X0: Webb
2Y0: Wymark

S0P
Northeastern Saskatchewan

0A0: Creighton
0B0: Denare Beach
0C0: Deschambault Lake
0E0: Pelican Narrows
0G0: Sandy Bay
0H0: Sturgeon Landing
0J0: Kinoosao

S0R
Not in use
S0S
Not in use
S0T
Not in use
S0V
Not in use
S0W
Not in use
S0X
Not in use
S0Y
Not in use
S0Z
Not in use

== Most populated FSAs ==
1. S0K, 90,185
2. S0G, 65,876
3. S0A, 52,751
4. S0J, 50,642
5. S0M, 48,250

== Least populated FSAs ==
1. S4K, 81
2. S7A, 176
3. S7P, 178
4. S6W, 288
5. S7B, 497
