= Saskatchewan Highway 2 =

Provincial highway in Saskatchewan, Canada

Highway 2
- Veterans Memorial Highway (segment); CanAm Highway (segment)
- Highway 2 highlighted in red
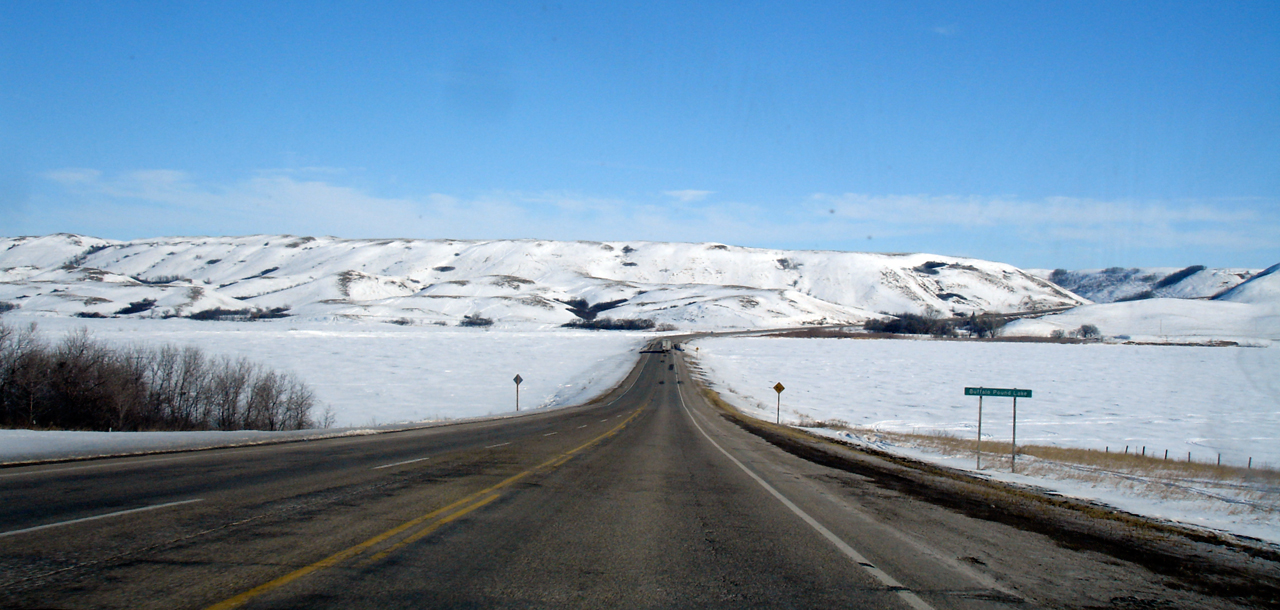
- Highway 2 crossing Buffalo Pound Lake in the Qu'Appelle Valley

Route information
- Maintained by Ministry of Highways and Infrastructure
- Length: 797.7 km (495.7 mi)

Major junctions
- South end: MT 24 at the U.S. border in West Poplar
- Highway 13 in Assiniboia; Highway 1 (TCH) in Moose Jaw; Highway 11 at Chamberlain; Highway 16 (TCH/YH) near Colonsay; Highway 5 near Meacham; Highway 41 at Wakaw; Highway 11 near Prince Albert; Highway 3 / CanAm Highway in Prince Albert; Highway 55 in Prince Albert
- North end: Highway 102 / CanAm Highway in La Ronge

Location
- Country: Canada
- Province: Saskatchewan
- Rural municipalities: Old Post No. 43, Poplar Valley No. 12, Willow Bunch No. 42, Stonehenge No. 73, Lake of the Rivers No. 72, Sutton No. 103, Lake Johnston No. 102, Terrell No. 101, Baildon No. 131, Moose Jaw No. 161, Marquis No. 191, Dufferin No. 190, Sarnia No. 221, Big Arm No. 251, Wood Creek No. 281, Morris No. 312, Colonsay No. 342, Bayne No. 371, Hoodoo No. 401, Fish Creek No. 402, St. Louis No. 431, Prince Albert No. 461, Buckland No. 491, Paddockwood No. 520, Lakeland No. 521
- Major cities: Moose Jaw, Prince Albert
- Towns: Assiniboia, Watrous, Wakaw, La Ronge

Highway system
- Provincial highways in Saskatchewan
← Highway 1	→ Highway 3

Highway 2 is a major north–south, paved provincial highway in Saskatchewan, Canada. It runs from the Canada–United States border crossing at the U.S. state of Montana north to the town of La Ronge in Northern Saskatchewan. At nearly 800 kilometres (500 mi) in length, it is the longest highway in the province. Most of the highway is two-laned, with the exception of three relatively short sections of divided highway at Moose Jaw, Chamberlain, and Prince Albert. Highway 2 from Moose Jaw to La Ronge is part of the National highway system and most of the highway is primary weight. The southern part of Highway 2 traverses rolling hills and grasslands, while the middle section runs through open, flat prairie farmland. The northern leg—north of Prince Albert—is in boreal forest.

Cities and towns along Highway 2 include Moose Jaw, Prince Albert, Rockglen, Assiniboia, Watrous, Wakaw, and La Ronge. Highway 2 provides access to both national parks in Saskatchewan (the East Block of Grasslands National Park and Prince Albert National Park) and several provincial and regional parks.

The highway started as a graded road in the 1920s, which followed the grid lines of the early survey system and was maintained by early homesteaders of each rural municipality. Paving projects of the 1950s created all weather roads. Technological advances have paved the way for cost-effective methods of improvements to highway surfaces to meet the wear and tear of increased tourist and commercial highway traffic.

In the 1920s, Highway 2 was included as part of the CanAm Highway that runs from Mexico, through the U.S., and into Canada. The stretch of Highway 2 from Moose Jaw to Prince Albert was designated in 2005 as "Veterans Memorial Highway". The designation coincided with Veterans Week 2005.

== History ==
The Saskatchewan Highway Act was established in 1922, in compliance with the 1919 Canadian Highway Act. At the initial stages of the Saskatchewan Highway Act, 10 miles (16 km) of highway were gravel and the rest were earth roads. The road allowances were laid out as a part of the Dominion Land survey system for homesteading. In the 1920s, a north–south highway connecting Mexico to Canada through the United States called the CanAm Highway was conceptualised. A portion of Highway 2 was designated as part of that highway. In 2005, the segment of Highway 2 from Moose Jaw to Prince Albert was designated as Veterans Memorial Highway.

Highway 2 was constructed and upgraded in multiple phases. In 1907, the highway was constructed south of Chamberlain and to Buffalo Pound Lake. At this time two horse scrapers and walking ploughs were the implements of road construction technology. This highway received an improvement in 1926 which then used an elevating grader, 16 horses, and a dump wagon. The section of highway south of Chamberlain to Moose Jaw was completed in 1953. Paving projects followed within a short time period. By 1955, other parts of Highway 2 had been paved, including between Vantage and Tuxford, north of Watrous along the Little Manitou Lake shoreline, north of the junction with Highway 27 to Montreal Lake, and either side of Prince Albert.

Originally, Highway 2 wound its way through the town of Wakaw. In 1952, it was re-routed along the western limit of town. Prior to the 1960s, Highway 2 traversed the eastern shore of Montreal Lake. It was rerouted at that time to the western shore.

== Description ==
Highway 2, the longest highway in Saskatchewan, is a north–south highway that has its southern terminus at the West Poplar River Border Crossing and its northern terminus in the town of La Ronge. The highway travels through varied landscapes from rolling hills, grasslands, open prairie, aspen parkland, to dense boreal forest in the north. It traverses a continental divide in the Wood Mountain Hills, crosses three major rivers—the Qu'Appelle, North Saskatchewan, and the South Saskatchewan, provides access to multiple parks and lakes, and services two cities—Moose Jaw and Prince Albert. It also, along with Saskatchewan Highways 35, 39, 6, 3, 2, and 102, is part of the trans-international CanAm Highway.

=== U.S. border to Moose Jaw ===
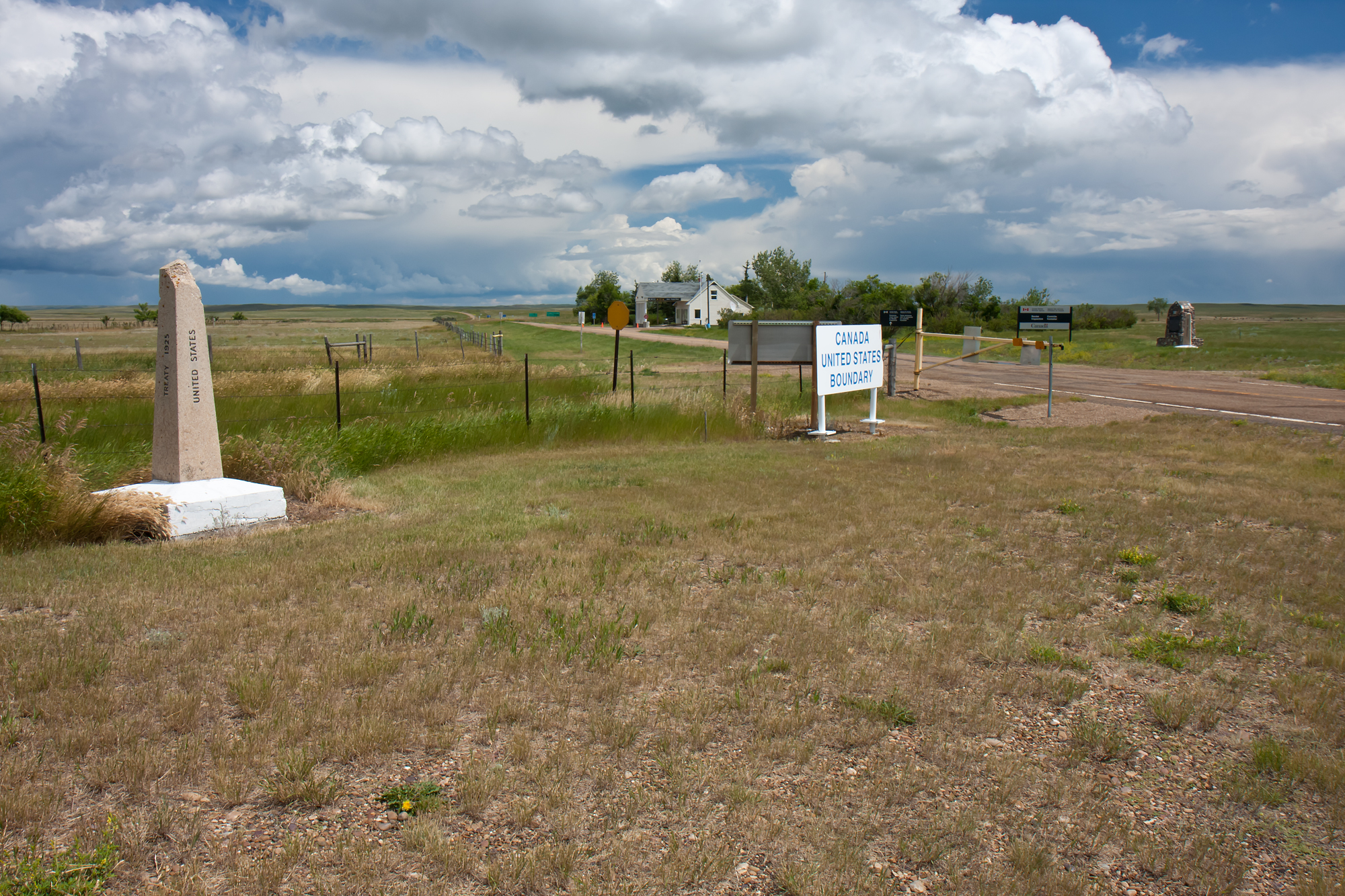
West Poplar River Border Crossing at the southern terminus of Highway 2

Highway 2 begins at the Saskatchewan–Montana border crossing of West Poplar River. The highway heads south into the U.S. as Montana Highway 24. In Saskatchewan, it first travels north-east from the border where it crosses the West Poplar River and then turns north for about 12 kilometres (7.5 mi) to Highway 18. Near this intersection is the access to the East Block of Grasslands National Park. Highways 18 and 2 then begin a 37-kilometre (23 mi) long eastbound concurrency that runs along the southern slopes of the Wood Mountain Hills and provides access the communities of Killdeer, Canopus, and Quantock. East of Canopus, the highway crosses the Poplar River. The concurrency ends at Rockglen with 18 continuing east and 2 resuming its northerly routing. This area remained above the Quaternary age ice sheets, being pushed and folded by the glacier movement resulting in glaciotectonic hills. Leaving Rockglen, Highway 2 travels north for about 82 kilometres (51 mi) towards Highway 43 and Old Wives Lake.

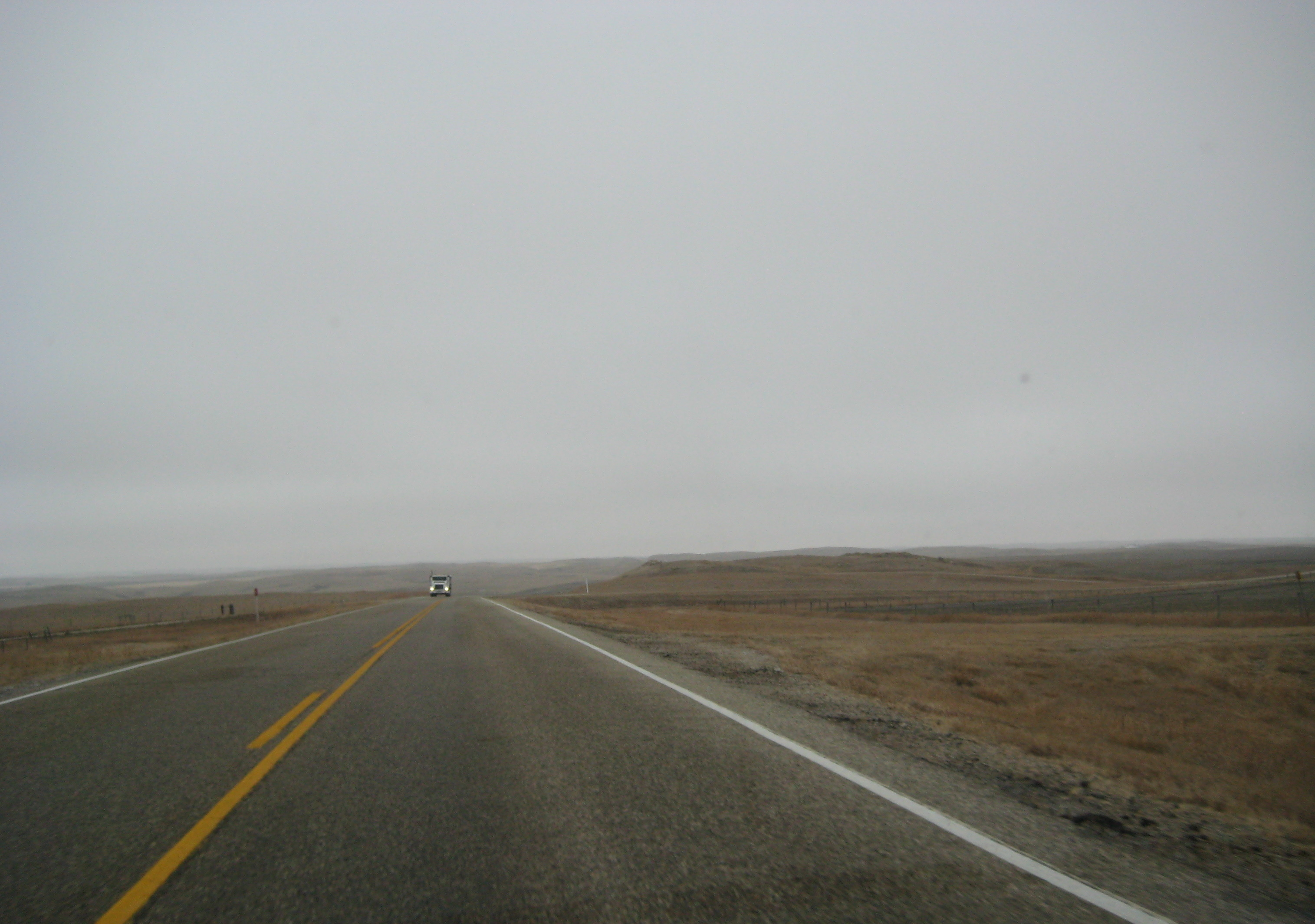
Highway 2 en route to Assiniboia

North of Rockglen, Highway 2 passes by Fife Lake, provides access to Lisieux, and runs along the eastern slopes of the Wood Mountain Hills. North of Lisieux, the highway intersects Highway 705 and passes through Scout Lake. To the west of Highway 2 is St. Victor Petroglyphs Provincial Park, and to the east is Twelve Mile Lake. After passing the lake, the highway continues north towards Maxstone and Highway 719. About 13 kilometres (8.1 mi) north of the intersection with 719, Highway 2 enters the town of Assiniboia and intersects Highway 13. As Highway 2 enters Assiniboia, it turns to the north-west and becomes Empire Road. At the intersection with Dominion Road, it turns back north and continues to Highway 13 as Centre Street. From the intersection with Highway 13, the two highways run west concurrently as 1st Avenue West. The highway then turns north. Shortly thereafter, Highway 13 turns west leaving the concurrency while 2 continues north leaving Assiniboia. Highway 2 travels north for a further 26 kilometres (16 mi), passing by Congress and Vantage, en route to the eastern terminus of Highway 43.

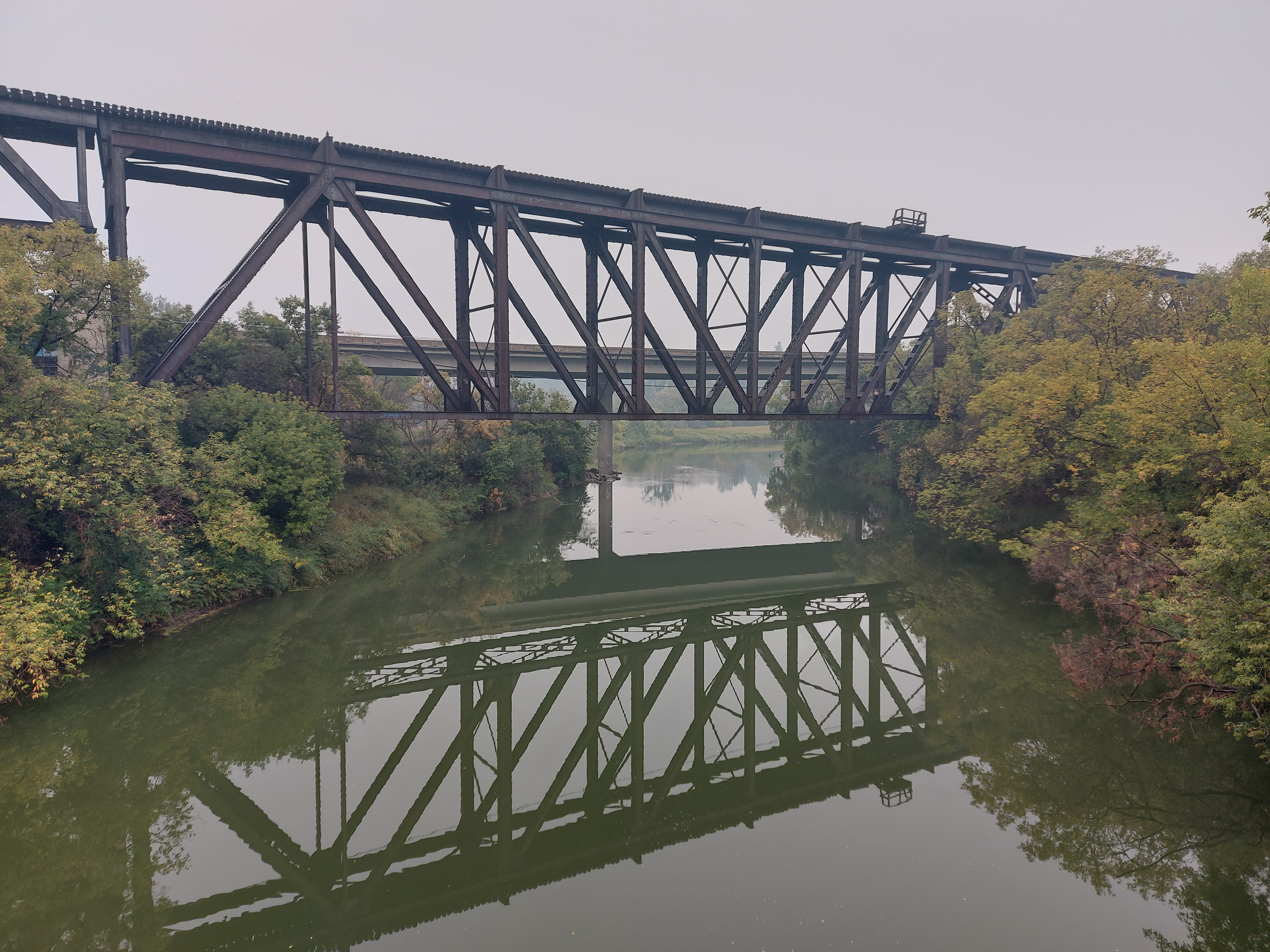
A railway bridge (foreground) and Highway 2 (background) cross the Moose Jaw River

At Highway 43, Highway 2 turns to the north-east. It travels in that direction for about 44 kilometres (27 mi) until it meets the northern terminus of Highway 36. From Highway 43 to 36, Highway 2 passes to the south of Old Wives Lake and to the west of Lake of the Rivers. It also intersects Highway 718 (access to Mossbank) and Highway 715. Between 718 and 715, Highway 2 passes by Mossbank Golf Club and Ardill. From the intersection with Highway 36, Highway 2 heads north towards Moose Jaw. En route to Moose Jaw, the highway intersects Highway 716, passes by the Sukanen Ship Pioneer Village & Museum, provides access to 15 Wing Moose Jaw / CFB Moose Jaw and Bushell Park (via 9th Avenue SW), and crosses the Moose Jaw River.

The section of Highway 2 from 9th Avenue north through Moose Jaw is four lanes. The first part of that—from 9th Avenue to Manitoba Street—is known as the Snowbirds Expressway. As Highway 2 enters Moose Jaw's city limits, it crosses the Moose Jaw River for a second time. Once across the river, it splits with northbound traffic following 1st Avenue and southbound traffic following Main Street South. The two sections reconverge in Wakamow Valley on the north side of Thunder Creek. The highway then passes under a bridge carrying the CPKC railway. It then intersects Manitoba Street where it turns west. It runs as Manitoba Street for two blocks before turning north following Main Street North through downtown. Highway 2 continues through Moose Jaw where it has a partial cloverleaf intersection with Highway 1, the Trans-Canada Highway.

Attractions accessed from Highway 2 through Moose Jaw include the Tunnels of Moose Jaw, Temple Gardens Hotel & Spa, Moose Jaw Museum & Art Gallery, Lieutenant Colonel D.V. Currie VC Armoury (named after Victoria Cross recipient David Vivian Currie), Town 'n' Country Mall, Hillcrest Golf Course, Lynbrook Golf Club, and the Western Development Museum.

=== Veterans Memorial Highway ===
The Veterans Memorial Highway is a section of Highway 2 that runs from Moose Jaw north to Prince Albert. In 2005, as a tribute to Saskatchewan veterans, former premier Lorne Calvert, former Minister of Highways and Transportation Eldon Lautermilch, and Past Provincial President of the Royal Canadian Legion, Saskatchewan Command, John Henderson together unveiled the new highway sign on 10 November 2005. The ceremony was held during veteran's week from 5–11 November. The Royal Canadian Legion, Saskatchewan Command, and Saskatchewan Remembers Committee came together to select this particular highway because of the history of a military presence along the route.

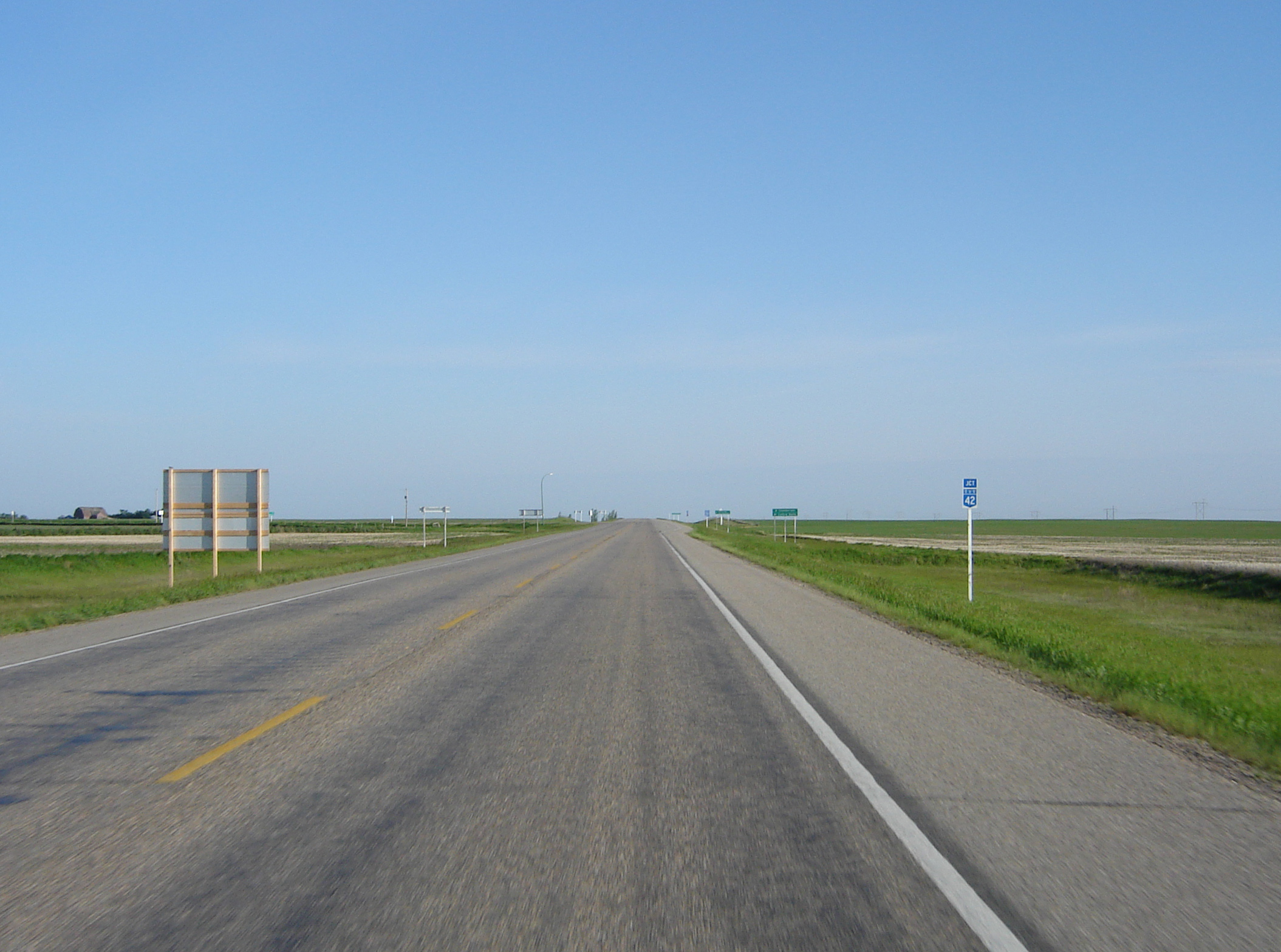
Highway 2's junction with 47

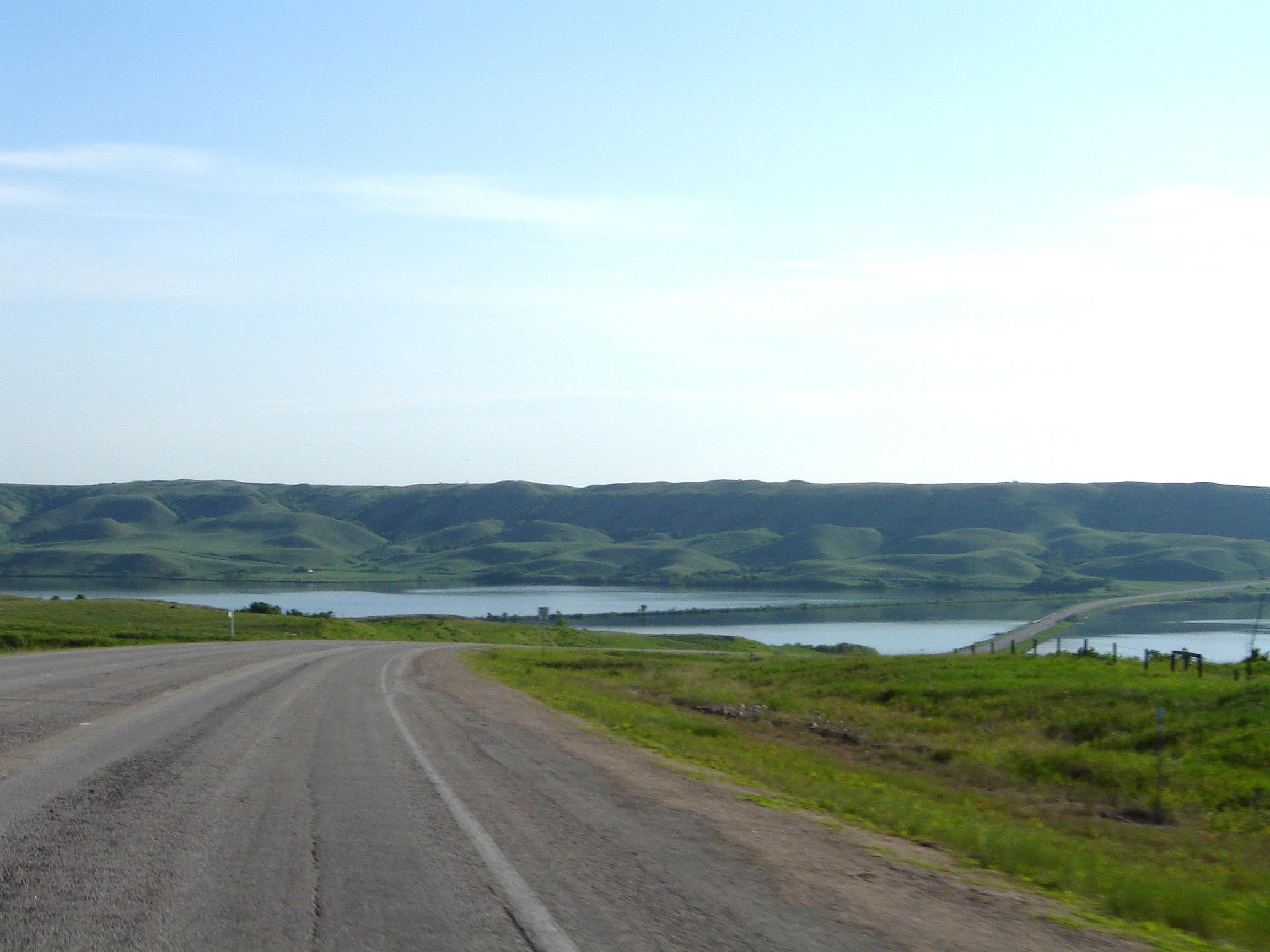
Highway 2 descending into the Qu'Appelle Valley where it crosses Buffalo Pound Lake

Highway 2 continues north from its intersection with Highway 1 on the north side of Moose Jaw. About 1 kilometre (0.62 mi) north of that intersection, the four-laned section of the highway ends. Highway 2 travels north for about 12 kilometres (7.5 mi) until it meets Highway 202. Highway 202 provides access to Buffalo Pound Provincial Park. From Highway 202, 2 turns to the north-west where it intersects the eastern terminus of Highway 42 at Tuxford. It then turns back north where it winds its way down into the Qu'Appelle Valley and, via a causeway and a short bridge, it crosses Buffalo Pound Lake. Coming out of the valley, Highway 2 intersects Highway 739 before resuming its northerly routing to Chamberlain and Highway 11. Highway 2 then begins a south-easterly 11.6-kilometre (7.2 mi) long wrong-way concurrency with 11. This concurrency is a four-lane divided highway. About 2 kilometres (1.2 mi) before Findlater, Highway 2 turns north while 11 continues south-east towards Regina.

Leaving Highway 11, Highway 2 travels north for nearly one hundred kilometres to the town of Watrous and Highway 365. Much of this distance parallels the western shore of Last Mountain Lake. Highways intersected along this stretch include 733, 732, 749, 747, and 15. Communities include Holdfast, Penzance, Liberty, Stalwart, Imperial, Simpson, and Amazon. Stalwart National Wildlife Area is between Highway 2 and Last Mountain Lake near Stalwart.

At Watrous, Highway 2 turns to the north-west where it parallels Little Manitou Lake until Young. Between Watrous and Young is the ghost town of Xena. As Highway 2 approaches Young, it curves more to the north-northwest and intersects Highway 670 (Grand Avenue). The highway then travels along the western edge of town before turning back north and intersecting Highway 763. It continues north for 21 kilometres (13 mi) to Highway 16, the Yellowhead Highway. Communities along this segment include Ancrum, Neely, and Arpiers. At Neely is at the entrance to the Colonsay Potash Mine.

Highway 2 crosses Highway 16 and continues north passing by the communities of Rutan and Meacham en route to the east–west Highway 5. Highways 5 and 2 then begin a 5.5-kilometre (3.4 mi) long northbound concurrency. Highway 5 leaves the concurrency and resumes its eastward travel. Highway 2 continues in a northward direction past Sagehill, Highway 767, Cudworth at Highway 777, and Leofnard. It intersects Highway 41 just south of Wakaw. Highway 2 crosses 41, meets Highway 312 about 600 metres (2,000 ft) later, and runs along the west side of Wakaw. Access to Nelson Beach and Wakaw Lake is from Wakaw. Continuing north from Wakaw, Highway 2 meets Highways 225 and 320 (with access to Domremy). Just over 9 kilometres (6 mi) north of Highway 320, Highway 2 intersects Canopy Road, which provides access to Hoey and Old Highway 2. Old Highway 2—the original routing of Highway 2—heads north from Hoey to St. Louis. It was at St. Louis that the highway originally crossed the South Saskatchewan River via the St. Louis Bridge. Before the bridge, since 1876, it crossed by ferry. Then, in 1928, vehicle lanes were added to a railway bridge that had been built across the river in 1915. In 2014, a "new" St. Louis Bridge was built about 2.5 kilometres (1.6 mi) downstream bypassing St. Louis. Once across the river, the "new" Highway 2 rejoins the Old Highway 2 about 1 kilometre (0.62 mi) north of the new St. Louis Bridge at Gerrond Road. Highway 2 continues its northerly routing for 22 kilometres (14 mi) passing the community of Red Deer Hill and meeting the northern terminus of Highway 11 a few kilometres south of the city of Prince Albert. At this point, Highway 2 becomes four lanes. In the city, the Veterans Memorial Highway section ends and the highway becomes part of the CanAm Highway.

=== CanAm Highway ===
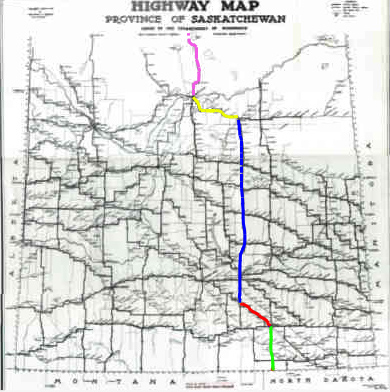
CanAm Highway Legend through Saskatchewan: Sk 35 — green Sk 39 — red Sk 6 — blue Sk 3 — yellow Sk 2 — pink

The CanAm Highway is an international highway that connects Mexico to Canada through the United States. The final 239 kilometres (149 mi) of Saskatchewan's Highway 2 are part of the CanAm Highway. At Highway 2's northern terminus, the CanAm continues north as Highway 102.

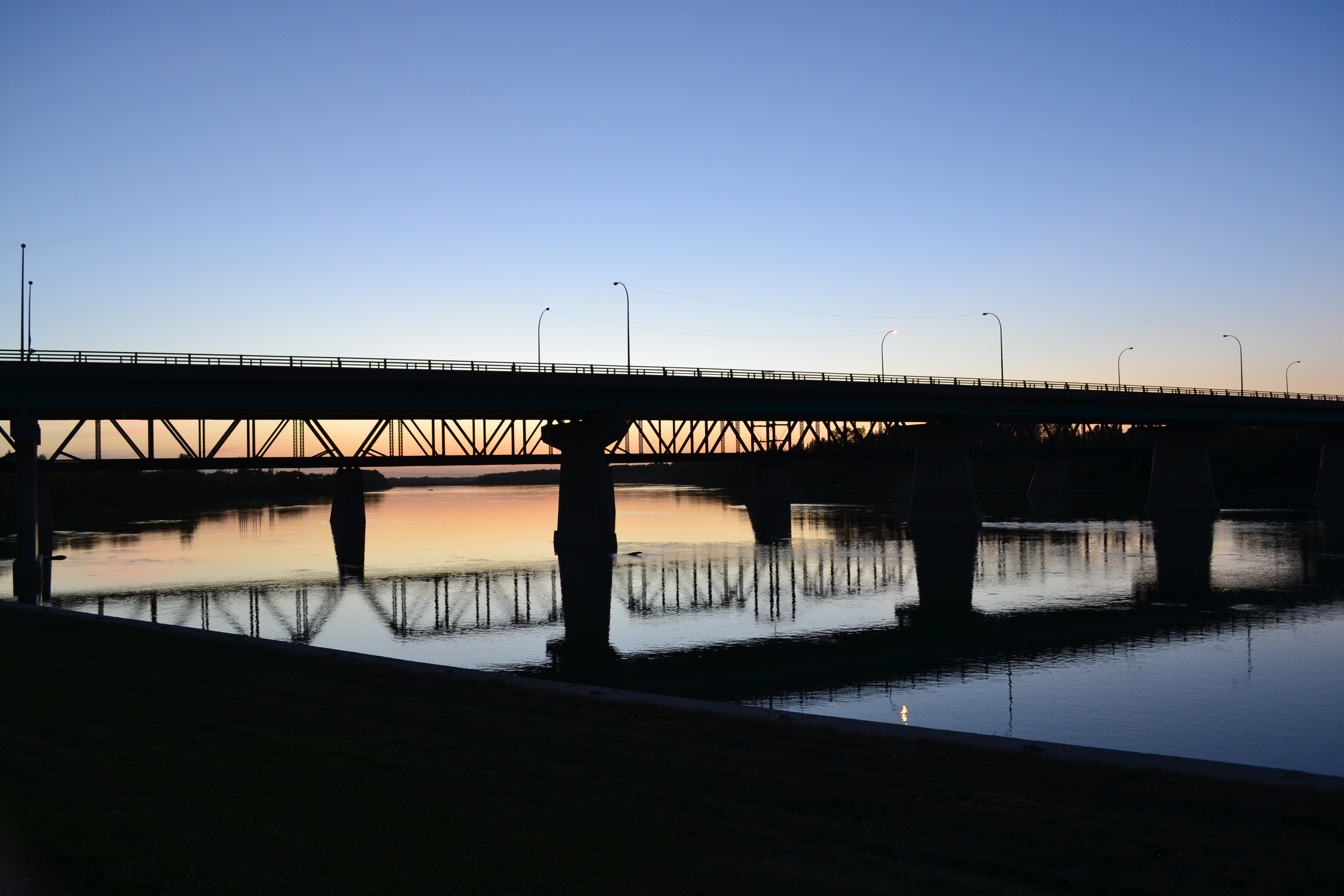
Highway 2 crossing the North Saskatchewan River over the Diefenbaker Bridge.

Highway 2 enters Prince Albert from the south as 2nd Avenue West. It is a four-lane highway that travels past light industrial, commercial, and residential neighbourhoods as it heads towards downtown Prince Albert. It meets Highway 3 near Gateway Mall and becomes part of the CanAm Highway. Highways 3 and 2 then run concurrently northbound across the North Saskatchewan River via Diefenbaker Bridge. After crossing the river, Highway 3 leaves the concurrency at a partial cloverleaf while 2 continues north. Highway 2 remains four lanes for about 5.5 kilometres (3.4 mi) until the community of Redwing.

As Highway 2 continues north, it leaves the aspen Parkland ecozone, and transitions into the boreal forest. North of Redwing, 2 intersects Highways 780 (with access to White Star) and 355 and runs through the communities of Spruce Home and Northside. North of Northside, Highway 2 intersects Highway 263, which heads west providing access to the community of Christopher Lake. Also down 263 are several recreational lakes, such Christopher and Emma. Great Blue Heron Provincial Park and Prince Albert National Park are also accessed from 263. Highway 2 continues north from this intersection for a further 25 kilometres (16 mi) before intersecting Highway 953. Great Blue Heron Provincial Park is also accessed from 953. Highway 2 continues running north paralleling the eastern boundary of Prince Albert National Park. Highway 264 intersects 2 about 12 kilometres (7.5 mi) north of 953. That highway leads north-west to Waskesiu Lake and the main entrance to Prince Albert National Park. To the east of Highway 2 are Bittern Lake and Montreal Lake, as well as the community of Montreal Lake. Access is from Highway 969. Highway 2 previously followed the current routing of 969 along the eastern shore of Montreal Lake. In the 1960s, it was rerouted to follow the western shore. Continuing north from the intersection with 969, Highway 2 intersects Highway 916 and passes through Weyakwin (with access to Weyakwin Lake). Several kilometres north of Weyakwin, the highway turns north-east. A few kilometres after turning north-east, it intersects Highway 165 at McKay Indian reserve 209. The two highways then begin a 20-kilometre (12 mi) long concurrency, at the end of which 165 turns south-east and 2 turns north towards its northern terminus.

As Highway 2 approaches that terminus, it travels through Lac la Ronge Indian reserve 156 and Air Ronge before crossing the Montreal River. Across the river, it first enters Kitsakie Indian reserve 156B and then La Ronge on the western shore of Lac la Ronge La Ronge is the main access point to Lac La Ronge Provincial Park. Highway 2 ends shortly after entering La Ronge at Brown Street. From there, the highway continues north-east as Highway 102 (and the CanAm) until the community of Southend at Reindeer Lake.

=== Highway improvements and upgrades ===
- In 1999, the granular pavement section of Highway 2 south of Watrous was tested with a cold in-place recycling or "CIR" method to rehabilitate highways. This CIR process is a cost-effective method which recycles the top surface of a road. This pulverized material is mixed with asphalt emulsion and spread and compacted back onto the highway surface. This surface is then recovered with a new seal dependent on traffic volume.
- In 2001, 6.6 km (4.1 mi) were resurfaced near the Cudworth access road, as well 3.7 km (2.3 mi) north of the Highway 27 junction.
- In 2002, a section of Highway 2 was repaved from the junction with Highway 16 south for 10.4 km (6.5 mi) towards Young.
- In 2014, the "new" St. Louis Bridge over the South Saskatchewan River was completed.
- In 2025, bridge repair and other upgrades to Highway 2 at Moose Jaw were started. "An estimated $33.7 million overpass project that began in 2025 to raise the height of Highway 2 over Trans-Canada Highway 1 at Moose Jaw saw the new northbound bridge completed and open to traffic in October. Contractors will return in April 2026 to begin work on a new southbound bridge." The project is expected to be finished in the fall of 2026.
- In 2026, 41 km (25 mi) from the Highway 2 and Highway 13 junction near Assiniboia to the Ardill Access Road was resurfaced. Twelve additional culverts were also added "to improve drainage and support long-term conditions of that roadway".
- In March 2026, it was announced that an additional 6 km (3.7 mi) stretch of Highway 2 North was going to be twinned to meet the demand of traffic. The stretch will be from Redwing north past White Star Road. The project is expected to be completed by the end of 2027.

== Major intersections ==
From south to north:

Rural municipality	Location	km	mi	Destinations	Notes
Old Post No. 43	West Poplar	0.0	0.0	MT 24 south – Glasgow	Continuation into Montana
Old Post No. 43	West Poplar	0.0	0.0	Canada–United States border at Opheim–West Poplar River Border Crossing	
Old Post No. 43	Killdeer	12.0	7.5	Highway 18 west – Mankota, Val Marie	South end of Highway 18 concurrency
Poplar Valley No. 12	Rockglen	49.2	30.6	Highway 18 east – Coronach, Minton	North end of Highway 18 concurrency
Willow Bunch No. 42		69.7	43.3	Highway 705 – Willow Bunch, Wood Mountain	
Old Post No. 43	No major junctions				
Stonehenge No. 73		79.0	49.1	St. Victor Access Road	
Lake of the Rivers No. 72	Assiniboia	103.4	64.2	Highway 13 east (1st Avenue E / Red Coat Trail) – Weyburn	South end of Highway 13 concurrency
Stonehenge No. 73– Lake of the Rivers No. 72 border	Assiniboia	104.8	65.1	Highway 13 west (Red Coat Trail) – Lafleche, Cadillac To Highway 717 east	North end of Highway 13 concurrency
Stonehenge No. 73	No major junctions				
Sutton No. 103		131.0	81.4	Highway 43 west – Gravelbourg	North of Vantage
Lake Johnston No. 102		137.5	85.4	Highway 718 north – Mossbank	
Lake Johnston No. 102	Ardill	149.1	92.6	Highway 715 east – Mitchellton, Galilee	
Terrell No. 101	No major junctions				
Baildon No. 131		175.3	108.9	Highway 36 south – Willow Bunch	
Baildon No. 131		182.5	113.4	Highway 716 east – Briercrest	
Moose Jaw No. 161		202.2	125.6	To Highway 363 west – Bushell Park, CFB Moose Jaw, Hodgeville	
City of Moose Jaw		208.1	129.3	Manitoba Street E to Highway 1 (TCH) east / 2nd Street NE	Highway 2 follows Manitoba Street
City of Moose Jaw		208.5	129.6	Manitoba Street W (Highway 363 west) / Main Street N	Highway 2 follows Main Street
City of Moose Jaw		212.2	131.9	Highway 1 (TCH) – Swift Current, Regina	Interchange; Highway 1 exit 312; south end of Veterans Memorial Highway
Moose Jaw No. 161		225.5	140.1	Highway 202 east – Buffalo Pound Provincial Park	Signed access to Highway 202 for northbound Highway 2
↑ / ↓	Tuxford	229.3	142.5	Highway 202 east / Township Road 190 – Buffalo Pound Provincial Park	Signed access to Highway 202 for southbound Highway 2
Marquis No. 191	Tuxford	230.4	143.2	Highway 42 west – Central Butte, Gardiner Dam	
↑ / ↓		246.5– 247.2	153.2– 153.6	Crosses Buffalo Pound Lake	
Dufferin No. 190		252.2	156.7	Highway 739 east – Bethune	
↑ / ↓		261.9	162.7	Highway 733 west	South end of Highway 733 concurrency
Sarnia No. 221	Chamberlain	263.6	163.8	Highway 11 north (Louis Riel Trail) – Saskatoon Highway 733 east (Valley Road) – Dilke	South end of Highway 11 wrong-way concurrency; north end of Highway 733 concurrency
Dufferin No. 190		275.1	170.9	Highway 11 south (Louis Riel Trail) – Regina	North end of Highway 11 wrong-way concurrency
Sarnia No. 221		282.8	175.7	Highway 733 – Chamberlain, Dilke	
Sarnia No. 221		294.1	182.7	Highway 732 east – Holdfast	South end of Highway 732 concurrency
Sarnia No. 221	Penzance	302.2	187.8	Highway 732 west – Craik	North end of Highway 732 concurrency
Big Arm No. 251	Liberty	315.1	195.8	Highway 749 west – Girvin	
Big Arm No. 251	Imperial	334.6	207.9	Highway 747 west – Davidson	
Wood Creek No. 281		354.0	220.0	Highway 15 – Outlook, Kenaston, Nokomis	
Morris No. 312	Watrous	372.4	231.4	Highway 365 north – Plunkett	
Morris No. 312	Young	395.6	245.8	Highway 670 east – Viscount	
Morris No. 312		397.6	247.1	Highway 763 west (Zelma Access Road) – Zelma, Allan	
Colonsay No. 342		418.7	260.2	Highway 16 (TCH/YH) – Saskatoon, Yorkton	East of Colonsay
Colonsay No. 342	Meacham	434.5	270.0		
↑ / ↓		438.6	272.5	Highway 5 west – Saskatoon	South end of Highway 5 concurrency
Bayne No. 371		444.1	276.0	Highway 5 east – Humboldt	North end of Highway 5 concurrency
Bayne No. 371	Sagehill	455.2	282.8	Dana access road	
Bayne No. 371		460.2	286.0	Highway 27 west – Prud'homme, Aberdeen	
Bayne No. 371		465.3	289.1	Highway 756 east – Bremen	
Hoodoo No. 401		476.8	296.3	Highway 767 west – Smuts	
Hoodoo No. 401	Cudworth	484.0	300.7	Highway 777 east	South end of Highway 777 concurrency
Fish Creek No. 402		487.3	302.8	Highway 777 west – Alvena	North end of Highway 777 concurrency
Fish Creek No. 402	Wakaw	494.8	307.5	Highway 41 – Saskatoon, Melfort	
Fish Creek No. 402	Wakaw	495.4	307.8	Highway 312 west – Rosthern, Waldheim	
St. Louis No. 431		511.7	318.0	Highway 225 west – Batoche	
St. Louis No. 431		512.5	318.5	Highway 320 east – Domremy	
St. Louis No. 431		519.6	322.9	Old Highway 2 north	Former Highway 2 alignment to the old St. Louis Bridge
St. Louis No. 431		528.2	328.2	Highway 25 east – Birch Hills Highway 782 west – St. Louis	
↑ / ↓		529.2	328.8	(New) St. Louis Bridge across South Saskatchewan River	
Prince Albert No. 461		552.6	343.4	Highway 11 south – Saskatoon	North end of Veterans Memorial Highway
City of Prince Albert		557.1	346.2	Marquis Road to Highway 3 east	
City of Prince Albert		559.3	347.5	15th Street W / Highway 3 east / Highway 302 / CanAm Highway – Melfort	CanAm Highway south end; CanAm Highway follows Highway 3 east; south end of Highway 3 concurrency
City of Prince Albert		559.8	347.8	River Street	Grade separated; southbound exit only
City of Prince Albert		559.8– 560.2	347.8– 348.1	Diefenbaker Bridge across North Saskatchewan River	
City of Prince Albert		560.2	348.1	Riverside Drive to Highway 55 east – Nipawin	Interchange, northbound entrance and exit; northbound access to Highway 55 east
City of Prince Albert		561.0	348.6	Highway 3 west / Highway 55 – Nipawin, Shellbrook, The Battlefords	Interchange, north end of Highway 3 concurrency; southbound access to Highway 55 east
Buckland No. 491		571.4	355.1	Highway 780 east – White Star	
Buckland No. 491		578.7	359.6	Pulp Hull Road to Hwy 55	
Buckland No. 491	Spruce Home	581.2	361.1	Highway 355 – Meath Park	
Paddockwood No. 520	Northside	594.2	369.2	Highway 791 east – Paddockwood	
Paddockwood No. 520	Christopher Lake	597.4	371.2	Highway 263 west – Prince Albert National Park	
Lakeland No. 521		622.3	386.7	Highway 953 west – Anglin Lake	
Lakeland No. 521		634.3	394.1	Highway 264 west – Prince Albert National Park, Waskesiu Lake	
Lakeland No. 521		647.6	402.4	Candle Lake Road	Former Highway 969
Northern Administration District		655.7	407.4	Highway 969 east – Montreal Lake	Former Highway 930
Northern Administration District		680.0	422.5	Highway 916 north	
Northern Administration District	Weyakwin	704.1	437.5		
Northern Administration District		723.6	449.6	Highway 936 north (Tracey Road)	
Northern Administration District		745.8	463.4	Highway 165 west – Beauval	South end of Highway 165 concurrency
Northern Administration District		765.5	475.7	Highway 165 east – Creighton	North end of Highway 165 concurrency
Northern Administration District	La Ronge	797.7	495.7	Brown Street Highway 102 / CanAm Highway north – Southend	Continues as Highway 102
1.000 mi = 1.609 km; 1.000 km = 0.621 mi: Concurrency terminus; Incomplete access; Route transition

== See also ==
- Roads in Saskatchewan
- Transportation in Saskatchewan

Preceded by Highway 3	CanAm Highway; Highway 2	Succeeded by Highway 102
