= Colonsay (disambiguation) =

Colonsay is an island north of Islay in Scotland.

Colonsay may also refer to:

- Colonsay, Saskatchewan, a Canadian town
- Rural Municipality of Colonsay No. 342, Saskatchewan, a municipality

== See also ==
- Little Colonsay, an island west of the Isle of Mull, Scotland
