= Redwing, Saskatchewan =

Redwing, Saskatchewan Red Wing
- Hamlet
- Location of Redwing Redwing, Saskatchewan (Canada)
- Coordinates: 53°15′24″N 105°45′32″W
- Country: Canada
- Province: Saskatchewan
- Census division: 15
- Rural Municipality: Buckland

Government
  - Governing body: Buckland No. 491
- Time zone: UTC−06:00 (CST)
- Area code: 306

Redwing, Saskatchewan, Canada, is a small community in the rural municipality (RM) of Buckland No. 491, located on Saskatchewan Highway 2. Redwing and Red Wing Terrace are both localities of Buckland No. 491. Red Wing Terrace is north of the locality of Green Acres on Green Acres Road and south of both Red Wing Terrace Road, and White Star. White Star is located on White Star Road, which is concurrent with Township Road 502 and Saskatchewan Highway 780.

Redwing is 3 km (1.9 mi) north of the city limits of Prince Albert and 6 kilometres (3.7 mi) north of its city centre. Red Wing is 18 km (11 mi) south of Spruce Home. Red Wing Road runs concurrent with Township Road 494, which intersects Saskatchewan Highway 2. For a short time Nesbit Forest post office, located at the legal land description of North West 1/4 Section 8, Township 49, Range 26, West of the 2nd meridian, was the nearest postal location to Red Wing. Prince Albert is located quite near Township 48, Range 26, West of the 2nd meridian.

== Education ==
=== Historical education ===
In 1912, the one-room school house, named RED WING School District #2857, was formed at South East Section 32 Township 49 range 26 West of the 2 Meridian, according to the Provincial Archives of Saskatchewan Regina Branch. This location is just to the northwest of the city of Prince Albert. According to the book, Buckland's Heritage, Margaret Willis was the first teacher.

=== Current education ===
Redwing has an elementary school which is a part of the Saskatchewan Rivers School Division. Red Wing Roman Catholic Separate School Division No. 136 of Saskatchewan was established May 6, 1999.

== Economy ==
A light industrial park has been developed at Redwing via PAREDA, the Prince Albert Regional Economic Development Authority.

It is spelled either Wahpaton, or Wahpeton for the Dakota Sioux Indian reserves. Red Wing was the traditional name for chiefs of the Wahpetonm as they wore a swan's feather dyed red as a sign of their leadership position.
