= Saskatchewan Highway 355 =

Provincial highway in Saskatchewan, Canada

Highway 355

Route information
- Maintained by Ministry of Highways and Infrastructure
- Length: 45.3 km (28.1 mi)

Major junctions
- West end: Highway 788 in Sturgeon Lake First Nation
- CanAm Highway / Highway 2 at Spruce Home
- East end: Highway 55 at Meath Park

Location
- Country: Canada
- Province: Saskatchewan
- Rural municipalities: Garden River, Buckland

Highway system
- Provincial highways in Saskatchewan
← Highway 354	→ Highway 357

Highway 355 is a provincial highway in the Canadian province of Saskatchewan. It runs from the Sturgeon Lake First Nation, where it transitions into Highway 788, to Highway 55 (Northern Woods and Water Route) at Meath Park. It is about 45 kilometres (28 mi) long.

Highway 355 passes near the town of Albertville and passes through the communities of Henribourg, Spruce Home at its intersection with the CanAm Highway (Highway 2), and Alingly.

== Route description ==
Highway 355 begins at the very western edge of the Rural Municipality of Buckland No. 491 near the banks of the Sturgeon River at the eastern end of Sturgeon Lake via the junction with Greig Road (which provides access to the Sturgeon Lake First Nation), with the road continuing west towards Sturgeon Lake Regional Park as Highway 788. It traverses a switchback as it heads southeast as a paved two-lane highway through a mix of farmland and wooded areas for several kilometres, passing through Alingly and crossing the Spruce River before passing through the hamlet of Spruce Home, where it crosses the CanAm Highway (Hwy 2). Continuing eastward through rural areas, the pavement transitions to gravel as the highway passes through Henribourg, where it crosses both a former railway line and the Garden River, and curves northeastward to have intersections with both Paddockwood Road (leads north to Paddockwood) and St. James Avenue N (leads south to Albertville). Entering the Rural Municipality of Garden River No. 490, Highway 355 winds its way through rural farmland parallel to the former railway for several kilometres to enter the southern edge of Meath Park, where it comes to an end at a junction with Highway 55 (Northern Woods and Water Route) just west of that highway's intersection with Highway 120.

== Major intersections ==
From west to east:

Rural municipality	Location	km	mi	Destinations	Notes
Buckland No. 491	Sturgeon Lake 101	0.0	0.0	Highway 788 west – Sturgeon Lake Regional Park, Deer Ridge, Holbein Greig Road – Sturgeon Lake First Nation	Western terminus; eastern terminus of Hwy 788; road continues as Hwy 788 westbound
Buckland No. 491		15.4	9.6	Bridge over the Spruce River	
Buckland No. 491	Spruce Home	17.3	10.7	CanAm Highway / Highway 2 – Prince Albert, La Ronge	
Buckland No. 491	Spruce Home	17.7	11.0	Western end of unpaved section	
Buckland No. 491	Henribourg	27.7	17.2	Bridge over the Garden River	
Buckland No. 491		30.8	19.1	Paddockwood Road (Range Road 2251) to Highway 791 – Paddockwood	
Buckland No. 491 / Garden River No. 490 boundary		32.6	20.3	St. James Avenue N – Albertville	
Garden River No. 490	Meath Park	44.8	27.8	2nd Street W – Meath Park	
Garden River No. 490	Meath Park	45.3	28.1	Highway 55 (NWWR) – Nipawin, Prince Albert	Eastern terminus; eastern end of unpaved section
1.000 mi = 1.609 km; 1.000 km = 0.621 mi

== See also ==
- Transportation in Saskatchewan
- Roads in Saskatchewan
