= Northside, Saskatchewan =

Hamlet in Saskatchewan, Canada

Coordinates: 53°30′38″N 105°45′56″W

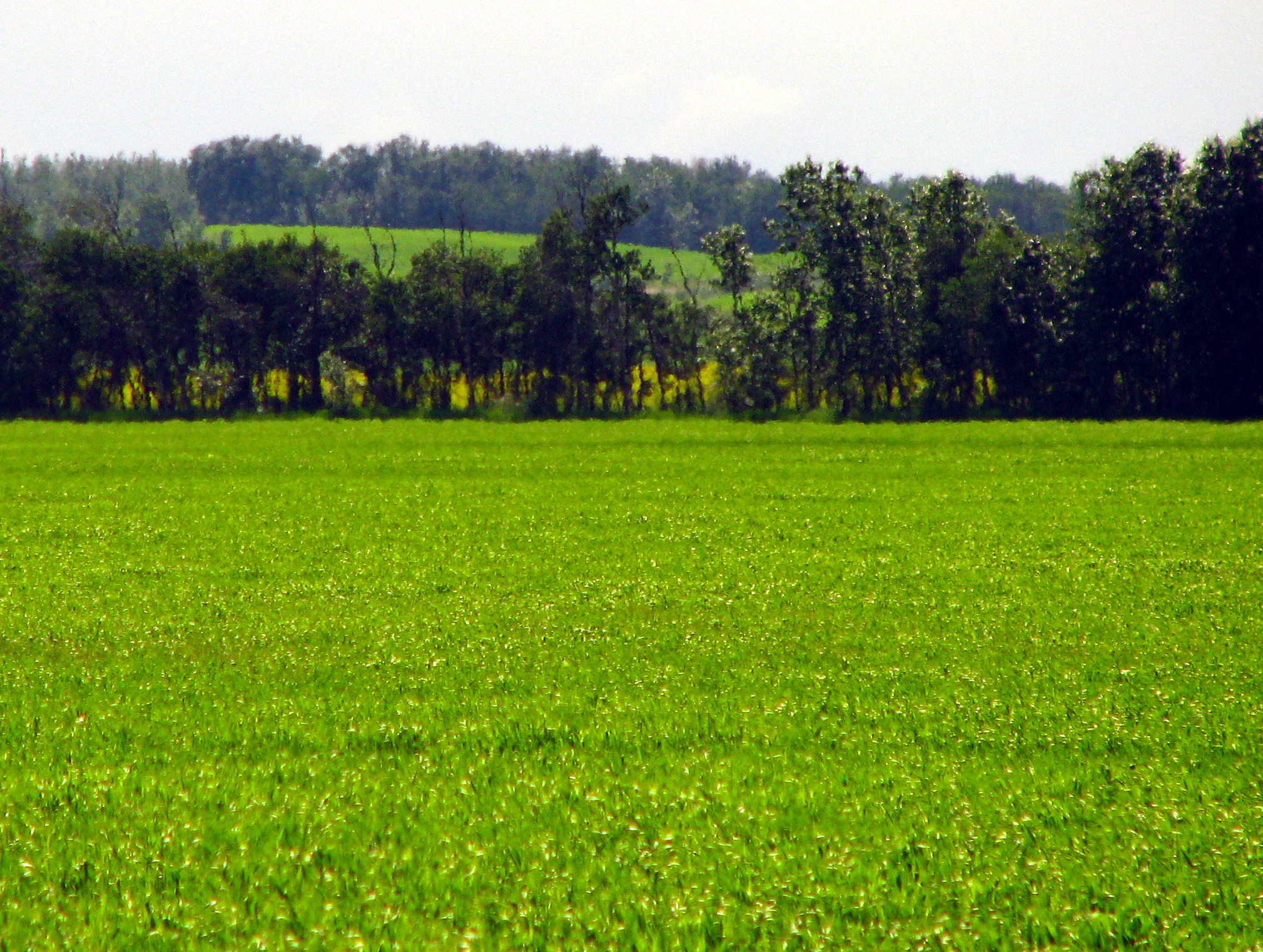
A field in Northside

Northside is an Organized hamlet in the Canadian province of Saskatchewan. Located in the Rural Municipality of Paddockwood No. 520, it lies at the junction between the CanAm Highway (Highway 2) and Highway 791 (Paddockwood Access Road).

== Demographics ==
In the 2021 Census of Population conducted by Statistics Canada, Northside had a population of 35 living in 21 of its 23 total private dwellings, a change of 16.7% from its 2016 population of 30. With a land area of 0.31 km^{2} (0.12 sq mi), it had a population density of 112.9/km^{2} (292.4/sq mi) in 2021.
