= St. Louis Bridge =

Bridge across the South Saskatchewan River in Saskatchewan, Canada

St. Louis (Grand Trunk Pacific Railway) Bridge
- Coordinates: 52.925°N 105.808°W
- Carries: Traffic (Hwy 2) (closed)
- Crosses: South Saskatchewan River
- Locale: St. Louis / Prince Albert No. 461, Saskatchewan, Canada
- Official name: St. Louis Bridge

Characteristics
- Material: Steel
- Total length: 1,250 feet (380 m)

History
- Construction end: 1915
- Opened: April 1915

Location
- Interactive map of St. Louis (Grand Trunk Pacific Railway) Bridge

The St. Louis Bridge is a Canadian traffic bridge (and former railway bridge) that spans the South Saskatchewan River at St. Louis, Saskatchewan. It crosses the river from St. Louis into the Rural Municipality of Prince Albert No. 461. After having been closed for many years, the bridge reopened in October 2014.

The bridge was built by the Grand Trunk Pacific Railway opening to rail traffic in 1915. In March 1928 work was completed on the attachment of two roadways onto the bridge, opening to traffic on May 9, 1928. The bridge continued to support the Canadian National Railway use until 1983 when the rail line was abandoned. The bridge was subsequently modified to carry road traffic on the former rail bed.

Construction of a new bridge to carry Highway 2 over the river was undertaken in the early 2010s 1.6 km east of the old bridge. It is possible that the old bridge will be demolished after the new one is completed. The new bridge was completed in the fall of 2014 at a cost of $30 million.

== See also ==
- List of crossings of the South Saskatchewan River
- List of bridges in Canada
- List of road-rail bridges
