= Rural Municipality of Buckland No. 491 =

Rural municipality in Saskatchewan, Canada

Buckland No. 491
- Rural municipality
- Rural Municipality of Buckland No. 491
- Location of the RM of Buckland No. 491 in Saskatchewan
- Coordinates: 53.303°N 105.850°W
- Country: Canada
- Province: Saskatchewan
- Census division: 15
- SARM division: 5
- Formed: December 11, 1911

Government
  - Reeve: Don Fyrk
  - Governing body: RM of Buckland No. 491 Council
  - Administrator: Cori Sarginson
  - Office location: Prince Albert

Area (2016)
  - Land: 791.69 km^{2} (305.67 sq mi)

Population (2016)
  - Total: 3,375
  - Density: 4.3/km^{2} (11/sq mi)
- Time zone: CST
  - Summer (DST): CST
- Area codes: 306 and 639
- Website: Official website

The Rural Municipality of Buckland No. 491 (2016 population: 3,375) is a rural municipality (RM) in the Canadian province of Saskatchewan within Census Division No. 15 and SARM Division No. 5. It is located near the City of Prince Albert.

== History ==
The RM of Buckland No. 491 incorporated as a rural municipality on December 11, 1911.

== Geography ==
Rural municipalities that neighbour the RM of Buckland No. 491 include the RM of Shellbrook No. 493 to the west, the RM of Paddockwood No. 520 to the north, the RM of Garden River No. 490 to the east, and the RM of Prince Albert No. 461 to the south.

=== Communities and localities ===
The following communities are located within the RM.

- Alingly
- Henribourg
- Little Red River IR #106C
- Redwing
- Spruce Home
- Sturgeon Lake IR #101
- Wahpaton 94A Indian reserve
- White Star

== Demographics ==
Population history (1981–2016)
Year	Pop.	±%
1981	3,328	—
1986	3,460	+4.0%
1991	3,556	+2.8%
1996	3,444	−3.1%
2001	3,529	+2.5%
2006	3,429	−2.8%
2011	3,658	+6.7%
2016	3,375	−7.7%
Source: Statistics Canada via Saskatchewan Bureau of Statistics

In the 2021 Census of Population conducted by Statistics Canada, the RM of Buckland No. 491 had a population of 3,277 living in 1,237 of its 1,317 total private dwellings, a change of −2.9% from its 2016 population of 3,375. With a land area of 787.35 km^{2} (304.00 sq mi), it had a population density of 4.2/km^{2} (10.8/sq mi) in 2021.

In the 2016 Census of Population, the RM of Buckland No. 491 recorded a population of 3,375 living in 1,237 of its 1,311 total private dwellings, a −7.7% change from its 2011 population of 3,658. With a land area of 791.69 km^{2} (305.67 sq mi), it had a population density of 4.3/km^{2} (11.0/sq mi) in 2016.

== Government ==
The RM of Buckland No. 491 is governed by an elected municipal council and an appointed administrator that meets on the second Monday of every month. The reeve of the RM is Don Fyrk while its administrator is Cori Sarginson. The RM's office is located in Prince Albert.

Buckland federal election results
Year	Liberal		Conservative		New Democratic		Green	
2021	8%	124	67%	1,023	13%	200	1%	15
2019	8%	128	74%	1,238	14%	236	2%	35

Buckland provincial election results
Year	Saskatchewan		New Democratic	
2020	57%	969	32%	545
2016	70%	1,050	27%	397

== Transportation ==
Roads

- Highway 355—serves Albertville and Alingly
- Highway 2

== See also ==
- List of rural municipalities in Saskatchewan
