= St. Victor, Saskatchewan =

Community in Saskatchewan, Canada

Coordinates: 49.436°N 105.871°W

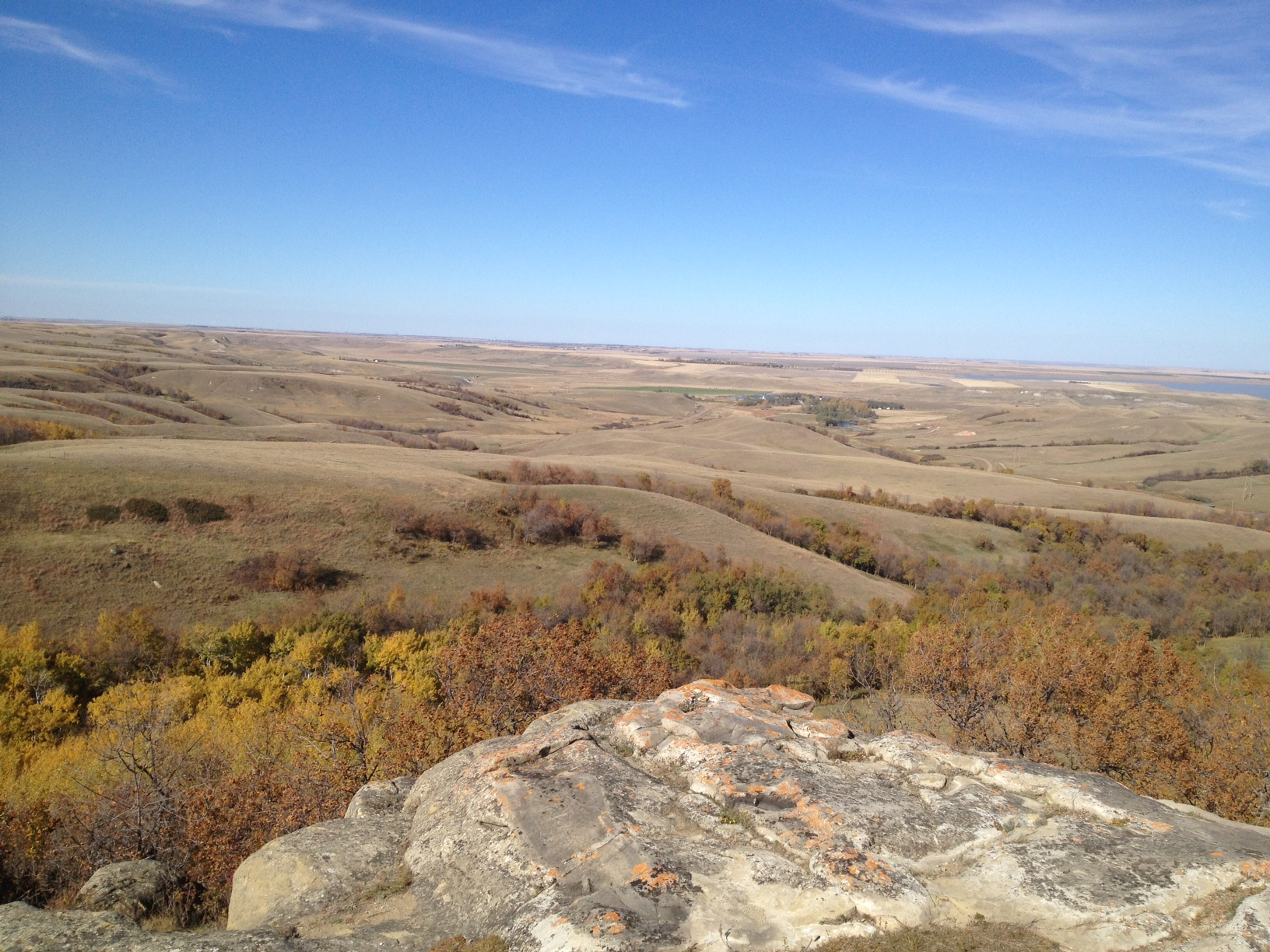
The view of the sandstone cliff at St. Victor Petroglyph Provincial Park

St. Victor, or Saint Victor, is a Fransaskois community in the Rural Municipality of Willow Bunch No. 42. In 2006, it had a population of 43 people. It previously held the status of village until February 26, 2003. St. Victor is located 37 km south of the town of Assiniboia 10 km east of Highway 2. St. Victor Petroglyphs Provincial Park is two kilometres south of the community.

== Demographics ==
In the 2021 Census of Population conducted by Statistics Canada, St. Victor had a population of 25 living in 16 of its 20 total private dwellings, a change of 25% from its 2016 population of 20. With a land area of 0.24 km^{2} (0.093 sq mi), it had a population density of 104.2/km^{2} (269.8/sq mi) in 2021.

== See also ==
- List of communities in Saskatchewan
