= Penzance, Saskatchewan =

Community in Saskatchewan, Canada

Penzance
- Special service area
- Special Service Area of Penzance
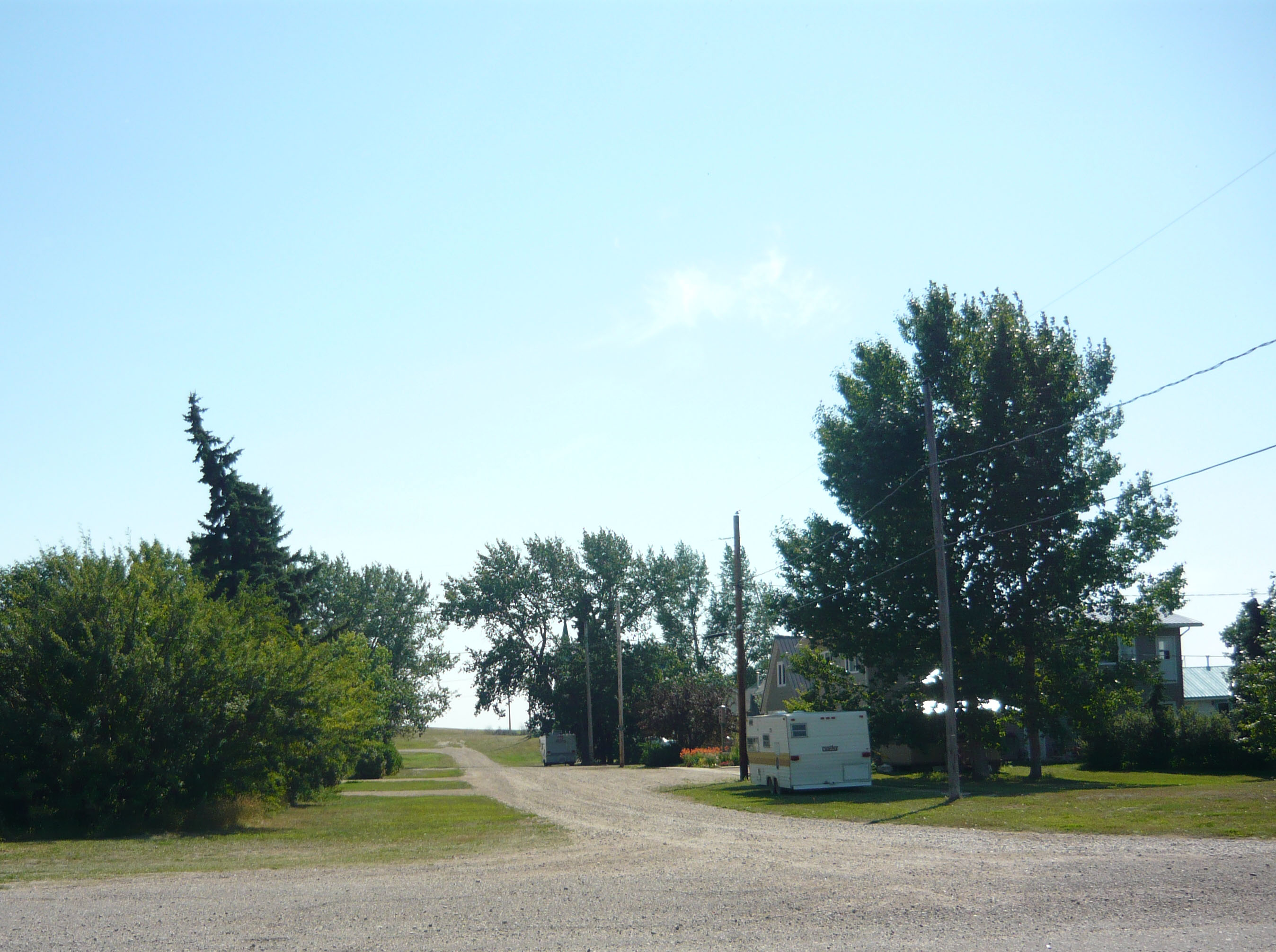
- Saskatchewan Avenue

- Location within Saskatchewan Location within Canada
- Coordinates: 51.059°N 105.437°W
- Country: Canada
- Province: Saskatchewan
- Census division: 6
- Rural municipality: Sarnia No. 221

Area
  - Total: 0.62 km^{2} (0.24 sq mi)

Population (2001)
  - Total: 41
  - Density: 65.7/km^{2} (170/sq mi)
- Time zone: CST
- Postal code: S0G3X0
- Area code: 306
- Highways: Highway 2 Highway 732
- Waterways: Last Mountain Lake

Penzance is a special service area in the Rural Municipality of Sarnia No. 221, in the Canadian province of Saskatchewan. It held village status prior to January 31, 2008. The community is located 88 km north of the City of Moose Jaw on Highway 2. Penzance was named after the original Penzance, in Cornwall, England.

== Demographics ==
In the 2021 Census of Population conducted by Statistics Canada, Penzance had a population of 30 living in 13 of its 16 total private dwellings, a change of 20% from its 2016 population of 25. With a land area of 0.65 km^{2} (0.25 sq mi), it had a population density of 46.2/km^{2} (119.5/sq mi) in 2021.

== See also ==
- List of communities in Saskatchewan
- List of hamlets in Saskatchewan
