= Scout Lake =

Community in Saskatchewan, Canada

Coordinates: 49°21′55″N 106°00′03″W

Scout Lake is a hamlet in the Canadian province of Saskatchewan. Access is from Highway 2.

== Demographics ==
In the 2021 Census of Population conducted by Statistics Canada, Scout Lake had a population of 10 living in 8 of its 12 total private dwellings, a change of 0% from its 2016 population of 10. With a land area of 0.35 km^{2} (0.14 sq mi), it had a population density of 28.6/km^{2} (74.0/sq mi) in 2021.

== See also ==
- List of communities in Saskatchewan
