= Stalwart, Saskatchewan =

Hamlet in Saskatchewan, Canada

Stalwart
- Hamlet
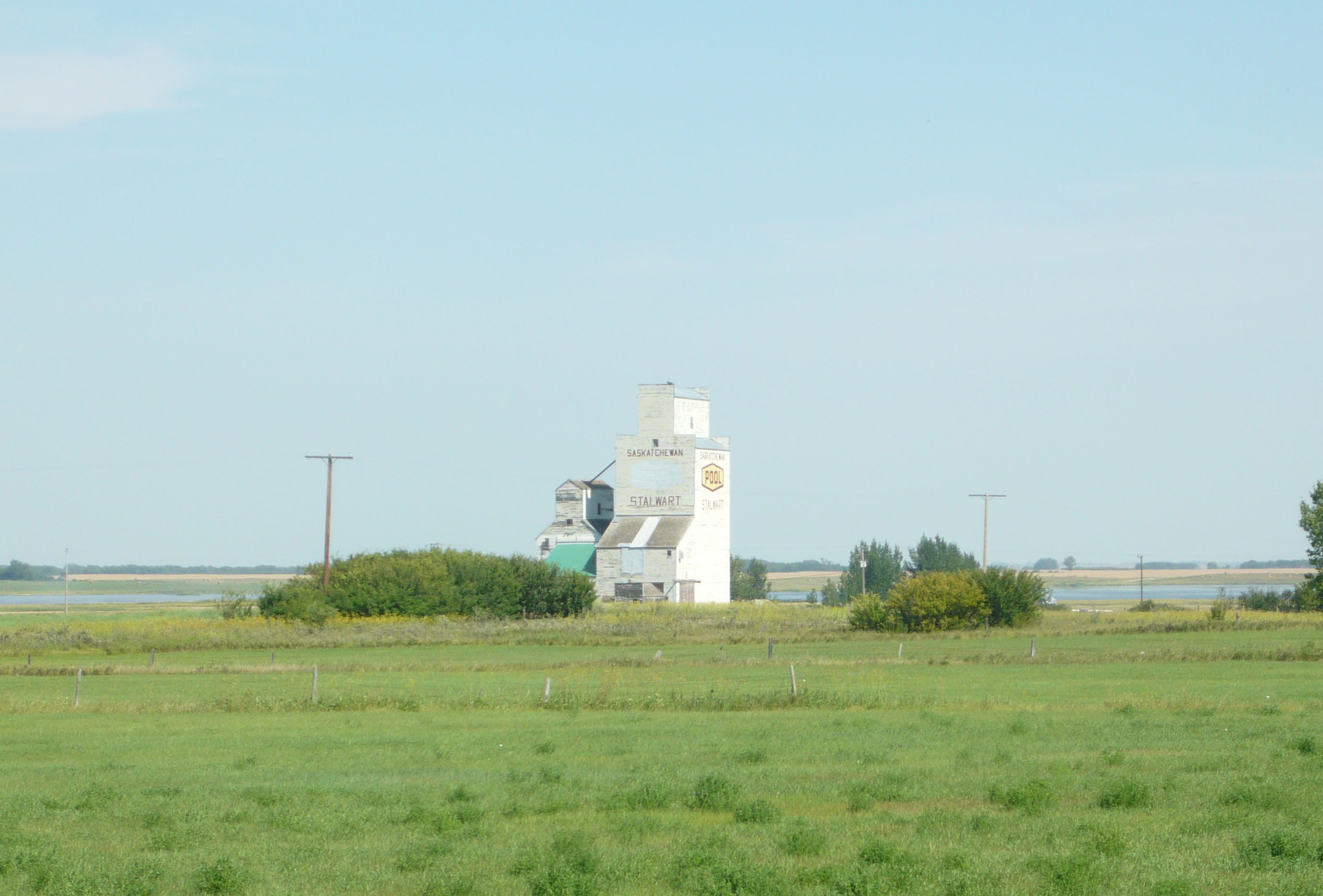
- Stalwart grain elevator
- Interactive map of Stalwart
- Location in Saskatchewan Stalwart (Canada)
- Coordinates: 51.229948°N 105.441716°W
- Country: Canada
- Province: Saskatchewan
- Rural municipality: Big Arm No. 251
- Highways: Highway 2

Stalwart is a hamlet in Saskatchewan. Access is from Highway 2.

== See slso ==
- List of communities in Saskatchewan
