= Liberty, Saskatchewan =

Liberty
- Village
- Village of Liberty
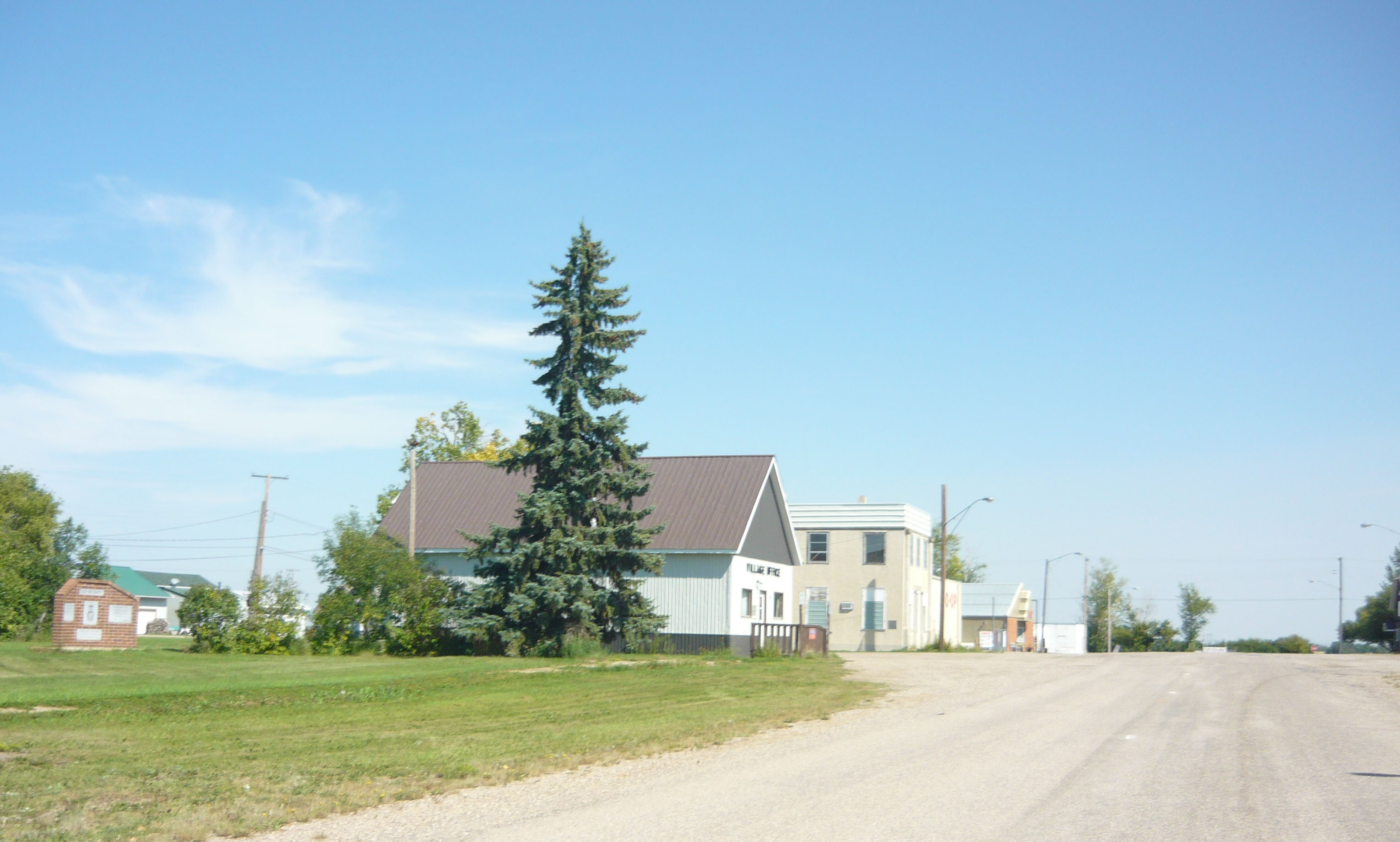
- Lincoln Street

- Location of Liberty in Saskatchewan Liberty (Canada)
- Coordinates: 51°09′11″N 105°26′13″W
- Country: Canada
- Province: Saskatchewan
- Region: Central
- Census division: 11
- Rural Municipality: Big Arm No. 251

Government
  - Type: Municipal
  - Governing body: Liberty Village Council
  - Mayor: Jennifer Langlois
  - Administrator: Yvonne (Bonny) Goodsman

Area
  - Total: 1.37 km^{2} (0.53 sq mi)

Population (2021)
  - Total: 68
  - Density: 57.1/km^{2} (148/sq mi)
- Time zone: UTC−06:00 (CST)
- Postal code: S0G 3A0
- Area code: 306
- Highways: Highway 2 Highway 749
- Railways: Canadian Pacific Railway

Liberty (2016 population: 78) is a village in the Canadian province of Saskatchewan within the Rural Municipality of Big Arm No. 251 and Census Division No. 11. The village is located along Highway 2, 120 km (75 mi) north of the City of Regina.

== History ==
Liberty incorporated as a village on January 23, 1912.

== Demographics ==
Population history (1981–2016)
Year	Pop.	±%
1981	135	—
1986	134	−0.7%
1991	128	−4.5%
1996	101	−21.1%
2001	94	−6.9%
2006	73	−22.3%
2011	88	+20.5%
2016	78	−11.4%
Source: Statistics Canada via Saskatchewan Bureau of Statistics

In the 2021 Census of Population conducted by Statistics Canada, Liberty had a population of 68 living in 36 of its 42 total private dwellings, a change of −12.8% from its 2016 population of 78. With a land area of 1.42 km^{2} (0.55 sq mi), it had a population density of 47.9/km^{2} (124.0/sq mi) in 2021.

In the 2016 Census of Population, the Village of Liberty recorded a population of 78 living in 38 of its 50 total private dwellings, a −12.8% change from its 2011 population of 88. With a land area of 1.37 km^{2} (0.53 sq mi), it had a population density of 56.9/km^{2} (147.5/sq mi) in 2016.

== See also ==
- List of communities in Saskatchewan
- List of francophone communities in Saskatchewan
- List of villages in Saskatchewan
