= Weyakwin =

Community in Saskatchewan, Canada

Coordinates: 54°25′38″N 105°47′19″W

Location of Weyakwin in Saskatchewan

Weyakwin is a northern hamlet in the Canadian province of Saskatchewan. It is situated along Highway 2 on the south bank of Weyakwin River. The Weyakwin River flows from Weyakwin Lake east to Montreal Lake.

== Name ==
The name of the community comes from the Cree language, meaning Foul or profane language.

The community is known in Cree as ᐏᔭᐦᑵᐏᓂᕽ wiyahkwêwinihk.

== Demographics ==
In the 2021 Census of Population conducted by Statistics Canada, Weyakwin had a population of 100 living in 30 of its 36 total private dwellings, a change of −2% from its 2016 population of 102. With a land area of 5.27 km^{2} (2.03 sq mi), it had a population density of 19.0/km^{2} (49.1/sq mi) in 2021.

== See also ==
- List of communities in Saskatchewan
