= White Star, Saskatchewan =

Community in Saskatchewan, Canada

Coordinates: 53°18′N 105°44′W

White Star, is an unincorporated community north of Saskatchewan's third largest city, Prince Albert, Saskatchewan, Canada. White Star is located within the Rural Municipality of Buckland No. 491. The community is located on Highway 780 and the Viterra inland terminal is served by Carlton Trail Railway.

The White Star post-office opened on July 1, 1914 and was in operation until December 31, 1964.

== See also ==
- List of communities in Saskatchewan
