= West Poplar =

Coordinates: 49°00′00″N 106°22′02″W

Location of West Poplar in Saskatchewan

West Poplar is the name given to the Canadian side of a border crossing on the Saskatchewan and Montana border. It is located about three and a half hours southwest of Regina, Saskatchewan. The international border crosses into Valley County, Montana, north of the town of Opheim.

== Climate ==
Climate data for West Poplar
Month	Jan	Feb	Mar	Apr	May	Jun	Jul	Aug	Sep	Oct	Nov	Dec	Year
Record high °C (°F)	13 (55)	16 (61)	22.5 (72.5)	31 (88)	37 (99)	41 (106)	38.3 (100.9)	40 (104)	37 (99)	29 (84)	24 (75)	12 (54)	41 (106)
Mean daily maximum °C (°F)	−7.7 (18.1)	−4.3 (24.3)	2.6 (36.7)	11.6 (52.9)	18.2 (64.8)	23 (73)	26.1 (79.0)	26.1 (79.0)	19.4 (66.9)	12 (54)	1.3 (34.3)	−5.5 (22.1)	10.2 (50.4)
Daily mean °C (°F)	−13.4 (7.9)	−9.7 (14.5)	−3.2 (26.2)	4.6 (40.3)	10.8 (51.4)	15.6 (60.1)	18.2 (64.8)	17.7 (63.9)	11.5 (52.7)	5.1 (41.2)	−4.5 (23.9)	−11.1 (12.0)	3.5 (38.3)
Mean daily minimum °C (°F)	−19.1 (−2.4)	−15.1 (4.8)	−8.9 (16.0)	−2.5 (27.5)	3.4 (38.1)	8.2 (46.8)	10.2 (50.4)	9.3 (48.7)	3.5 (38.3)	−1.8 (28.8)	−10.2 (13.6)	−16.8 (1.8)	−3.3 (26.1)
Record low °C (°F)	−45.6 (−50.1)	−45 (−49)	−44 (−47)	−28.9 (−20.0)	−11.1 (12.0)	−5.5 (22.1)	0 (32)	−4 (25)	−16 (3)	−28 (−18)	−35.5 (−31.9)	−43.3 (−45.9)	−45.6 (−50.1)
Average precipitation mm (inches)	19 (0.7)	13.6 (0.54)	21.2 (0.83)	22.1 (0.87)	59.1 (2.33)	69.7 (2.74)	60.5 (2.38)	36.6 (1.44)	33.2 (1.31)	21.3 (0.84)	15.3 (0.60)	22.3 (0.88)	393.7 (15.50)
Source: Environment Canada

== See also ==
- Opheim–West Poplar River Border Crossing
- West Poplar Airport
