= Rural Municipality of Big Arm No. 251 =

Rural municipality in Saskatchewan, Canada

Big Arm No. 251
- Rural municipality
- Rural Municipality of Big Arm No. 251
- Location of the RM of Big Arm No. 251 in Saskatchewan
- Coordinates: 51.261°N 105.260°W
- Country: Canada
- Province: Saskatchewan
- Census division: 11
- SARM division: 5
- Formed: December 11, 1911

Government
  - Reeve: Sheldon Vance
  - Governing body: RM of Big Arm No. 251 Council
  - Administrator: Yvonne (Bonny) Goodsman
  - Office location: Imperial

Area (2016)
  - Land: 699.32 km^{2} (270.01 sq mi)

Population (2016)
  - Total: 191
  - Density: 0.3/km^{2} (0.78/sq mi)
- Time zone: CST
  - Summer (DST): CST
- Area codes: 306 and 639

The Rural Municipality of Big Arm No. 251 (2016 population: 191) is a rural municipality (RM) in the Canadian province of Saskatchewan within Census Division No. 11 and SARM Division No. 5. It is located in the southern portion of the province near Last Mountain Lake northwest of Regina.

== History ==
The RM of Big Arm No. 251 incorporated as a rural municipality on December 11, 1911.

== Geography ==
=== Communities and localities ===
The following urban municipalities are surrounded by the RM.

Towns

- Imperial

Villages

- Liberty

Resort villages

- Etters Beach

The following unincorporated communities are located within the RM:

Unincorporated hamlets

- Hendersons Beach
- Stalwart

=== Protected areas ===
There are two National Wildlife Areas at least partially within the RM as well as one Migratory Bird Sanctuary. The overlapping Last Mountain Lake Bird Sanctuary and Last Mountain Lake National Wildlife Area encompass the northern end of Last Mountain Lake with the south-west corner of the protected areas being within the north-east corner of the RM of Big Arm.

Stalwart National Wildlife Area is entirely within the RM.

== Demographics ==
Population history (1981–2016)
Year	Pop.	±%
1981	369	—
1986	352	−4.6%
1991	330	−6.2%
1996	299	−9.4%
2001	250	−16.4%
2006	237	−5.2%
2011	200	−15.6%
2016	191	−4.5%
Source: Statistics Canada via Saskatchewan Bureau of Statistics

In the 2021 Census of Population conducted by Statistics Canada, the RM of Big Arm No. 251 had a population of 184 living in 80 of its 118 total private dwellings, a change of −3.7% from its 2016 population of 191. With a land area of 689.35 km^{2} (266.16 sq mi), it had a population density of 0.3/km^{2} (0.7/sq mi) in 2021.

In the 2016 Census of Population, the RM of Big Arm No. 251 recorded a population of 191 living in 81 of its 126 total private dwellings, a −4.5% change from its 2011 population of 200. With a land area of 699.32 km^{2} (270.01 sq mi), it had a population density of 0.3/km^{2} (0.7/sq mi) in 2016.

== Government ==
The RM of Big Arm No. 251 is governed by an elected municipal council and an appointed administrator that meets on the second Monday of every month. The reeve of the RM is Sheldon Vance while its administrator is Yvonne (Bonny) Goodsman. The RM's office is located in Imperial.
