= Bushell Park =

Locality in Saskatchewan, Canada

Coordinates: 50°20′23″N 105°33′21″W

Location of Bushell Park in Saskatchewan

Bushell Park is an unincorporated community in Saskatchewan. It is located on Saskatchewan Highway 2, approximately 5 km (3.1 mi) south of Moose Jaw. It is a part of 15 Wing CFB Moose Jaw, home of the Snowbirds Canadian flight demonstration team and 2 Canadian Forces Flight Training School, where Phase II Canadian Forces pilot training is conducted.

== History ==
The community was organized in 1952 to provide housing for staff and students at the nearby air force base. The community was formally opened on September 19, 1952 by Sybil Bushell of Fort Qu'Appelle. The community was named for his son, Christopher Bushell, who was killed in action during World War II. Bushell Park provides residence for military members and their families residing in RHUs (Residential Housing Units), as well as a small retail centre.
