= Meacham, Saskatchewan =

Village in Saskatchewan, Canada

Meacham
- Village
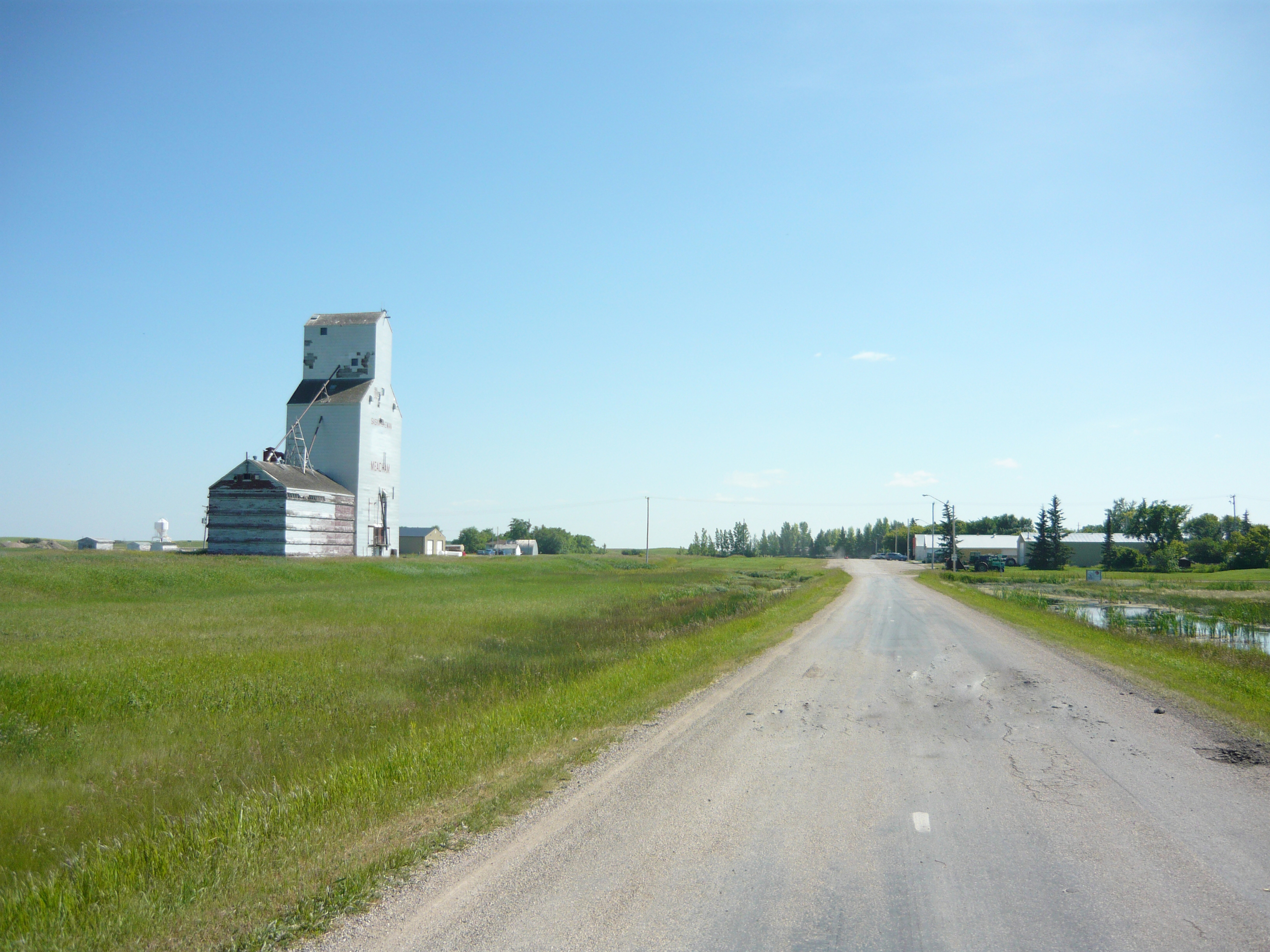
- Railway Avenue

- Location of Meacham in Saskatchewan Meacham (Canada)
- Coordinates: 52.106°N 105.768°W
- Country: Canada
- Province: Saskatchewan
- Census division: 11
- Rural municipality: Colonsay No. 342
- Post office Founded: 1912-08-01

Government
  - Type: Mayor/Council
  - Mayor: Travis Harriman
  - Administrator: Juanita Bendig
  - Governing body: Meacham Village Council

Area
  - Total: 1.27 km^{2} (0.49 sq mi)

Population (2016)
  - Total: 99
  - Density: 66.1/km^{2} (171/sq mi)
- Time zone: CST
- Postal code: S0K 2V0
- Area code: 306
- Highways: Highway 2

Meacham (2016 population: 99) is a village in the Canadian province of Saskatchewan within the Rural Municipality of Colonsay No. 342 and Census Division No. 11. It is located 69 kilometres east of the city of Saskatoon on Highway 2.

== History ==
Meacham incorporated as a village on June 19, 1912.

== Demographics ==
Population history (1981–2016)
| Year | Pop. | ±% |
|---|---|---|
| 1981 | 178 | — |
| 1986 | 138 | −22.5% |
| 1991 | 116 | −15.9% |
| 1996 | 79 | −31.9% |
| 2001 | 90 | +13.9% |
| 2006 | 70 | −22.2% |
| 2011 | 84 | +20.0% |
| 2016 | 99 | +17.9% |
Source: Statistics Canada via Saskatchewan Bureau of Statistics

In the 2021 Census of Population conducted by Statistics Canada, Meacham had a population of 96 living in 46 of its 51 total private dwellings, a change of −3% from its 2016 population of 99. With a land area of 1.26 km^{2} (0.49 sq mi), it had a population density of 76.2/km^{2} (197.3/sq mi) in 2021.

In the 2016 Census of Population, the Village of Meacham recorded a population of 99 living in 43 of its 55 total private dwellings, a 15.2% change from its 2011 population of 84. With a land area of 1.27 km^{2} (0.49 sq mi), it had a population density of 78.0/km^{2} (201.9/sq mi) in 2016.

== Arts and culture ==
The village is home to Dancing Sky Theatre, which has produced Canadian plays in Meacham since 1997. The theatre has launched many original productions, and has mounted tours for 10 of its shows.

== See also ==
- List of communities in Saskatchewan
- List of francophone communities in Saskatchewan
- List of villages in Saskatchewan
