= Colonsay, Saskatchewan =

Town in Saskatchewan, Canada

Colonsay
- Town
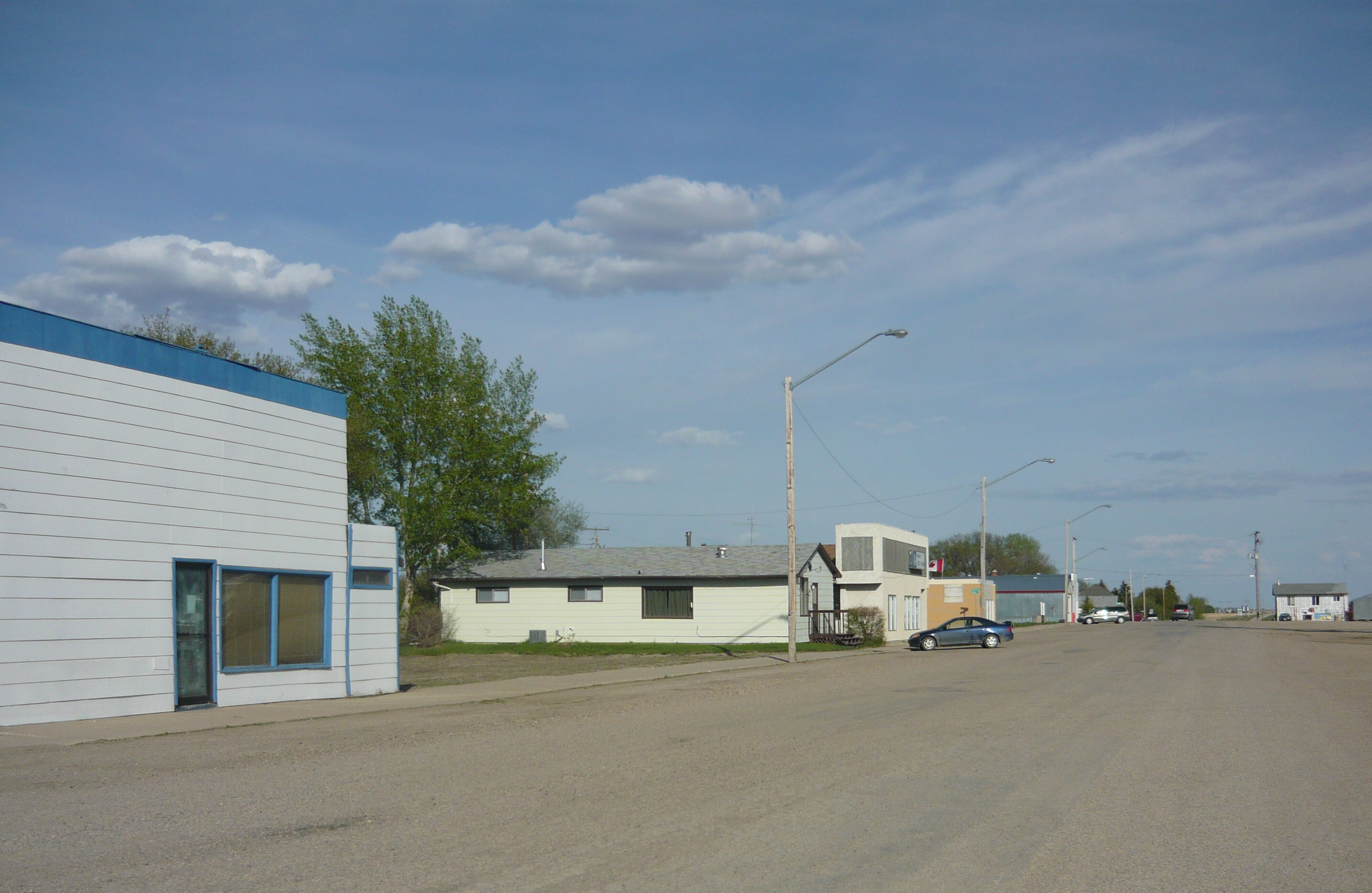
- Railway Avenue
- Motto: "Isle of the Prairies"
- Location of Colonsay in Saskatchewan Colonsay (Canada)
- Coordinates: 51°59′N 105°53′W
- Country: Canada
- Province: Saskatchewan
- Rural Municipalities (R.M.): Colonsay No. 342
- Post office Founded: 1908-05-21
- Village established: 1907
- Town incorporated: 1910

Government
  - Mayor: James Gray
  - Federal Electoral District Blackstrap (historical riding Rosthern) MP: Lynne Yelich
  - provincial electoral districts Constituency of Humboldt MLA: Donna Harpauer

Area
  - Total: 6.4 km^{2} (2.46 sq mi)

Population (2011)
  - Total: 475
  - Density: 193.1/km^{2} (500/sq mi)
  - Summer (DST): CST

Colonsay /kəˈlɒnziː/ is a town in the Rural Municipality of Colonsay No. 342, in the Canadian province of Saskatchewan. Colonsay is located on Highway 16 (the Yellowhead Highway part of the Trans-Canada Highway) running east–west in central Saskatchewan near the intersection with Highway 2.

Colonsay derived its name from the Inner Hebrides Scottish island of Colonsay. All the streets in the village are also named after islands located along the west coast of Scotland.

== History ==
Colonsay experienced a record setting 167-day-long frost-free period in 1978, which was, to the dismay of a number of residents, still not a long enough growing season for yams or sweet potatoes.

The ship U-Sea Colonsay is named after the local potash mine.

== Demographics ==
In the 2021 Census of Population conducted by Statistics Canada, Colonsay had a population of 446 living in 181 of its 199 total private dwellings, a change of −1.1% from its 2016 population of 451. With a land area of 2.4 km^{2} (0.93 sq mi), it had a population density of 185.8/km^{2} (481.3/sq mi) in 2021.

Canada census – Colonsay community profile

	2021	2011
Population	446 (-1.1% from 2016)	475 (+11.8% from 2006)
Land area	2.40 km^{2} (0.93 sq mi)	2.46 km^{2} (0.95 sq mi)
Population density	185.9/km^{2} (481/sq mi)	193.1/km^{2} (500/sq mi)
Median age	40.0 (M: 38.4, F: 43.6)	38.8 (M: 37.6, F: 39.6)
Private dwellings	199 (total) 181 (occupied)	202 (total)
Median household income	$85,000

References: 2021 2011

== Climate ==
Climate data for Colonsay
Month	Jan	Feb	Mar	Apr	May	Jun	Jul	Aug	Sep	Oct	Nov	Dec	Year
Record high °C (°F)	7 (45)	9 (48)	19 (66)	31 (88)	37.2 (99.0)	40 (104)	37 (99)	36.1 (97.0)	33.5 (92.3)	27.8 (82.0)	19.4 (66.9)	10 (50)	40 (104)
Mean daily maximum °C (°F)	−10.6 (12.9)	−8.3 (17.1)	−0.9 (30.4)	9.7 (49.5)	18.1 (64.6)	22.3 (72.1)	24.7 (76.5)	23.7 (74.7)	17 (63)	10.1 (50.2)	−1.9 (28.6)	−9.5 (14.9)	7.9 (46.2)
Daily mean °C (°F)	−15.4 (4.3)	−12.9 (8.8)	−5.6 (21.9)	4.1 (39.4)	11.8 (53.2)	16.3 (61.3)	18.6 (65.5)	17.4 (63.3)	11.2 (52.2)	4.7 (40.5)	−5.9 (21.4)	−14 (7)	2.5 (36.5)
Mean daily minimum °C (°F)	−20.3 (−4.5)	−17.6 (0.3)	−10.3 (13.5)	−1.6 (29.1)	5.4 (41.7)	10.2 (50.4)	12.4 (54.3)	10.9 (51.6)	5.4 (41.7)	−0.8 (30.6)	−10 (14)	−18.5 (−1.3)	−2.9 (26.8)
Record low °C (°F)	−44.4 (−47.9)	−39 (−38)	−36.7 (−34.1)	−24.4 (−11.9)	−7 (19)	1 (34)	4 (39)	−1.5 (29.3)	−5 (23)	−21 (−6)	−32 (−26)	−47 (−53)	−47 (−53)
Average precipitation mm (inches)	11.8 (0.46)	9.8 (0.39)	10.5 (0.41)	21.8 (0.86)	46.3 (1.82)	59.1 (2.33)	64.9 (2.56)	47.4 (1.87)	31.8 (1.25)	17.9 (0.70)	9.4 (0.37)	13.8 (0.54)	344.4 (13.56)
Source: Environment Canada

== Economy ==
The main economy of the area is agriculture featuring grain crops such as wheat, canola, barley, oats, rye, as well as lentils and peas. Livestock raised in the vicinity are cattle, hogs, sheep, and buffalo. The potash mine of Colonsay was first named Noranda Mines Potash Division then separately constituted as Central Canada Potash. Central Canada Potash was acquired by Imc. Potash Corporation of Saskatchewan, Colonsay, IMC Potash Colonsay and is now Mosaic Potash Colonsay. Potash is mined and sold to crop nutrient manufacturers for fertilizer, as well as for use as an icemelter ingredient and water softener regenerant.

== Sports ==
Colonsay & District Sports Centre was re-opened in 2006 following fund raising efforts by the community as well as funding initiatives such as the Green Municipal Investment Fund, a joint venture of the Government of Canada and the Federation of Canadian Municipalities. The Sports Centre has a new heating system as well as ice-cube heat which will allow a longer artificial ice season for skaters, curlers and ice hockey players. The Sports Centre was closed in 2004 due to safety concerns with the refrigeration system. The original ice plant was improperly installed and designed. the complex was built in 1978.

The Colonsay Monarchs were a team that played for the Northern Saskatchewan Baseball League as of 1951.

== See also ==
- List of communities in Saskatchewan
- List of towns in Saskatchewan
