= Rural Municipality of Colonsay No. 342 =

Rural municipality in Saskatchewan, Canada

Colonsay No. 342
- Rural municipality
- Rural Municipality of Colonsay No. 342

- Location of the RM of Colonsay No. 342 in Saskatchewan
- Coordinates: 52.019°N 105.909°W
- Country: Canada
- Province: Saskatchewan
- Census division: 11
- SARM division: 5
- Formed: December 13, 1909

Government
  - Reeve: Gerald Yausie
  - Governing body: RM of Colonsay No. 342 Council
  - Administrator: Randi Wood
  - Office location: Colonsay

Area (2016)
  - Land: 549.99 km^{2} (212.35 sq mi)

Population (2016)
  - Total: 269
  - Density: 0.5/km^{2} (1.3/sq mi)
- Time zone: CST
  - Summer (DST): CST
- Area codes: 306 and 639

The Rural Municipality of Colonsay No. 342 (2016 population: 269) is a rural municipality (RM) in the Canadian province of Saskatchewan within Census Division No. 11 and SARM Division No. 5. it is located east of the City of Saskatoon.

== History ==
The RM of Colonsay No. 342 incorporated as a rural municipality on December 13, 1909.

== Geography ==
=== Communities and localities ===
The following urban municipalities are surrounded by the RM.

Villages

- Colonsay
- Meacham

The following unincorporated communities are within the RM.

Localities

- Arpiers
- Neely
- Rutan

== Demographics ==
Population history (1981–2016)
Year	Pop.	±%
1981	414	—
1986	398	−3.9%
1991	357	−10.3%
1996	322	−9.8%
2001	310	−3.7%
2006	275	−11.3%
2011	240	−12.7%
2016	269	+12.1%
Source: Statistics Canada via Saskatchewan Bureau of Statistics

In the 2021 Census of Population conducted by Statistics Canada, the RM of Colonsay No. 342 had a population of 260 living in 101 of its 112 total private dwellings, a change of −3.3% from its 2016 population of 269. With a land area of 548.46 km^{2} (211.76 sq mi), it had a population density of 0.5/km^{2} (1.2/sq mi) in 2021.

In the 2016 Census of Population, the RM of Colonsay No. 342 recorded a population of 269 living in 107 of its 121 total private dwellings, a 12.1% change from its 2011 population of 240. With a land area of 549.99 km^{2} (212.35 sq mi), it had a population density of 0.5/km^{2} (1.3/sq mi) in 2016.

== Government ==
The RM of Colonsay No. 342 is governed by an elected municipal council and an appointed administrator that meets on the second Wednesday of every month. The reeve of the RM is Gerald Yausie while its administrator is Randi Wood. The RM's office is located in Colonsay.
