= Lisieux, Saskatchewan =

Community in Saskatchewan, Canada

Coordinates: 49°16′46″N 105°58′32″W

Location of Lisieux in Saskatchewan

Lisieux is an unincorporated community in the Rural Municipality of Willow Bunch No. 42, Saskatchewan, Canada. It was designated as an organized hamlet prior to 2018.

== History ==
The place was originally named Joeville, after Joseph-Hermenegilde Préfontaine, an early homesteader. It was given its present name in 1926 to honour the recently canonized Saint Thérèse of Lisieux. There was a post office at Lisieux from 1921 to 1991. Lisieux relinquished its organized hamlet designation on December 31, 2017.

== Demographics ==
In the 2021 Census of Population conducted by Statistics Canada, Lisieux had a population of 10 living in 6 of its 9 total private dwellings, a change of 0% from its 2016 population of 10. With a land area of 0.21 km^{2} (0.081 sq mi), it had a population density of 47.6/km^{2} (123.3/sq mi) in 2021.

== See also ==
- List of communities in Saskatchewan
