= Assiniboia, Saskatchewan =

Town in Saskatchewan, Canada

Assiniboia
- Town
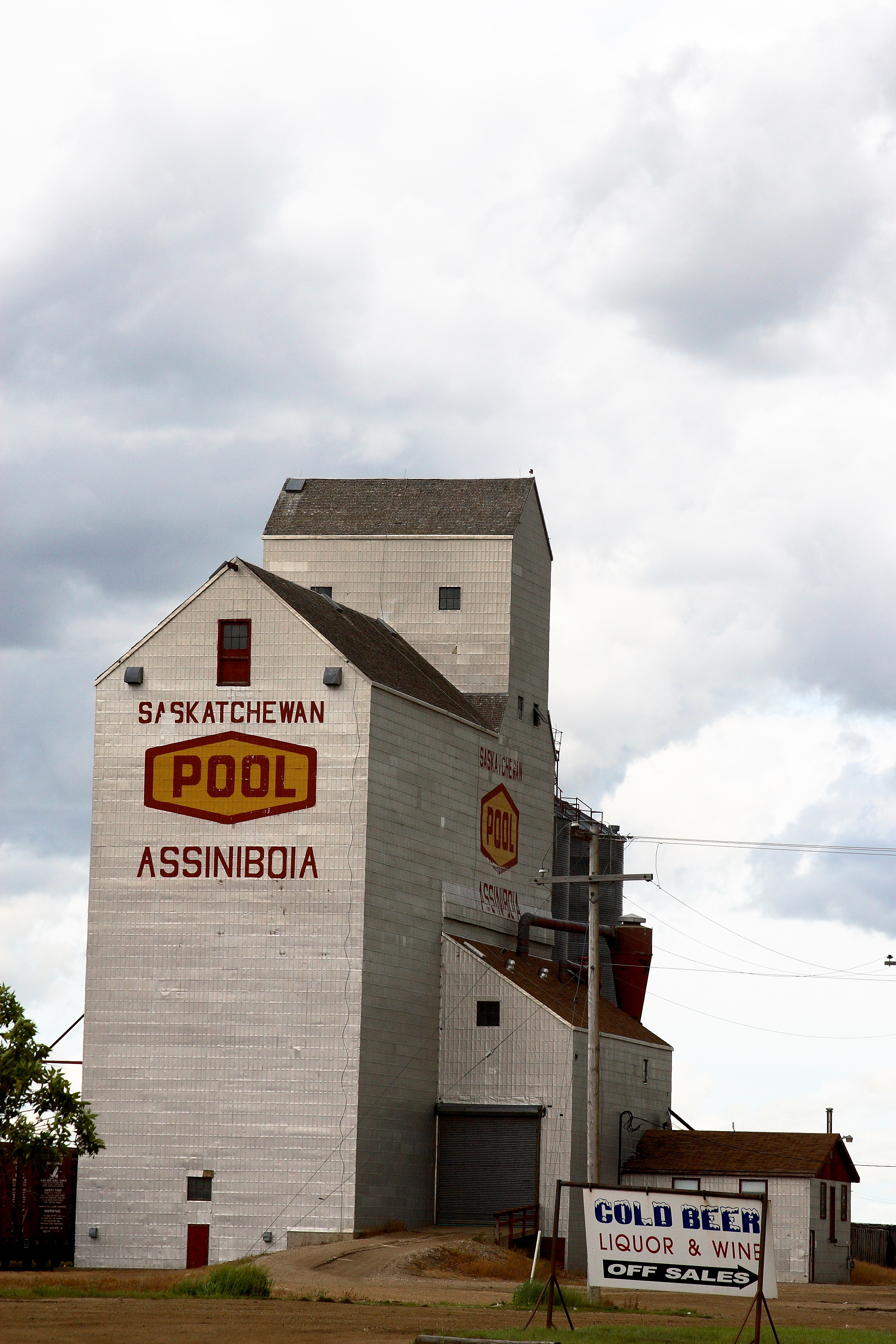
- Assiniboia Grain Elevator

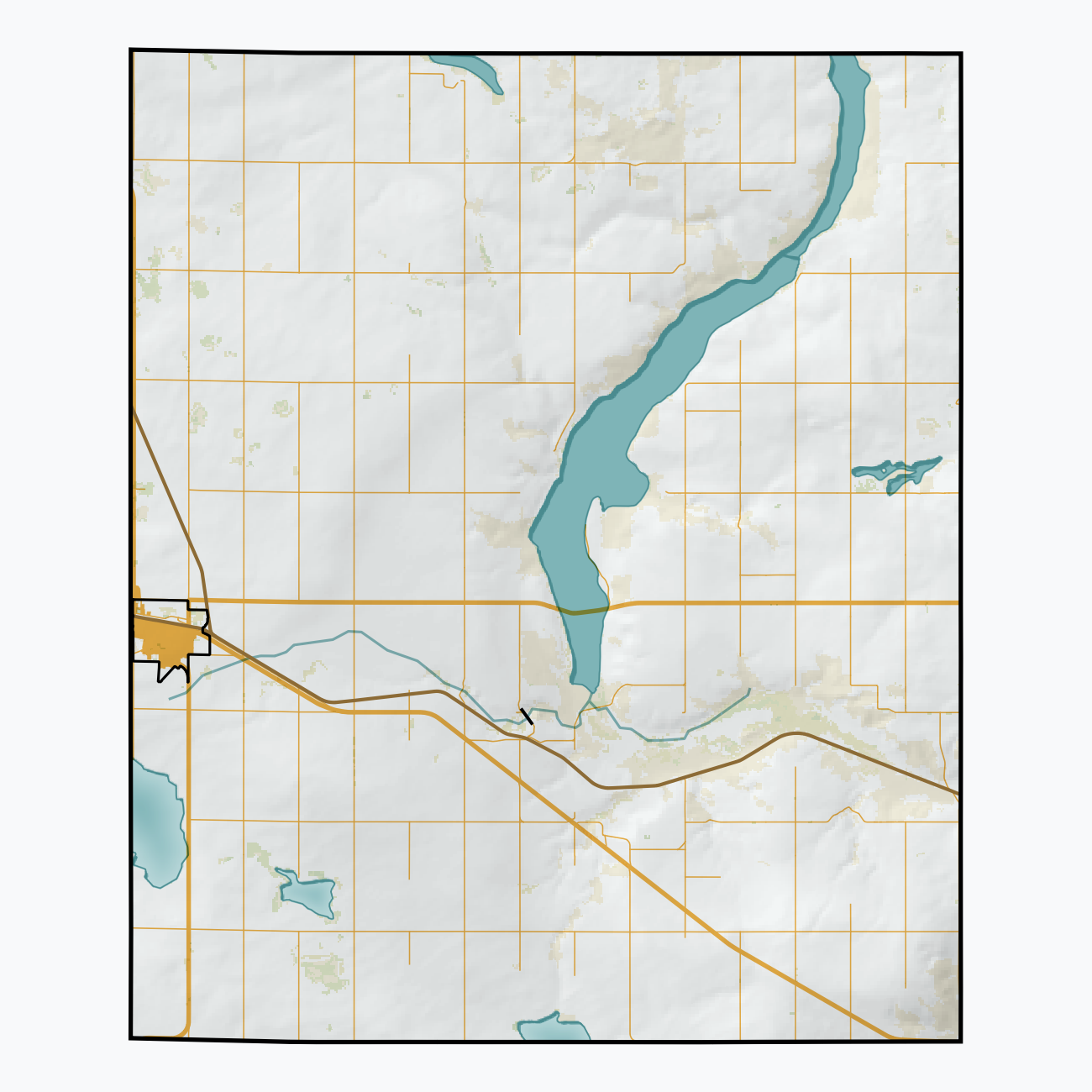
- Location of Assiniboia Assiniboia (Saskatchewan)
- Coordinates: 49.6328°N 105.9921°W
- Country: Canada
- Province: Saskatchewan
- Federal Electoral District: Cypress Hills-Grasslands
- Provincial Constituency: Wood River
- Village: 22 December 1912
- Town: 1913

Government
  - Mayor: Sharon Schauenberg
  - MLA: Dave Marit
  - MP: Jeremy Patzer

Area
  - Land: 3.79 km^{2} (1.46 sq mi)

Population (2016)
  - Total: 2,389
  - Density: 243.4/km^{2} (630.3/sq mi)
- Demonym: Assiniboian
- Time zone: UTC−06:00 (CST)
- Website: Town of Assiniboia

Assiniboia is a town in the Canadian province of Saskatchewan. It is about 110 kilometres (68 mi) south-southwest of Moose Jaw beside Highway 2 and Highway 13.

== History ==
The Dominion Land Survey's description of the area around Assiniboia is Sec.18, Twp.8, R.29, W2. It was first settled by people of English, French, Romanian, Scottish, and Scandinavian descent. From 30 March 1908 to 23 November 1912, the post office at this location was named Leeville, Saskatchewan.

The settlement of Assiniboia originated on 12 October 1912, when the Canadian Pacific Railway put 980 lots up for sale at the townsite as it built a branch line through southern Saskatchewan. The community grew rapidly and on 22 December 1912, it was incorporated as a village. In 1913, the population rose from 400 to 1,400, and the community was incorporated as a town. The town's name comes from the former district of Assiniboia, in which the town is located.

During the Great Depression, town officials employed out-of-work men to construct the Assiniboia sewer system. Unfortunately, the town could not afford to operate it until 1948.

The RCAF Station Assiniboia World War II airfield, (now operated as the Assiniboia Airport) is located 6 nautical miles (11 km; 6.9 mi) north of Assiniboia. It was used for elementary flight school training during the World War II years of 1942-1944.

== Assiniboia Regional Park ==
Assiniboia Regional Park (49.6263°N 105.9905°W) is a regional park that was founded in 1977 and is operated from three locations around the town. There's a 9-hole golf course south-east of town, Willows Dam east of town, and Centennial Park in town.

The Centennial Park location has a campground with 17 campsites and modern showers and washrooms. Some of the other amenities at the park include an outdoor pool, picnic area, playground, potable water, tennis courts, sani-dump, and ball diamonds.

About 8 kilometres (5.0 mi) east along Highway 13 is Willows Dam, also known as Willows Reservoir. The reservoir has a boat launch for fishing and commonly caught fish include walleye and perch. No motorised boats are allowed on the lake.

The Assiniboia Regional Park Golf Course is a 9-hole golf course located 3.2 kilometres (2.0 mi) south of the campground that features grass greens, par 36 with blue tees totalling 2,768 yards and red tees totalling 2,548 yards. There is also a licensed club house with food and a pro shop.

== Demographics ==
In the 2021 Census of Population conducted by Statistics Canada, Assiniboia had a population of 2,333 living in 1,070 of its 1,236 total private dwellings, a change of −3.8% from its 2016 population of 2,424. With a land area of 3.68 km^{2} (1.42 sq mi), it had a population density of 634.0/km^{2} (1,642.0/sq mi) in 2021.

Canada census – Assiniboia community profile

| | 2021 | 2016 | 2011 |
| Population | 2,333 (-3.8% from 2016) | 2,389 (-1.2% from 2011) | 2,418 (4.9% from 2006) |
| Land area | 3.68 km^{2} (1.42 sq mi) | 3.79 km^{2} (1.46 sq mi) | 3.78 km^{2} (1.46 sq mi) |
| Population density | 633.6/km^{2} (1,641/sq mi) | 630.3/km^{2} (1,632/sq mi) | 639.8/km^{2} (1,657/sq mi) |
| Median age | 51.2 (M: 45.6, F: 55.2) | | 50.8 (M: 47.8, F: 54.3) |
| Private dwellings | 1,236 (total) 1,070 (occupied) | 1,210 (total) | 1,241 (total) |
| Median household income | $71,000 |

References: 2021 2016 2011

== Climate ==
Assiniboia has a humid continental climate (Dfb).

Climate data for Assiniboia Airport, 1981–2010 normals, extremes 1915–present
| Month | Jan | Feb | Mar | Apr | May | Jun | Jul | Aug | Sep | Oct | Nov | Dec | Year |
|---|---|---|---|---|---|---|---|---|---|---|---|---|---|
| Record high °C (°F) | 11.2 (52.2) | 18.0 (64.4) | 22.3 (72.1) | 32.0 (89.6) | 37.0 (98.6) | 40.5 (104.9) | 42.8 (109.0) | 40.0 (104.0) | 37.5 (99.5) | 33.5 (92.3) | 24.7 (76.5) | 12.9 (55.2) | 42.8 (109.0) |
| Mean daily maximum °C (°F) | −6.4 (20.5) | −3.4 (25.9) | 2.2 (36.0) | 11.8 (53.2) | 18.0 (64.4) | 22.3 (72.1) | 26.3 (79.3) | 26.1 (79.0) | 19.4 (66.9) | 11.6 (52.9) | 1.5 (34.7) | −4.4 (24.1) | 10.5 (50.9) |
| Daily mean °C (°F) | −11.8 (10.8) | −8.6 (16.5) | −3.2 (26.2) | 5.1 (41.2) | 11.0 (51.8) | 15.8 (60.4) | 18.9 (66.0) | 18.3 (64.9) | 12.1 (53.8) | 5.1 (41.2) | −3.8 (25.2) | −9.7 (14.5) | 4.2 (39.6) |
| Mean daily minimum °C (°F) | −17.2 (1.0) | −13.9 (7.0) | −8.6 (16.5) | −1.7 (28.9) | 3.9 (39.0) | 9.3 (48.7) | 11.5 (52.7) | 10.5 (50.9) | 4.8 (40.6) | −1.5 (29.3) | −9.1 (15.6) | −15.0 (5.0) | −2.2 (28.0) |
| Record low °C (°F) | −43.9 (−47.0) | −40.6 (−41.1) | −36.6 (−33.9) | −30.0 (−22.0) | −12.8 (9.0) | −4.4 (24.1) | 0.8 (33.4) | −2.8 (27.0) | −13.3 (8.1) | −23.9 (−11.0) | −33.0 (−27.4) | −43.5 (−46.3) | −43.9 (−47.0) |
| Average precipitation mm (inches) | 16.1 (0.63) | 9.3 (0.37) | 15.1 (0.59) | 21.0 (0.83) | 51.1 (2.01) | 75.9 (2.99) | 60.1 (2.37) | 36.2 (1.43) | 34.0 (1.34) | 20.1 (0.79) | 15.1 (0.59) | 14.8 (0.58) | 374.6 (14.75) |
Source: Environment Canada

== Education ==
- Seventh Avenue School (kindergarten - grade 4)
- Assiniboia Elementary School (grades 5 - 8)
- Assiniboia Composite High School (grades 9 - 12)
- Southeast Regional College - Assiniboia Campus (post-secondary)

== See also ==
- List of towns in Saskatchewan
- List of francophone communities in Saskatchewan
- List of communities in Saskatchewan
