= Congress, Saskatchewan =

Hamlet in Saskatchewan, Canada

Coordinates: 49°45′15″N 106°01′15″W

Congress is an unincorporated community in Saskatchewan, Canada within the Rural Municipality of Stonehenge No. 73. It held organized hamlet status prior to 2025.

== History ==
The community's organized hamlet status was reverted on January 1, 2025.

== Demographics ==
In the 2021 Census of Population conducted by Statistics Canada, Congress had a population of 20 living in 9 of its 10 total private dwellings, a change of 0% from its 2016 population of 20. With a land area of 0.99 km^{2} (0.38 sq mi), it had a population density of 20.2/km^{2} (52.3/sq mi) in 2021.
