= Spruce Home =

Community in Saskatchewan, Canada

- Community
- Location within Saskatchewan Location within Canada
- Coordinates: 53°24′N 105°46′W
- Country: Canada
- Province: Saskatchewan
- Time zone: UTC-6 (CST)
- Postal code: SOJ 2N0
- Area code: 306
- Highways: CanAm Highway / Highway 2 / Highway 355

Spruce Home is a small farming community north of Saskatchewan's third largest city, Prince Albert. The community is located at the junction between Highway 2 (CanAm Highway) and Highway 355. The first post office opened in 1908 at Sec.32, Twp.50, R.26, W2 surviving in this location for 9 years. This unincorporated area had post offices come and go over the years.

== Education ==
Spruce Home has an elementary school which is a part of the Saskatchewan Rivers School Division.

Currently the school has about 138 students.

== See also ==
- List of communities in Saskatchewan
