= CanAm Highway =

Highway in the United States and Saskatchewan

CanAm Highway
- CanAm Highway highlighted in red

Route information
- Length: 3,178.9 km (1,975.3 mi) 2,379 km (1,478 mi) in U.S., 800.3 km (497.3 mi) in Canada
- Component highways: I-25 / US 85; Highway 35; Highway 39; Highway 6; Highway 3; Highway 2; Highway 102

Major junctions
- South end: Fed. 45 at El Paso, TX
- North end: Southend, SK

Location
- Country: United States
- States: Texas, New Mexico, Colorado, Wyoming, South Dakota, North Dakota, Saskatchewan

Highway system
- United States Numbered Highway System; List; Special; Divided
- Provincial highways in Saskatchewan

The CanAm Highway is an international highway that connects Mexico to Canada through the United States. It travels along U.S. Route 85 (US 85) and Interstate 25 (I-25), passing through six U.S. states (Texas, New Mexico, Colorado, Wyoming, South Dakota, North Dakota) and the Canadian province of Saskatchewan. The CanAm highway in Canada comprises Saskatchewan Highway 35 (SK 35), SK 39, SK 6, SK 3, SK 2, and SK 102. The route continues south in Mexico as Mexican Federal Highway 45 (Fed. 45) but is not labeled the CanAm highway.

== History ==
The CanAm highway was a concept begun in the 1920s.

== Route description ==
The CanAm Highway follows US 85 from El Paso, Texas, for 2,379 kilometres (1,478 mi) to the border between the United States and Canada. It continues north on SK 35 to Weyburn, Saskatchewan, where it switches to SK 39. Then it runs north to Corinne where it continues on SK 6 until Melfort. There it changes highways again, this time to follow SK 3. That carries the CanAm Highway to Prince Albert where it continues on SK 2. At La Ronge, SK 2 becomes SK 102, where it continues to Southend, located at the southern end of Reindeer Lake. The portion of the highway within Canada is 1,021.2 kilometres (634.5 mi); the total length is 3,399.8 kilometres (2,112.5 mi).

== See also ==
- CANAMEX Corridor
- Pan-American Highway
- NAFTA superhighway
