= Saskatchewan Highway 3 =

Provincial highway in Saskatchewan, Canada

Highway 3
- CanAm Highway (segment)
- Highway 3 highlighted in red

Route information
- Maintained by Ministry of Highways and Infrastructure
- Length: 612.0 km (380.3 mi)

Major junctions
- West end: Highway 45 at Alberta border near Lloydminster
- Highway 17 near Lloydminster; Highway 21 at Paradise Hill; Highway 4 at Glaslyn; Highway 24 at Spiritwood; Highway 40 near Shellbrook; Highway 55 from Shellbrook to Prince Albert; Highway 2 / CanAm Highway in Prince Albert; Highway 20 near Birch Hills; Highway 6 / Highway 41 / CanAm Highway in Melfort; Highway 35 at Tisdale; Highway 9 at Hudson Bay
- East end: PTH 77 at Manitoba border near Armit

Location
- Country: Canada
- Province: Saskatchewan
- Rural municipalities: Brittania No. 502, Frenchman Butte No. 501, Mervin No. 499, Parkdale No. 498, Medstead No. 497, Spiritwood No. 496, Canwood No. 494, Shellbrook No. 493, Buckland No. 491, Prince Albert No. 461, Birch Hills No. 460, Birch Hills No. 459 Flett's Springs No. 429, Star City No. 428, Tisdale No. 427, Bjorkdale No. 426, Porcupine No. 396, Hudson Bay No. 94
- Major cities: Prince Albert, Melfort

Highway system
- Provincial highways in Saskatchewan
← Highway 2	→ Highway 4

Highway 3 is a major east–west provincial highway in Saskatchewan, Canada. It runs from the Alberta border, where it continues west as Alberta Highway 45, to the Manitoba border, and then continues east as Highway 77. Major communities along the route include Prince Albert, Melfort, and Tisdale. Highway 3 is about 615 kilometres (382 mi) long, the majority of which is two lanes.

A 96.1-kilometre (59.7 mi) long section of Highway 3 between Melfort and Prince Albert is part of the international CanAm Highway and a 43-kilometre (27 mi) long section between Shellbrook and Prince Albert is part of the interprovincial Northern Woods and Water Route.

== Route description ==
Highway 3 runs from the north–south Highway 17 on Saskatchewan's border with Alberta east across the province to Manitoba. In Alberta, the highway continues west as Highway 45. In Manitoba, it continues east as Highway 77. Other than four-lane sections from the Sturgeon River east to Prince Albert, through Prince Albert itself, and a short run through Melfort, Highway 3 is two lanes.

The highway crosses the North Saskatchewan River (twice) and South Saskatchewan River. It also traverses the Meadow Lake Escarpment in the west and the Manitoba Escarpment in the east. For most of its length, it runs through the transition zone between boreal forest and aspen parkland.

=== Alberta border to Prince Albert ===
Beginning at the border, Highway 3 travels east for about 26 kilometres (16 mi) to the North Saskatchewan River. En route to the river, the highway passes the Fort Pitt Trail marker and intersects Highway 684. It then crosses the North Saskatchewan River via the Deer Creek Bridge. Continuing east, the highway intersects Highway 797 (which leads to Fort Pitt Provincial Park and Battle of Frenchman's Butte national historic site), crosses the Monnery River, provides access to the village of Paradise Hill, and intersects Highway 21. At the entrance to Paradise Hill, there is the Giant Ox & Cart, which commemorates the historic Carlton Trail that ran through the area. Highway 21 leads north to the Bronson Forest Recreation Site. Highway 3 and 21 then begin a 10.1-kilometre (6.3 mi) long eastbound concurrency. At the end of the concurrency, 21 turns south and 3 turns to the north-east. After travelling a further 7.3 kilometres (4.5 mi), Highway 3 comes to a stop sign at the intersection with Highway 26. A short distance north on 26 is the town of St. Walburg. Highways 3 and 26 then begin a 29-kilometre (18 mi) long concurrency that heads south-east. Along this concurrency are the communities of Spruce Lake and Cleeves. There is also an intersection with Highway 796. The concurrency ends just after the highway crosses the Turtlelake River on the north side of the town of Turtleford. Turtleford is home to the roadside attraction Ernie the Turtle, which is the "largest and friendliest turtle" in Canada. Highway 26 continues into Turtleford while 3 turns north and follows the Turtlelake River for almost 4 kilometres (2.5 mi). It then turns east and heads for Fairholme. Along the way, it goes through a coulee and intersects Highway 795 (which leads to Livelong and the communities around Turtle Lake) and Highway 697. At Fairholme, Highway 3 turns to the south-east, provides access to East Anglia, and meets the north–south Highway 4 just north of Glaslyn. Highways 3 and 4 have a 1.6-kilometre (1 mi) long concurrency that runs alongside Glaslyn. At the end of the concurrency, Highway 4 continues south while 3 resumes its easterly heading.

Heading east from Glaslyn, Highway 3 travels for 55 kilometres (34 mi) en route to Spiritwood. Just east of Glaslyn, the highway provides access to Little Loon Regional Park. As it nears Spiritwood, it passes through Belbutte, intersects Highway 696, and passes just south of Witchekan Lake. Highway 3 then runs along the northern edge of Spiritwood where it intersects Highway 24 at its southern terminus and Highway 378 at its northern terminus.

Heading east from Spiritwood, Highway 3 travels through rolling hills, farmland, and forest through a landscape marked by potholes. It provides access to Mildred, Amiens, Shell Lake, and Memorial Lake Regional Park. At Shell Lake, it intersects Highway 695 and Highway 12. It then crosses the Shell River and rounds the southern shore of Memorial Lake. The highway then continues east to Mont Nebo and Shellbrook. About 3.2 kilometres (2 mi) west of Shellbrook, Highway 3 intersects the northern terminus of Highway 40. Highway 3 runs along the northern edge of Shellbrook where it meets, and then begins, a roughly 43-kilometre (27 mi) long eastbound concurrency with Highway 55 that ends in Prince Albert. From Shellbrook to Prince Albert, the highway approaches the North Saskatchewan River, crosses the Sturgeon River via the Shell River Bridge, and provides access to the communities of Holbein and Crutwell. From the Shell River Bridge east to Prince Albert, Highway 3 is four lanes. This concurrency with Highway 55 is part of the Northern Woods and Water Route.

=== Prince Albert ===
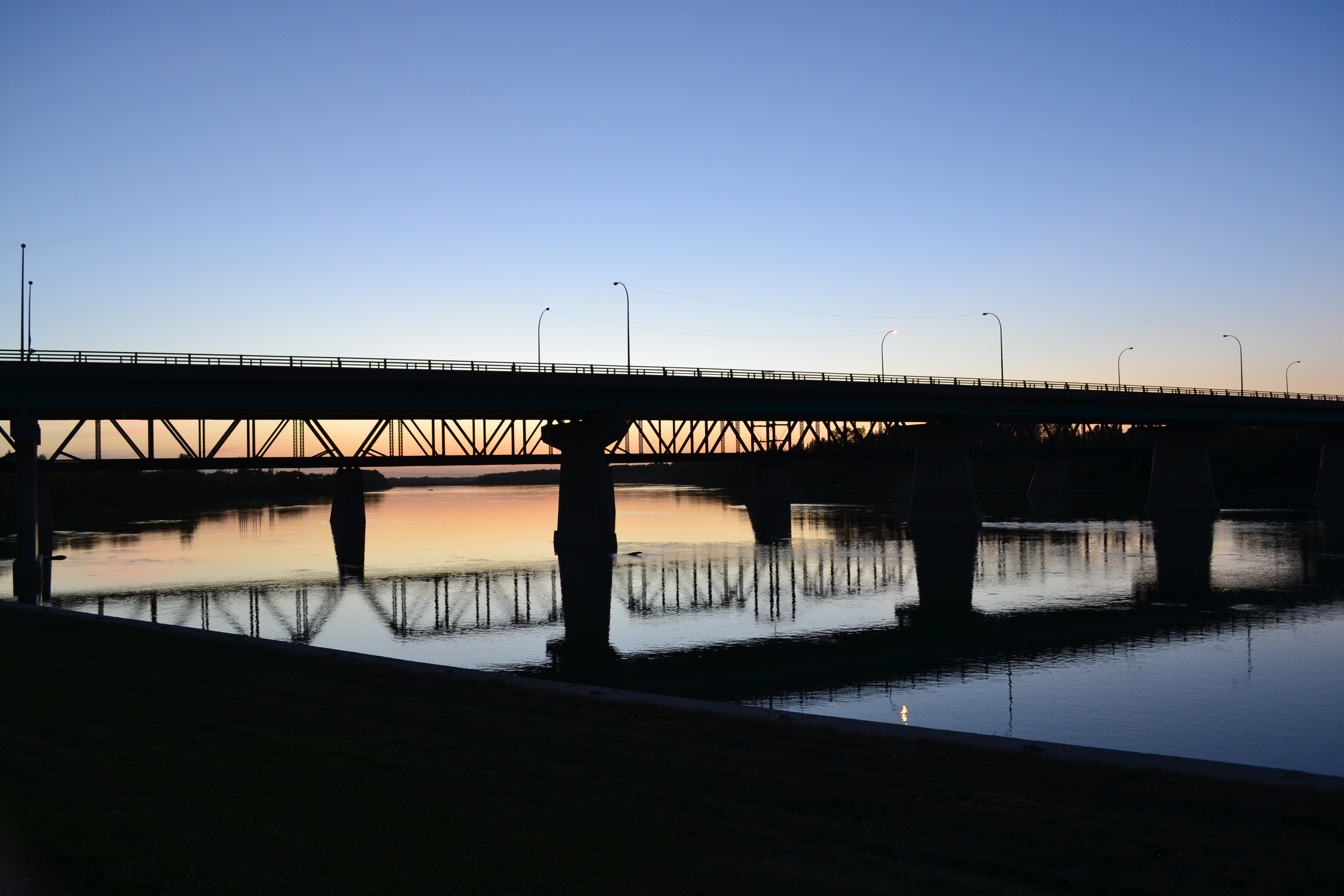
Diefenbaker Bridge over the North Saskatchewan River in Prince Albert

Highway 3 approaches the city of Prince Albert from the north side of the North Saskatchewan River. It meets the north–south Highway 2 at an interchange where they begin a southbound concurrency across the river via the Diefenbaker Bridge and into the city. The CanAm Highway portion of Highway 3 begins at the intersection with Highway 2 and continues for 96.1 kilometres (59.7 mi) until the city of Melfort.

Once across the river, the highway becomes 2nd Avenue West. On the east side of the highway, is the Mann Art Gallery and Gateway Mall. Less than 500 metres (1,600 ft) across the river, Highway 3 turns east onto 15th Street East (which is also Highway 302). Highway 2 continues south along 2nd Avenue West. Highway 3 travels east for about 1.5 kilometres (0.93 mi) to 6th Avenue East. On the north side of the highway is downtown and to the south are the railyards. Once Highway 3 reaches 6th Avenue East, it turns south. It passes through residential, commercial, and light industrial for about 2.5 kilometres (1.6 mi). After which, the highway gradually bends to the south-east and leaves the city.

=== Prince Albert to Melfort ===
Highway 3 leaves Prince Albert at the city's southern end and heads south-east past Fairview Fairways towards Davis. The highway then enters the Muskoday Indian reserve and crosses the South Saskatchewan River via the Muskoday Bridge. On the east side of the river, it intersects Highway 789 and turns south-east. Leaving the reserve, the highway turns south towards the town of Birch Hills. As the highway approaches the town, it turns east and intersects the northern terminus of Highway 25. A further 2.8 kilometres (1.7 mi) past Highway 25 junction, Highway 3 meets the northern terminus of Highway 20. Continuing east, the highway passes by the communities of Brancepeth and Weldon. Weldon is accessed from Highway 682. A short distance from Highway 682, Highway 3 turns to the south-east where about 6.5 kilometres (4.0 mi) later, it enters the town of Kinistino and intersects Highway 778 in the Carrot River valley. The highway then heads east-southeast for about 29 kilometres (18 mi) to Highway 6 in the city of Melfort. Along the way, it intersects Highway 368 at Beatty.

Highway 3 enters the city of Melfort as Saskatchewan Drive West. At Broadway Avenue, it intersects, and begins a 3.3-kilometre (2.1 mi) long concurrency with, the north–south Highway 6. The highway continues as Saskatchewan Drive West until Main Street, at which point it becomes Saskatchewan Drive East. At the intersection with Star City Road, the highway turns south past Melfort Golf and Country Club and follows Saskatchewan Drive South to the southern end of the city. At an intersection at the southern edge of Melfort, Highway 3 leaves the CanAm Highway and turns east. Highway 6 and the CanAm continue south. Westbound at this intersection is Highway 41.

=== Melfort to the Manitoba border ===
Highway 3 heads straight east from Melfort to Tisdale. En route, it intersects Highway 681 (access to Star City) and passes just south of Valparaiso. As the highway enters the south-west corner of Tisdale, it provides access to Tisdale Airport (via Heritage Road). It then skirts through the southern part of town as 93rd Avenue running through commercial and light industrial neighbourhoods and intersecting the north–south Highway 35. As the highway exits Tisdale, it crosses the Doghide River and runs past Kinsmen McKay Park. Highway 3 then continues east for a further 21 kilometres (13 mi) to Highway 23. Highways 3 and 23 then begin a northbound 3.3-kilometre (2.1 mi) long concurrency that crosses the Crooked River and runs past the village of Crooked River. At the end of the concurrency, 23 continues north while 3 resumes its easterly heading.

This final leg of Highway 3 takes it over the Manitoba Escarpment — which is a range of hills along the Saskatchewan–Manitoba border that was created by glacial scouring and formed the western shore of prehistoric Lake Agassiz — to the town of Hudson Bay. To the north of Highway 3 are the Pasquia Hills and to the south are the Porcupine Hills. The highway also follows the Red Deer River for part of its journey through the hills. Communities along this stretch include Peesane, Orley, Mistatim, Prairie River, Silas, Veillardville, Mutchler, and Hudson Bay. Intersecting highways include 678, 677, and 9.

Highway 3 enters the town of Hudson Bay from the west. Hudson Bay is the site of an historic trading post. Hudson Bay Regional Park, at the south end of town, commemorates the history of the area. Highway 3 meets Highway 9, the Saskota Flyway, on the western side of town. At that point, the two highways begin a 3.3-kilometre (2.1 mi) long concurrency that at first heads north then east. At the point where the highway turns east is the Hudson Bay train station, which is a flag stop along the Winnipeg–Churchill route. Heading east, the highway runs as Railway Avenue with the railway to the north and residential and commercial neighbourhoods to the south. At Albert Street, Highway 9 turns north leaving the concurrency while 3 continues east towards Manitoba.

About 13 kilometres (8.1 mi) east of Hudson Bay, Highway 3 crosses the Red Deer River and enters the community of Erwood. Erwood, like Hudson Bay, is the site of an historic fur trading post. Continuing east, Highway 3 intersects Highway 981 and runs through the community of Smoking Tent. Next, the highway intersects Highway 980 at Armit. About 6.8 kilometres (4.2 mi) east of Armit, Highway 3 crosses the Armit River. A further 500 metres (1,600 ft) later, Highway crosses into Manitoba and becomes Highway 77. Westgate, Manitoba is less than a mile east across the border.

== CanAm Highway ==
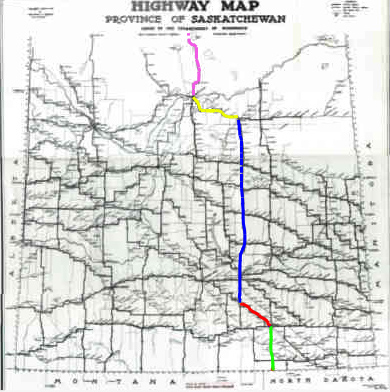
CanAm Highway Legend through Saskatchewan: Sk 35 — green Sk 39 — red Sk 6 — blue Sk 3 — yellow Sk 2 — pink

The North American Free Trade Agreement (NAFTA) super corridor CanAm Highway travels along U.S. Route 85 connecting Mexico to Canada. The CanAm Highway in Canada comprises Saskatchewan Highways 35, 39, 6, 3, and 2. The total length of the CanAm Highway is 4,122 kilometres (2,561 mi), of which Highway 3 contributes 157.4 kilometres (97.8 mi). The route designated as CanAm in the 1920s continues south into Mexico as Federal Highway 45, and north as Saskatchewan's Highway 102 but are not labelled the CanAm Highway.

== Maintenance and upgrades ==
- In 2008, Highway 3 underwent 5 kilometres (3.1 mi) of micro-surfacing from Mistatim eastward.
- In 2021, six new passing lanes between Shellbrook and the Shell River Bridge over the Sturgeon River were added at a cost of $9.1 million.
- In 2024, 7.5 kilometres (4.7 mi) of Highway 3 were four-laned between the Shell River Bridge and Prince Albert at a cost of $21.4 million.
- In 2026, a new bridge at a cost of $2.7 million was constructed across the Prairie River, south of the community of Prairie River. Previously, there was a culvert there; it had washed out in August 2025.
- In 2026, repairs to the bridge over the Red Deer River near Erwood were completed at a cost of $400,000.

== Major intersections ==
From west to east:

Rural municipality	Location	km	mi	Destinations	Notes
Brittania No. 502		0.0	0.0	Highway 45 west – Marwayne Highway 17 – Onion Lake, Lloydminster	Continues as Highway 45 into Alberta
Brittania No. 502		24.4	15.2	Highway 684 south – Waseca	
↑ / ↓		26.2	16.3	Crosses the North Saskatchewan River via the Deer Creek Bridge	
Frenchman Butte No. 501		28.2	17.5	Highway 797 north – Frenchman Butte	
Frenchman Butte No. 501	Paradise Hill	38.9	24.2	Highway 21 north – Pierceland	West end of Highway 21 concurrency
Frenchman Butte No. 501		49.0	30.4	Highway 21 south – Maidstone	East end of Highway 21 concurrency
Frenchman Butte No. 501		56.3	35.0	Highway 26 north – St. Walburg, Loon Lake	West end of Highway 26 concurrency
Mervin No. 499	Spruce Lake	66.5	41.3	Highway 796 east	
Mervin No. 499	Turtleford	85.4	53.1	Highway 26 south – The Battlefords	East end of Highway 26 concurrency
Mervin No. 499		105.3	65.4	Turtle Lake Access Road (Range Road 3192) – Livelong, Turtle Lake (West Side)	To Highway 795 north
Parkdale No. 498		111.8	69.5	Highway 697 north – Turtle Lake (East Side)	
Parkdale No. 498	Fairholme	115.0	71.5	Monument Road	Former Highway 697 south
Parkdale No. 498	Glaslyn	131.7	81.8	Highway 4 north – Meadow Lake	West end of Highway 4 concurrency
Parkdale No. 498	Glaslyn	132.0	82.0	Highway 4 south – The Battlefords	East end of Highway 4 concurrency
Medstead No. 497		150.2	93.3	Highway 794 south – Medstead	
Spiritwood No. 496		175.1	108.8	Highway 696 north	
Spiritwood No. 496	Spiritwood	187.4	116.4	Highway 24 north – Leoville, Chitek Lake	
Spiritwood No. 496	Spiritwood	187.7	116.6	Highway 378 south – Rabbit Lake, The Battlefords	
Spiritwood No. 496		217.6	135.2	Highway 695 north	
Spiritwood No. 496	Shell Lake	219.2	136.2	Highway 12 south – Blaine Lake, Saskatoon	
Canwood No. 494		253.5	157.5	Highway 694 north – Canwood	South of Ordale
Shellbrook No. 493		264.9	164.6	Highway 40 west – The Battlefords, Saskatoon	
Shellbrook No. 493	Shellbrook	268.6	166.9	Highway 55 west (NWRR) – Meadow Lake	West end of Highway 55 concurrency
Shellbrook No. 493	Holbein	281.3	174.8	Highway 693 north – Sturgeon Valley	
Buckland No. 491	No major junctions				
City of Prince Albert		310.8	193.1	Highway 2 / CanAm Highway north – Prince Albert National Park, La Ronge Highway 55 east (NWRR) – Nipawin	Interchange; CanAm Highway west end; east end of Highway 55 concurrency; west end of Highway 2 concurrency
City of Prince Albert		311.6	193.6	Riverside Drive east to Highway 55 – Nipawin	Interchange, northbound entrance and exit; northbound access to Highway 55 east
City of Prince Albert		311.6– 312.0	193.6– 193.9	Diefenbaker Bridge across North Saskatchewan River	
City of Prince Albert		312.0	193.9	River Street	Grade separated; southbound exit only
City of Prince Albert		312.5	194.2	15th Street W (Highway 302 west) 2nd Avenue W (Highway 2 south) to Highway 11 – Moose Jaw, Saskatoon	Highway 3 follows 15th Street W; east end of Highway 2 concurrency; west end of Highway 302 concurrency
City of Prince Albert		314.0	195.1	15th Street E (Highway 302 east) / 6th Avenue E	Highway 3 follows 6th Avenue E; west end of Highway 302 concurrency
City of Prince Albert		316.1	196.4	Marquis Road	Alternate route to Highway 2 / Highway 11
Prince Albert No. 461	No major junctions				
↑ / ↓	Muskoday First Nation	336.0	208.8	Muskoday Bridge across South Saskatchewan River	
Birch Hills No. 460	Muskoday First Nation	337.6	209.8	Highway 789 west	
Birch Hills No. 460	Birch Hills	350.5	217.8	Highway 25 west – St. Louis	
Birch Hills No. 460		353.3	219.5	Highway 20 south – Humboldt	
Kinistino No. 459		367.8	228.5	Highway 682 north – Weldon, Weldon Ferry	West end of Highway 682 concurrency
Kinistino No. 459	Kinistino	377.3	234.4	Highway 778 west	West end of Highway 778 concurrency
Kinistino No. 459	Kinistino	377.8	234.8	Highway 778 east / Highway 682 south – Meskanaw	East end of Highway 682 / Highway 778 concurrency
Flett's Springs No. 429	Beatty	393.2	244.3	Highway 368 south – St. Brieux	
Flett's Springs No. 429		405.3	251.8	Highway 41A west to Highway 41 – Saskatoon	West end of Highway 41A concurrency
City of Melfort		407.0	252.9	Broadway Avenue (Highway 6 north) – Gronlid, Wapiti Valley Regional Park	West end of Highway 6 concurrency
City of Melfort		410.3	254.9	Highway 41 west – Saskatoon Highway 6 / CanAm Highway south – Regina Highway 41A ends	CanAm Highway east end; east end of Highway 6 / Highway 41A concurrency
Star City No. 428		428.2	266.1	Highway 681 – Star City	
Tisdale No. 427	Tisdale	446.9	277.7	Highway 35 – Nipawin, Wadena	
Bjorkdale No. 426	Crooked River	468.2	290.9	Highway 23 south – Porcupine Plain	West end of Highway 23 concurrency
Bjorkdale No. 426		471.5	293.0	Highway 23 north – Carrot River	East end of Highway 23 concurrency
Bjorkdale No. 426		503.6	312.9	Highway 678 south – Porcupine Plain	
Porcupine No. 395		521.4	324.0	Highway 677 south / Prairie River Access Road – Carragana	
Hudson Bay No. 394	Hudson Bay	562.1	349.3	Highway 9 south – Preeceville, Yorkton	West end of Highway 9 concurrency
Hudson Bay No. 394	Hudson Bay	565.7	351.5	Highway 9 north – The Pas	West end of Highway 9 concurrency
Hudson Bay No. 394	Armit	604.7	375.7	Highway 980 south – Elbow Lake, Arran	
Hudson Bay No. 394		612.0	380.3	PTH 77 east – Baden, Swan River	Continues into Manitoba
1.000 mi = 1.609 km; 1.000 km = 0.621 mi: Concurrency terminus; Incomplete access; Route transition

== See also ==
- Transportation in Saskatchewan
- Roads in Saskatchewan

Preceded by Highway 6	CanAm Highway; Hwy 3	Succeeded by Highway 2
