= Shellbrook =

Shellbrook may refer to:

- Shellbrook, Leicestershire, England
- Rural Municipality of Shellbrook No. 493, Saskatchewan, Canada
  - Shellbrook, Saskatchewan, Canada
- Shellbrook Airport
- Shell Brook, a river in Saskatchewan, Canada
