= Sturgeon River (Saskatchewan) =

River in Saskatchewan, Canada

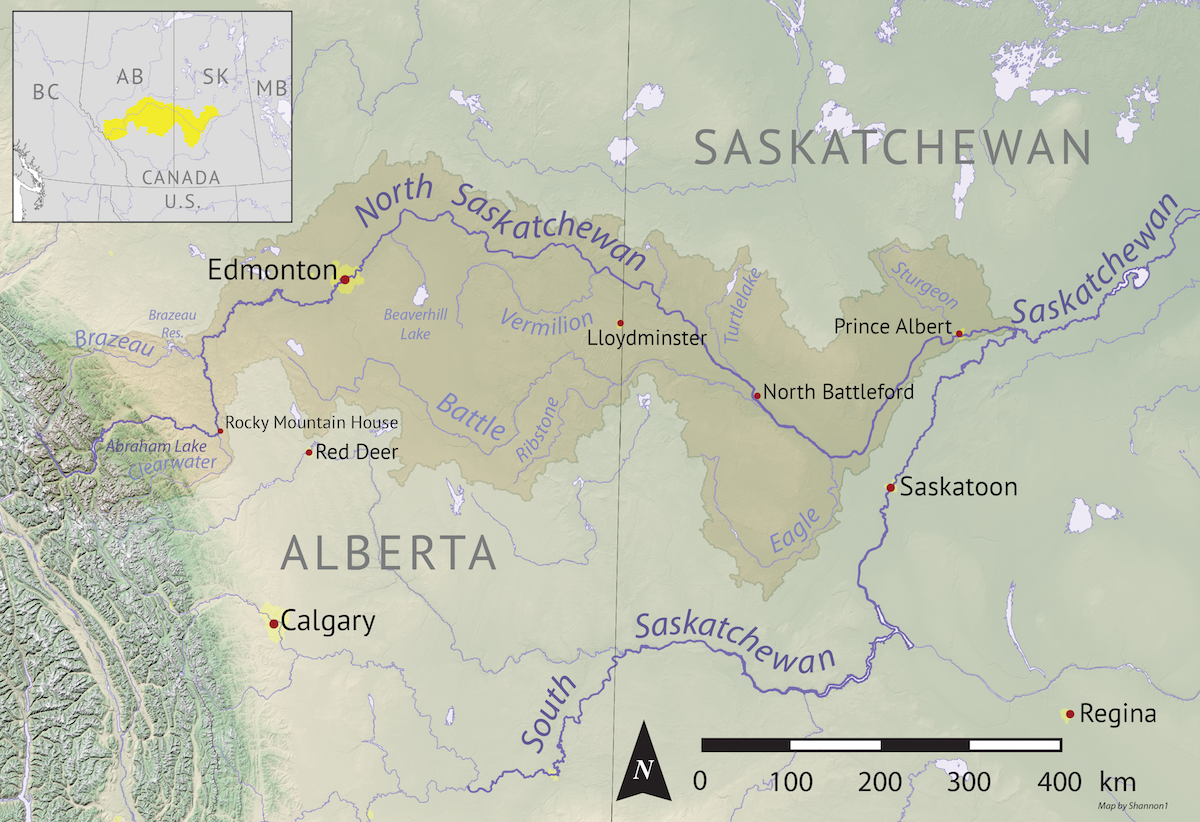

- Location of the mouth of the Sturgeon River in Saskatchewan Sturgeon River (Saskatchewan) (Canada)

Location
- Country: Canada
- Province: Saskatchewan

Physical characteristics
- Source: Antoine Lake
  - location: Prince Albert National Park
  - coordinates: 53.8177°N 106.4367°W
  - elevation: 728 m (2,388 ft)
- Mouth: North Saskatchewan River
  - location: RM of Buckland No. 491
  - coordinates: 53.2035°N 105.8637°W
  - elevation: 423 m (1,388 ft)
- Length: 140 km (87 mi)

Basin features
- River system: Hudson Bay drainage basin
- Tributaries
  - left: Lofthouse Brook; Rabbit Creek
  - right: Lost Creek; Shell River

Sturgeon River is a river in the Hudson Bay drainage basin in the central part of the Canadian province of Saskatchewan. It flows from its source in the Waskesiu Hills in Prince Albert National Park to the North Saskatchewan River, just west of the city of Prince Albert.

== Course ==
The Sturgeon River begins at a small lake named Antoine Lake in the Nimrod Hills range of the Waskesiu Hills in Prince Albert National Park. From the lake, the river heads west through muskeg, boreal forests, and glacier carved valleys to the western boundary of Prince Albert National Park, at which point it turns south following a glacial spillway that was formed at the end of the ice age. Sturgeon River continues south through the spillway forming the western boundary of the park and the eastern boundaries of the rural municipalities of Big River No. 555 and Canwood No. 494. The river carries on south through the RM of Shellbrook No. 493, Sturgeon Lake and Sturgeon Lake First Nation, and RM of Buckland No. 491 en route to the North Saskatchewan River. The river's mouth is west of Prince Albert at Peter Pond Point.

The North Saskatchewan River heads east from there and meets the South Saskatchewan River about 50 kilometres (31 mi) from Prince Albert at Saskatchewan River Forks to form the Saskatchewan River.

== Tributaries ==
The following are Sturgeon River's tributaries from the source in the Waskesiu Hills to the mouth at the North Saskatchewan River:

- Lost Creek begins at Erickson Lake and flows south-west.
- Crossman Creek begins at Crossman Lake and flows north-west.
- Lofthouse Brook begins at a small lake in the Nimrod Hills just south of Antoine Lake and north of the source of Spruce River and flows west.
- Fox Creek begins at Fox Lake and flows south-west to meet.
- Rabbit Creek begins at Spruce and Leroy Lakes and flows south-west.
  - Flat Creek
- Sugar Creek
- Shell River, formerly Shell Brook, begins at Shell Lake and flows east.
  - Mistowasis Creek
  - Tippicanoe Creek
  - Vant Creek
  - Sucker Creek

== Sturgeon River Recreation Site ==
Sturgeon River Recreation Site (53.2121°N 105.8854°W) is a provincial recreation site located along the banks of the Sturgeon River near its mouth at the west end of Prince Albert. The site has a fully serviced campground and a picnic area. Access is from Highway 3.

== See also ==
- List of rivers of Saskatchewan
- Tourism in Saskatchewan
