= Saskatchewan Highway 25 =

Provincial highway in Saskatchewan, Canada

Highway 25
- Highway 25 highlighted in red

Route information
- Maintained by Ministry of Highways and Infrastructure
- Length: 27.0 km (16.8 mi)

Major junctions
- West end: Highway 2 near St. Louis
- East end: Highway 3 / CanAm Highway near Birch Hills

Location
- Country: Canada
- Province: Saskatchewan
- Rural municipalities: St. Louis, Birch Hills

Highway system
- Provincial highways in Saskatchewan
| ← Highway 24 | → Highway 26 |

Highway 25 is a provincial highway in the Canadian province of Saskatchewan. It is 27 kilometres (17 mi) long and runs from Highway 2 near St. Louis east to the CanAm Highway (Highway 3) near Birch Hills. The highway is a gravel road except for small paved sections near the eastern and western termini.

== History ==
Highway 25 is part of the original Provincial Highway 3, which from Melfort travelled west to St. Louis, crossed the South Saskatchewan River via the St. Louis Bridge, and travelled concurrent with Highway 2 to Prince Albert. In 1970, Highway 3 was realigned to the newly constructed Muskoday Bridge and the bypassed segment between Birch Hills and St. Louis was renumbered to Highway 25.

== Route description ==
Highway 25's western terminus begins at Highway 2 (Veterans Memorial Highway), 1.9 kilometres (1.2 mi) east of in St. Louis, south of Prince Albert and north of Wakaw. Highway 25 travels east from there towards Hagen, where it takes a north-easterly route to Birch Hills and its eastern terminus at the CanAm Highway (Highway 3).

== Major intersections ==
From west to east:

| Rural municipality | Location | km | mi | Destinations | Notes |
|---|---|---|---|---|---|
| St. Louis No. 431 | St. Louis | −1.9 | −1.2 | Highway 782 west (Riverside Drive) / Old Highway 2 | Former Highway 25 western terminus; present-day Highway 782; near St. Louis Bridge |
| St. Louis No. 431– Birch Hills No. 460 boundary | | 0.0 | 0.0 | Highway 782 ends Highway 2 (Veterans Memorial Highway) – Wakaw, Prince Albert | Highway 25 western terminus; Highway 782 eastern terminus; western end of paved section |
| St. Louis No. 431– Birch Hills No. 460 boundary | | 1.2 | 0.75 | Pavement ends | |
| St. Louis No. 431– Birch Hills No. 460 boundary | | 13.2 | 8.2 | Range Road 2254 – Fenton, Fenton Ferry | |
| St. Louis No. 431– Birch Hills No. 460 boundary | | 14.8 | 9.2 | Lewis Street – Hagen | |
| Birch Hills No. 460 | Birch Hills | 24.5 | 15.2 | Wilson Street | Western end of paved section |
| Birch Hills No. 460 | Birch Hills | 27.1 | 16.8 | Highway 3 / CanAm Highway – Prince Albert, Melfort | Highway 25 eastern terminus; eastern end of paved section |
1.000 mi = 1.609 km; 1.000 km = 0.621 mi: Closed/former

== See also ==
- Transportation in Saskatchewan
- Roads in Saskatchewan
