= Birch Hills (disambiguation) =

Birch Hills is a town in Saskatchewan.

Birch Hills may also refer to:

- Birch Hills County, a municipal district in Alberta
- Birch Hills No. 460, Saskatchewan, a rural municipality
