= Morin Lake =

Lake in Saskatchewan, Canada

- Location in Saskatchewan Morin Lake (Canada)
- Location: RM of Canwood No. 494, Saskatchewan
- Coordinates: 53.5001°N 107.0672°W
- Type: Glacial lake
- Part of: Churchill River drainage basin
- Primary inflows: Spring-fed
- River sources: Thickwood Hills
- Primary outflows: Big River
- Basin countries: Canada
- Max. length: 7.3 km (4.5 mi)
- Max. width: 1.61 km (1 mi)
- Surface area: 242.8 ha (600 acres)
- Max. depth: 54.8 m (180 ft)
- Shore length^{1}: 9.6 km (6 mi)
- Surface elevation: 372 m (1,220 ft)
- Settlements: Victoire
- ^{1} Shore length is not a well-defined measure.

Morin Lake is a small lake north-west of Prince Albert in the Canadian province of Saskatchewan. It is a spring-fed, glacial lake situated in the Thickwood Hills and surrounded by boreal forest. From the north end of the lake, a short stream flows out and meets Big River.

A regional park, the small community of Victoire, and Bay View Estates are on Morin Lake's eastern shore and Big River 118 Indian reserve is to the north. Access to the lake and its amenities is from Highways 695 and 793.

== Morin Lake Regional Park ==
Morin Lake Regional Park (53.4978°N 107.0539°W) is a regional park on the eastern shore of Morin Lake. The park was founded in July 1984 on five acres of land donated by Albert Lalonde Sr. Since its establishment, more land has been purchased and amenities expanded. There is a campground, playground, sandy beach, and access to the lake for fishing and boating.

== Fish species ==
Fish commonly found in Morin Lake include walleye, northern pike, whitefish, and perch. The lake is occasionally stocked with walleye fry.

== See also ==
- List of lakes of Saskatchewan
- Tourism in Saskatchewan
