= Sturgeon Lake First Nation =

First Nation in Saskatchewan, Canada

The Sturgeon Lake First Nation (Cree: ᓇᒦᐏ ᓵᑲᐦᐃᑲᓂᕽ, namîwi-sâkahikanihk) is a Cree First Nation band government in Saskatchewan, Canada. Its location is on the eastern shore of Sturgeon Lake about 30 km northwest of Prince Albert. The First Nation's territory consists of one reserve, Sturgeon Lake 101. It is located in the transition zone between the aspen parkland and boreal forest biomes. The reserve borders the Rural Municipalities of Shellbrook No. 493 and Buckland No. 491, as well as the Little Red River 106C.

== History ==
On August 23, 1876, Chief Ah-yah-tus-kum-ik-im-am (Chief William Twatt) and four headmen signed Treaty Six at Fort Carlton and selected their reserve. The First Nation is today predominantly Cree culturally but also has some Saulteaux members. It was originally known as the William Twatt Band after the Orcadian surname of the Treaty Chief, who was the Grandson of Magnus Twatt who came from Orkney (off the North coast of Scotland) in 1771 to work for the Hudson's Bay Company, but changed its name in 1963 to the Sturgeon Lake Band, and later to the Sturgeon Lake First Nation. The 2001 settling of a grievance between the band and the federal government concerning a loss of timber revenue that dated back to 1906 has enabled the community to expand its economic opportunities.

== Reserves ==
Sturgeon Lake First Nation has reserved for themselves five reserves:

- Sturgeon Lake 101
- Sturgeon Lake 101A
- Sturgeon Lake 101B
- Sturgeon Lake 101C
- Sturgeon Lake 101D

== Infrastructure ==
The community's infrastructure includes a band office, school, gymnasium, fire hall, band hall, community health clinic, and a healing lodge. Currently 1,578 of the 2,188 band members live on their 9,209.5-ha reserve.

== People from Sturgeon Lake First Nation ==
- Belinda Daniels, language teacher
