= Muskoday Bridge =

Bridge across the South Saskatchewan River in Saskatchewan, Canada

- Coordinates: 53.085°N 105.499°W
- Carries: Traffic (Hwy 3)
- Crosses: South Saskatchewan River
- Locale: Muskoday
- Official name: Muskoday Bridge

Location
- Interactive map of Muskoday Bridge

The Muskoday Bridge is a traffic bridge that spans the South Saskatchewan River in Saskatchewan, Canada. The bridge is in the Muskoday First Nation Indian reserve. It was completed on October 21, 1970. The bridge carries Highway 3 linking Prince Albert with Birch Hills.

== See also ==
- List of crossings of the South Saskatchewan River
- List of bridges in Canada
