= Canwood =

- Village
- Village of Canwood
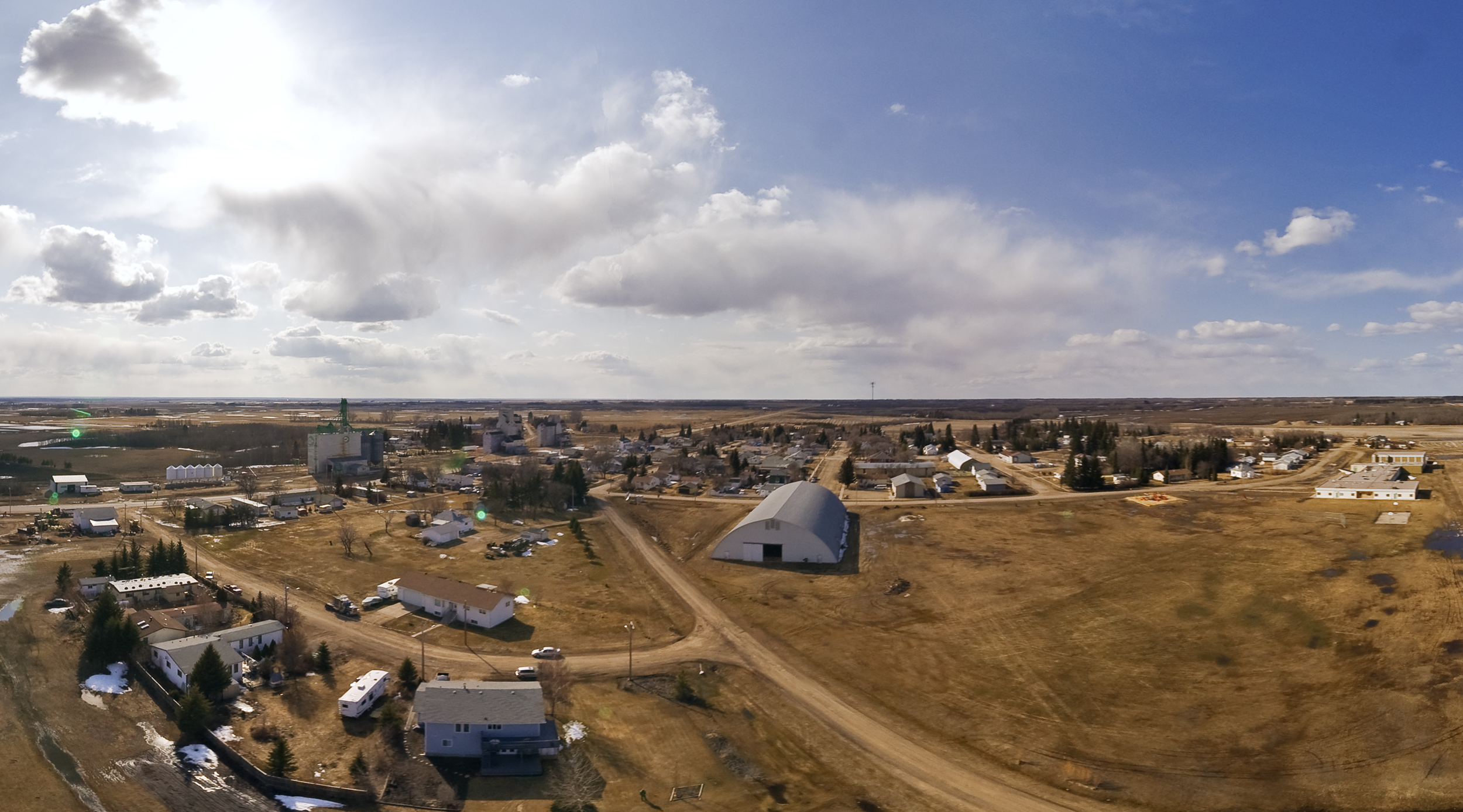
- Aerial image of Canwood looking towards the west

- Location of Canwood in Saskatchewan
- Coordinates: 53.36°N 106.6°W
- Country: Canada
- Province: Saskatchewan
- Census division: 16
- Rural Municipality: Canwood
- Establishment of Post Office: September 1, 1911

Government
  - Type: Municipal
  - Canwood Village Council: Hugh Otterson (Governing body)
  - Mayor: Hugh Otterson
  - Administrator: Lindsey Olson
  - MLA: Scott Moe - Rosthern-Shellbrook
  - MP: Rob Clarke - Desnethé—Missinippi—Churchill River

Area
  - Total: 2.56 km^{2} (0.99 sq mi)
  - Land: 129.6 km^{2} (50.0 sq mi)
- Elevation: 482 m (1,581 ft)

Population (2021)
  - Total: 314
  - Density: 2.42/km^{2} (6.28/sq mi)
- Time zone: UTC−6 (CST)
- Postal Code: S0J 0K0
- Area code: 306
- Highways: Highway 55 Highway 694
- Website: www.canwood.ca

Canwood (2021 population: 314) is a village in the Canadian province of Saskatchewan within the Rural Municipality of Canwood No. 494 and Census Division No. 16.

== History ==
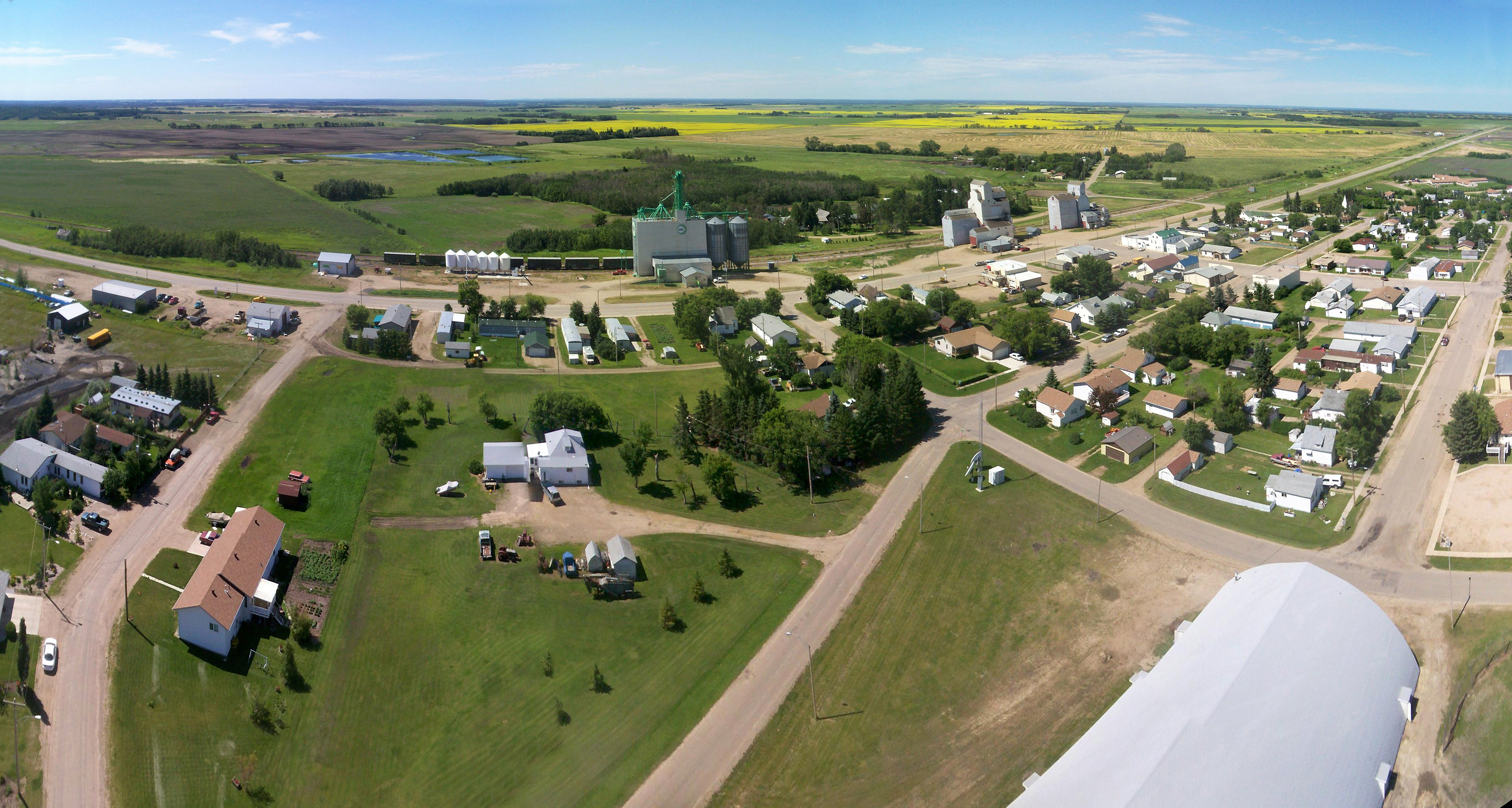
Aerial photo of Canwood looking towards the south, taken July 2006

Since it was settled, Canwood has gone through four name changes. Records kept by the post office show the original name of the settlement was Parksiding, but no evidence has shown it ever operated under that name. The post office opened September 1, 1911, operating under the name McQuan; this was a typographical error, and three months later the name was corrected to McOwan. This name honoured Alexander McOwan, a pioneer settler who was an immigration agent, estate manager, and author. On June 1, 1912, the community's name was changed again to Forgaard to honour Jens Forgaard, a Norwegian-born settler who had emigrated from Minnesota. Exactly one year later, on June 1, 1913, the name was changed for the last time to Canwood, which is a portmanteau of Canadian Woodlands. Canwood incorporated as a village on July 18, 1916.

== Geography ==
Canwood is located along Highway 55, and neighbours the towns of Debden and Shellbrook. The Canwood Regional Park is located 5 kilometres (3 mi) southeast from Canwood along Highway 55. It has 20 campsites, a nine-hole golf course, and three baseball diamonds, and is open May through September.

== Demographics ==
Population history (1981–2021)
Year	Pop.	±%
1981	340	—
1986	355	+4.4%
1991	367	+3.4%
1996	345	−6.0%
2001	374	+8.4%
2006	337	−9.9%
2011	348	+3.3%
2016	332	−4.6%
2021	314	−5.4%
Source: Statistics Canada via Saskatchewan Bureau of Statistics

In the 2021 Census of Population conducted by Statistics Canada, Canwood had a population of 314 living in 154 of its 168 total private dwellings, a change of −5.4% from its 2016 population of 332. With a land area of 2.42 km^{2} (0.93 sq mi), it had a population density of 129.8/km^{2} (336.1/sq mi) in 2021.

In the 2016 Census of Population, the Village of Canwood recorded a population of 314 living in 154 of its 168 total private dwellings, a −5.7% change from its 2016 population of 332. With a land area of 2.42 km^{2} (0.93 sq mi), it had a population density of 129.8/km^{2} (336.1/sq mi) in 2021.

== Education ==
Canwood Community School is the only educational institution in Canwood. Part of the Saskatchewan Rivers School Division #119, it educates students from Kindergarten to Grade 12. Higher education can be pursued out of town at the Saskatchewan Institute of Applied Science and Technology, University of Saskatchewan, or University of Regina.

== Urban legend ==
An urban legend says Albert Einstein played goal for the Canwood Canucks one winter while travelling to find peace and silence for his work on the Theory of Relativity. This story has been found to be implausible by media observers; in addition to the unlikeliness of Einstein visiting the rural community of Canwood, the Canwood Canucks hockey team was formed in 1958, three years after his death.

== See also ==
- List of communities in Saskatchewan
- List of villages in Saskatchewan
