= Brancepeth =

Brancepeth may refer to:

- Brancepeth, County Durham, village of England
- Brancepeth, Saskatchewan, hamlet in Canda
- New Brancepeth, village of Country Durham, England
