= Shell River (Saskatchewan) =

River in Saskatchewan, Canada

Shell River Shell Brook
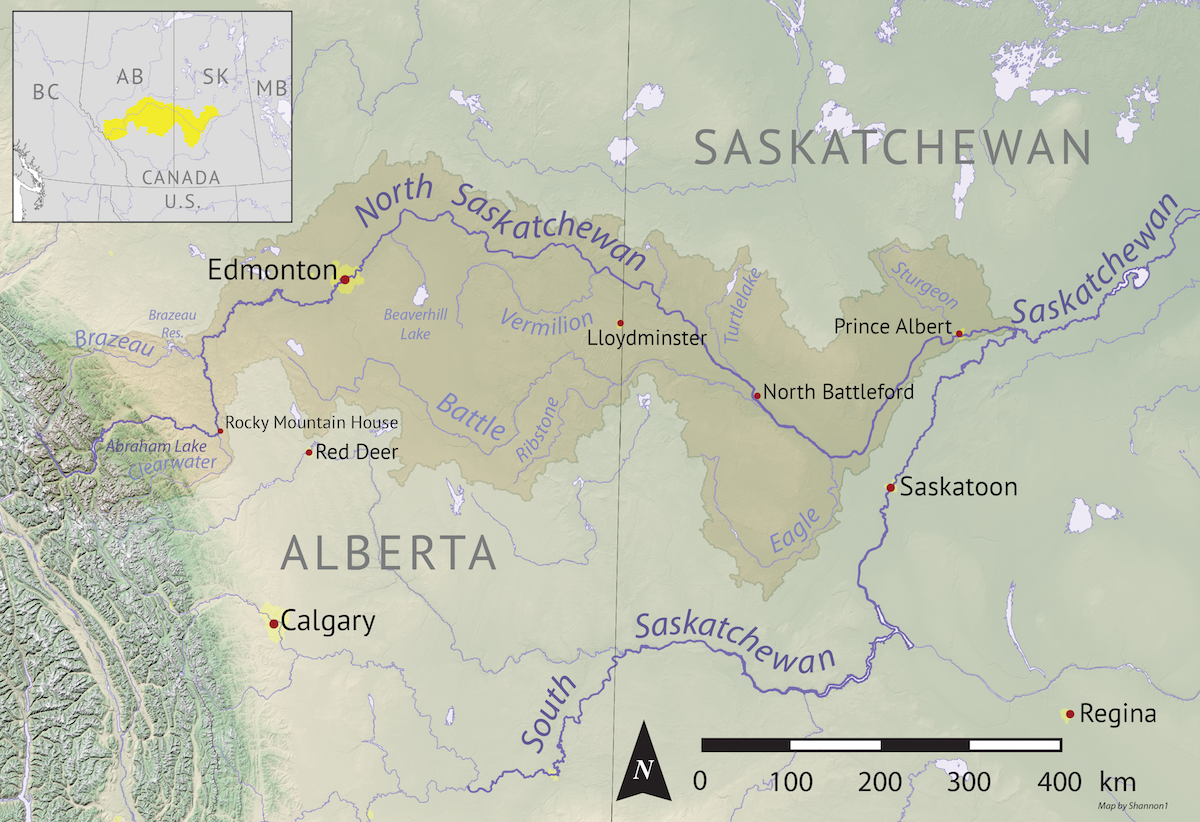
- North Saskatchewan River drainage basin

- Location of the mouth in Saskatchewan Shell River (Saskatchewan) (Canada)

Location
- Country: Canada
- Province: Saskatchewan

Physical characteristics
- Source: Big Shell Lake
  - location: RM of Spiritwood No. 496
  - coordinates: 53.2287°N 107.1487°W
  - elevation: 578 m (1,896 ft)
- Mouth: Sturgeon River
  - location: RM of Buckland No. 491
  - coordinates: 53.3494°N 106.0003°W

Basin features
- River system: Sturgeon River
- Tributaries
  - left: Sucker Creek
  - right: Mistawasis Creek

Shell River, formerly known as Shell Brook, is a river in the north-central region of the Canadian province of Saskatchewan. The river begins at Big Shell Lake and travels in an easterly direction and flows into the Sturgeon River north of the city of Prince Albert. The upper reaches of its watershed are as far west as the Thickwood Hills.

== Course ==
The Shell River begins in the RM of Spiritwood No. 496 at the northern end of Big Shell Lake and flows north for about three kilometres before emptying into Little Shell Lake. From Little Shell Lake, the river carries on north-east past Memorial Lake Regional Park and the village of Shell Lake. From Shell Lake, the Shell River heads north towards Big River 118A Indian reserve and then loops back down south passing through Ahtahkakoop 104 Indian reserve where it begins heading in an eastward direction. Along this leg of the route, it is joined by several tributaries, enters the RM of Shellbrook No. 493, and passes by the community of Shellbrook, which took its name from the river. From Shellbrook, Shell River continues eastward and meets with the Sturgeon River in the RM of Buckland No. 491. The Sturgeon River carries on southward and joins the North Saskatchewan River on the west side of Prince Albert.

== Tributaries ==
The following are the tributaries of Shell River from its headwaters at Shell Lake to its mouth at Sturgeon River:

- Mistowasis Creek
- Tippicanoe Creek
- Vant Creek
- Sucker Creek

== See also ==
- List of rivers of Saskatchewan
- Hudson Bay drainage basin
