= Sturgeon Lake 101 =

Indian reserve in Saskatchewan, Canada

Coordinates: 53°23′48″N 106°03′36″W

- Indian reserve
- Sturgeon Lake Indian Reserve No. 101
- Location in Saskatchewan
- First Nation: Sturgeon Lake
- Country: Canada
- Province: Saskatchewan

Area
  - Total: 8,889 ha (21,970 acres)

Population (2016)
  - Total: 1,174
  - Density: 13.21/km^{2} (34.21/sq mi)
- Community Well-Being Index: 43

Sturgeon Lake 101 is an Indian reserve of the Sturgeon Lake First Nation in Saskatchewan. It is about 29 kilometres (18 mi) north-west of Prince Albert on the shores of Sturgeon Lake. In the 2016 Canadian Census, it recorded a population of 1174 living in 287 of its 293 total private dwellings. In the same year, its Community Well-Being index was calculated at 43 of 100, compared to 58.4 for the average First Nations community and 77.5 for the average non-Indigenous community.

== See also ==
- List of Indian reserves in Saskatchewan
