= Big River First Nation =

First Nation

- Band No. 404
- mistahi-sîpîhk ᒥᐢᑕᐦᐃ ᓰᐲᕁ
- People: Cree
- Treaty: Treaty 6
- Headquarters: Debden
- Province: Saskatchewan

Land
- Main reserve: Big River 118
- Reserve: Big River 118A
- Land area: 119.648 km^{2} (46.196 sq mi)

Population (2022)
- On reserve: 2556
- On other land: 202
- Off reserve: 1095
- Total population: 3863

Government
- Chief: Jonathon Bear
- Council size: 12
- Council: Leonard Lachance, Noreen Morin, Marvin Netmaker, Jonathon Bear, Robert Rabbitskin, Isadore Weenonis, Sylvia McAdam, Michael Crookedneck, Tyrone Morin, Marshall Dreaver, Euclid Morin, and Bryan Morin

Website
- bigriverfirstnation.ca

The Big River First Nation is a part of the Cree Nation and is located in the Saskatchewan province of Canada. The Big River First Nation is also called ᒥᐢᑕᐦᐃ ᓰᐲᕁ mistahi-sîpîhk in Cree meaning "at the big river". They are signatories of Treaty 6 are located close to Pelican Lake Ojibway, the Big River and Prince Albert National Park. They are 120 km northwest of the city of Prince Albert and 19 km southwest of the village of Debden. The Big River First Nation has nearly 30,000 acres of reserve land. Their reserves include-

- Big River 118
- Big River 118A

The Big River 118 reserve is 11571.80 hectares and the Big River 118A is 393 hectares in area. Their administrative headquarters are located in the village of Debden and the two reserves are located west of Debden. The Cree is the largest Native population in Canada and has 154 bands, one of them being the Big River First Nation. The Big River First Nation is band number 404 out of Canada's 634 Federally Recognized First Nation bands. As of 2022, The Big River First Nation had a total population of 3863, with 2556 people living on-reserve and 1095 people living off-reserve. They have 407 dwellings, of which 366 are occupied.

== History ==
The Big River First Nation is located roughly 98 km northwest of the city of Prince Albert in the Saskatchewan province of Canada. At this time, it is unclear when the Indigenous peoples initially settled along the banks of the Oklemow-Cee-Pee River (Big River). The first Chief of the Big River First Nation, Cree Chief See-See-Way-um, signed Treaty 6 on September 3, 1878. The band took Treaty 6 under Chief Flying Dust at Fort Carlton in 1878. However, they broke away and only occupied the reserve about a decade later, led by Chief Kenemotayo (okinomotayew, "long goatee [like a moose]"), who had been one of Flying Dust's headmen. Chief Kenemotayo was also the second chief of the Big River First Nation. Following the Treaty, for the next two decades, the Big River First Nation continued to be self-sufficient through hunting, trapping, and fishing.

== Governance ==
The Big River First Nation follows a custom electoral system. The current chief of the Big River First Nation is Chief Jack Rayne. The current twelve Tribal Council members are Leonard Lachance, Noreen Morin, Marvin Netmaker, Jonathon Bear, Robert Rabbitskin, Isadore Weenonis, Sylvia McAdam, Michael Crookedneck, Tyrone Morin, Marshall Dreaver, Euclid Morin, and Bryan Morin. Typically each term lasts 4 years and the current council members were appointed on October 2, 2019, and their current term expires on October 1, 2023. The Big River First Nation has certain community goals regarding Governance which include being transparent and accountable financially and administratively as well as supporting community development through the establishment of policies and laws.

== Justice System ==
The Big River First Nation falls under the Whitefish (Big River) First Nation (Cree Court) Circuit Point. Their community goals regarding Justice include building trust between their members and the Royal Canada Mounted Police (RCMP), and to helping and supporting members of the Big River First Nation with their dealings with the justice system. As a Nation primarily of Cree, the Big River First Nation falls under The Cree Court. This means that the hearings consist primarily or entirely in Cree. The court deals with issues of crime and child protection. Cree Courts are quite similar to other Provincial Court circuits, except that in Cree Courts almost everyone involved, including judges, clerks and accused persons converse in Cree. The lawyers are permitted to speak English and the accused may either speak the Indigenous language of Cree or English. The Cree Court is the first of its kind across Canada and has many benefits. These benefits include, but are not limited to, improving communication of the accused to suit their needs, and understanding the importance of First Nation culture, language, community, and traditional values.

== Culture ==
The Big River First Nation's community goal regarding culture is to connect members to their culture. As they are part of the Cree Nation, Big River First Nation has made significant efforts to respect, protect, and promote the values of the Cree community. They hold many workshops throughout the year for its members to practice important Cree traditions of oral history, oral storytelling, land-based life skills, and cultural camps. These workshops are often based on the age of their members, meaning based on their age, meaning that parents, teen parents, and youth are given special workshops. The Mistahi Sipiy Elementary School and the Se-Se-Wa-Hum High School have an Elders Program which gives students access to cultural teachings.

As Big River First Nation is a Cree Nation, the Cree language plays a crucial role in the community. According to census data from 2016, a majority of 57% of the youth population have knowledge of the Indigenous language, which in this case is Cree. It is also the first language of nearly 33% of the youth population. Comparatively, only 3.5% of the total population of Saskatchewan has knowledge of the Indigenous language(s). Cree is crucial in the Justice System of the Big River First Nation as they fall under the Whitefish (Big River) First Nation (Cree Court) Circuit Point. In this court, most of the proceedings are done in the Cree language.

In addition to workshops and the Elders Program, the Big River First Nation strengthen their culture by hosting and attending events of sun dances, chicken dances, round dances, community feasts and pow wows. Pow wows are ceremonies in Native American and First Nation cultures where individuals meet and socialize through cultural events and activities. They are very important to the Big River First Nation and the community also has a pow wow arbour project. Sun dances have an important role in Big River First Nation culture as well. Sun Dance, which is also sometimes referred to as Rain or Thirst Dance, is a sacred ceremony done to reaffirm their beliefs and ways and celebrate good health, safe community, and a good harvest.

== Education ==
The Big River First Nation has one elementary school and one high school in the reserves. Their community goals include enhancing youth and adult education programming and investing in post-secondary education.

The Mistahi Sipiy Elementary School has approximately 360 students currently enrolled from nursery to grade five. The Se-Se-Wa-Hum High School had an enrollment of 350 students from grade six to grade twelve during the 2019–2020 school year. Their principles are Lyle Whitefish and Kavia Burns respectively. The programs in High School include sports activities and cultural programs. Both Mistahi Sipiy Elementary School and the Se-Se-Wa-Hum High School have lunch programs for their students through which they provide a healthy breakfast and a hot lunch. They also have an Elder's Program that provides students with access to cultural teachings.

There are a few support programs for students in the Big River First Nation. The Canada Emergency Student Benefit (CESB) provides financial assistance to students that were impacted by COVID-19 and were unable to find work. This benefit applies to post-secondary students and recent post-secondary and high school graduates. Students that do not qualify for CESB are eligible for the Big River First Nation Post Secondary Student Support Program (PSSSP). This program provides funding to Big River First Nation students in order to access education and skill development opportunities at post-secondary levels which include university entrance programs, certificate or diploma programs, Bachelors programs, and Master's and Doctorate programs. Through this program, the costs covered include tuition, books, travel support, and living allowances.

Recently efforts have been made by Mavis Whitefish-Dreaver, a Saskatchewan educator, to introduce a literary camp at the Big River First Nation. COVID-19 pandemic significantly impacted the schooling and reading of Indigenous children and she, along with three other teachers, developed the literary program in order to combat this impact. They started the program by establishing a baseline by using the "Where to Start" assessment through which they assessed the reading levels, behaviors, and comprehension of students. The tests were conducted at the beginning and end of each week. The program was successful as the results show a significant improvement in students regarding their reading skills.

The Big River First Nation is also part of the Treaty Six Education Council, an organization that promotes second-level education services to other First Nations that are a part of the organization. They cater to 11 First Nations and over 3000 students. The values of the organization include promoting education in Indigenous children, honoring Indigenous knowledge and experience, and restoring, and preserving the Treaty and the culture of the First Nations.
