= Crutwell, Saskatchewan =

Community in Saskatchewan, Canada

Coordinates: 53°13′07″N 106°04′06″W

Crutwell is an organized hamlet in Saskatchewan, Canada. Access is from Highway 3.

== Geography ==
It is located in the Rural Municipality of Shellbrook No. 493.

== Demographics ==
In the 2021 Census of Population conducted by Statistics Canada, Crutwell had a population of 77 living in 24 of its 26 total private dwellings, a change of 35.1% from its 2016 population of 57. With a land area of 0.09 km^{2} (0.035 sq mi), it had a population density of 855.6/km^{2} (2,215.9/sq mi) in 2021.

== See also ==
- List of communities in Saskatchewan
