= Diefenbaker Bridge =

Bridge in Prince Albert, Saskatchewan, Canada

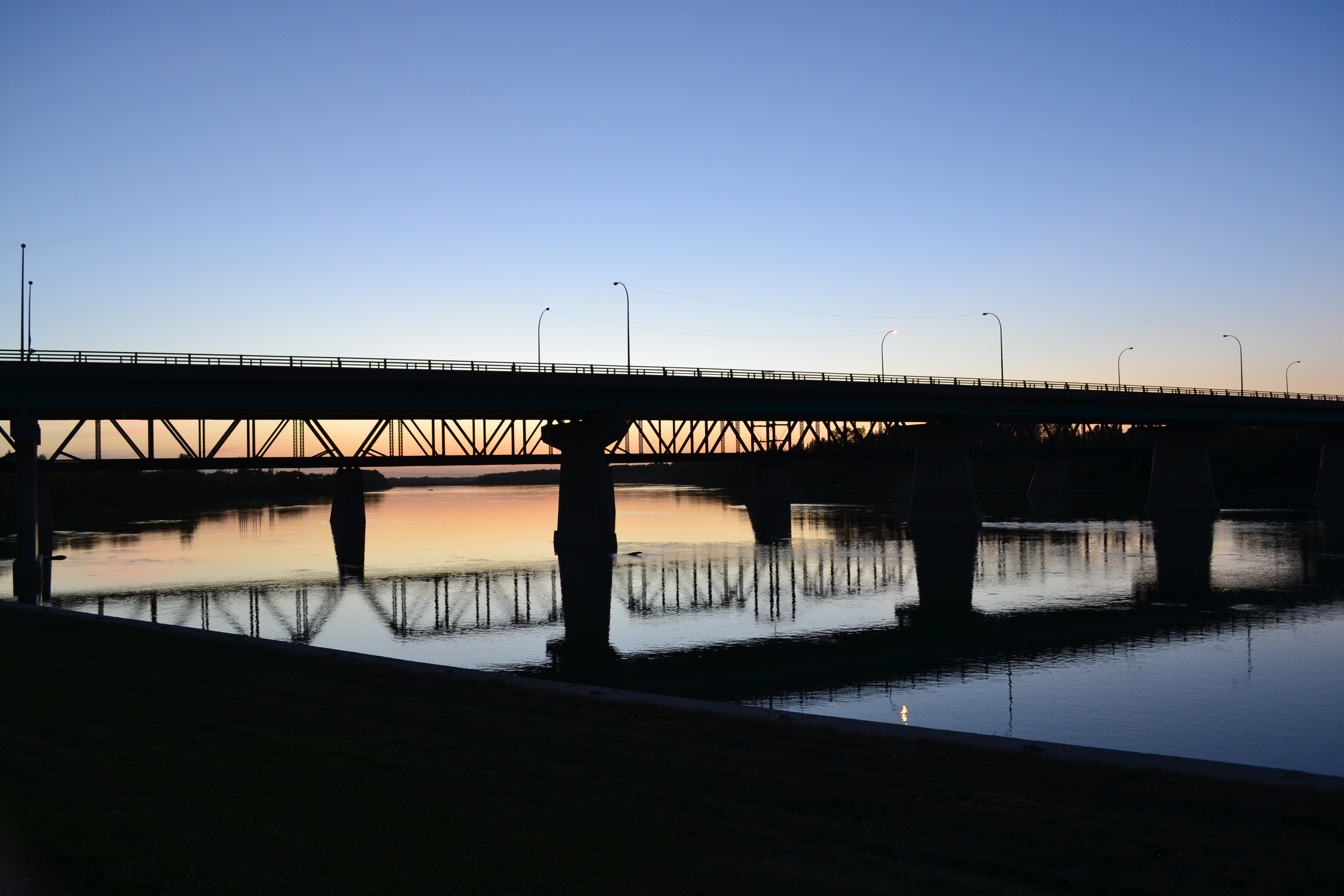
- Diefenbaker Bridge
- Coordinates: 53°12′17″N 105°45′49″W
- Carries: Highway 2 Highway 3
- Crosses: North Saskatchewan River
- Locale: Prince Albert, Saskatchewan, Canada
- Official name: Diefenbaker Bridge
- Maintained by: City of Prince Albert

History
- Construction end: 1960

Location
- Interactive map of Diefenbaker Bridge

The Diefenbaker Bridge is a Canadian bridge that spans the North Saskatchewan River in Prince Albert, Saskatchewan. It is currently the only vehicle crossing of the river in Prince Albert and within 120 km in either direction. The bridge carries Saskatchewan Highways 2 and 3, as well as two sidewalks: with the upstream side connecting to River Street, and the downstream side continuing through to 12 Street W and up 2 Avenue W.

== Overview ==
The bridge is maintained by the city of Prince Albert under an agreement, established in 1958, where the province of Saskatchewan covers 50% of the structural repair costs. Prior to the bridge opening in 1960 vehicle traffic used the nearby Canadian Northern Railway Bridge.

== History ==
In 2011, one of the bridge's girders fractured, resulting in the southbound lanes being closed; and concerns being raised about the lack of additional crossings and dangerous goods crossing the bridge and traversing the city.

== See also ==
- List of crossings of the North Saskatchewan River
- List of bridges in Canada
