= Big Shell, Saskatchewan =

Big Shell
- Resort village
- Resort Village of Big Shell
- Location within Saskatchewan
- Coordinates: 53°11′50″N 107°08′08″W
- Country: Canada
- Province: Saskatchewan
- Census division: 16
- Rural municipality: RM of Spiritwood No. 496
- Incorporated: August 1, 1982

Government
  - Mayor: Jim Wilkie
  - Governing body: Resort Village Council
  - Administrator: Tara Bueckert

Area (2016)
  - Land: 1.02 km^{2} (0.39 sq mi)

Population (2016)
  - Total: 48
  - Density: 43.6/km^{2} (113/sq mi)
- Time zone: CST
  - Summer (DST): CST
- Area codes: 306 and 639
- Waterway(s): Shell Lake

Big Shell (2016 population: 48) is a resort village in the Canadian province of Saskatchewan within Census Division No. 16. It is on the shores of Shell Lake in the Rural Municipality of Spiritwood No. 496.

== History ==
Big Shell incorporated as a resort village on August 1, 1982.

== Demographics ==
Population history (1981–2016)
Year	Pop.	±%
1981		—
1986	0	—
1991	0	0.00%
1996	7	—
2001	16	+128.6%
2006	45	+181.2%
2011	45	+0.0%
2016	48	+6.7%
Source: Statistics Canada via Saskatchewan Bureau of Statistics

In the 2021 Census of Population conducted by Statistics Canada, Big Shell had a population of 64 living in 34 of its 115 total private dwellings, a change of 33.3% from its 2016 population of 48. With a land area of 0.93 km^{2} (0.36 sq mi), it had a population density of 68.8/km^{2} (178.2/sq mi) in 2021.

In the 2016 Census of Population conducted by Statistics Canada, the Resort Village of Big Shell recorded a population of 48 living in 26 of its 111 total private dwellings, a 6.7% change from its 2011 population of 45. With a land area of 1.1 km^{2} (0.42 sq mi), it had a population density of 43.6/km^{2} (113.0/sq mi) in 2016.

== Government ==
The Resort Village of Big Shell is governed by an elected municipal council and an appointed administrator that meets on the third Friday of every month. The mayor is Jim Wilkie and its administrator is Tara Bueckert.

== See also ==
- List of communities in Saskatchewan
- List of municipalities in Saskatchewan
- List of resort villages in Saskatchewan
- List of villages in Saskatchewan
- List of summer villages in Alberta
