= Canadian Northern Railway Bridge (Prince Albert, Saskatchewan) =

Bridge in Prince Albert, Saskatchewan, Canada

- Coordinates: 53.205°N 105.762°W
- Carries: Carlton Trail Railway
- Crosses: North Saskatchewan River
- Locale: Prince Albert, Saskatchewan, Canada
- Official name: Canadian Northern Railway Bridge
- Maintained by: Carlton Trail Railway

Characteristics
- Design: Truss bridge
- Material: Steel, wood, concrete
- Total length: 341 metres (1,119 ft)
- Piers in water: 8

History
- Construction start: September 1907
- Construction end: 1909
- Opened: April, 1909

Location
- Interactive map of Canadian Northern Railway Bridge

The Canadian Northern Railway Bridge is a Canadian railway bridge that spans the North Saskatchewan River in Prince Albert, Saskatchewan.

== Overview ==
The bridge was built by the Canadian Northern Railway between 1907 and 1909 with the superstructure supplied by the Hamilton Bridge Company. Originally designed as a joint railway and road bridge the bridge consisted of a centre rail line with 3.7-metre (12 ft) extensions on each side for traffic. These traffic lanes remained in use until 1960 when the nearby Diefenbaker Bridge opened. The layout of the bridge consisted of three 45-metre (146 ft) steel trusses, a 78-metre (256 ft) swing span truss and two additional 48-metre (156 ft) fixed trusses. The centre swing span was used to permit the passage of steamboats on the river and movement of logs until 1918 when the downstream sawmill shut down operations and a dam was constructed downstream in 1937. In 1939 the Department of Transport granted the railway permission to convert the moveable span into a fixed span.

== See also ==
- List of crossings of the North Saskatchewan River
- List of bridges in Canada
- List of road-rail bridges
