= Holbein, Saskatchewan =

Hamlet in Saskatchewan, Canada

Holbein
- Hamlet
- Location within Saskatchewan Location within Canada
- Coordinates: 53°13′59″N 106°11′41″W
- Country: Canada
- Province: Saskatchewan
- Rural municipality: Shellbrook No. 493

Area
  - Total: 0.5 km^{2} (0.19 sq mi)
  - Land: 0.5 km^{2} (0.19 sq mi)
  - Water: 0 km^{2} (0 sq mi)

Population (2021)
  - Total: 122
  - Density: 244/km^{2} (630/sq mi)
- Time zone: UTC-6 (CST)
  - Summer (DST): UTC-5 (CDT)

Holbein is an organized hamlet in Saskatchewan, Canada, that lies within the Rural Municipality of Shellbrook No. 493. Access is from Highway 3.

== Demographics ==
In the 2021 Census of Population conducted by Statistics Canada, Holbein had a population of 122 living in 48 of its 54 total private dwellings, a change of 11.9% from its 2016 population of 109. With a land area of 0.5 km^{2} (0.19 sq mi), it had a population density of 244.0/km^{2} (632.0/sq mi) in 2021.

== See also ==
- List of communities in Saskatchewan
