= Muskoday 99B =

Indian reserve in Saskatchewan, Canada

Coordinates: 53°36′28″N 105°31′55″W

- Indian reserve
- Muskoday Indian Reserve No. 99B
- Location in Saskatchewan
- First Nation: Muskoday
- Country: Canada
- Province: Saskatchewan

Area
  - Total: 312.7 ha (773 acres)

Muskoday 99B is an Indian reserve of the Muskoday First Nation in Saskatchewan.

== See also ==
- List of Indian reserves in Saskatchewan
