= Rural Municipality of Birch Hills No. 460 =

Rural municipality in Saskatchewan, Canada

Birch Hills No. 460
- Rural municipality
- Rural Municipality of Birch Hills No. 460

- Location of the RM of Birch Hills No. 460 in Saskatchewan
- Coordinates: 53.059°N 105.486°W
- Country: Canada
- Province: Saskatchewan
- Census division: 15
- SARM division: 5
- Formed: December 11, 1911

Government
  - Reeve: Brent Fenner
  - Governing body: RM of Birch Hills No. 460 Council
  - Administrator: Cherie Opseth
  - Office location: Birch Hills

Area (2016)
  - Land: 554.07 km^{2} (213.93 sq mi)

Population (2016)
  - Total: 656
  - Density: 1.2/km^{2} (3.1/sq mi)
- Time zone: CST
  - Summer (DST): CST
- Area codes: 306 and 639

The Rural Municipality of Birch Hills No. 460 (2016 population: 656) is a rural municipality (RM) in the Canadian province of Saskatchewan within Census Division No. 15 and SARM Division No. 5. It is located in the north-central portion of the province on Highway 3 southeast of Prince Albert and north of Saskatoon.

== History ==
The RM of Birch Hills No. 460 incorporated as a rural municipality on December 11, 1911. The RM's name comes from all of the hills to the south and east and the abundance of birch trees which once covered the area.

== Geography ==
The RM is part of the aspen parkland biome.

=== Communities and localities ===
The following urban municipalities are surrounded by the RM.

Towns

- Birch Hills

The following unincorporated communities are within the RM.

Organized hamlets

- Brancepeth
- Hagen

The Muskoday First Nation Indian reserve lies adjacent to the RM.

== Demographics ==
Population history (1981–2016)
Year	Pop.	±%
1981	890	—
1986	871	−2.1%
1991	836	−4.0%
1996	775	−7.3%
2001	782	+0.9%
2006	701	−10.4%
2011	663	−5.4%
2016	656	−1.1%
Source: Statistics Canada via Saskatchewan Bureau of Statistics

In the 2021 Census of Population conducted by Statistics Canada, the RM of Birch Hills No. 460 had a population of 658 living in 247 of its 272 total private dwellings, a change of 0.3% from its 2016 population of 656. With a land area of 547.08 km^{2} (211.23 sq mi), it had a population density of 1.2/km^{2} (3.1/sq mi) in 2021.

In the 2016 Census of Population, the RM of Birch Hills No. 460 recorded a population of 656 living in 242 of its 263 total private dwellings, a −1.1% change from its 2011 population of 663. With a land area of 554.07 km^{2} (213.93 sq mi), it had a population density of 1.2/km^{2} (3.1/sq mi) in 2016.

== Education ==
The RM is within the Saskatchewan Rivers School Division No. 119.

== Government ==
The RM of Birch Hills No. 460 is governed by an elected municipal council and an appointed administrator that meets on the second Wednesday of every month. The reeve of the RM is Brent Fenner while its administrator is Cherie Opseth. The RM's office is located in Birch Hills.
