= Sturgeon Lake (Saskatchewan) =

Lake in Saskatchewan, Canada

- Location in Saskatchewan Sturgeon Lake (Canada)
- Location: RM of Shellbrook No. 493 / Sturgeon Lake Indian reserve, Saskatchewan
- Coordinates: 53.4217°N 106.0059°W
- Part of: Saskatchewan River drainage basin
- Primary inflows: Sturgeon River
- Primary outflows: Sturgeon River
- Basin countries: Canada
- Surface area: 542 ha (1,340 acres)
- Max. depth: 17.98 m (59.0 ft)
- Shore length^{1}: 39 km (24 mi)
- Surface elevation: 458 m (1,503 ft)
- ^{1} Shore length is not a well-defined measure.

Sturgeon Lake is a lake in the Canadian province of Saskatchewan. It is a small, narrow body of water situated in the transition zone between the aspen parkland and boreal forest biomes. It is located along the course of Sturgeon River, which has its headwaters in Prince Albert National Park and the Waskesiu Hills. The Sturgeon River is a tributary of the North Saskatchewan River. A small dam at the eastern end of the lake helps regulate water levels.

Sturgeon Lake is about 48 kilometres (30 mi) north-west of the city of Prince Albert. The lake is surrounded by the Sturgeon Lake 101 Indian reserve and the RM of Shellbrook No. 493. Access to Sturgeon Lake is from Highways 788 and 693.

== Sturgeon Lake Regional Park ==
Sturgeon Lake Regional Park (53.4221°N 106.1541°W) is a regional park on the northern shore of Sturgeon Lake. Founded in 1965, the park offers camping, boating, swimming, and picnicking. The campground has 55 campsites, potable water, washrooms and showers, and electrical hook-ups. The park also has a store, restaurant, and canoe / kayak rentals. The park was awarded the Saskatchewan Regional Park of the Year in 2014.

A new boat launch with two cement ramps was installed in the park in 2023.

== Fish species ==
Fish commonly found in the lake include northern pike, yellow perch, and walleye.

== See also ==
- List of lakes of Saskatchewan
- Tourism in Saskatchewan
