= Muskoday 99A =

Indian reserve in Saskatchewan, Canada

Coordinates: 53°33′10″N 105°30′23″W

- Indian reserve
- Muskoday Indian Reserve No. 99A
- Location in Saskatchewan
- First Nation: Muskoday
- Country: Canada
- Province: Saskatchewan

Area
  - Total: 259 ha (640 acres)

Muskoday 99A is an Indian reserve of the Muskoday First Nation in Saskatchewan.

== See also ==
- List of Indian reserves in Saskatchewan
