= Fairholme, Saskatchewan =

Community in Saskatchewan, Canada

Coordinates: 53°25′36″N 108°32′23″W

Fairholme is a hamlet in the Canadian province of Saskatchewan. Access is from Highway 3.

== Demographics ==
In the 2021 Census of Population conducted by Statistics Canada, Fairholme had a population of 20 living in 8 of its 10 total private dwellings, a change of 33.3% from its 2016 population of 15. With a land area of 0.16 km^{2} (0.062 sq mi), it had a population density of 125.0/km^{2} (323.7/sq mi) in 2021.

== See also ==
- List of communities in Saskatchewan
