= John Smith (hereditary chief) =

First Nations chief from Saskatchewan, c. 1836–1922

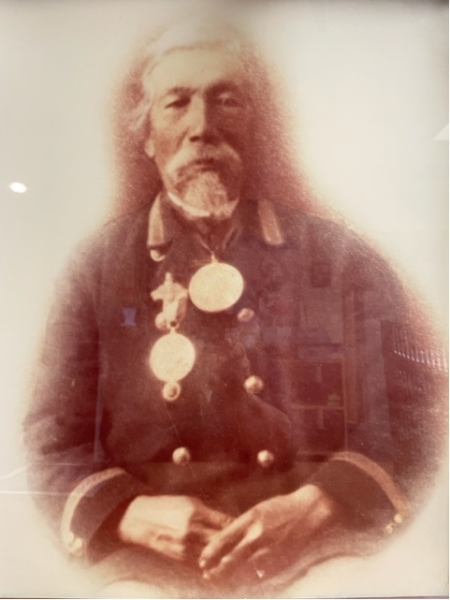
- Born: Mis-ti-koo-na-pac c. 1836; St. Peter's Indian Reserve (Peguis)
- Died: c. 1924; John Smith First Nation (present day Muskoday Cree Nation)
- Burial place: Saint James Anglican Church, Saskatchewan.
- Occupations: political leader and diplomat
- Years active: 1870s–1922
- Known for: establishing the Muskoday First Nation
- Title: Hereditary Chief
- Spouse: Nancy Badger

Chief John Smith (c. 1836 – 1924) was a Cree and Saulteaux First Nations leader in what is now Saskatchewan, Canada. He is best known as the founder and longtime chief of the Muskoday First Nation (originally called the John Smith First Nation) and as a signatory to Treaty 6 in 1876. His leadership spanned the transition from the pre-treaty era through the early reserve period.

== Early life ==
John Smith was born around 1836 in the St. Peter's Indian Reserve (Peguis), near Selkirk in what is now Manitoba. He was of Cree and Saulteaux (Ojibwe) ancestry, one of several brothers from a prominent family in the St. Peter's band. His younger brother, James Smith (1843–1902), would later become the founding chief of the James Smith Cree Nation in Saskatchewan. During the 1860s and 1870s, he worked as a labourer and voyageur for the Hudson’s Bay Company, gaining experience in the fur trade and travel across the prairies.

In the early 1870s, Smith led a group of Cree and Saulteaux families (including his brothers and their kin) westward from St. Peter's to settle along the South Saskatchewan River, near present-day Prince Albert in the North-West Territories (Saskatchewan). They took up farming and hunting in the area, forming the nucleus of what would become the John Smith band.

== Treaty 6 and leadership ==
As the Canadian government sought treaties on the Plains, John Smith emerged as a leading representative of his band. He and his followers were among the chiefs and headmen who entered into Treaty 6 with the Crown at Fort Carlton in 1876. On August 23, 1876, Chief Smith, known in the Cree language as Mis-ti-koo-na-pac, added his mark to Treaty 6 at Fort Carlton, alongside other Plains Cree leaders such as Chiefs Mistawasis and Ahtahkakoop. By signing the treaty, Smith agreed to peacefully cede vast territories to the Crown in exchange for reserve lands, annual payments, and other provisions for his people. The treaty also included promises of farming equipment, a medicine chest for healthcare, and protection from famine, reflecting new terms not present in earlier treaties.

Following the treaty, a reserve for John Smith's band was surveyed in the fall of 1876 about 19 km southeast of the settlement of Prince Albert. This reserve, initially about 36 square miles in size, was legally established as the “John Smith Indian Reserve.” It was named after Chief John Smith himself, in recognition of his status as the band's leader. John Smith became the first hereditary chief of the new reserve, a role he would occupy for the next 48 years until his death. Under his leadership, the band transitioned into a settled farming community in accordance with the treaty terms.

Smith's band, composed of both Cree and Saulteaux members, initially organized their new reserve in the style of river-lot farms along the South Saskatchewan River. By 1878, a day school had been established on the reserve, reflecting early efforts at education and assimilation. Throughout the late 19th century, Chief Smith guided the community in adopting agriculture. The Muskoday (John Smith) Reserve became known for its successful farms and cattle ranching – contemporary records noted that band members maintained excellent herds of Shorthorn and Holstein cattle, often outpacing neighboring settler farms in productivity. At times the band's farming progress was constrained by government policies and the Indian Act’s restrictive provisions, but Smith's leadership helped ensure a degree of prosperity and food security for his people in the early reserve period.

== Later years and death ==
In the early 20th century, Chief John Smith continued to advocate for the interests of his band. During his later years, the band experienced challenges common to many First Nations on the prairies. For example, between 1914 and 1918 the John Smith band pursued a claim to additional traditional lands around Candle Lake (north of their reserve), but this land claim was ultimately denied by authorities at the time. This loss foreshadowed ongoing grievances about the adequacy of the reserve land base.

By the 1910s, John Smith was elderly but remained a respected figure and the official chief of the reserve. His wife, Nancy, had died around 1903, and some of his sons began taking on greater responsibilities in band affairs. In 1916, Smith (then in his early 80s) was recorded living with his son's family on the reserve, indicating that he remained involved in the community's life well into old age. He saw the band through the difficult World War I era, when many Indigenous communities suffered economic hardship and increasing government control.

Chief John Smith died in 1924, at approximately 87–88 years of age. He had led his band for 48 years since the signing of Treaty 6, making him one of the longest-serving chiefs of his time. Upon his death, leadership of the community passed to his chosen successor and relative, Robert Bear, who served as the next hereditary chief (1924–1947). John Smith was buried on the Muskoday reserve.

== Legacy ==
Chief John Smith's most lasting legacy is the First Nation that he founded, which for many decades bore his own name. The John Smith First Nation continued under that name well into the 20th century. In 1993, the band officially changed its name to the Muskoday First Nation (from the Cree word maskotêw, referring to the prairie terrain; it has been translated as meaning “grassy plain” or “bare (treeless) prairie”), part of a revival of Indigenous place names and identity.

John Smith's role as a Treaty 6 signatory is an important part of Muskoday's heritage and of Treaty 6 history. He was one of the Indigenous leaders who ensured that his people entered into a formal agreement with the Crown, the effects of which persist to this day. However, the fulfillment of Treaty 6 was fraught with challenges. According to Muskoday oral tradition, Chief Smith had initially requested a reserve measuring roughly six miles by six miles (36 square miles) for his band, reflecting their desire for ample land to farm and hunt. The reserve as surveyed in 1876 was smaller than this aspiration, and over time it became clear that the band had not received all the land to which they were entitled under the treaty's formula (which allowed one square mile per family of five). This led the Muskoday First Nation to file a Treaty Land Entitlement (TLE) claim in the late 20th century, seeking redress for the shortfall in land. The claim was successful: in the 2000s, Canada and Saskatchewan reached a settlement with Muskoday, providing compensation and the opportunity for the First Nation to acquire additional reserve lands to fulfill the treaty promise.

Today Muskoday First Nation is a thriving community that remembers Chief John Smith as its progenitor. He is recognized for guiding his people through the transition to reserve life and laying the foundations for self-sufficiency. The First Nation's achievements in areas such as agriculture (it was the first reserve in Saskatchewan to ratify its own Land Code in 1998, regaining control over land management) are part of the ongoing legacy of initiative and self-determination that traces back to Chief Smith's era.

Smith also ensured the perpetual continuance of the original Saint James Anglican Church (and later two other consecrated churches) by allocating a portion of the surrounding land lease revenues for the rest of time (120 acres), to ensure that spiritual and burial needs are forever met for membership and those requesting burial at the adjoining cemetery grounds.

== See also ==
- Muskoday First Nation
