= Echo Bay, Saskatchewan =

Echo Bay
- Resort village
- Resort Village of Echo Bay
- Location within Saskatchewan
- Coordinates: 53.212°N 107.127°W
- Country: Canada
- Province: Saskatchewan
- Census division: 16
- Rural municipality: RM of Spiritwood No. 496
- Incorporated: August 1, 1982

Government
  - Mayor: Joe Tindall
  - Governing body: Resort Village Council
  - Administrator: Tara Bueckert

Area (2016)
  - Land: 0.8 km^{2} (0.31 sq mi)

Population (2016)
  - Total: 40
  - Density: 50/km^{2} (130/sq mi)
- Time zone: CST
  - Summer (DST): CST
- Area codes: 306 and 639
- Waterway(s): Shell Lake

Echo Bay (2016 population: 40) is a resort village in the Canadian province of Saskatchewan within Census Division No. 16. It is on the shores of Big Shell Lake in the Rural Municipality of Spiritwood No. 496.

== History ==
Echo Bay incorporated as a resort village on August 1, 1982.

== Demographics ==
Population history (1981–2016)
Year	Pop.	±%
1981		—
1986	22	—
1991	4	−81.8%
1996	9	+125.0%
2001	24	+166.7%
2006	77	+220.8%
2011	38	−50.6%
2016	40	+5.3%
Source: Statistics Canada via Saskatchewan Bureau of Statistics

In the 2021 Census of Population conducted by Statistics Canada, Echo Bay had a population of 68 living in 40 of its 145 total private dwellings, a change of 70% from its 2016 population of 40. With a land area of 0.74 km^{2} (0.29 sq mi), it had a population density of 91.9/km^{2} (238.0/sq mi) in 2021.

In the 2016 Census of Population conducted by Statistics Canada, the Resort Village of Echo Bay recorded a population of 40 living in 20 of its 143 total private dwellings, a 5.3% change from its 2011 population of 38. With a land area of 0.8 km^{2} (0.31 sq mi), it had a population density of 50.0/km^{2} (129.5/sq mi) in 2016.

== Government ==
The Resort Village of Echo Bay is governed by an elected municipal council and an appointed administrator that meets on the second Saturday of every month. The mayor is Joe Tindall and its administrator is Tara Bueckert.

== See also ==
- List of communities in Saskatchewan
- List of municipalities in Saskatchewan
- List of resort villages in Saskatchewan
- List of villages in Saskatchewan
- List of summer villages in Alberta
