= Big Shell Lake =

Lake in Saskatchewan, Canada

- Location in Saskatchewan Big Shell Lake (Canada)
- Location: RM of Spiritwood No. 496, Saskatchewan
- Coordinates: 53.2257°N 107.1724°W
- Part of: Saskatchewan River drainage basin
- River sources: Thickwood Hills
- Primary outflows: Shell River
- Basin countries: Canada
- Surface area: 668.6 ha (1,652 acres)
- Max. depth: 15.1 m (50 ft)
- Shore length^{1}: 21 km (13 mi)
- Surface elevation: 578 m (1,896 ft)
- Settlements: Big Shell; Echo Bay
- ^{1} Shore length is not a well-defined measure.

Big Shell Lake is a lake in the Canadian province of Saskatchewan. Officially known as Shell Lake, it is commonly called "Big" Shell Lake to differentiate it from Little Shell Lake, which is about 4.5 kilometres (2.8 mi) downstream. Big Shell Lake is in the RM of Spiritwood No. 496 and the resort villages of Big Shell and Echo Bay are on the south-eastern and eastern shore. Access to the lake and the villages is from Highway 12.

Big Shell Lake is the source of Shell River (formerly 'Shell Brook'). The lake's main inflow begins in the Thickwood Hills and flows east into the south-western corner of the lake.

== Big Shell Lake Recreation Site ==
Big Shell Lake Recreation Site (53.1991°N 107.1381°W) is a provincial recreation site on the north-west corner of the lake. The park has a dock, boat launch, and a campground with 12 full-service campsites, two electrified sites, and one tenting site.

== Fish species ==
Fish commonly found in the lake include burbot, northern pike, and walleye.

== See also ==
- List of lakes of Saskatchewan
- Tourism in Saskatchewan
