= Mont Nebo =

Hamlet in Saskatchewan, Canada

Coordinates: 53.170°N 106.505°W

Location of Mont Nebo in Saskatchewan

Mont Nebo is a hamlet in the Canadian province of Saskatchewan. Access is from Highway 3.

== See also ==
- List of communities in Saskatchewan
