= Big River 118A =

Indian reserve in Saskatchewan, Canada

Coordinates: 53°27′49″N 107°02′50″W

- Indian reserve
- Big River Indian Reserve No. 118A
- Location in Saskatchewan
- First Nation: Big River
- Country: Canada
- Province: Saskatchewan

Area
  - Total: 393 ha (970 acres)

Big River 118A is an Indian reserve of the Big River First Nation in Saskatchewan.

== See also ==
- List of Indian reserves in Saskatchewan
