= Rural Municipality of Canwood No. 494 =

Rural municipality in Saskatchewan, Canada

Canwood No. 494 Thompson No. 494 (1913–1916)
- Rural municipality
- Rural Municipality of Canwood No. 494
- Location of the RM of Canwood No. 494 in Saskatchewan
- Coordinates: 53.457°N 106.830°W
- Country: Canada
- Province: Saskatchewan
- Census division: 16
- SARM division: 5
- Formed: January 1, 1913
- Name change: April 29, 1916 (from RM of Thompson No. 494)

Government
  - Reeve: Lyndon Pease
  - Governing body: RM of Canwood No. 494 Council
  - Administrator: Lorna Benson
  - Office location: Canwood

Area (2021)
  - Land: 1,919.39 km^{2} (741.08 sq mi)

Population (2021)
  - Total: 1,351
  - Density: 0.7/km^{2} (1.8/sq mi)
- Time zone: CST
  - Summer (DST): CST
- Area codes: 306 and 639

The Rural Municipality of Canwood No. 494 (2021 population: 1,351) is a rural municipality (RM) in the Canadian province of Saskatchewan within Census Division No. 16 and SARM Division No. 5. The RM is located in the north-central portion of the province, west of the city of Prince Albert.

== History ==
The RM of Thompson No. 494 was originally incorporated as a rural municipality on January 1, 1913. Its name was changed to the RM of Canwood No. 494 on April 29, 1916.

== Geography ==
The RM is bordered to the north by the RM of Big River No. 555, to the northeast by Prince Albert National Park, to the west by the RM of Spiritwood No. 496, to the south by the RM of Leask No. 464, and to the east by the RM of Shellbrook No. 493.

=== Communities and localities ===
The following urban municipalities are surrounded by the RM.

Towns

- Canwood

Villages

- Debden

The following unincorporated communities are within the RM.

Localities

- Hawkeye
- Mont Nebo
- Ordale
- Pebble Baye
- Stump Lake
- Victoire
- Wrixen

The RM completely and partially surrounds the Indian reserves of Ahtahkakoop 104 and Mistawasis 103 respectively.

== Canwood Regional Park ==
Canwood Regional Park (53.3647°N 106.5457°W) is set in a forest of jack pines and is located about 5 kilometres (3.1 mi) east of the village of Canwood. Initial development of the park began in 1959 and, in 1961, it became a regional park. The park has a golf course, a campground, picnic area, ball diamonds, and hiking trails.

The campground has 20 electrified campsites, potable water, and a washroom and shower facility. The campground is central to the other amenities of the park.

Canwood Regional Park Golf Club is a 9-hole, grass greens golf course with a clubhouse, which is open daily for concession and meals, a pro shop, and two tees per hole. It is a par 35 course with white tees totalling 2,885 yards and red tees totalling 2,625.

== Demographics ==
Population history (1981–2021)
Year	Pop.	±%
1981	2,162	—
1986	1,968	−9.0%
1991	1,811	−8.0%
1996	1,718	−5.1%
2001	1,720	+0.1%
2006	1,535	−10.8%
2011	1,424	−7.2%
2016	1,381	−3.0%
2021	1,351	−2.2%
Source: Statistics Canada via Saskatchewan Bureau of Statistics

In the 2021 Census of Population conducted by Statistics Canada, the RM of Canwood No. 494 had a population of 1,351 living in 576 of its 808 total private dwellings, a change of −2.2% from its 2016 population of 1,381. With a land area of 1,919.39 km^{2} (741.08 sq mi), it had a population density of 0.7/km^{2} (1.8/sq mi) in 2021.

In the 2016 Census of Population, the RM of Canwood No. 494 recorded a population of 1,381 living in 565 of its 777 total private dwellings, a −3% change from its 2011 population of 1,424. With a land area of 1,945.2 km^{2} (751.0 sq mi), it had a population density of 0.7/km^{2} (1.8/sq mi) in 2016.

== Transportation ==
Rail

The Canwood RM area is currently serviced by the Carlton Trail Railway, a shortline of the Canadian National Railway.

Roads

- Highway 793—serves Debden and Victoire
- Highway 55—serves Debden, Polwarth and Canwood
- Highway 694—intersects Highway 55 south of Polwarth

== Government ==
The RM of Canwood No. 494 is governed by an elected municipal council and an appointed administrator that meets on the third Tuesday of every month. The reeve of the RM is Lyndon Pease while its administrator is Lorna Benson. The RM's office is located in Canwood.

== See also ==
- List of rural municipalities in Saskatchewan
