= Debden, Saskatchewan =

Village in Saskatchewan, Canada

Debden
- Village
- Village of Debden
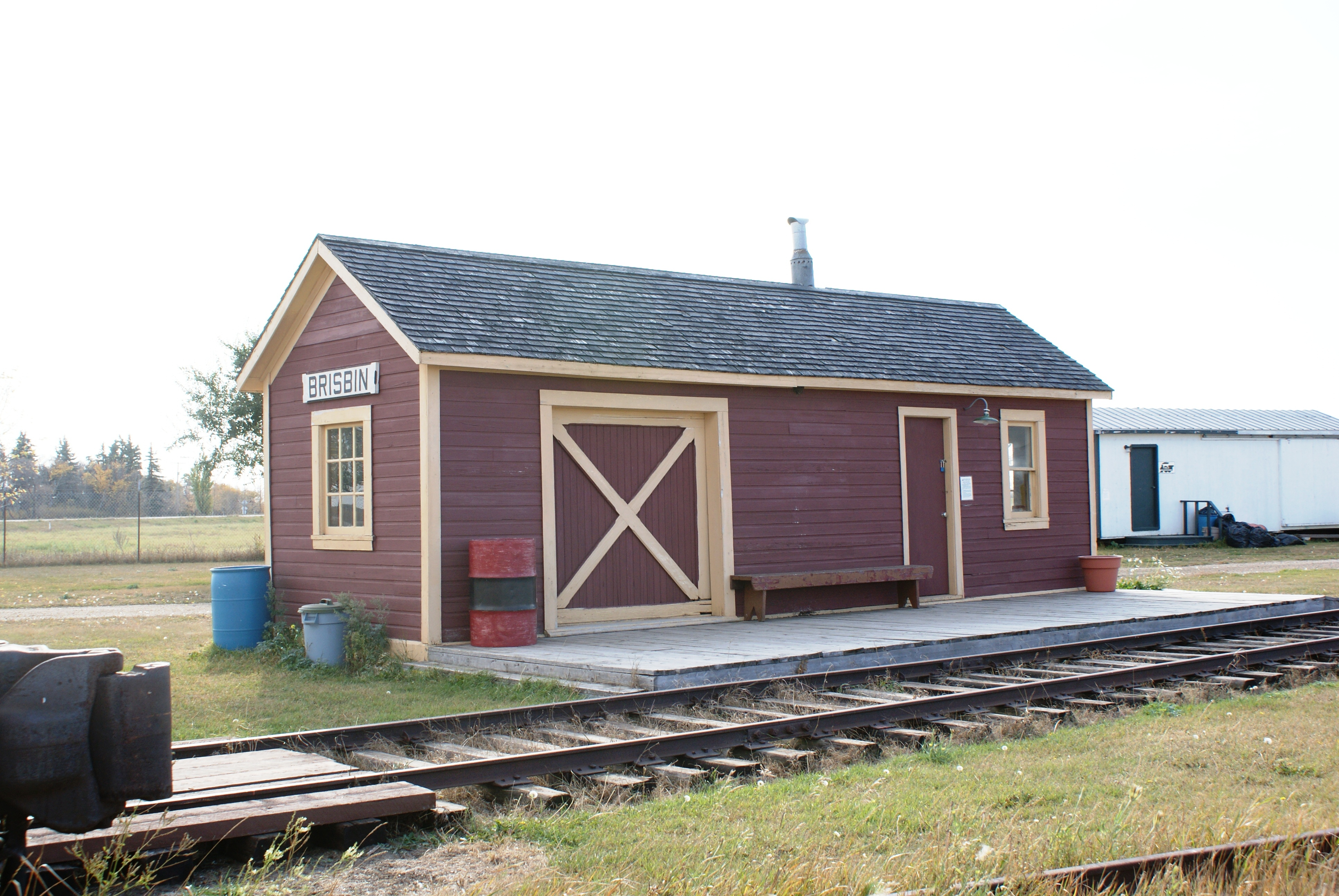
- Canadian Northern Railway Debden Portable Train Station later used in Brisbin, Saskatchewan

- Location within Saskatchewan Location within Canada
- Coordinates: 53.517°N 106.867°W
- Country: Canada
- Province: Saskatchewan
- Region: Central
- Census division: 16
- Rural municipality: Canwood No. 494
- Post office Founded: 1912
- Incorporated (Village): 1922

Government
  - Type: Municipal
  - Governing body: Debden Village Council
  - Mayor: Rod Fisher
  - Administrator: Tamara Couture

Area
  - Total: 1.39 km^{2} (0.54 sq mi)

Population (2016)
  - Total: 337
  - Density: 242.5/km^{2} (628/sq mi)
- Time zone: UTC-6 (CST)
- Postal code: S0J 0S0
- Area code: 306
- Highways: Highway 55
- Railways: Canadian National Railway

Debden (2016 population: 337) is a village in the Canadian province of Saskatchewan within the Rural Municipality of Canwood No. 494 and Census Division No. 16. The village is located on Highway 55 and is 94 kilometres (58 mi) from the city of Prince Albert and 194 kilometres (121 mi) from the city of Saskatoon. It is also the administrative headquarters of the Big River First Nation band government. The village is at the edge of the Prince Albert National Park and with all the lakes nearby it becomes a popular area in the summer months.

== History ==
Debden incorporated as a village on June 7, 1922.

== Demographics ==
Population history (1981–2016)
Year	Pop.	±%
1981	403	—
1986	423	+5.0%
1991	416	−1.7%
1996	423	+1.7%
2001	355	−16.1%
2006	348	−2.0%
2011	358	+2.9%
2016	337	−5.9%
Source: Statistics Canada via Saskatchewan Bureau of Statistics

In the 2021 Census of Population conducted by Statistics Canada, Debden had a population of 327 living in 132 of its 151 total private dwellings, a change of −3% from its 2016 population of 337. With a land area of 1.34 km^{2} (0.52 sq mi), it had a population density of 244.0/km^{2} (632.0/sq mi) in 2021.

In the 2016 Census of Population, the Village of Debden recorded a population of 337 living in 132 of its 148 total private dwellings, a −6.2% change from its 2011 population of 358. With a land area of 1.39 km^{2} (0.54 sq mi), it had a population density of 242.4/km^{2} (627.9/sq mi) in 2016.

== Notable people ==
- Fred Sasakamoose, NHL player, first Indigenous NHL player

== See also ==
- List of communities in Saskatchewan
- List of francophone communities in Saskatchewan
- List of villages in Saskatchewan
