= Big River 118 =

Indian reserve in Saskatchewan, Canada

Coordinates: 53°35′05″N 107°09′20″W

- Indian reserve
- Big River Indian Reserve No. 118
- Location in Saskatchewan
- First Nation: Big River
- Country: Canada
- Province: Saskatchewan

Area
  - Total: 11,571.8 ha (28,595 acres)

Population (2016)
  - Total: 1,553
  - Density: 13.42/km^{2} (34.76/sq mi)
- Community Well-Being Index: 46

Big River 118 is an Indian reserve of the Big River First Nation in Saskatchewan. It is 98 kilometres northwest of Prince Albert. In the 2016 Canadian Census, it recorded a population of 1553 living in 366 of its 407 total private dwellings. In the same year, its Community Well-Being index was calculated at 46 of 100, compared to 58.4 for the average First Nations community and 77.5 for the average non-Indigenous community.

== See also ==
- List of Indian reserves in Saskatchewan
