= Hagen, Saskatchewan =

Hamlet in Saskatchewan, Canada

Hagen
- Hamlet
- Location within Saskatchewan
- Coordinates: 52°56′13″N 105°33′23″W
- Country: Canada
- Province: Saskatchewan
- Census division: No. 15

Population (2006)
  - Total: 39
- Time zone: UTC-6 (CST)
- Postal code: S0J

Hagen is a hamlet in the Canadian province of Saskatchewan. Access is from Highway 25.

The Royal Canadian Air Force RCAF constructed a Relief Aerodrome near the town sometime before or during the early years of the Second World War. Information on this aerodrome can be found in the article Hagen Aerodrome.

== Demographics ==
In the 2021 Census of Population conducted by Statistics Canada, Hagen had a population of 25 living in 11 of its 13 total private dwellings, a change of −21.9% from its 2016 population of 32. With a land area of 0.19 km^{2} (0.073 sq mi), it had a population density of 131.6/km^{2} (340.8/sq mi) in 2021.

== See also ==
- List of communities in Saskatchewan
