= Shellbrook, Saskatchewan =

Town in Saskatchewan, Canada

Shellbrook
- Town
- Shellbrook Shellbrook (Canada)
- Coordinates: 53°13′13″N 106°23′19″W
- Country: Canada
- Province: Saskatchewan
- Rural municipality: Shellbrook No. 493
- Settled: 1882
- Village: 1909
- Town: 1948

Government
  - Mayor: Jason Good
  - MLA Rosthern-Shellbrook: Scott Moe

Area
  - Town: 3.67 km^{2} (1.42 sq mi)
  - Metro: 5,230 km^{2} (2,018 sq mi)

Population
  - Town: 1,444
  - Density: 390.3/km^{2} (1,011/sq mi)
- Time zone: UTC−06:00 (CST)
  - Summer (DST): UTC−05:00 (CDT)
- Postal code: S0J 2E0
- Area code: 306
- Highways: Hwy 3, Hwy 40, Hwy 55
- Website: Official Website

Shellbrook is a town in Saskatchewan, Canada, about 44.5 kilometres (27.7 mi) west of Prince Albert. The population of the town was 1,433 in 2011. Highways 3, 40, and 55 provide access to the community. Approximately 50 businesses provide a wide range of goods, services, and professional expertise.

== History ==
Settlers began arriving in the area in the late 19th century and, in 1894, a post office named after the Shell Brook was established. Larger numbers of settlers began to arrive in the district in the early 20th century, with significant representation from people of British and Scandinavian origins. In 1910, the Canadian Northern Railway reached Shellbrook from Prince Albert and the community developed as a service centre for the surrounding agricultural region.

== Geography ==
The Shell River, formerly known as Shell Brook, passes just to the north of the present community, flowing east to the Sturgeon River, which in turn flows into the North Saskatchewan River west of Prince Albert. The community is situated near the northern edge of agricultural settlement in the transition zone between the aspen parkland and boreal forest biomes and as the early settlers arrived the land had to be cleared of the jack pine forests before crops could be planted. The trees, however, provided an early cash crop and logs were rafted into Prince Albert where many were converted into railway ties.

== Demographics ==
In the 2021 Census of Population conducted by Statistics Canada, Shellbrook had a population of 1,510 living in 674 of its 710 total private dwellings, a change of 4.6% from its 2016 population of 1,444. With a land area of 3.93 km^{2} (1.52 sq mi), it had a population density of 384.2/km^{2} (995.1/sq mi) in 2021.

Canada census – Shellbrook, Saskatchewan community profile

	2011
Population	1,433 (+16.5% from 2006)
Land area	3.67 km^{2} (1.42 sq mi)
Population density	390.3/km^{2} (1,011/sq mi)
Median age	45.3 (M: 41.4, F: 48.0)
Private dwellings	662 (total)
Median household income

References: 2011

== Attractions ==
The town has a library, and a museum located in the former Canadian Northern Railway station built in 1909. The town's golf course is rated as one of the finest in the province. Additionally, Prince Albert National Park is just a short drive north of the community and there are seven Regional Parks and numerous lakes in the district, accommodating fishing, swimming, boating, and camping.

== Notable people ==
- Author James Sinclair Ross was born in the Wild Rose School District just northeast of Shellbrook in 1908.
- Curling champion Marliese Miller (Kasner) is a resident of Shellbrook.
- Scott Moe — 15th and current Premier of Saskatchewan

== See also ==
- List of towns in Saskatchewan
- List of francophone communities in Saskatchewan
- Shellbrook Airport
