= Victoire, Saskatchewan =

Community in Saskatchewan, Canada

Coordinates: 53.497°N 107.050°W

Victoire is a populated locality in the Canadian province of Saskatchewan near the eastern shore of Morin Lake. Nearby towns include Ormeaux (4.2 km), Pascal (7.6 km), and Eldred (11.3 km).

Victoire is found within the 306 area code.

== See also ==
- List of communities in Saskatchewan
