= Belinda Daniels =

Canadian educator and Cree language activist

Dr. Belinda kakiyosēw Daniels

Academic background
- Education: University of Saskatchewan
- Thesis: ē-kakwē nēhiyaw pimātisiyān ōta nīkihk – The Lifelong Journey Home (2021)
- Doctoral advisor: Dr. Debbie Pushor

Academic work
- Discipline: Indigenous Language Revitalization, Education, Anthropology, History

Belinda kakiyosēw Daniels is a nēhiyaw Canadian educator and language activist known for efforts to teach and revitalize nēhiyawēwin.

== Early life and education ==
Daniels is a member of Sturgeon Lake First Nation, SK and was raised by her grandparents. She grew up hearing nēhiyawēwin Cree spoken but was not encouraged to speak the language. Her grandparents were forced to attend residential schools and didn't want her to experience the same type of punishment and ridicule they had for speaking an Indigenous language. Daniels was inspired to learn nēhiyawēwin Cree while working as an administrative assistance at a high school where others spoke the language.

Daniels completed an interdisciplinary PhD at the University of Saskatchewan in 2021. Her thesis ē-kakwē nēhiyaw pimātisiyān ōta nīkihk – The Lifelong Journey Home was supervised by Debbie Pushor.

== Career ==
Daniels teaches at the University of Victoria in the department of Indigenous education. She previously taught for nine years at Mount Royal Collegiate in Saskatoon, and at two universities, University of Alberta for their CILLDI program known as the Canadian Indigenous Language and Literacy Development Institute and at University of Saskatchewan, the non-credit Languages Department.

In 2003 Daniels started a Cree summer camp where attendees came to learn and practice speaking the language. The idea for the camp came out of Daniels' Master of Education Project and out of raising her own family, and half heartedly, the frustration with the absence of a Cree language immersion program in the province. The nēhiyawak Summer Language Program runs in different parts of Saskatchewan each year and by 2017 had expanded to 27 people (11 speakers and 16 participants) from a total of 5 people when the camp first launched. In 2020 she explained why she views the relearning of an Indigenous languages is important to the CBC: "When we reclaim our language, we reclaim who we are and we reinstate that we belong here. So, language is practicing sovereignty." Since, 2017 the summer annual nēhiyawak language experience camp has grown, the numbers of participants are between 25-50, depending on space, and nLE now has a children's camp. nLE now offers online classes and face-to-face programming, like MAP. Master apprentice/mentee program and practice speaking and listening classes.

== Awards ==
- Outstanding Canadian Aboriginal Educator Award (2015)
- U of S’s Graduate Aboriginal Research Excellence Award (2015)
- Global Teacher Prize - Top 50 Finalist (2016)
- Federation of Sovereign Indigenous Nations’ Strength of Our Women Award in Education (2016)
- Lieutenant Governor Heritage Saskatchewan Award for Community Development, Regina. SK (2018)
- Nominated for Federation of Sovereign Indigenous Nations’ Strength of Our Women Award in Language and Culture (2021)

== Select publications ==
- Daniels, Belinda; Sterzuk, Andrea (7 March 2022). "Indigenous Language Revitalization and Applied Linguistics: Conceptualizing an Ethical Space of Engagement Between Academic Fields". Canadian Journal of Applied Linguistics. 25 (1): 1–18. doi:10.37213/cjal.2022.31841. hdl:10294/15502. S2CID 247312576.
- Daniels, Belinda; Sterzuk, Andrea (31 March 2020). "Teresa L. McCarty, Sheilah E. Nicholas and Gillian Wigglesworth. Editors. (2019) A World of Indigenous Languages: Politics, Pedagogies and Prospects for Language Reclamation". Journal of Immersion and Content-Based Language Education. 8 (1): 141–144. doi:10.1075/jicb.19024.dan. S2CID 216513684.
- Herman, Cheryle; Daniels, Belinda; Lewis, Kevin; Koole, Marguerite (2020). "Awakening sleeping languages in Saskatchewan with culturally appropriate curricula and technology". In Traxler, John; Crompton, Helen (eds.). Critical mobile pedagogy : cases of digital technologies and learners at the margins. New York: Routledge. ISBN 9780429537165.
- Daniels, Belinda C. (2 July 2014). "A Whisper of True Learning". LEARNing Landscapes. 7 (2): 101–114. doi:10.36510/learnland.v7i2.653.

For more about language camps or bringing language in the home see: https://nehiyawak.org
