= Muskoday Reserve =

Indian reserve in Saskatchewan, Canada

Coordinates: 53°05′34″N 105°29′24″W

- Indian reserve
- Muskoday First Nation Reserve
- Location in Saskatchewan
- First Nation: Muskoday
- Country: Canada
- Province: Saskatchewan

Area
  - Total: 9,713.9 ha (24,004 acres)

Population (2016)
  - Total: 647
  - Density: 6.66/km^{2} (17.3/sq mi)
- Community Well-Being Index: 64

The Muskoday Reserve is an Indian reserve of the Muskoday First Nation in Saskatchewan. It is about 19 kilometres (12 mi) south-east of Prince Albert. In the 2016 Canadian Census, it recorded a population of 647 living in 205 of its 217 total private dwellings. In the same year, its Community Well-Being index was calculated at 64 of 100, compared to 58.4 for the average First Nations community and 77.5 for the average non-Indigenous community.

== See also ==
- List of Indian reserves in Saskatchewan
