= Brancepeth, Saskatchewan =

Hamlet in Saskatchewan, Canada

Coordinates: 53°00′09″N 105°15′38″W

Brancepeth is a hamlet in Saskatchewan, Canada. Access is from Highway 3.

The community is named for Brancepeth, County Durham, England.

== Demographics ==
In the 2021 Census of Population conducted by Statistics Canada, Brancepeth had a population of 20 living in 12 of its 12 total private dwellings, a change of -42.9% from its 2016 population of 35. With a land area of 0.2 km^{2} (0.077 sq mi), it had a population density of 100.0/km^{2} (259.0/sq mi) in 2021.

== See also ==
- List of communities in Saskatchewan
