= Birch Hills =

Town in Saskatchewan, Canada

- Town
- Location of Birch Hills Birch Hills (Canada)
- Coordinates: 52.983333°N 105.433333°W
- Country: Canada
- Province: Saskatchewan
- Census division: 15
- Rural municipality: Birch Hills No. 460
- Post office established: 1895
- Incorporated (Village): 1907
- Incorporated (Town): 1960

Government
  - Mayor: Stewart Adams
  - Town Manager: Tara Gariepy
  - Governing body: Town council

Area
  - Total: 2.27 km^{2} (0.88 sq mi)

Population (2011)
  - Total: 1,064
  - Density: 468.4/km^{2} (1,213/sq mi)
- Time zone: CST
- Postal code: S0J 0G0
- Area code: 306
- Highways: Highway 3
- Website: birchhills.ca

Birch Hills is a town located in Saskatchewan, Canada. It is southeast of Prince Albert and the reserve of Muskoday First Nation. Directly to the west is the village of St. Louis, and to the east is Kinistino. It is surrounded by, but not part of, the Rural Municipality of Birch Hills No. 460.

The community takes its name from hills in the area, which were once heavily treed with birches that were used in manufacturing birch bark canoes during the fur trade era of the 18th century. The countryside around Birch Hills is part of the aspen parkland biome.

== History ==
Situated in an area settled primarily by Norwegian, British, and Anglo-Metis peoples, Birch Hills became a village in 1907 and reached town status in 1960. Unlike many other agriculturally based towns, it continues to grow due to its position as a satellite community of Prince Albert.

== Demographics ==
In the 2021 Census of Population conducted by Statistics Canada, Birch Hills had a population of 1,066 living in 450 of its 475 total private dwellings, a change of 3.2% from its 2016 population of 1,033. With a land area of 2.39 km^{2} (0.92 sq mi), it had a population density of 446.0/km^{2} (1,155.2/sq mi) in 2021.

Canada census – Birch Hills community profile

	2021	2011
Population	1,066 (+3.2% from 2016)	1,064 (+13.8% from 2006)
Land area	2.39 km^{2} (0.92 sq mi)	2.27 km^{2} (0.88 sq mi)
Population density	446.6/km^{2} (1,157/sq mi)	468.4/km^{2} (1,213/sq mi)
Median age	41.6 (M: 38.4, F: 44.0)	42.1 (M: 40.2, F: 43.9)
Private dwellings	475 (total) 450 (occupied)	440 (total)
Median household income	$78,500

References: 2021 2011

== Transportation ==
- Birch Hills Airport – Municipal airport
- Highway 3
- Highway 25

== Notable people ==
- Earl Thomson won a gold medal for Canada at the 1920 Olympics in the 110-metre hurdles.
- Marshall Johnston was an NHL player, scout, coach, and general manager. He is currently the Director of Professional Scouting for the Carolina Hurricanes.
- John Richard Parish Taylor, politician

== See also ==
- List of towns in Saskatchewan
