= Muskoday First Nation =

First Nation band government in Saskatchewan, Canada

- Band No. 371
- ᒪᐢᑯᑌᐤ maskotêw
- People: Cree; Saulteaux
- Treaty: Treaty 6
- Headquarters: Muskoday
- Province: Saskatchewan

Land
- Main reserve: Muskoday Reserve
- Reserves: Muskoday 99A; Muskoday 99B
- Land area: 102.856 km^{2} (39.713 sq mi)

Population (2019)
- On reserve: 624
- Off reserve: 1318
- Total population: 1942

Government
- Chief: Ronald M Bear
- Council: Herman Crain, Beryl Bear, Ted Bear, Merle Crain, Elaine Ross

Tribal Council
- Saskatoon Tribal Council

Website
- muskodayfn.ca

The Muskoday First Nation (Cree: ᒪᐢᑯᑌᐤ, maskotêw, formerly the John Smith First Nation) is a First Nation band government in Saskatchewan, Canada, composed of Cree and Saulteaux peoples. The First Nation has a registered population of 1,828 people as of September 2014, of which approximately 623 members of the First Nation live on-reserve, and approximately 1204 live off-reserve. Muskoday's territory is located in the aspen parkland biome. It is bordered by the rural municipalities of Birch Hills No. 460 and Prince Albert No. 461.

== Background ==
The First Nation's land was settled after Chief John Smith of a Cree and Saulteaux band who were originally from the Saint Peter's Reserve (this was near Selkirk, Manitoba and was dissolved, with the remainder of the band today comprising the Peguis First Nation in Manitoba) settled along the South Saskatchewan River in the 1870s. Chief Smith signed onto Treaty Six at Fort Carlton in 1876 making the settlement legally an Indian reserve.

The reserve and First Nation was initially named after their Chief John Smith, who was a brother of Chief James Smith, the founder of the James Smith First Nation. Also during the late 19th century, James Isbister served for a period as a farm instructor at Muskoday.

== History ==
- 1800s - Hereditary Chief, John Smith, settled along the South Saskatchewan River.
- 1800s - Day school established.
- 1860s - Farming established.
- 1870s - Farming expands to include a 150 head cattle herd.
- 1876 - August 19, John Smith signed Treaty 6 at Fort Carlton, resulting in the creation of the John Smith Indian Reserve.
- early 1900s - First Church in Muskoday.
- 1914 - 1918 - Loss of land claim in Candle Lake.
- 1924 - Chief John Smith dies.
- 1930s - First car on Muskoday (John Bird).
- 1930s - First sports day.
- 1947 - First elected Chief
- 1951 - Permit established (Indian Act revised).
- 1951 - First Government House.
- Early 1960s - First Band office opened.
- 1963 - Muskoday Band farm is developed.
- 1967 - Gardiner Dam is constructed on Saskatchewan River.
- 1967 - Opening of Muskoday kindergarten.
- 1968 - Residential schools taken over by INAC.
- 1968 - First colour television in Muskoday (Napoleon Bear).
- 1969 - The White Paper (amendment to Indian Act).
- 1969 - Highway 3 is paved.
- 1969 - First convenience store (Cecil Bear 1969-1976).
- 1970 - Official opening of bridge.
- 1971 - First Pow wow (located where the village is now).
- 1972 - Telephone service into Muskoday.
- 1973 - Running water service in Muskoday)
- 1973 - First Pow wow arbor built (first in Canada).
- 1976 - First Muskoday health clinic.
- 1980 - First village established.
- 1981 - Convenience store and gas station (David Knight until 1991).
- 1982 - Saskatoon Tribal Council (STC) established.
- 1984 - Fire Hall built (one of the first in Canada).
- 1985 - Bill C-31.
- 1987 - Official opening of Muskoday daycare.
- 1989 - Official opening of Water Treatment Plant.
- 1990 - Second Pow wow arbor built.
- 1991 - Convenience store is Band owned.
- 1993 - The John Smith/Muskoday Reserve have its name officially changed to Muskoday First Nation.
- 1993 - First Muskoday official flag.
- 1993 - Opening of Muskoday post office.
- 1994-1997 - Convenience store in village (Louis Bear).
- 1997 - Return to Buffalo (17 head) farming.
- 1997 - Switch to Financial Transfer Agreement (FTA) from Alternate Funding Arrangement (AFA).
- 1998 - Muskoday ratifies Land Code.
- 1999 - First market garden.
- 1999 - Restoration of trees.
- 1999 - Cultural grounds established on Crossing Island.
- 1999-2000 - Water piped from Prince Albert.
- 2000 - Official opening of restaurant/café.
- 2004 - Muskoday files TLE Land Claim.
- 2004 - Muskoday Organic Growers Co-op formed.
- 2006 - Official opening of Muskoday Community School.
- 2007 - Muskoday ratifies TLE settlement.
- 2008 - Comprehensive community-based planning group established.
- 2009 - Third Pow wow arbor built.
- 2009 - New church.
- 2009 - Muskoday Community Plan developed by Faculty of Architecture and Planning, Dalhousie University.
- 2013 - Muskoday's first Treaty Land Entitlement (TLE) selections receive reserve status (Muskoday #99A and #99B).
- 2013 - Co-hosted the 2013 Saskatchewan First Nation Summer Games with Birch Hills and Prince Albert.
- 2015 - Muskoday awarded Vision in Planning Award from the Canadian Institute of Planners for its continued work on the Land Code and Land Use Plan.
- 2015 - First Land Code community in Canada to successfully complete a land exchange with a neighboring municipality.
- 2016 - Muskoday Trespass Law passed by Chief and Council.
- 2021 - Muskoday elects Chief Ava Bear, first female chief of Muskoday First Nation.

During the 1970s, the John Smith First Nation became the Muskoday First Nation. During the same period as the First Nation's name change, a highway was completed through the reserve that linked the town of Birch Hills with Prince Albert. The Muskoday Bridge was then built over the South Saskatchewan River, which divides the reserve lands roughly in half. The original band office was built in July 1978.

Unlike many other Cree Nations in the area, in the 19th and 20th century the reserve was almost entirely Anglican, with no Roman Catholic influence. Traditional spirituality and practices remained strong, however. Today, the two church congregations serving the Muskoday First Nation are St. James Anglican Church and the Muskoday Baptist Church.

== Governance ==
The Muskoday First Nation have an Act Electoral System for determining their elected leaders. The current leadership consists of Chief Ava Bear (Muskoday's first ever female Chief) and five councillors: Clayton Bear, Merle Crain, Beryl Bear, Tracy Bear and Delbert Bear. Their two-year elected term began on 2021.

The First Nation is affiliated with the Saskatoon Tribal Council, along with six other First Nations. The Saskatoon Tribal Council was established on February 23, 1982, as an institution to assist the individual and collective governments of the First Nations in the Saskatoon area. In their mission statement, the Saskatoon Tribal Council states that they strive "...to maintain the social, economic and political bases of the First Nations represented herein, including their rights to land, resources, culture, language, self-government and self-determination." The statement continues with "The Saskatoon Tribal Council is desirous of obtaining and achieving co-operation and understanding between First Nation and non-First Nation citizens within represented First Nation territories and with Canada generally."

== Services ==
Muskoday First Nation government have several services made available to their peoples. In 1997 the First Nation designed a Land Code to manage its own lands, rather than have them managed by the federal Government of Canada. This led the way for further developing services available to its people. These services include a housing development affectionately known as "the village" by the community, water plant, community health center, administration building and band hall.

In 2005, the Muskoday First Nation completed the construction of its own Kindergarten to Grade 9 school. Other services include the Muskoday Awasis Daycare/Headstart Center, Muskoday Volunteer Fire Department and the Muskoday Development Corporation.

In addition to these government services, the community houses a gas bar, a convenience store, and a post office.

== Reserve ==
The First Nation has reserved for itself the 9,686.8 hectares (23,936.6 acres) Muskoday First Nation Reserve (formerly the Muskoday 99 Indian Reserve), an Indian reserve located approximately 19 km southeast of the city of Prince Albert. The community of the Muskoday First Nation is located on this reserve at the following coordinates (53°05′12″N 105°31′32″W).

Like many of the First Nations of Canada, Muskoday First Nation are engaged in ongoing discussions, agreements and lobby efforts with the federal Government of Canada; land ownership and entitlement are at the core in these efforts. At the time of the signing of Treaty 6, the incorrect amount of land was reserved for the Muskoday. This led to Muskoday First Nation to submit a Treaty Land Entitlement (TLE) claim. The discrepancy was identified as 6,144 acres (2,486.4 hectares). The TLE claim was approved and on May 23, 2007, Muskoday members voted overwhelmingly to ratify the TLE settlement. The amount of the TLE will be approximately $10,300,000.00, which will be paid to Muskoday over a period of 5 years. To satisfy the conditions of the TLE claim process, Muskoday must purchase at least 6,144 acres (24.86 km^{2}) during that 5-year period.

== See also ==
- Davis, Saskatchewan
- James Smith First Nation
- Peguis First Nation
