= Rural Municipality of Shellbrook No. 493 =

Rural municipality in Saskatchewan, Canada

Shellbrook No. 493 Rozilee No. 493 (1913–1923)
- Rural municipality
- Rural Municipality of Shellbrook No. 493
- Location of the RM of Shellbrook No. 493 in Saskatchewan
- Coordinates: 53.347°N 106.164°W
- Country: Canada
- Province: Saskatchewan
- Census division: 16
- SARM division: 5
- Formed: January 1, 1913
- Name change: October 20, 1923 (from RM of Rozilee No. 493)

Government
  - Reeve: Doug Oleksyn
  - Governing body: RM of Shellbrook No. 493 Council
  - Administrator: Hugh Otterson
  - Office location: Shellbrook

Area (2016)
  - Land: 1,235.75 km^{2} (477.13 sq mi)

Population (2016)
  - Total: 1,587
  - Density: 1.3/km^{2} (3.4/sq mi)
- Time zone: CST
  - Summer (DST): CST
- Area codes: 306 and 639

The Rural Municipality of Shellbrook No. 493 (2016 population: 1,587) is a rural municipality (RM) in the Canadian province of Saskatchewan within Census Division No. 16 and SARM Division No. 5. It is located in the north-central portion of the province west of the city of Prince Albert.

== History ==
The RM of Rozilee No. 493 was originally incorporated as a rural municipality on January 1, 1913. Its name was changed to the RM of Shellbrook No. 493 on October 20, 1923.

== Geography ==
The boundaries of the municipality extend north by Prince Albert National Park, to the west by Canwood No. 494, to the southwest by Leask No. 464, to the south by Duck Lake No. 463, to the east by Buckland No. 491, and to the northeast by Paddockwood No. 520. There are several First Nations Indian reserves bordering it on the northeast, between it and Paddockwood.

=== Communities and localities ===
The following urban municipalities are surrounded by the RM.

Towns

- Shellbrook

The following unincorporated communities are within the RM.

Organized hamlets

- Crutwell
- Holbein

== Demographics ==
Population history (1981–2016)
Year	Pop.	±%
1981	1,879	—
1986	1,956	+4.1%
1991	1,834	−6.2%
1996	1,793	−2.2%
2001	1,728	−3.6%
2006	1,636	−5.3%
2011	1,533	−6.3%
2016	1,587	+3.5%
Source: Statistics Canada via Saskatchewan Bureau of Statistics

In the 2021 Census of Population conducted by Statistics Canada, the RM of Shellbrook No. 493 had a population of 1,581 living in 613 of its 767 total private dwellings, a change of −0.4% from its 2016 population of 1,587. With a land area of 1,213.96 km^{2} (468.71 sq mi), it had a population density of 1.3/km^{2} (3.4/sq mi) in 2021.

In the 2016 Census of Population, the RM of Shellbrook No. 493 recorded a population of 1,587 living in 601 of its 764 total private dwellings, a 3.5% change from its 2011 population of 1,533. With a land area of 1,235.75 km^{2} (477.13 sq mi), it had a population density of 1.3/km^{2} (3.3/sq mi) in 2016.

== Government ==
The RM of Shellbrook No. 493 is governed by an elected municipal council and an appointed administrator that meets on the first Wednesday of every month. The reeve of the RM is Doug Oleksyn while its administrator is Hugh Otterson. The RM's office is located in Shellbrook.

== Transportation ==
Rail

- Big River Branch C.N.R—serves Prince Albert, Shellbrook, Clonfert, Canwood, Polwarth
- Blaine Lake Branch C.N.R—serves Prince Albert, Buckland, Crutwell, Holbein, Shellbrook, Parkside, Kilwinning

Roads

- Highway 693—intersects Highway 3
- Highway 3—serves Shellbrook, Saskatchewan changes name to Highway 55
- Highway 240—serves Shellbrook, Saskatchewan
- Highway 40—intersects Highway 3

== See also ==
- List of rural municipalities in Saskatchewan
