= Saskatchewan Highway 368 =

Provincial highway in Saskatchewan, Canada

Highway 368

Route information
- Maintained by Ministry of Highways and Infrastructure
- Length: 89.4 km (55.6 mi)

Major junctions
- South end: Highway 5 at Muenster
- Highway 41 at Claggett
- North end: CanAm Highway / Highway 3 at Beatty

Location
- Country: Canada
- Province: Saskatchewan
- Rural municipalities: St. Peter, Lake Lenore, Flett's Springs

Highway system
- Provincial highways in Saskatchewan
← Highway 367	→ Highway 369

Highway 368 is a provincial highway in the Canadian province of Saskatchewan. It runs from Highway 5 in Muenster to the CanAm Highway (Highway 3) in Beatty. It is about 89 kilometres (55 mi) long.

Highway 368 intersects Highways 756, 777, 776, and 41. Highway 368 passes near Lake Lenore, St. Brieux, Pathlow, and Claggett.

== Route description ==
Hwy 368 begins in the Rural Municipality of St. Peter No. 369 at an intersection with Hwy 5 (unsigned Hwy 667) on the western side of Muenster, with the road continuing south for a short distance as a connector to Railway Avenue. It curves north across Wolverine Creek, travelling through rural farmland to cross Hwy 756 between Marysburg and Annaheim before entering he village of Lake Lenore, where it bypasses downtown to the east, crosses the Canadian National Railway's St. Brieux subdivision twice, and goes through a long switchback as it shares a short concurrency (overlap) with Hwy 777. Entering the Rural Municipality of Lake Lenore No. 399, the highway travels parallel to the nearby eastern coastline of Lenore Lake, passing through the locality of Daylesford on its way to the town of St. Brieux, where it shares a concurrency with Hwy 773 (Barbier Drive) as it travels along the eastern side of town, passing near St. Brieux Regional Park. Leaving St. Brieux, Hwy 368 crosses the same rail line again and enters the Rural Municipality of Flett's Springs No. 429.

Travelling on through rural farmland, the road goes through a switchback as it passes by the hamlet of Pathlow, crossing several small streams on its way to have intersections with '44 Trail' (provides access to the hamlets of Meskanaw, Ethelton, and Lipsett) and Hwy 41. After crossing a few more small creeks, Hwy 368 enters the village of Beatty, where it comes to an end at an intersection with the CanAm Highway (Hwy 3). The road continues north into the village as 1st Avenue. The entire length of Hwy 368 is a paved, two-lane highway.

== History ==
It was voted the worst highway in Saskatchewan in the spring of 2006.

Between 2008 and 2012, a 35-km stretch of Highway 368 near Lenore Lake was upgraded to primary weight. The rebuilt section runs from Grid Road 756 south of Lake Lenore north to the Pleasantdale Grid Road south of St. Brieux. The project cost $25 million and was part of the provincial government's 10-year, $5 billion Transportation for Economic Advantage program.

== Major intersections ==
From south to north:

Rural municipality	Location	km	mi	Destinations	Notes
St. Peter No. 369	Muenster	0.0	0.0	Highway 5 (Hwy 667) – Watson, Humboldt, Saskatoon	Southern terminus
St. Peter No. 369		14.3	8.9	Highway 756 – Marysburg, Annaheim	
St. Peter No. 369	Lake Lenore	24.0	14.9	Highway 777 west – Middle Lake	South end of Hwy 777 concurrency
St. Peter No. 369		30.1	18.7	Highway 777 east – Naicam	North end of Hwy 777 concurrency
Lake Lenore No. 399		49.6	30.8	Highway 773 east – Pleasantdale	South end of Hwy 773 concurrency
Lake Lenore No. 399	St. Brieux	56.1	34.9	Highway 773 west (Barbier Drive) – St. Brieux Regional Park	North end of Hwy 773 concurrency
Flett's Springs No. 429	Pathlow	68.1	42.3	Township Road 433	
Flett's Springs No. 429		76.6	47.6	'44' Trail – Meskanaw	Former Highway 776
Flett's Springs No. 429	Claggett	80.0	49.7	Highway 41 – Wakaw, Saskatoon, Melfort	
Flett's Springs No. 429	Beatty	89.4	55.6	Highway 3 / CanAm Highway – Prince Albert, Melfort	Northern terminus
1.000 mi = 1.609 km; 1.000 km = 0.621 mi: Concurrency terminus

== See also ==
- Transportation in Saskatchewan
- Roads in Saskatchewan
