= Rural Municipality of Aberdeen No. 373 =

Rural municipality in Saskatchewan, Canada

Aberdeen No. 373
- Rural Municipality
- Rural Municipality of Aberdeen No. 373
- Location of the RM of Aberdeen No. 373 in Saskatchewan
- Coordinates: 52.429°N 106.293°W
- Country: Canada
- Province: Saskatchewan
- Census division: 15
- SARM division: 5
- Federal riding: Carlton Trail—Eagle Creek
- Provincial riding: Batoche; Saskatoon Stonebridge-Dakota
- Formed: December 13, 1909

Government
  - Reeve: Martin Bettker
  - Governing body: RM of Aberdeen No. 373 Council
  - Chief Administrative Officer: Bridgette Shwytky
  - Office location: Aberdeen

Area (2021)
  - Land: 671.82 km^{2} (259.39 sq mi)

Population (2021)
  - Total: 1,461
  - Density: 2.2/km^{2} (5.7/sq mi)
- Time zone: CST
  - Summer (DST): CST
- Postal codes: S0K 0A0, S7A 0A1, S7A 0A4, S7A 0A5, S7A 0A6, S7A 0A7, S7K 1P3, S7K 3J9
- Area codes: 306 and 639
- Address: 101 Industrial Drive Box 40 Aberdeen, SK S0K 0A0
- Facebook: RM of Aberdeen No. 373
- Website: Official website

The Rural Municipality of Aberdeen No. 373 (2021 population: 1,461) is a Rural Municipality (RM) in the Canadian province of Saskatchewan within Census Division No. 15 and SARM Division No. 5. It is located on the South Saskatchewan River.

== History ==
The RM of Aberdeen No. 373 incorporated as a Rural Municipality on December 13, 1909.

Heritage properties

There is one historical building located within the Rural Municipality, the St. Paul's Bergheim Evangelical Lutheran Church constructed in 1919 by early immigrants from Germany. The church is located on a 12-hectare parcel of land on Bergheim Road. The church is still in use.

== Geography ==
=== Communities and localities ===
The following Urban Municipalities are surrounded by the RM.

Towns

- Aberdeen

The following unincorporated communities are within the RM.

Localities

- Clarkboro
- Edenburg
- Laniwci
- Strawberry Hills
- Strawberry Ridge
- Cherry Hills
- Valley View Heights
- Mission Ridge
- Bergheim Estates
- The Meadows
- Prairie Rose Estates

== Demographics ==
Population history (1981–2021)
Year	Pop.	±%
1981	681	—
1986	734	+7.8%
1991	730	−0.5%
1996	758	+3.8%
2001	816	+7.7%
2006	765	−6.2%
2011	1,016	+32.8%
2016	1,379	+35.7%
2021	1,461	+5.9%
Source: Statistics Canada via Saskatchewan Bureau of Statistics

In the 2021 Census of Population conducted by Statistics Canada, the RM of Aberdeen No. 373 had a population of 1,461 living in 487 of its 528 total private dwellings, a change of 5.9% from its 2016 population of 1,379. With a land area of 671.82 km^{2} (259.39 sq mi), it had a population density of 2.2/km^{2} (5.6/sq mi) in 2021.

In the 2016 Census of Population, the RM of Aberdeen No. 373 recorded a population of 1,379 living in 466 of its 558 total private dwellings, a 35.7% change from its 2011 population of 1,016. With a land area of 673.42 km^{2} (260.01 sq mi), it had a population density of 2.0/km^{2} (5.3/sq mi) in 2016.

== Economy ==
Major employers in the RM include Agrium Canada, AGT Foods pulse crop facility, Parrish & Heimbecker Ltd., and the Hold-on Industries manufacturing facility. The area's economy is dominated by agriculture.

== Government ==
The RM of Aberdeen No. 373 is governed by an elected Municipal Council and an appointed Administrator that meets on the second Thursday of every month. The Reeve of the RM is Martin Bettker while its Administrator is Bridgette Shwytky. The RM's Office is located in the town of Aberdeen.

== Transportation ==
Rail

- CNR—Winnipeg-Edmonton Main Line—serves Vonda, Aberdeen, Clarkboro, Warman.

Roads

As the RM is responsible for snow removal, upkeep and repair in conjunction with the provincial highway department, these are the main Saskatchewan highways served by Aberdeen No. 373.

- Highway 27—serves Vonda to Aberdeen
- Highway 41—serves Alvena to Saskatoon
- Highway 784—Highway 4 to Highway 41 near Aberdeen
- Highway 785—Highway 12 to Highway 41 near Aberdeen
