= Lake Lenore =

Lake Lenore may refer to:

- Rural Municipality of Lake Lenore No. 399, a rural municipality in Saskatchewan, Canada
- Lake Lenore, Saskatchewan, a village in Saskatchewan, Canada
- Lake Lenore (Washington), a lake in the state of Washington in the United States

== See also ==
- Lenore Lake, a lake in Saskatchewan, Canada
