= Berard Beach =

Community in Saskatchewan, Canada

Coordinates: 52.6943°N 105.5559°W

Berard Beach is an unincorporated community on the eastern shore of Wakaw Lake in the RM of Hoodoo No. 401, Saskatchewan, Canada. The community is located about 6 kilometres (3.7 mi) north of Highway 41 and approximately 12 kilometres (7.5 mi) east of the town of Wakaw.

== See also ==
- List of communities in Saskatchewan
