= Nickorick Beach =

Hamlet in Saskatchewan, Canada

Coordinates: 52.6564°N 105.6017°W

Nickorick Beach is a hamlet on the southern shore of Wakaw Lake in Rural Municipality of Hoodoo No. 401, Saskatchewan, Canada. The hamlet is located on Range Road 260 north of its intersection with Highway 41, approximately 10 kilometres (6.2 mi) east of the town of Wakaw.

== See also ==
- List of communities in Saskatchewan
- List of hamlets in Saskatchewan
