= Nelson Beach, Saskatchewan =

Unincorporated community in Saskatchewan, Canada

Nelson Beach
- Unincorporated community
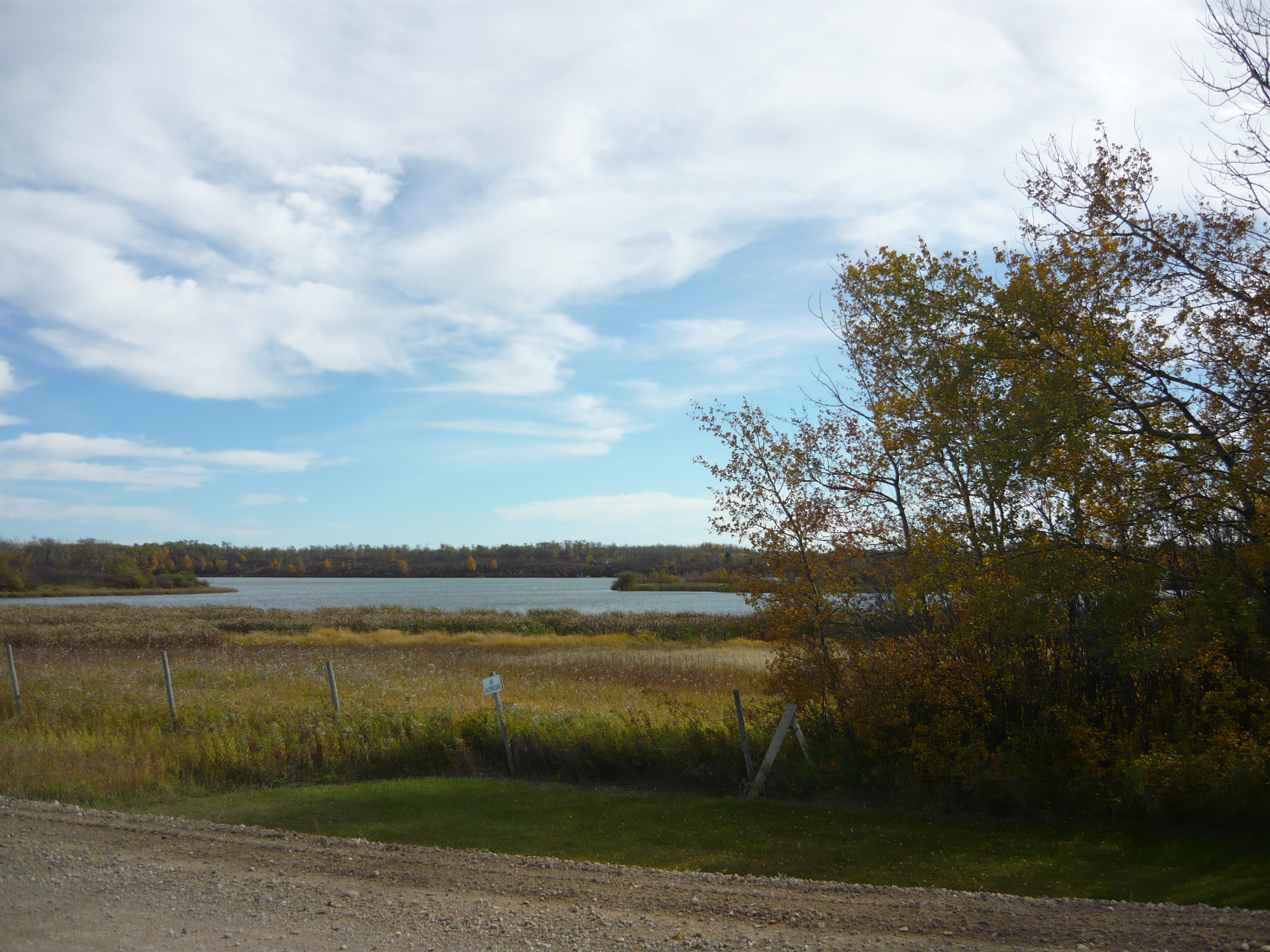
- Wakaw Lake

- Location within Saskatchewan
- Coordinates: 52.385999°N 105.421511°W
- Country: Canada
- Province: Saskatchewan
- Region: Mid-West
- Census division: 15
- Rural Municipality: Hoodoo
- Time zone: CST
- Postal code: S0K 4P0
- Area code: 306
- Highways: Highway 41
- Railways: WRI

Nelson Beach is an unincorporated community within the Rural Municipality of Hoodoo No. 401, Saskatchewan, Canada. The hamlet is located 2 km east of the town of Wakaw, approximately 95 kilometres (59 mi) northeast of the city of Saskatoon, and about an equal distance south of Prince Albert, on the southwest shore of Wakaw Lake.

== See also ==
- List of communities in Saskatchewan
