= Wakaw Lake, Saskatchewan =

Resort village in Saskatchewan, Canada

Wakaw Lake
- Resort village
- Resort Village of Wakaw Lake
- Location within Saskatchewan
- Coordinates: 52.643°N 105.637°W
- Country: Canada
- Province: Saskatchewan
- Census division: 15
- Rural municipality: RM of Hoodoo No. 401
- Incorporated: October 21, 1959

Government
  - Mayor: Maurice Rivard
  - Governing body: Resort Village Council
  - Administrator: Hilkewich Pamela

Area (2016)
  - Land: 0.59 km^{2} (0.23 sq mi)

Population (2016)
  - Total: 72
  - Density: 116.1/km^{2} (301/sq mi)
- Time zone: CST
  - Summer (DST): CST
- Postal code: S0K 4P0
- Area codes: 306 and 639
- Highway(s): Highway 41
- Railway(s): WRI
- Waterway(s): Wakaw Lake
- Website: Official website

Wakaw Lake (2016 population: 72) is a resort village in the Canadian province of Saskatchewan within Census Division No. 15. It is on the shores of Wakaw Lake in the Rural Municipality of Hoodoo No. 401. It is on Highway 41 approximately 86 kilometres (53 mi) north-east of Saskatoon and 63 kilometres (39 mi) south of Prince Albert.

== History ==
Wakaw Lake incorporated as a resort village on October 21, 1959. The resort village takes its name from a nearby lake of the same name "Wakaw Lake", which is Cree meaning "crooked."

== Demographics ==
Population history (1981–2016)
Year	Pop.	±%
1981	10	—
1986	4	−60.0%
1991	12	+200.0%
1996	12	+0.0%
2001	30	+150.0%
2006	35	+16.7%
2011	30	−14.3%
2016	72	+140.0%
Source: Statistics Canada via Saskatchewan Bureau of Statistics

In the 2021 Census of Population conducted by Statistics Canada, Wakaw Lake had a population of 66 living in 39 of its 140 total private dwellings, a change of −8.3% from its 2016 population of 72. With a land area of 0.61 km^{2} (0.24 sq mi), it had a population density of 108.2/km^{2} (280.2/sq mi) in 2021.

In the 2016 Census of Population conducted by Statistics Canada, the Resort Village of Wakaw Lake recorded a population of 72 living in 32 of its 108 total private dwellings, a 140% change from its 2011 population of 30. With a land area of 0.62 km^{2} (0.24 sq mi), it had a population density of 116.1/km^{2} (300.8/sq mi) in 2016.

== Government ==
The Resort Village of Wakaw Lake is governed by an elected municipal council and an appointed administrator. The mayor is Maurice Rivard and its administrator is Pamela Hilkewich.

== See also ==
- List of communities in Saskatchewan
- List of municipalities in Saskatchewan
- List of resort villages in Saskatchewan
- List of villages in Saskatchewan
- List of summer villages in Alberta
