= Pathlow =

Pathlow may refer to:

- Pathlow, Saskatchewan, Canada
- Pathlow, Warwickshire, England
