= Rural Municipality of Hoodoo No. 401 =

Rural municipality in Saskatchewan, Canada

Hoodoo No. 401
- Rural municipality
- Rural Municipality of Hoodoo No. 401
- Location of the RM of Hoodoo No. 401 in Saskatchewan
- Coordinates: 52.568°N 105.678°W
- Country: Canada
- Province: Saskatchewan
- Census division: 15
- SARM division: 5
- Formed: January 1, 1913

Government
  - Reeve: Glenn Ledray
  - Governing body: RM of Hoodoo No. 401 Council
  - Administrator: Fay Stewart
  - Office location: Cudworth

Area (2016)
  - Land: 810.58 km^{2} (312.97 sq mi)

Population (2016)
  - Total: 675
  - Density: 0.8/km^{2} (2.1/sq mi)
- Time zone: CST
  - Summer (DST): CST
- Area codes: 306 and 639
- Highway(s): Highway 2 Highway 41; Highway 777
- Waterway(s): Wakaw Lake; Arthur Lake; Marie Lake; Boucher Lake

The Rural Municipality of Hoodoo No. 401 (2016 population: 675) is a rural municipality (RM) in the Canadian province of Saskatchewan within Census Division No. 15 and SARM Division No. 5.

== History ==
The RM of Hoodoo No. 401 incorporated as a rural municipality on January 1, 1913.

== Geography ==
=== Communities and localities ===
The following urban municipalities are surrounded by the RM.

Towns

- Wakaw
- Cudworth

Resort villages

- Wakaw Lake

The following unincorporated communities are within the RM.

Organized hamlets

- Balone Beach
- Cudsaskwa Beach

Localities

- Berard Beach
- Bonne Madone
- Domremy Beach
- Ens
- Lepine
- Nelson Beach
- Nickorick Beach

== Demographics ==
Population history (1981–2016)
Year	Pop.	±%
1981	856	—
1986	824	−3.7%
1991	699	−15.2%
1996	676	−3.3%
2001	701	+3.7%
2006	804	+14.7%
2011	706	−12.2%
2016	675	−4.4%
Source: Statistics Canada via Saskatchewan Bureau of Statistics

In the 2021 Census of Population conducted by Statistics Canada, the RM of Hoodoo No. 401 had a population of 802 living in 367 of its 824 total private dwellings, a change of 18.8% from its 2016 population of 675. With a land area of 786.69 km^{2} (303.74 sq mi), it had a population density of 1.0/km^{2} (2.6/sq mi) in 2021.

In the 2016 Census of Population, the RM of Hoodoo No. 401 recorded a population of 675 living in 293 of its 802 total private dwellings, a −4.4% change from its 2011 population of 706. With a land area of 810.58 km^{2} (312.97 sq mi), it had a population density of 0.8/km^{2} (2.2/sq mi) in 2016.

== Attractions ==
- Wakaw Lake
- Wakaw Heritage Museum
- Wakaw Lake Regional Park
- Prud'homme Providence Museum

== Government ==
The RM of Hoodoo No. 401 is governed by an elected municipal council and an appointed administrator that meets on the second Wednesday of every month. The reeve of the RM is Glenn Ledray while its administrator is Fay Stuart. The RM's office is located in Cudworth.

== Transportation ==
- Saskatchewan Highway 2
- Saskatchewan Highway 41
- Saskatchewan Highway 777
- Cudworth Municipal Airport
- Cudworth Airport
- WRI Railway

== See also ==
- List of rural municipalities in Saskatchewan
