= Balone Beach =

Community in Saskatchewan, Canada

Coordinates: 52°40′04″N 105°36′04″W

Balone Beach is a hamlet in the Canadian province of Saskatchewan on the northern shore of Wakaw Lake. It is in the Rural Municipality of Hoodoo No. 401 adjacent to Wakaw Lake Regional Park, about 12 kilometres (7.5 mi) east of Wakaw.

== Demographics ==
In the 2021 Census of Population conducted by Statistics Canada, Balone Beach had a population of 18 living in 10 of its 32 total private dwellings, a change of 260% from its 2016 population of 5. With a land area of 0.05 km^{2} (0.019 sq mi), it had a population density of 360.0/km^{2} (932.4/sq mi) in 2021.

== See also ==
- List of communities in Saskatchewan
