= Ens, Saskatchewan =

Locality in Saskatchewan, Canada

Coordinates: 52.6965°N 105.7132°W

Ens is a locality in the Rural Municipality of Hoodoo No. 401, Saskatchewan, Canada. It is located at the intersections of Highway 2 and Township Road 432, approximately 8 kilometres (5.0 mi) north of the town of Wakaw.

== See also ==
- List of communities in Saskatchewan
