= Ethelton, Saskatchewan =

Ethelton
- Hamlet
- Location within Saskatchewan Location within Canada
- Coordinates: 52°47′15″N 104°55′58″W
- Country: Canada
- Province: Saskatchewan
- Region: Saskatchewan
- Census division: 15
- Rural Municipality: Flett's Springs No. 429
- Time zone: CST
- Area code: 306
- Highways: Highway 41

Ethelton is an hamlet in Flett's Springs No. 429, Saskatchewan, Canada. The locality is located along Highway 41, about 25 kilometres (16 mi) southeast of Melfort and 140 kilometres (87 mi) northwest of Saskatoon.

== See also ==
- List of communities in Saskatchewan
