= Domremy =

Domremy or Domrémy is part of the name of several communes in France:

- Domremy-la-Canne, in the Meuse department
- Domrémy-la-Pucelle, in the Vosges department, formerly Domrémy, which was the birthplace of Joan of Arc
- Domremy-Landéville, in the Haute-Marne department

In Canada:

- Domremy, Saskatchewan, a small hamlet
- Domremy Beach, Saskatchewan, a small hamlet
