= Melfort Creek =

River in Saskatchewan, Canada

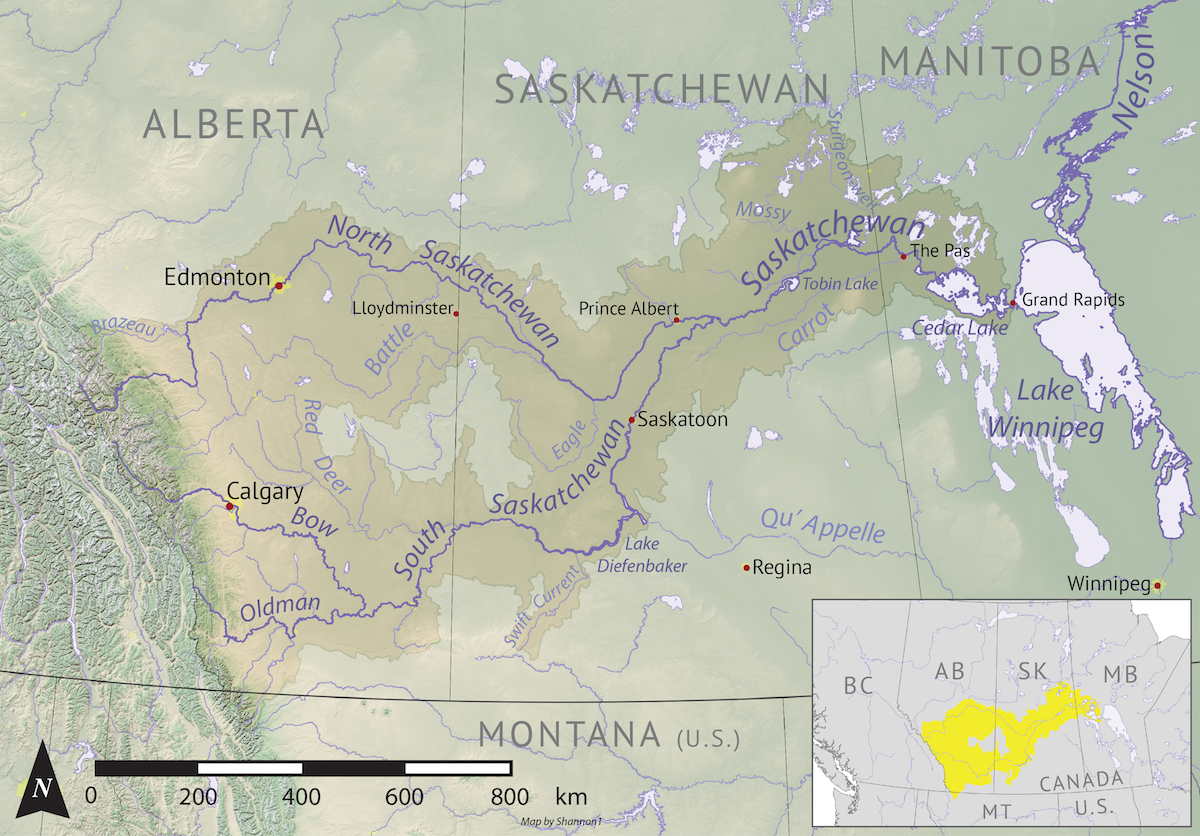
- Map of the Saskatchewan River drainage basin

- Location of river's mouth in Saskatchewan Melfort Creek (Canada)

Location
- Country: Canada
- Province: Saskatchewan

Physical characteristics
- Source: Eagle Lake
  - location: RM of Lake Lenore No. 399
  - coordinates: 52.6452°N 104.6071°W
- Mouth: Carrot River
  - location: RM of Willow Creek No. 458
  - coordinates: 53.0410°N 104.6240°W

Basin features
- River system: Nelson River
- Tributaries
  - left: Thatch Creek
- Waterbodies: Melfort PFRA Reservoir; Melfort Town Reservoir

Melfort Creek, originally known as Stoney Creek, is a river in the Canadian province of Saskatchewan. It is in the aspen parkland ecozone and flows through the "most productive farmland areas in Canada, the Carrot River Valley, a territory that has never known drought or severe crop failure". The river begins at Eagle Lake and flows north where it meets the Carrot River in the Rural Municipality of Willow Creek No. 458. The Carrot River is a tributary of the Saskatchewan River within the Nelson River drainage basin. Along Melfort Creek's course are two reservoirs and the city of Melfort.

== History ==
In 1892, the first European settlers arrived in the area and built a settlement called Stoney Creek on the banks of Stoney Creek. In 1902, the entire community (buildings and all) moved 2 kilometres (1.2 mi) to the north-west to meet the railway that was being built through the area. At that time, the community and river were renamed Melfort after Melfort estate in Argyllshire, Scotland, the birthplace of Mrs Reginald Beatty who was the first white woman settler in the area.

== Course ==
Melfort Creek begins at Eagle Lake in the Rural Municipality of Lake Lenore No. 399 and heads north towards the city of Melfort. South of Melfort, in the RM of Star City No. 428, Star City Dam was built creating Melfort PFRA Reservoir. Downstream from Star City Dam, and adjacent to the east side of Melfort, is the Melfort Town Reservoir. Part of the 3.6 km (2.2 mi) Melfort Kinsmen Centenary Trail follows Melfort Creek.

Melfort Creek continues north from Melfort and meets the Carrot River in the RM of Willow Creek No. 458. Highway 6 follows the river's course for most of its length. Other highways that cross Melfort Creek include Highways 776, 3, and 778.

== Star City Dam ==
Star City Dam (52.8131°N 104.5696°W) was constructed on Melfort Creek upstream from the Melfort Town Reservoir. The 11.7-metre (38 ft) high dam was built by the Prairie Farm Rehabilitation Administration (PFRA) in 1967. The reservoir behind the dam, named Melfort PFRA Reservoir, has a volume of 2,541 dam^{3} (2,060 acre⋅ft) and covers an area of 70 hectares (170 acres). It is owned and operated by the Saskatchewan Water Security Agency.

== See also ==
- List of rivers of Saskatchewan
- Hudson Bay drainage basin
- Saskatchewan Water Security Agency
- List of dams and reservoirs in Canada
