= Lepine, Saskatchewan =

Community in Saskatchewan, Canada

Lepine
- Hamlet
- Interactive map of Lepine
- Country: Canada
- Province: Saskatchewan
- Rural municipality: Hoodoo No. 401

Government
  - Type: Unincorporated
  - Body: RM of Hoodoo No. 401
- Elevation: 539 m (1,768 ft)
- Time zone: UTC−6 (CST)
- Highways: Highway 41

Lepine is a hamlet in the Rural Municipality of Hoodoo No. 401, Saskatchewan, Canada. The hamlet is located at along Highway 41 approximately 102 kilometres (63 mi) north of the city of Saskatoon. Its two abandoned elevators are popular with photographers.

== See also ==
- List of communities in Saskatchewan
- List of hamlets in Saskatchewan
