= Domremy Beach =

Community in Saskatchewan, Canada

Coordinates: 52.700°N 105.562°W

Domremy Beach is a hamlet on the northern shore of Wakaw Lake in the Rural Municipality of Hoodoo No. 401, Saskatchewan, Canada. The hamlet is located about 15 kilometres (9.3 mi) east of Highway 2 on Township road 432, approximately 20 kilometres (12 mi) east of the town of Wakaw.

== See also ==
- List of communities in Saskatchewan
- List of hamlets in Saskatchewan
