= St. Brieux =

Town in Saskatchewan, Canada

St. Brieux St-Brieux (French)
- Town
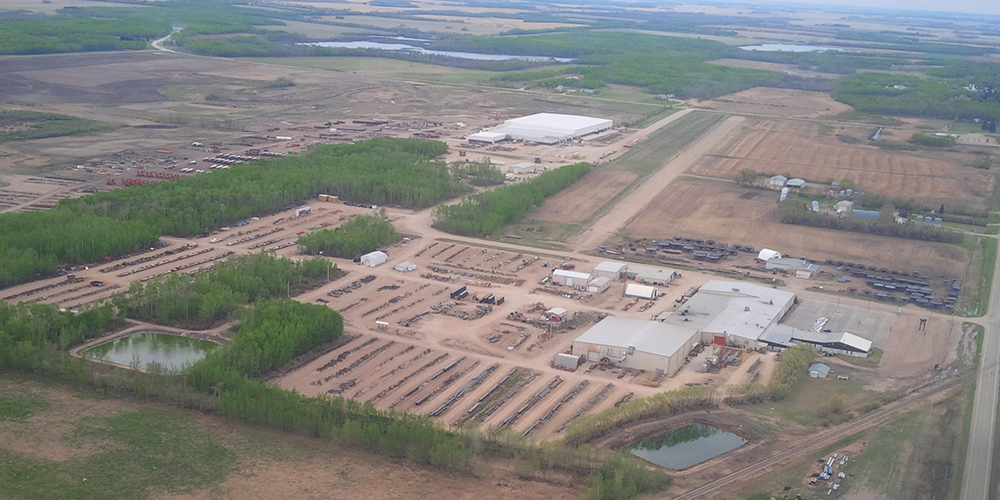
- Aerial view of industrial building and airport on north end of community

- Location of St. Brieux in Saskatchewan St. Brieux (Canada)
- Coordinates: 52.633°N 104.886°W
- Country: Canada
- Province: Saskatchewan
- Census division: 15
- Rural Municipality: Lake Lenore
- Post office Founded: June 1, 1905
- Incorporated (Village): 1913

Government
  - Mayor: Cindy Placsko
  - Governing body: St. Brieux Town Council

Area
  - Total: 2.55 km^{2} (0.98 sq mi)

Population (2011)
  - Total: 590
  - Density: 231.4/km^{2} (599/sq mi)
- Time zone: UTC−6 (CST)
- Postal code: S0K 3V0
- Area code: 306
- Highways: Highway 368 / Highway 773
- Waterways: Lenore Lake
- Website: Town of St. Brieux website

St. Brieux (/bruː/) is a town in the Canadian province of Saskatchewan. It is located near Highway 368 and Highway 773. St. Brieux is located north of the village of Lake Lenore on the eastern shore of St. Brieux Lake. St. Brieux Regional Park and Golf Course is adjacent to the west side of the town.

St. Brieux is one of the few French speaking communities in Saskatchewan.

== History ==
Founded in 1904, the St. Brieux district was settled by immigrants from Brittany, France; the name of St. Brieux was chosen in memory of Saint-Brieuc, France, where many of the settlers originated. Families continued to arrive from France until World War I broke out in 1914. From 1908 to 1920, American settlers, many of whom were descendants of French Canadians who had earlier immigrated to the United States, came to St. Brieux. From 1911 to 1923, people of Hungarian and Italian descent moved into the area, along with English speaking settlers, mainly from Ontario.

== Demographics ==
In the 2021 Census of Population conducted by Statistics Canada, St. Brieux had a population of 638 living in 250 of its 268 total private dwellings, a change of −4.3% from its 2016 population of 667. With a land area of 2.56 km^{2} (0.99 sq mi), it had a population density of 249.2/km^{2} (645.5/sq mi) in 2021.

Canada census – St. Brieux community profile

	2011
Population	590 (19.9% from 2006)
Land area	2.55 km^{2} (0.98 sq mi)
Population density	231.4/km^{2} (599/sq mi)
Median age	33.8 (M: 33.9, F: 33.6)
Private dwellings	235 (total)
Median household income

References: 2011

== Attractions ==
The St. Brieux Museum (c. 1919) is designated a Municipal Heritage Property under Saskatchewan's Heritage Property Act.

St-Brieux Catholic Church features stained glass windows by Rault Frères (Brittany) Franc.

The largest employer is Bourgault Industries Ltd. Bourgault Industries Ltd. also operates the St. Brieux Airport.

== St. Brieux Regional Park ==
St. Brieux Regional Park (52.6321°N 104.9025°W) is a regional park adjacent to the west side of St. Brieux on the eastern shore of St. Brieux Lake. The lake is a fresh water, spring-fed lake that flows into the saline Lenore Lake. The park, which was founded in 1972, has a campground, golf course, picnic area, beach, hiking trails, mini golf, and historic sites. St. Brieux won the Park of the Year Award in 2013.

The campground is well treed in a forest of aspen and has electrical hookups, modern washrooms, coin operated showers, and a sewer dump. There is a beach for swimming and a boat launch for lake access. Fish commonly found in St. Brieux Lake include walleye, northern pike, and yellow perch. In 2012, a record 1.26-kilogram (2.8 lb) yellow perch was caught in the lake. The park is on the site of the former Roman Catholic Rectory, which was built in about 1918. There are municipal and Roman Catholic cemeteries, a replica of the first church in St. Brieux, and an historic monument to the original settlers.

St. Brieux Regional Park Golf Course is a 9-hole course with grass greens. It is a par 35 with 2,875 total yards. There is a licensed clubhouse, pro shop, and rentals.

== See also ==
- List of communities in Saskatchewan
- List of francophone communities in Saskatchewan
- List of towns in Saskatchewan
