= Beatty, Saskatchewan =

Village in Saskatchewan, Canada

Beatty
- Village
- Village of Beatty
- Location of Beatty in Saskatchewan Beatty (Canada)
- Coordinates: 52.900619°N 104.804678°W
- Country: Canada
- Province: Saskatchewan
- Census division: 14
- Rural municipality: Flett's Springs No. 429
- Post office Founded: 1908

Government
  - Type: Municipal
  - Governing body: Beatty Village Council

Area
  - Total: 0.82 km^{2} (0.32 sq mi)

Population (2006)
  - Total: 61
- Time zone: CST
- Postal code: S0J 0C0
- Area code: 306

Beatty (2016 population: 60) is a village in the Canadian province of Saskatchewan within the Rural Municipality of Flett's Springs No. 429 and Census Division No. 15. The village is located approximately 13 kilometres (8.1 mi) northwest of the city of Melfort. It is at the junction of Highway 3 and Highway 368. In 1925, Beatty was a Canadian National Railways (CNR) rail station on the Swan River – Prince Albert branch line. The area surrounding Beatty is predominantly farmland and the main source of employment is agriculture.

== History ==
Beatty was named in 1904, after (and by) Reginald Beatty, an employee of the Hudson's Bay Company and the first settler in the Melfort district. Beatty post office was established in 1908 in the federal electoral district of Rosthern. Beatty incorporated as a village on March 31, 1921.

A community centre was built in 1978 through local fundraising. This is still open and serves as a venue for weddings and community events.

== Demographics ==
Population history (1981–2016)
Year	Pop.	±%
1981	108	—
1986	105	−2.8%
1991	112	+6.7%
1996	87	−22.3%
2001	79	−9.2%
2006	61	−22.8%
2011	63	+3.3%
2016	60	−4.8%
Source: Statistics Canada via Saskatchewan Bureau of Statistics

In the 2021 Census of Population conducted by Statistics Canada, Beatty had a population of 65 living in 29 of its 30 total private dwellings, a change of 8.3% from its 2016 population of 60. With a land area of 0.82 km^{2} (0.32 sq mi), it had a population density of 79.3/km^{2} (205.3/sq mi) in 2021.

In the 2016 Census of Population, the Village of Beatty recorded a population of 60 living in 23 of its 25 total private dwellings, a −5% change from its 2011 population of 63. With a land area of 0.82 km^{2} (0.32 sq mi), it had a population density of 73.2/km^{2} (189.5/sq mi) in 2016.

== Sports ==
Like most small communities in Saskatchewan, sports centred around hockey. In 1948 the Beatty Memorial Rink was built by a group of local volunteers. After many years, this rink was condemned to be destroyed because of its structural integrity. The town rallied again and built a new rink. This rink served the town until 1993.

In 1985 the Beatty Barons Senior Men's hockey team won the provincial championships. The town of Beatty fielded pre-novice and novice hockey teams until 1993. The rink was also used for community skating and hosting hockey tournaments.

Due to a financial issue which came to a head in 1993, the rink was sold to the town of Rocanville. The town of Rocanville had the rink taken apart piece by piece and moved 423 kilometres (263 mi) away.

== Education ==
Children living in Beatty are sent by bus to school in Melfort.

The early one room school house in town was Beatty School District #1766. This also hosted a second one-room school house for the higher grades including grade 12. This school was open from 1933 to 1967.

== See also ==
- List of communities in Saskatchewan
- List of francophone communities in Saskatchewan
- List of villages in Saskatchewan
