= Rural Municipality of Flett's Springs No. 429 =

Rural municipality in Saskatchewan, Canada

Flett's Springs No. 429 Carrot River No. 429 (1909–1938)
- Rural municipality
- Rural Municipality of Flett's Springs No. 429
- Location of the RM of Flett's Springs No. 429 in Saskatchewan
- Coordinates: 52.806°N 104.835°W
- Country: Canada
- Province: Saskatchewan
- Census division: 15
- SARM division: 5
- Formed: December 13, 1909
- Name change: February 28, 1938 (from RM of Carrot River No. 429)

Government
  - Reeve: Blaine Forsyth
  - Governing body: RM of Flett's Springs No. 429 Council
  - Administrator: Tamie McLean
  - Office location: Melfort

Area (2016)
  - Land: 844.61 km^{2} (326.11 sq mi)

Population (2016)
  - Total: 732
  - Density: 0.9/km^{2} (2.3/sq mi)
- Time zone: CST
  - Summer (DST): CST
- Area codes: 306 and 639

The Rural Municipality of Flett's Springs No. 429 (2016 population: 732) is a rural municipality (RM) in the Canadian province of Saskatchewan within Census Division No. 15 and SARM Division No. 5.

== History ==
The RM of Carrot River No. 429 was originally incorporated as a rural municipality on December 13, 1909. Its name was changed to the RM of Flett's Springs No. 429 on February 28, 1938.

== Geography ==
=== Communities and localities ===
The following urban municipalities are surrounded by the RM.

Cities

- Melfort

Villages

- Beatty

The following unincorporated communities are within the RM.

Localities

- Ethelton
- Pathlow

== Demographics ==
Population history (1981–2016)
Year	Pop.	±%
1981	1,050	—
1986	1,027	−2.2%
1991	899	−12.5%
1996	822	−8.6%
2001	780	−5.1%
2006	736	−5.6%
2011	751	+2.0%
2016	732	−2.5%
Source: Statistics Canada via Saskatchewan Bureau of Statistics

In the 2021 Census of Population conducted by Statistics Canada, the RM of Flett's Springs No. 429 had a population of 656 living in 240 of its 256 total private dwellings, a change of −10.4% from its 2016 population of 732. With a land area of 838.98 km^{2} (323.93 sq mi), it had a population density of 0.8/km^{2} (2.0/sq mi) in 2021.

In the 2016 Census of Population, the RM of Flett's Springs No. 429 recorded a population of 732 living in 266 of its 274 total private dwellings, a −2.5% change from its 2011 population of 751. With a land area of 844.61 km^{2} (326.11 sq mi), it had a population density of 0.9/km^{2} (2.2/sq mi) in 2016.

== Government ==
The RM of Flett's Springs No. 429 is governed by an elected municipal council and an appointed administrator that meets on the second Wednesday of every month. The reeve of the RM is Blaine Forsyth while its administrator is Tamie McLean. The RM's office is located in Melfort.

== Transportation ==
Rail

- Lanigan - Naicam Branch C.P.R—serves Silver Park, Resource, Clemens, Melfort
- Humboldt, Melfort, Ridgedale Branch C.N.R—serves Daylesford, St. Brieux, Pathlow, Lipsett, Melfort, Whittome, Brooksby, Ridgedale
- Swan River - Prince Albert Branch C.N.R—serves Tisdale, Valparaiso, Star City, Naisberry, Melfort, Beatty, Kinistino, Weldon, Branspeth

Roads

- Highway 3—serves Melfort and Beatty
- Highway 368—serves Beatty
- Highway 6—serves Melfort
- Highway 41
- Highway 776

== See also ==
- List of rural municipalities in Saskatchewan
