= Saskatchewan Highway 41 =

Provincial highway in Saskatchewan, Canada

Highway 41
- Highway 41 highlighted in red and Highway 41A highlighted in blue
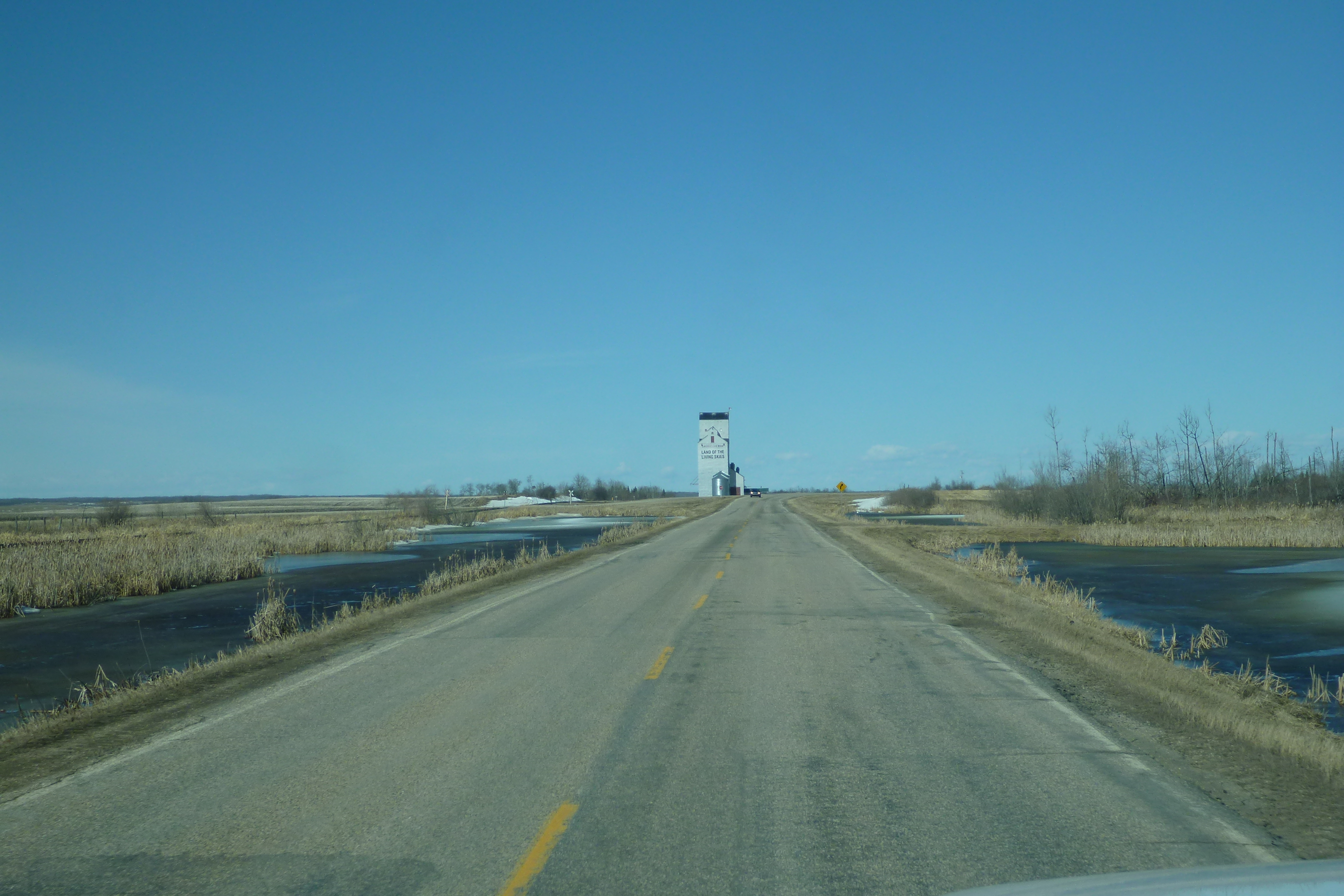
- Highway 41

Route information
- Maintained by Ministry of Highways and Infrastructure & Transport Canada
- Length: 163.4 km (101.5 mi)

Major junctions
- West end: Highway 5 in Saskatoon
- Highway 2 at Wakaw; Highway 20 near Tway
- East end: Highway 3 / Highway 6 / CanAm Highway at Melfort

Location
- Country: Canada
- Province: Saskatchewan
- Rural municipalities: Corman Park, Aberdeen, Grant, Fish Creek, Hoodoo, Three Lakes, Invergordon, Flett's Springs
- Major cities: Saskatoon, Melfort
- Towns: Aberdeen, Wakaw

Highway system
- Provincial highways in Saskatchewan
| ← Highway 40 | → Highway 42 |

Highway 41 is a provincial highway in the Canadian province of Saskatchewan. It runs from Highway 5 in Saskatoon to Highway 3 / Highway 6 in Melfort. The highway also intersects Highway 2. It is about 163 kilometres (101 mi) long.

== Route description ==
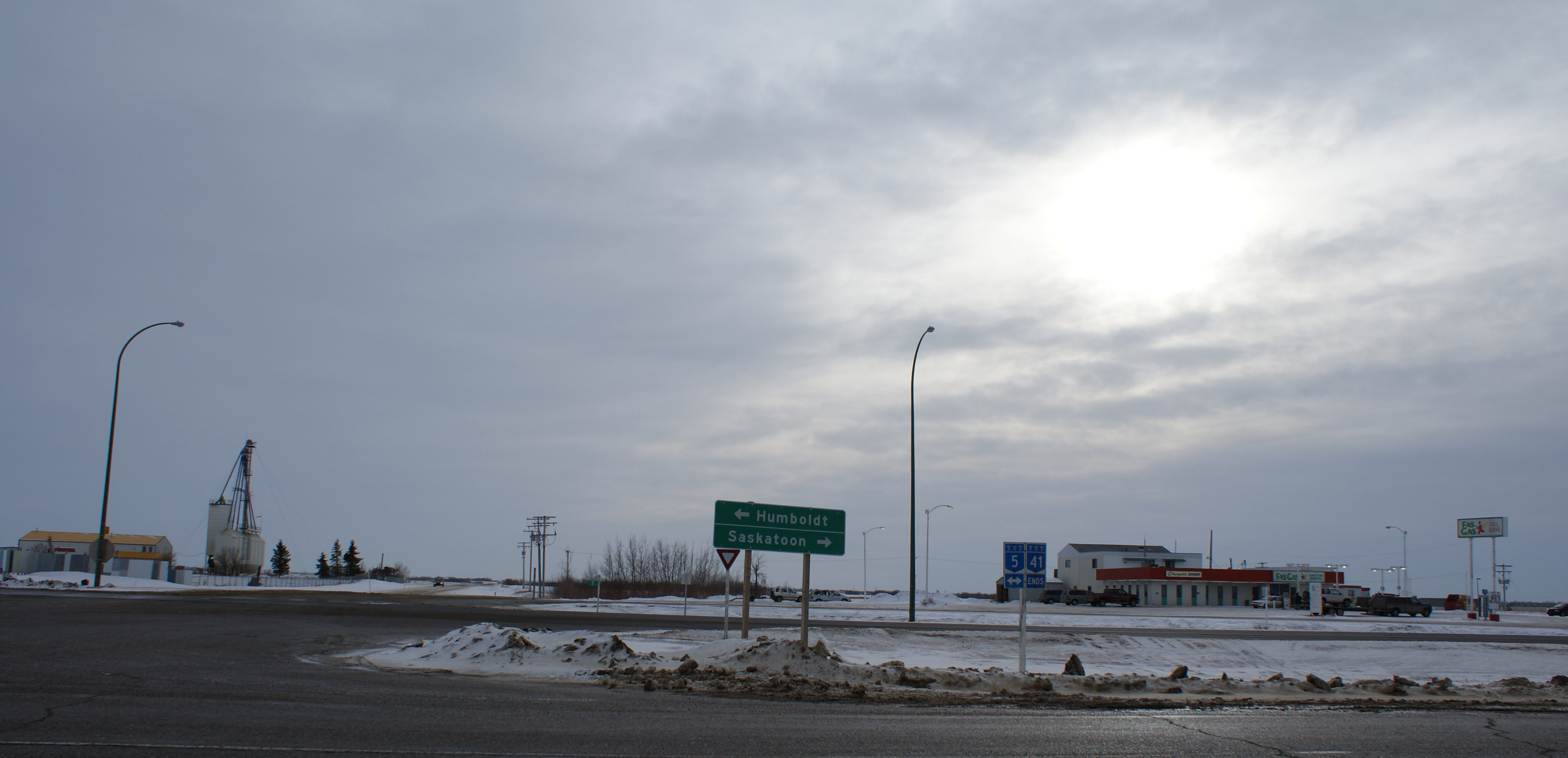
Highway 41 ends at the intersection with Highway 5

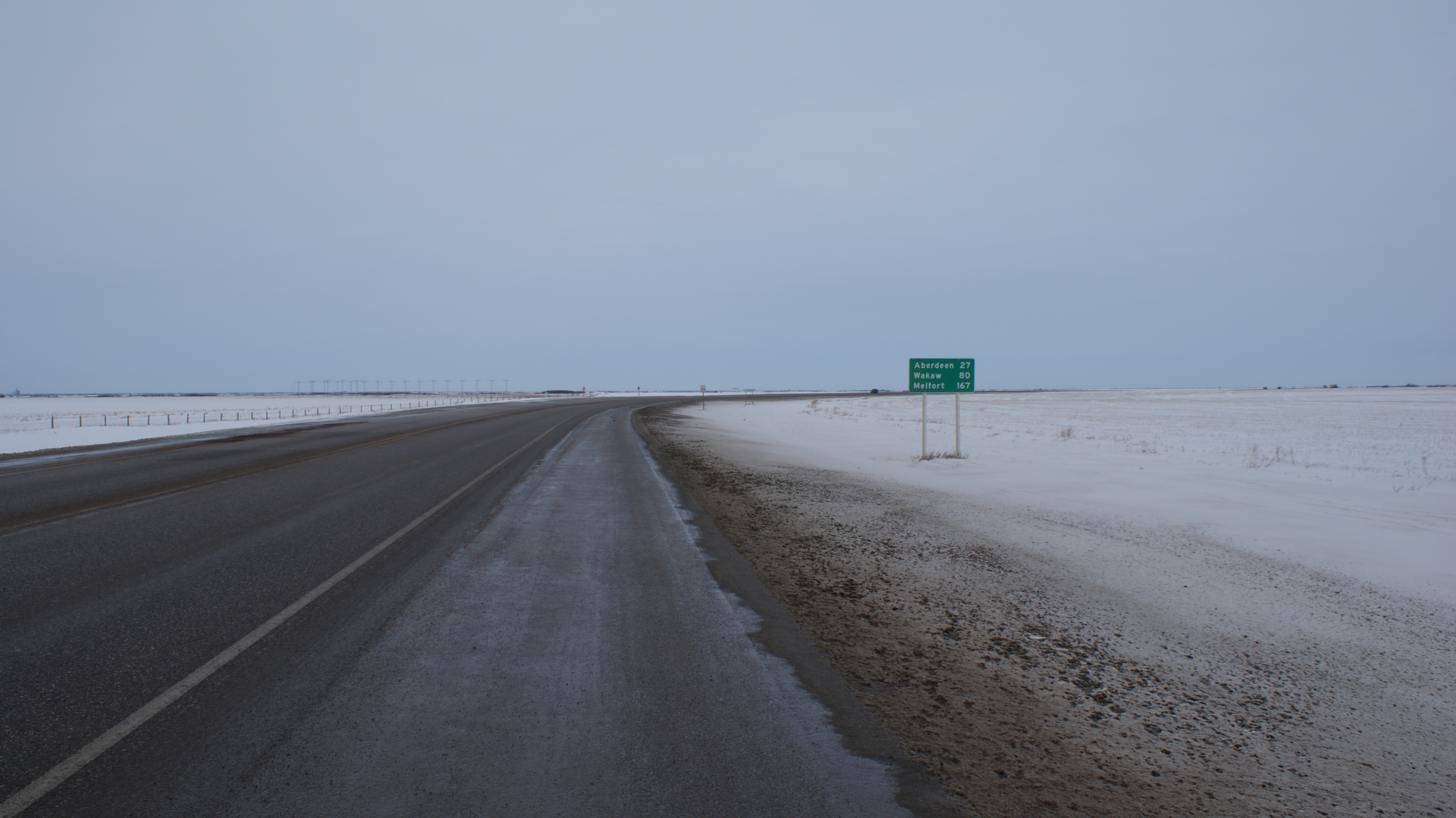
Highway 41

Inside Saskatoon's eastern city limits, Highway 41 begins at Highway 5. At Km 2.9, Highway 41 heads north-east and crosses Llewellin Road, exiting Saskatoon's city limits. The Agra Road intersection is at Km 4.2. Continuing north-east, Highway 41 meets with Bettken Road at Km 9.8. The intersection with Highway 27 is at Aberdeen. Alvena can be accessed at Km 40.1. One Arrow 95-1C Indian reserve is north of the highway at Km 61.9. Travel continues north-east arriving at the Highway 22 intersection at Km 78.0. Highway 312 is just north of this intersection meeting with Highway 22. Travel west along Highway 312 will traverse the South Saskatchewan River via the Gabriel Bridge. Travel continues on Highway 41 due east. The town of Wakaw and Wakaw Lake Regional Park are accessed via Highway 2. At Km 95.0, the highway returns to its north-east direction. The village of Reynaud is to the east of this mile point. At Km 107.8, Highway 41 intersects with Highway 20. Yellow Creek is located at Km 117.8; travel on Highway 41 is due east at this juncture. In approximately 19 kilometres (12 mi), the highway returns to its north-east direction. Meskanaw is located at Km 129.6. Travel along Highway 41 is now due east. There is a curve at Km 138.1 when Highway 41 meets with Highway 776 which continues the due east direction. Highway 41 travels in a north-east direction. At Km 148.5, Highway 41 intersects with Highway 368. Highway 3 and Highway 6, the CanAm Highway are travelling south and north as a concurrency when they intersect with Highway 41 south of the city of Melfort.

As of July 2010, several kilometres of Highway 41 were included in a large annexation of land undertaken by the city of Saskatoon.

== Major attractions ==
The Fish Creek Historical Site commemorates Major General Frederick Middleton's camp. The actual Battle of Fish Creek occurred 1 mile (1.6 km) south-east of this camp. The Clarkboro Ferry crosses the South Saskatchewan River near the old ferry crossing which was named Clarke's Crossing. Clarke's Crossing was used by General Middleton's troops when travelling to the Fish Creek Battle en route from North Battleford. There is a marker on the Edenburg road which pays tribute to Clarke's Crossing Ferry service. The city of Melfort provides a campground at the highway junction of Highway 3, the CanAm, and Highway 41. The historical Melfort power house has been renovated for the Melfort and District Museum.

== History ==
Highway 41 was established in the 1960s, and by 1972 it ran from Highway 5 just east of Saskatoon to Aberdeen, replacing a section of Highway 27 which followed Range Road 3030. In the 1970s, Highway 41 was extended northwest to Highway 2 at Wakaw. In 1987, the alignment of its eastern extension to Melfort was finalized where Highway 41 would aligned along an existing municipal road and connect with the Highway 3/6 junction, while a new route designated as Highway 41A would be constructed to connect with Highway 3 on the west side of the city. The highway was operational by 1989.

== Major intersections ==
From west to east:

| Rural municipality | Location | km | mi | Destinations | Notes |
|---|---|---|---|---|---|
| City of Saskatoon | | 0.0 | 0.0 | Highway 5 (College Drive) – Humboldt, City Centre | Western terminus |
| Corman Park No. 344 | No major junctions | | | | |
| Aberdeen No. 373 | Aberdeen | 24.1 | 15.0 | Highway 785 north – Hague Ferry | |
| Aberdeen No. 373 | Aberdeen | 26.9 | 16.7 | Highway 27 east – Vonda, Prud'homme Highway 784 west – Clarkboro Ferry | |
| Grant No. 372 | | 43.5 | 27.0 | Highway 671 south – Vonda, St. Denis | |
| Grant No. 372 | | 44.3 | 27.5 | Highway 767 east | |
| Fish Creek No. 402 | Alvena | 55.9 | 34.7 | Highway 777 east – Cudworth | |
| ↑ / ↓ | Wakaw | 77.9 | 48.4 | Highway 2 (Veterans Memorial Highway) to Highway 312 – Prince Albert, Moose Jaw | |
| Hoodoo No. 401 Three Lakes No. 400 | No major junctions | | | | |
| Invergordon No. 430 | | 107.6 | 66.9 | Highway 20 – Birch Hills, Humboldt | |
| Invergordon No. 430 | Meskanaw | 128.1 | 79.6 | Highway 682 north – Kinistino | |
| Flett's Springs No. 429 | Ethelton | 137.9 | 85.7 | Highway 776 east – Bjorkdale | |
| Flett's Springs No. 429 | | 148.2 | 92.1 | Highway 368 – Beatty, St. Brieux | |
| Flett's Springs No. 429 | | 158.5 | 98.5 | Highway 41A east (Melfort Business Loop) to Highway 6 north / Howell Road | |
| City of Melfort | | 163.4 | 101.5 | Highway 3 / Highway 6 / CanAm Highway / Highway 41A west (Melfort Business Loop) – Tisdale, Gronlid, Prince Albert, Regina | Eastern terminus; continues as Highway 3 east |
1.000 mi = 1.609 km; 1.000 km = 0.621 mi

== Highway 41A ==
Highway 41A
- Location: Melfort
- Length: 8.4 km (5.2 mi)
- Existed: 1988–present

Highway 41A is a spur route of Highway 41. It runs from Highway 41 to the CanAm Highway (Highway 3 / Highway 6) along the eastern edge of Melfort, serving as a business loop through downtown. It is about 8.4 kilometres (5.2 mi) long.

Major intersections

| Location | km | mi | Destinations | Notes |
|---|---|---|---|---|
| Flett's Springs No. 429 | 0.0 | 0.0 | Highway 41 – Tisdale, Saskatoon | Western terminus |
| Melfort | 3.4 | 2.1 | Highway 3 west / CanAm Highway (Saskatchewan Drive W) – Prince Albert | West end of Highway 3 concurrency |
| Melfort | 5.1 | 3.2 | Broadway Avenue N (Highway 6 north) – Gronlid, Wapiti Valley Regional Park | West end of Highway 6 concurrency |
| Melfort | 8.4 | 5.2 | Highway 3 east / Highway 41 west – Tisdale, Saskatoon Highway 6 south / CanAm Highway – Regina | Eastern terminus; continues as Highway 6 |
1.000 mi = 1.609 km; 1.000 km = 0.621 mi: Concurrency terminus

== See also ==
- Transportation in Saskatchewan
- Roads in Saskatchewan
