= Meskanaw, Saskatchewan =

Coordinates: 52.783°N 105.083°W

Meskanaw (/ˈmɛskənɔː/) is a small community south west of Melfort, Saskatchewan. Meskanaw is the Cree word for 'trail' or 'road'.

== History ==
The first settlers came to Meskanaw in the late 1890s. Mr. W. E. Traill was the first inhabitant of the town.

== Demographics ==
In the 2021 Census of Population conducted by Statistics Canada, Meskanaw had a population of 15 living in 8 of its 10 total private dwellings, a change of -25% from its 2016 population of 20. With a land area of 0.07 km^{2} (0.027 sq mi), it had a population density of 214.3/km^{2} (555.0/sq mi) in 2021.
