= Cudsaskwa Beach =

Community in Saskatchewan, Canada

Coordinates: 52°39′11″N 105°37′33″W

Cudsaskwa Beach is a hamlet in the Canadian province of Saskatchewan. It is a resort community on the northern shore of Wakaw Lake. The name Cudsaskwa is a combination of Cudworth (a nearby town), Saskatchewan, and Wakaw Lake.

== Demographics ==
In the 2021 Census of Population conducted by Statistics Canada, Cudsaskwa Beach had a population of 61 living in 32 of its 86 total private dwellings, a change of 17.3% from its 2016 population of 52. With a land area of 0.05 km^{2} (0.019 sq mi), it had a population density of 1,220.0/km^{2} (3,159.8/sq mi) in 2021.

== See also ==
- List of communities in Saskatchewan
- List of geographic acronyms and initialisms
