= Wakaw Lake =

Lake in Saskatchewan, Canada

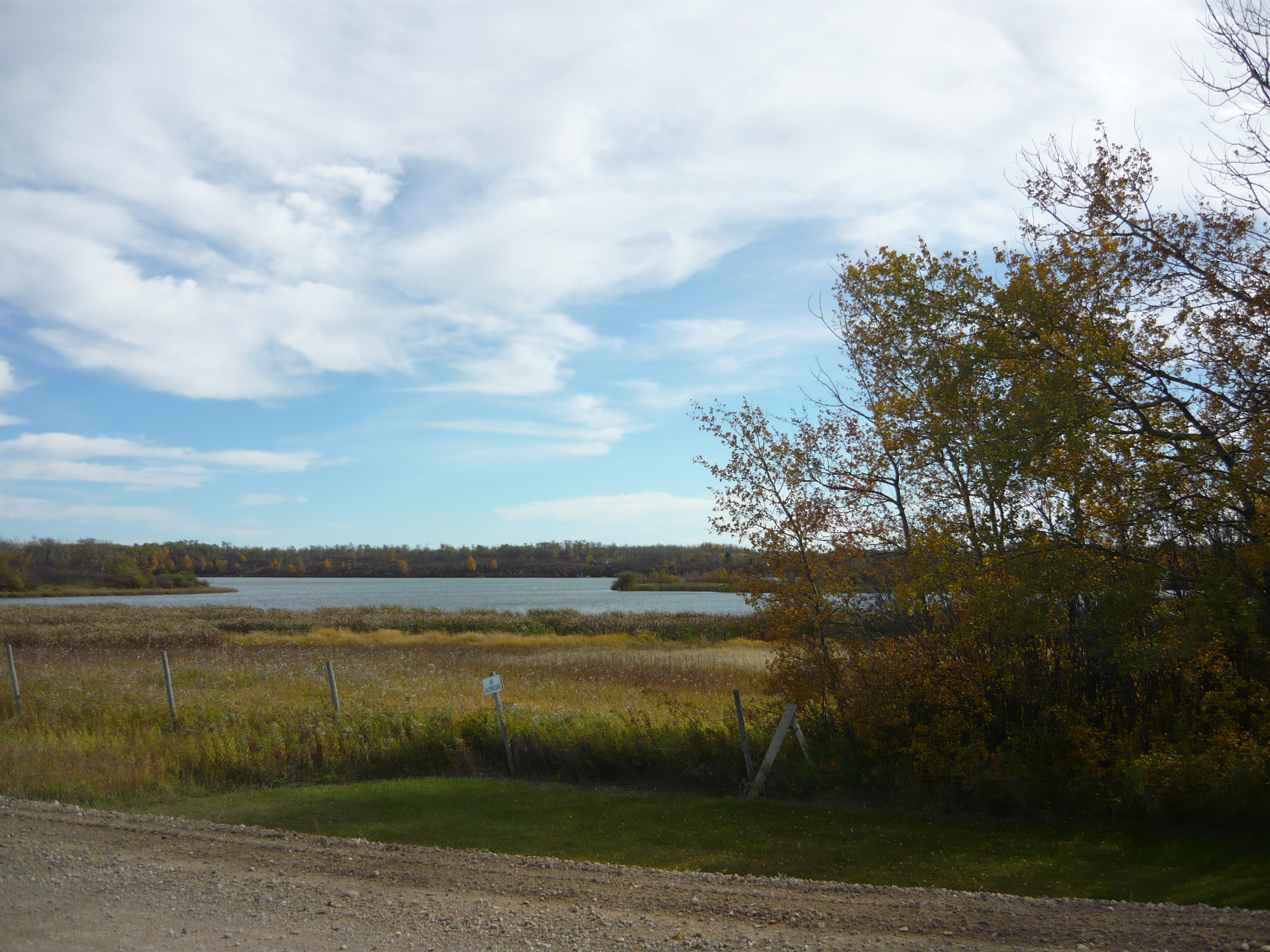

- Location in Saskatchewan Wakaw Lake (Canada)
- Location: RM of Hoodoo No. 401, near Wakaw, Saskatchewan
- Coordinates: 52.6689°N 105.5951°W
- Part of: Saskatchewan River drainage basin
- Primary outflows: Carrot River
- Basin countries: Canada
- Max. length: 19 km (12 mi)
- Surface area: 1,158.1 ha (2,862 acres)
- Average depth: 538 m (1,765 ft)
- Max. depth: 11.9 m (39 ft)
- Shore length^{1}: 48.8 km (30.3 mi)
- Surface elevation: 539 m (1,768 ft)
- Settlements: Wakaw Lake
- ^{1} Shore length is not a well-defined measure.

Wakaw Lake is a lake in the RM of Hoodoo No. 401 in the central part of the Canadian province of Saskatchewan. It is about 102 kilometres (63 mi) north-east of Saskatoon and 73 kilometres (45 mi) south of Prince Albert. It takes its name from a Cree word meaning "crooked", referring to the curved shape of the lake. The lake is known in Cree as ᐚᑳᐤ ᓵᑲᐦᐃᑲᐣ wâkâw sâkahikan. Wakaw Lake is the source of the Carrot River, which is a 300-kilometre (190 mi) long river that parallels the South Saskatchewan and Saskatchewan Rivers before meeting the Saskatchewan River at The Pas, Manitoba.

Communities along the lake's shore include Wakaw Lake, Nelson Beach, Nickorick Beach, Cudsaskwa Beach, Balone Beach, Domremy Beach, and Berard Beach. There are currently about 800 cabins located on the lake, some of which are winterised and occupied year-round. The town of Wakaw is about 1 kilometre (0.62 mi) west of the western end of Wakaw Lake.

== Wakaw Lake Regional Park ==
Wakaw Lake Regional Park (52.6641°N 105.6096°W) has a campground with over 150 campsites, a 9-hole golf course, mini golf, picnic area, boat launch and refuelling station, beach, and a licensed restaurant. While not a deep lake, it still suffices for some watersports.

Wakaw Lake Golf Club is a 9-hole, par 72 course with grass greens and 6,244 total yards.

Wakaw Lake Regional Park won Saskatchewan's Park of the Year Award in 2025.

== Fish species ==
Fish species commonly found in Wakaw Lake include northern pike, walleye, and perch.

== See also ==
- List of protected areas of Saskatchewan
- List of lakes of Saskatchewan
- Tourism in Saskatchewan
