= Vonda =

Vonda is a given name. Notable people with the name include:

- Vonda Kay Van Dyke, crowned the 1965 Miss America on September 13, 1964
- Vonda N. McIntyre (1948–2019), American science fiction author
- Vonda Phelps, American child stage actress and dancer in the 1920s
- Vonda Shepard (born 1963), American pop/rock singer
- Vonda Ward (born 1973), American female boxer and NCAA basketball player

== See also ==
- Vonda, Saskatchewan, located on Highway 27, a half-hour drive north east of Saskatoon, Saskatchewan
