= Lake Lenore, Saskatchewan =

Village in Saskatchewan, Canada

Lake Lenore
- Village
- Village of Lake Lenore
- Location of Lake Lenore in Saskatchewan Lake Lenore (Canada)
- Coordinates: 52.393°N 104.941°W
- Country: Canada
- Province: Saskatchewan
- Region: Central
- Census division: 15
- Rural Municipality: St. Peter No. 369
- Post office Founded: 1906

Government
  - Type: Municipal
  - Governing body: Lake Lenore Village Council
  - Mayor: Brie Schemenauer
  - Administrator: Connie Corderro

Area
  - Total: 0.97 km^{2} (0.37 sq mi)

Population (2021)
  - Total: 265
  - Density: 273.2/km^{2} (708/sq mi)
- Time zone: UTC-6 (CST)
- Postal code: S0K 2J0
- Area code: 306
- Highways: Highway 368; Highway 777
- Railways: Canadian National Railway
- Website: Village of Lake Lenore

Lake Lenore (2021 population: 265) is a village in the Canadian province of Saskatchewan within the Rural Municipality of St. Peter No. 369 and Census Division No. 15. The village is about 144 kilometres (89 mi) northeast of the city of Saskatoon. To the north of the village is Lenore Lake, which is designated as a migratory bird sanctuary, an Important Bird Area (IBA) of Canada, and has a National Wildlife Area on Raven Island. Services in Lake Lenore include a school, Co-op Grocery and Agro Service Station, a Credit Union, and Public Library.

== History ==
The first home built in Lake Lenore was built by Bernard Gerwing and he is considered a founder of the community. Later on the community would shift a half a kilometre to be closer to the railroad. Bernard Gerwing's home would become abandoned in 1916-1917, it was made into a historical site by the community and is preserved to this day. Lake Lenore incorporated as a village on April 28, 1921. Lake Lenore was previously known as Lenore Lake before the name was changed in the 1920s due to a mistake made in the books of the railway company. Lake Lenore is a primarily German community.

== Demographics ==
Population history (1981–2016)
Year	Pop.	±%
1981	361	—
1986	370	+2.5%
1991	336	−9.2%
1996	290	−13.7%
2001	314	+8.3%
2006	306	−2.5%
2011	297	−2.9%
2016	284	−4.4%
Source: Statistics Canada via Saskatchewan Bureau of Statistics

In the 2021 Census of Population conducted by Statistics Canada, Lake Lenore had a population of 289 living in 116 of its 135 total private dwellings, a change of 1.8% from its 2016 population of 284. With a land area of 0.97 km^{2} (0.37 sq mi), it had a population density of 297.9/km^{2} (771.7/sq mi) in 2021.

In the 2016 Census of Population, the Village of Lake Lenore recorded a population of 284 living in 117 of its 128 total private dwellings, a −4.6% change from its 2011 population of 297. With a land area of 0.97 km^{2} (0.37 sq mi), it had a population density of 292.8/km^{2} (758.3/sq mi) in 2016.

== See also ==
- List of communities in Saskatchewan
- List of villages in Saskatchewan
