= Rural Municipality of Lake Lenore No. 399 =

Rural municipality in Saskatchewan, Canada

Lake Lenore No. 399
- Rural municipality
- Rural Municipality of Lake Lenore No. 399
- Location of the RM of Lake Lenore No. 399 in Saskatchewan
- Coordinates: 52.589°N 104.842°W
- Country: Canada
- Province: Saskatchewan
- Census division: 15
- SARM division: 5
- Formed: January 1, 1913

Government
  - Reeve: Jean Kernaleguen
  - Governing body: RM of Lake Lenore No. 399 Council
  - Administrator: Jolynne Gallays
  - Office location: St. Brieux

Area (2016)
  - Land: 723.53 km^{2} (279.36 sq mi)

Population (2016)
  - Total: 587
  - Density: 0.8/km^{2} (2.1/sq mi)
- Time zone: CST
  - Summer (DST): CST
- Area codes: 306 and 639

The Rural Municipality of Lake Lenore No. 399 (2016 population: 587) is a rural municipality (RM) in the Canadian province of Saskatchewan within Census Division No. 15 and SARM Division No. 5.

== History ==
The RM of Lake Lenore No. 399 incorporated as a rural municipality on January 1, 1913.

== Geography ==
=== Communities and localities ===
The following urban municipalities are surrounded by the RM.

Villages

- St. Brieux

The following unincorporated communities are within the RM.

Localities

- Daylesford
- St. James

== Demographics ==
Population history (1981–2016)
Year	Pop.	±%
1981	624	—
1986	568	−9.0%
1991	579	+1.9%
1996	555	−4.1%
2001	501	−9.7%
2006	513	+2.4%
2011	536	+4.5%
2016	587	+9.5%
Source: Statistics Canada via Saskatchewan Bureau of Statistics

In the 2021 Census of Population conducted by Statistics Canada, the RM of Lake Lenore No. 399 had a population of 506 living in 179 of its 279 total private dwellings, a change of −13.8% from its 2016 population of 587. With a land area of 714.17 km^{2} (275.74 sq mi), it had a population density of 0.7/km^{2} (1.8/sq mi) in 2021.

In the 2016 Census of Population, the RM of Lake Lenore No. 399 recorded a population of 587 living in 214 of its 290 total private dwellings, a 9.5% change from its 2011 population of 536. With a land area of 723.53 km^{2} (279.36 sq mi), it had a population density of 0.8/km^{2} (2.1/sq mi) in 2016.

== Attractions ==
- Lenore Lake
- St. Brieux Regional Park
- St. Brieux Museum

== Government ==
The RM of Lake Lenore No. 399 is governed by an elected municipal council and an appointed administrator that meets on the second Wednesday of every month. The reeve of the RM is Jean Kernaleguen while its administrator is Jolynne Gallays. The RM's office is located in St. Brieux.

== Transportation ==
- Saskatchewan Highway 368
- Saskatchewan Highway 773
- Saskatchewan Highway 777
- Canadian National Railway

== See also ==
- List of rural municipalities in Saskatchewan
