= Edenburg, Saskatchewan =

Community in Saskatchewan, Canada

Coordinates: 52°20′50.9″N 106°21′49.5″W

Edenburg is an unincorporated community located about 4 miles northwest of the town of Aberdeen, Saskatchewan in Canada. Edenburg has a population of 30, and is a mixed use residential/agricultural area.

== History ==
Edenburg is a living example of the settlement preferences of the Mennonites, originally from northern Germany (Prussia) who emigrated to Canada via Russia. Although governmental policy of the day required the farmers to take up residence on their own homestead quarter (a portion of land 1/2 mile square), the Mennonites preferred and sometimes were given governmental exemption to live in communities similar to those they had left in Europe.

Thus, Edenburg and many other such communities sprang up with narrow frontages on the roadway, yet had their back boundaries set rather far from the edge of the road. The effect is similar to the river lots favoured in Quebec, and by the Métis people.

In 1902, just as the Canadian Northern Railways was constructed past Aberdeen, Jacob Unrau and his family came from Manitoba. He homesteaded the north-west quarter of section 14, township 39, range 3, west of the third meridian but bought 15-39-3-3 of what Canada had given the railways. He founded Edenburg on this section, giving each of his children, as they married, a strip of land and built a church and a graveyard.

In 1904, daughter Anna married Cornelius A. Ens and was given one such lot. Anna, who died in childbirth with her child Isaac in 1913, was an early entry into the graveyard. Ens established a store in 1918.

Edenburg was situated on an east–west road, and gradually people settled across the road and completed the community. Until 1921 Edenburg had its own school taught in German, for its students and Mennonites in neighbouring farms.

== Social services ==
As of 2005, neither schooling nor business are carried on any more in Edenburg though some farm the surrounding land, with residents travelling to Aberdeen or to Saskatoon for most commercial and educational matters or to commute to work.

== See also ==
- List of communities in Saskatchewan
