= Pathlow, Saskatchewan =

Coordinates: 52°43′00″N 104°48′02″W

Pathlow is a hamlet in the Canadian province of Saskatchewan. Listed as a designated place by Statistics Canada, the hamlet had a population of 15 in the Canada 2006 Census.

Originally settled in the year 1766, Pathlow was one of the first permanent settlements in Saskatchewan as Eastern Europeans traveled west in search North American resources, herbs, and spices. The surrounding area of Pathlow, became quickly settled, due to its large quantity of farm land. Shortly after, circa 1890, more settlers arrived to the surrounding area. At its peak, the hamlet had nearly 400 people.
