= Melfort, Saskatchewan =

City in Saskatchewan, Canada

Melfort
- City
- City of Melfort
- Coat of arms
- Motto: From Many Builders One Community
- Location within Saskatchewan Location within Canada
- Coordinates: 52°51′23″N 104°36′36″W
- Country: Canada
- Province: Saskatchewan
- Post office established: August 1, 1892
- Incorporated Village: 1903
- Incorporated Town: July 1, 1907
- Incorporated City: September 2, 1980

Government
  - Mayor: Glenn George
  - MLA Melfort: Todd Goudy
  - MP Prince Albert: Randy Hoback
- Elevation: 480.10 m (1,575.1 ft)

Population (2016)
  - Total: 5,992
  - Density: 405.4/km^{2} (1,050/sq mi)
- Time zone: UTC−06:00 (CST)
- Highways: CanAm Highway / Highway 3 / Highway 6 / Highway 41 / Highway 41A
- Website: www.melfort.ca

Melfort (2016 population 5,992) is a city in Saskatchewan, Canada, located approximately 95 kilometres (59 mi) southeast of Prince Albert, 172 kilometres (107 mi) northeast of Saskatoon, and 280 kilometres (170 mi) north of Regina.

Melfort became Saskatchewan's 12th city in 1980. Melfort was formerly called the "City of Northern Lights" due to the frequency with which the aurora borealis appears. However, in 2016, Melfort became "Play Melfort" due to its vast recreation programs and facilities.

The city is bordered by the Rural Municipality of Star City No. 428 and the Rural Municipality of Flett's Springs No. 429. It is also the administrative headquarters of the Peter Chapman First Nation band government.

== History ==
A few kilometres southeast of current location of Melfort settlers established themselves on the banks of Stoney Creek before relocation due to the surveying of the Canadian Northern Railway. Melfort was named to honour Mrs. Reginald Beatty (née Mary Campbell, 1856–1916), wife of one of the early settlers (1884). She was born on the Melfort estate, south of Oban, in Argyllshire, Scotland.

Melfort's first post office was established August 1, 1892, in the provisional district of the North West Territories with Benjamin Rothwell as the first postmaster.

The community became a village on November 4, 1903, and incorporated as a town July 1, 1907. It finally became the twelfth city of Saskatchewan on September 2, 1980.

Three one-room school houses used the name "Melfort". Melfort School District No. 54, later called Tiger Lily No. 54 17, near Pleasantdale. (Pleasantdale post office was previously named Windgap and was located at Township 41, Range 18 west of the 2nd Meridian). Melfort School District No. 318 was established in 1904 at Clemens, Rural Route 1, Melfort. Melfort School District No. 1037 was the last one-room school house to use this name.

== Geography ==
Melfort is on the banks of Melfort Creek in the Carrot River Valley. The valley is noted for its black loamy soil and productive agricultural lands. The drainage region for Melfort is the Lower Saskatchewan – Nelson and the area is characterized by a prairie ecozone. The Tiger Hills Uplands ecozone provides rich soil to grow a diversity of crops. Melfort Research Farm is located south of Melfort in the Boreal Shield ecozone and the Churchill drainage basin. The farm's main purpose is to research crops and crop systems for northern prairie black and grey soil zones. The Melfort branch of the Canadian Legion has assembled a photographic display of the geographic memorials designated to honour the war dead.

== Demographics ==
In the 2021 Census of Population conducted by Statistics Canada, Melfort had a population of 5,955 living in 2,575 of its 2,788 total private dwellings, a change of −0.6% from its 2016 population of 5,992. With a land area of 14.73 km^{2} (5.69 sq mi), it had a population density of 404.3/km^{2} (1,047.1/sq mi) in 2021.

Historical populations
Year	Pop.	±%
1906	351	—
1910	599	+70.7%
1916	971	+62.1%
1996	5,759	+493.1%
2001	5,559	−3.5%
2006	5,192	−6.6%
2011	5,576	+7.4%
2016	5,992	+7.5%
2021	5,955	−0.6%

Canada census – Melfort community profile

	2021	2016	2011
Population	5,955 (-0.6% from 2016)	5,992 (7.5% from 2011)	5,576 (7.4% from 2006)
Land area	14.73 km^{2} (5.69 sq mi)	14.78 km^{2} (5.71 sq mi)	14.78 km^{2} (5.71 sq mi)
Population density	404.2/km^{2} (1,047/sq mi)	405.4/km^{2} (1,050/sq mi)	377.3/km^{2} (977/sq mi)
Median age	42.8 (M: 39.6, F: 45.6)		43.8 (M: 41.3, F: 45.5)
Private dwellings	2,788 (total) 2,575 (occupied)	2,691 (total)	2,464 (total)
Median household income	$71,500

References: 2021 2016 2011

Panethnic groups in the City of Melfort (2001−2021)
Panethnic group	2021		2016		2011		2006		2001	
Panethnic group	Pop.	%	Pop.	%	Pop.	%	Pop.	%	Pop.	%
European (Note: Statistic includes all persons that did not make up part of a visible minority or an indigenous identity.)	4,580	78.83%	4,730	80.85%	4,745	88.03%	4,710	93.18%	4,815	89.75%
Indigenous	725	12.48%	705	12.05%	400	7.42%	310	6.13%	430	8.01%
Southeast Asian (Note: Statistic includes total responses of "Filipino" and "Southeast Asian" under visible minority section on census.)	390	6.71%	295	5.04%	40	0.74%	0	0%	15	0.28%
South Asian	35	0.6%	15	0.26%	70	1.3%	0	0%	0	0%
East Asian (Note: Statistic includes total responses of "Chinese", "Korean", and "Japanese" under visible minority section on census.)	20	0.34%	50	0.85%	85	1.58%	15	0.3%	100	1.86%
African	20	0.34%	40	0.68%	30	0.56%	20	0.4%	10	0.19%
Latin American	0	0%	10	0.17%	15	0.28%	0	0%	0	0%
Middle Eastern (Note: Statistic includes total responses of "West Asian" and "Arab" under visible minority section on census.)	0	0%	0	0%	0	0%	0	0%	0	0%
Other/multiracial (Note: Statistic includes total responses of "Visible minority, n.i.e." and "Multiple visible minorities" under visible minority section on census.)	20	0.34%	0	0%	0	0%	0	0%	0	0%
Total responses	5,810	97.57%	5,850	97.63%	5,390	96.66%	5,055	97.36%	5,365	96.51%
Total population	5,955	100%	5,992	100%	5,576	100%	5,192	100%	5,559	100%
Note: Totals greater than 100% due to multiple origin responses

== Climate ==
Melfort experiences a humid continental climate (Köppen climate classification Dfb). The highest temperature ever recorded in Melfort was 41.1 °C (106 °F) on 19 July 1941. The coldest temperature ever recorded was −47.2 °C (−53 °F) on 28 January 1966.

Climate data for Melfort CDA, 1981–2010 normals, extremes 1901–present (Note: Climate data was recorded in the town of Melfort from October 1901 to December 1960 and at the Melfort Canadian Department of Agriculture from January 1961 to present.)
Month	Jan	Feb	Mar	Apr	May	Jun	Jul	Aug	Sep	Oct	Nov	Dec	Year
Record high °C (°F)	8.5 (47.3)	10.6 (51.1)	20.0 (68.0)	32.2 (90.0)	35.0 (95.0)	39.0 (102.2)	41.1 (106.0)	38.3 (100.9)	37.2 (99.0)	32.2 (90.0)	20.0 (68.0)	11.1 (52.0)	41.1 (106.0)
Mean daily maximum °C (°F)	−12.2 (10.0)	−9.5 (14.9)	−2.2 (28.0)	8.2 (46.8)	17.2 (63.0)	22.3 (72.1)	23.6 (74.5)	23.5 (74.3)	16.8 (62.2)	8.3 (46.9)	−4.3 (24.3)	−10.9 (12.4)	6.7 (44.1)
Daily mean °C (°F)	−17.2 (1.0)	−14.2 (6.4)	−6.9 (19.6)	2.8 (37.0)	10.7 (51.3)	15.9 (60.6)	17.5 (63.5)	16.8 (62.2)	10.8 (51.4)	3.3 (37.9)	−8.1 (17.4)	−15.4 (4.3)	1.3 (34.3)
Mean daily minimum °C (°F)	−22.0 (−7.6)	−18.8 (−1.8)	−11.5 (11.3)	−2.6 (27.3)	4.1 (39.4)	9.4 (48.9)	11.3 (52.3)	10.0 (50.0)	4.7 (40.5)	−1.7 (28.9)	−11.7 (10.9)	−19.9 (−3.8)	−4.1 (24.6)
Record low °C (°F)	−47.2 (−53.0)	−45.6 (−50.1)	−40.0 (−40.0)	−35.0 (−31.0)	−13.3 (8.1)	−4.4 (24.1)	−6.7 (19.9)	−5.6 (21.9)	−13.9 (7.0)	−24.4 (−11.9)	−36.5 (−33.7)	−44.4 (−47.9)	−47.2 (−53.0)
Average precipitation mm (inches)	14.5 (0.57)	10.2 (0.40)	17.2 (0.68)	26.7 (1.05)	42.9 (1.69)	54.3 (2.14)	76.7 (3.02)	52.4 (2.06)	38.7 (1.52)	27.9 (1.10)	16.5 (0.65)	17.8 (0.70)	395.8 (15.58)
Average rainfall mm (inches)	0.5 (0.02)	0.3 (0.01)	1.3 (0.05)	14.6 (0.57)	39.8 (1.57)	54.3 (2.14)	76.7 (3.02)	52.4 (2.06)	34.3 (1.35)	14.8 (0.58)	1.5 (0.06)	0.4 (0.02)	290.8 (11.45)
Average snowfall cm (inches)	14.3 (5.6)	10.3 (4.1)	16.0 (6.3)	12.2 (4.8)	3.0 (1.2)	0.0 (0.0)	0.0 (0.0)	0.0 (0.0)	4.4 (1.7)	13.2 (5.2)	15.0 (5.9)	17.5 (6.9)	106.0 (41.7)
Mean monthly sunshine hours	87.5	116.7	152.2	203.7	250.4	259.0	281.1	262.2	167.7	137.0	79.4	66.5	2,063.3
Percentage possible sunshine	34.4	42.1	41.5	48.8	51.2	51.4	55.5	57.4	44.0	41.5	30.2	27.8	43.8
Source: Environment Canada

== Economy ==
The Agriculture Melfort Research Station is centred in Melfort along with many other agriculturally based industries.

The Melfort Research Farm near Melfort was established in 1935 by the Federal Minister of Agriculture. It is one of the three field sites of the Saskatoon Research Centre (SRC). SRC is one of nineteen research branches of Agriculture and Agri-Food Canada.

Melfort is near a large diamond exploration site. The ongoing diamond exploration by a joint venture between Shore Gold Inc. Newmont Mining Corporation of Canada in the Fort à la Corne district was expected to begin mine construction in 2012.

== Attractions ==
Within the city of Melfort is the Melfort Golf & Country Club, which hosts an 18-hole grass greens golf course, and the Spruce Haven picnic area. A show ring, grandstand, museum, and exhibition building are all located within the Melfort Exhibition Grounds. The Melfort & District Museum next door showcases pioneering equipment, tools, farm machinery, archival documents as well as early settler's buildings Neighbouring points of interest are Fort Carlton, Duck Lake, and Seager Wheeler's Maple Grove Farm.

== Sports and recreation ==
Melfort was home to the 2006 Saskatchewan Winter Games, the 1988 Saskatchewan Summer Games, the 1996 Royal Bank Cup Canadian Junior 'A' Hockey Championships, the 1995 Saskatchewan Men's Curling Pool Tankard finals and the 2002 Saskatchewan women's Scott Tournament of Hearts finals. The Kerry Vickar Centre, a multi purpose sports and leisure facility, opened in the autumn of 2009 The previous multi-use facility at that location, the North East Leisure Centre, was taken down to make way for the new Kerry Vickar Centre. Melfort offers countless recreational opportunities for families and friends including swimming, camping, skiing, fishing, and golfing, among other things.

=== Ice hockey ===
The Melfort Mustangs play in the Saskatchewan Junior Hockey League. The Mustangs are well known in Canadian hockey circles in many ways—for instance Marc Habscheid, past coach of Canada's World Junior team, started his coaching career with the Mustangs in 1996. Other notable Mustang alumni include Willie Mitchell of the Los Angeles Kings and Ruslan Fedetenko formerly of the Philadelphia Flyers.

== Government ==
Municipal affairs are handled by the city's mayor, Glenn George and council. City council currently consists of George and six councillors. The Rural Municipality of Flett's Springs No. 429 office is located on McDonald Avenue West in Melfort and provides municipal rural affairs to the small unincorporated areas of Claggett, Ethelton, Ethelton Airport, Flett Springs, Lipsett, McMichael, Melfort Airport, Minto Park, Pathlow, and Taylorside.

Melfort is in the federal electoral district of Prince Albert with their Member of Parliament being Randy Hoback.

Provincially, the area is within the constituency of Melfort with its MLA being Todd Goudy. He was preceded by Rod Gantefoer.

== Transportation ==
Melfort is located at the junction of two primary route highways, Highway 3 and Highway 6 where they meet with secondary Highway 41. Approximately 327 kilometres (203 mi) of Highway 6 contributes to the CanAm Highway between Corinne and Melfort. Approximately 96 kilometres (60 mi) of Highway 3 contribute to the CanAm Highway between Melfort and Prince Albert. Melfort is approximately 174 kilometres (108 mi) northeast of the largest provincial city, Saskatoon, along Highway 41 (turning onto Highway 5) and approximately 94 kilometres (58 mi) southeast of Prince Albert via the CanAm Highway.

Melfort (Miller Field) Aerodrome is west of Melfort.

In 1925, Melfort was listed as a Canadian Pacific Railway (CPR) station on the CPR Melfort Subdivision. Melfort is currently a CNR interchange point and railway station on the Tisdale, St. Brieux and Brooksby Subdivisions.

== Education ==
The government's Canada–Saskatchewan Career and Employment Services office was to be combined with Melfort's Comprehensive High School and the Cumberland Regional College. The Melfort and Unit Comprehensive Collegiate provides education to grades 7 to 12 and is a part of the North East School Division No. 200.

Historically, students in Melfort were educated at the Melfort School District Unit 54.

== Media ==
The Melfort Journal, owned by Postmedia Network, is the city's weekly newspaper.

Jim Pattison Group owns two radio stations in Melfort, country station CJVR-FM, and adult hits station CKJH.

== Notable people ==
- Martine Gaillard is a sports television personality currently working for Rogers Sportsnet
- Lorne Henning, born in Melfort, is a National Hockey League (NHL) hockey executive and was previously a player and coach in the NHL.
- Arthur Hill was an actor best known for appearances in British and American theatre, movies and television.
- Gordon Kirkby, born in Melfort, is a former mayor of Prince Albert (1988–1993) and Member of Parliament for Prince Albert—Churchill River (1993–1997).
- Lane Lambert, born in Melfort, is a retired professional ice hockey forward, uncle of Finnish-Canadian player Brad Lambert, and is currently the head coach of the Seattle Kraken of the NHL.
- Pat MacLeod, born in Melfort, is a former professional ice hockey defenceman who played in the NHL for the Minnesota North Stars, San Jose Sharks, and Dallas Stars in the 1990s.
- Jaden Schwartz, born in Melfort, is a current professional ice hockey forward who plays in the NHL for the Seattle Kraken.
- Nicole Watt, born in Melfort is a Canadian Women's figure skating Canadian silver medalist.
- Steven Woods, born in Melfort is an entrepreneur and co-founder of Quack.com, the first popular voice portal platform, in 1998.
- Logan Ferland, born in Melfort is an offensive lineman for the Saskatchewan Roughriders of the CFL, formerly of the Regina Thunder football club and the Melfort Comets football program.
- Tyson Strachan, born in Melfort, is a former NHL defenceman.

== See also ==
- List of communities in Saskatchewan
- List of cities in Saskatchewan
