= Wakaw =

Town in Saskatchewan, Canada

Town of Wakaw
- Town
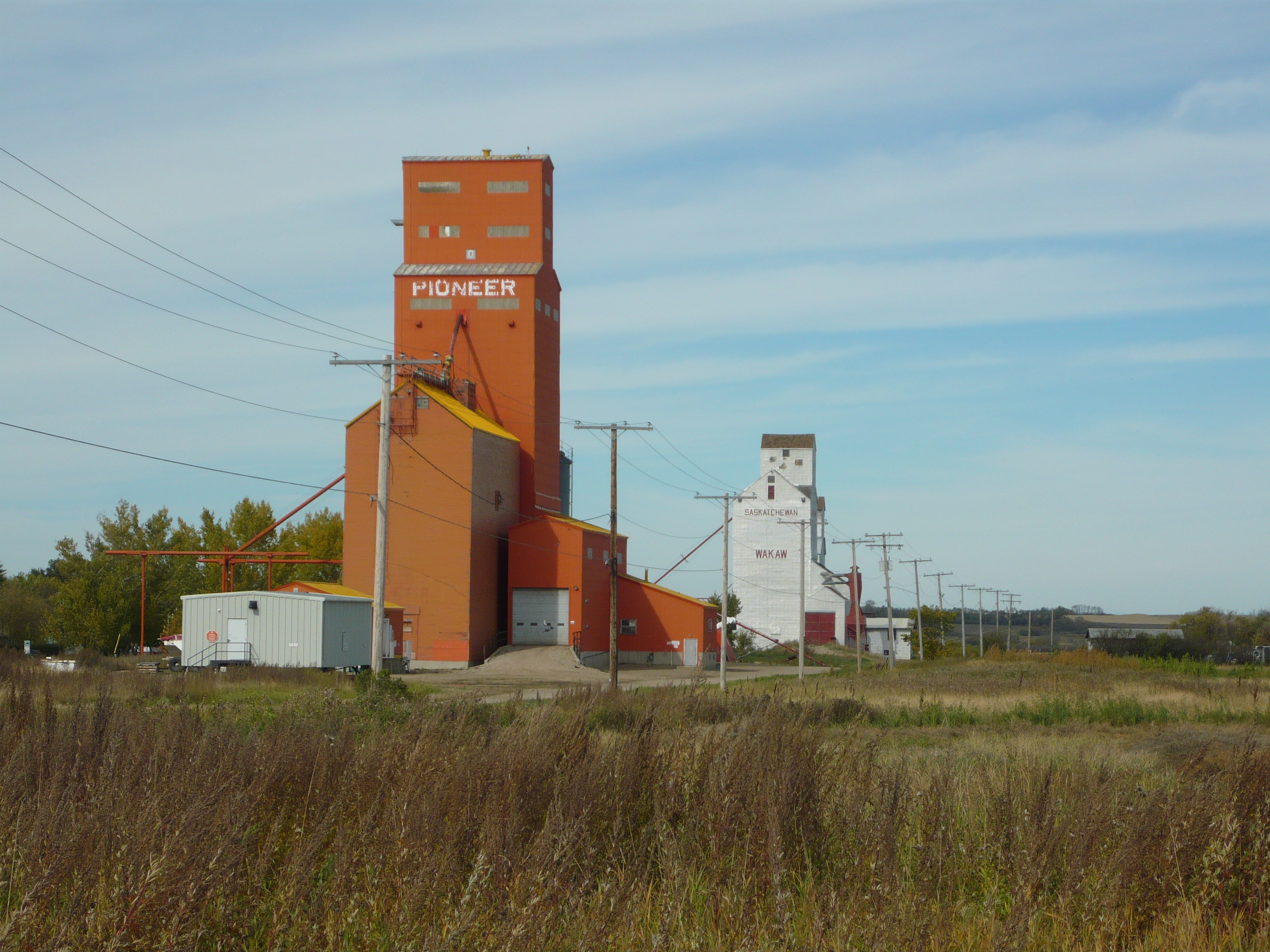
- Elevator Road (2009)

- Location of Wakaw in Saskatchewan Town of Wakaw (Canada)
- Coordinates: 52°38′38″N 105°44′6″W
- Country: Canada
- Province: Saskatchewan
- Census division: No. 15
- Rural Municipality: Hoodoo No. 401; Fish Creek No. 402
- Post office Founded: 1 May 1905
- Village Incorporated: 26 December 1911
- Town Incorporated: 1 August 1953

Government
  - Mayor: Michael Markowski
  - Administrator: Melissa Dieno
  - Governing body: Wakaw Town Council

Area
  - Land: 3.12 km^{2} (1.20 sq mi)

Population (2011)
  - Total: 985
- Time zone: CST
- Postal code: S0K 4P0
- Area code: 306
- Highways: Highway 2 Highway 41; Highway 312
- Website: Wakaw

Wakaw, Saskatchewan, is a town 90 kilometres (56 mi) northeast of Saskatoon and 66 kilometres (41 mi) south of Prince Albert. It is about halfway between the two cities and is served by Highway 2, Highway 41, and Highway 312. Wakaw is in hilly partially forested country east of the South Saskatchewan River. The area is part of the aspen parkland biome.

Wakaw is a Cree word meaning "crooked". The name was taken from nearby Wakaw Lake and applied to the town.

== History ==
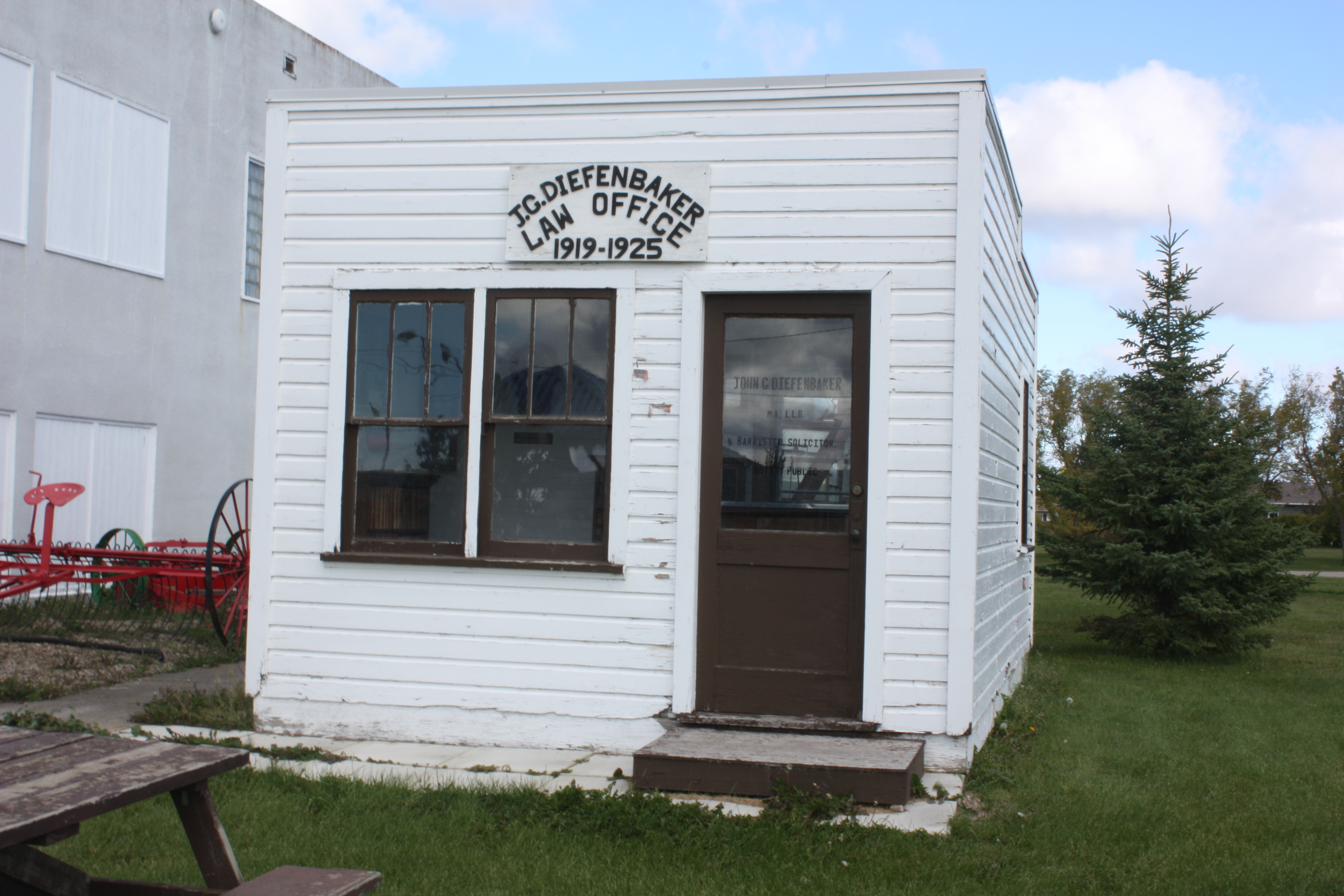
Re-creation of Diefenbaker's first office, Wakaw

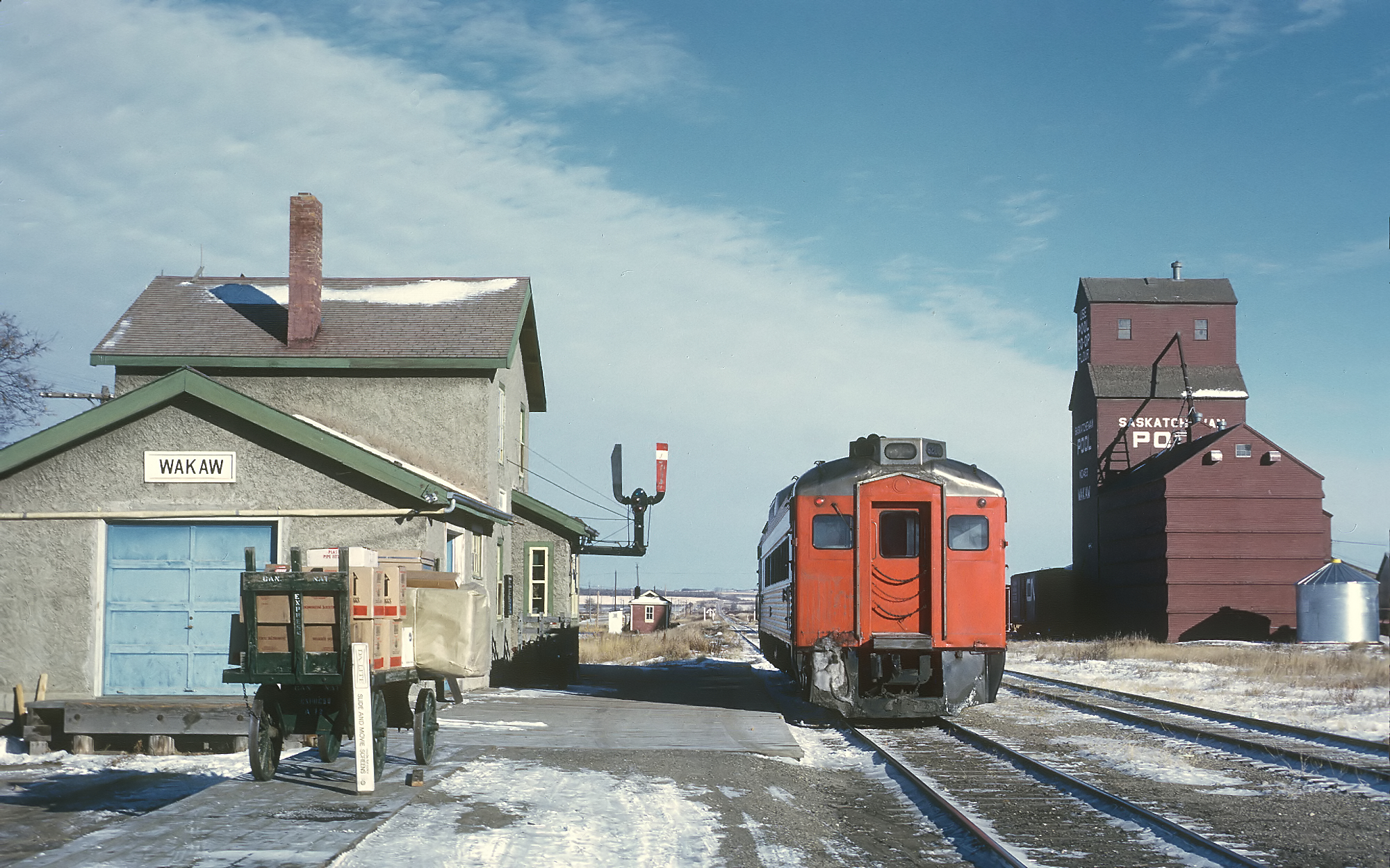
Canadian National 6208 RDC2 at Wakaw, 1950-1970

The area was peopled primarily by settlers of Eastern European origin. The town was home to Prime Minister John Diefenbaker and his first wife Edna Brower. Diefenbaker opened his first law office in Wakaw from 1919 to 1925.

Wakaw was founded on 26 December 1911 after 21 residents petitioned the Department of Municipal Affairs, asking for the incorporation of the Village of Wakaw. It was located on Section 30, Township 42, Range 26, west of the 2nd Meridian, land donated to the town by Anthony Goller who immigrated to Canada in 1902. When the railroad was built the town was moved to its present location. On 1 August 1953 Wakaw was incorporated as a town.

The community recognized its 100th anniversary by holding Centennial Celebrations on 21 to 31 July 2011.

There are about 800 cabins at nearby Wakaw Lake, some of which are occupied year round.

== Demographics ==
In the 2021 Census of Population conducted by Statistics Canada, Wakaw had a population of 978 living in 421 of its 496 total private dwellings, a change of 6.1% from its 2016 population of 922. With a land area of 3.09 km^{2} (1.19 sq mi), it had a population density of 316.5/km^{2} (819.7/sq mi) in 2021.

Canada census – Wakaw community profile

	2011
Population	985 (+14.0% from 2006)
Land area	3.12 km^{2} (1.20 sq mi)
Population density	315.9/km^{2} (818/sq mi)
Median age	49.5 (M: 48.2, F: 51.1)
Private dwellings	473 (total)
Median household income

References: 2011

== Amenities ==
Businesses in Wakaw include grocery stores, a pharmacy, restaurants, insurance agencies, and six places of worship. Outside of town limits, at the conjunction of Highway 2 and Highway 41, there are two gas stations and restaurants. Wakaw also contains some more unique retail locations, including a vodka distillery and several boutiques serving the community and the nearby Wakaw Lake.

Wakaw contains three parks, including an outdoor waterpark that is operational in the summer months.

The town's school, Wakaw School, teaches students from pre-kindergarten through grade twelve.

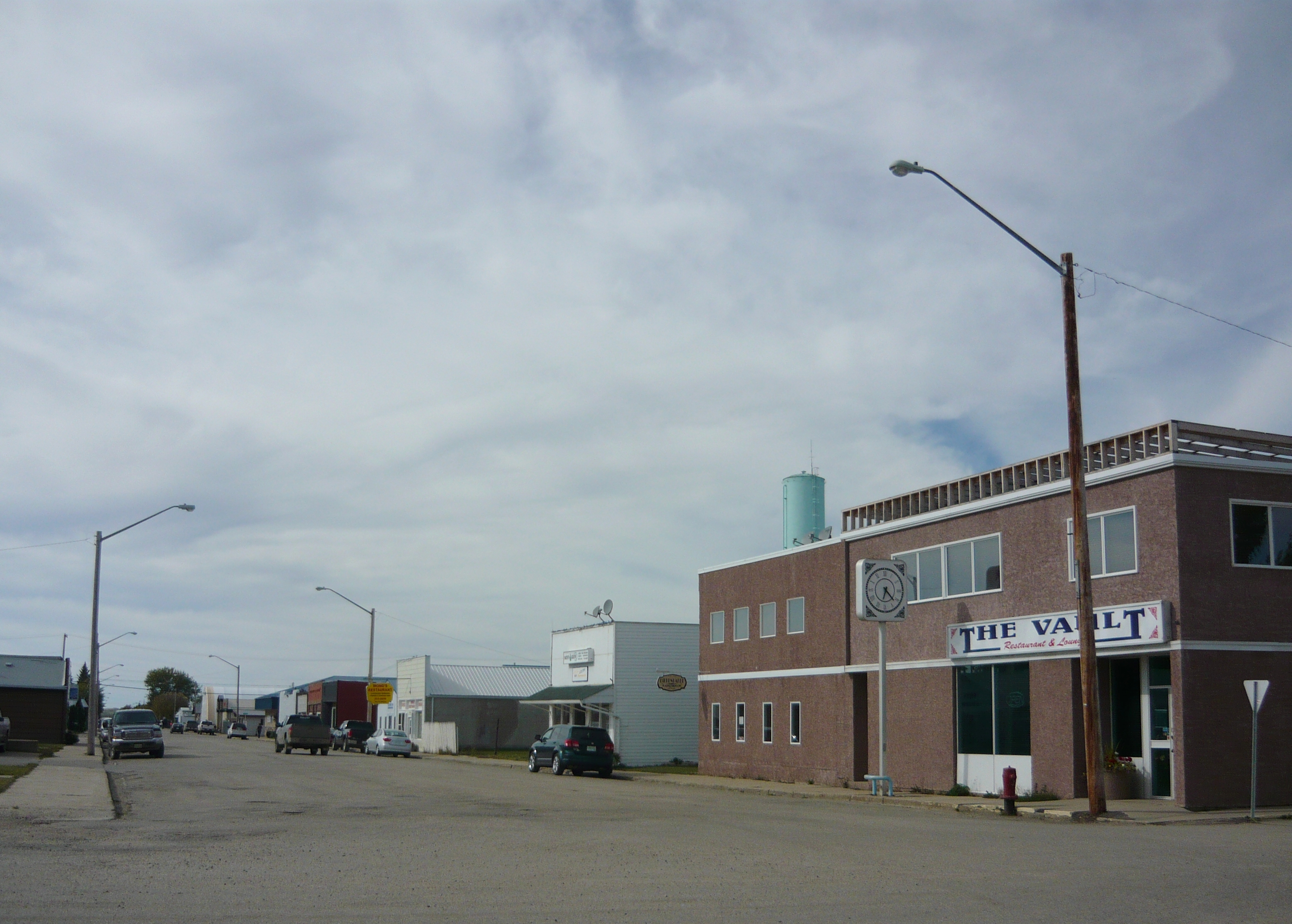
1st Street South

== Notable people ==
- Dave Balon - professional ice hockey player and coach
- Harvey Cenaiko - former Solicitor General of Alberta and policeman
- Tom Courchene - economist and professor; Officer of the Order of Canada
- John Diefenbaker - 13th Prime Minister of Canada
- James Latos - professional ice hockey player for the New York Rangers and coach
- Nancy Martin - Canadian curler
- Dave Michayluk - professional ice hockey player for the Philadelphia Flyers and Pittsburgh Penguins
- Linden Vey - professional ice hockey player for the ZSC Lions organization in the National League (NL); Olympic bronze medalist PyeongChang 2018

== See also ==
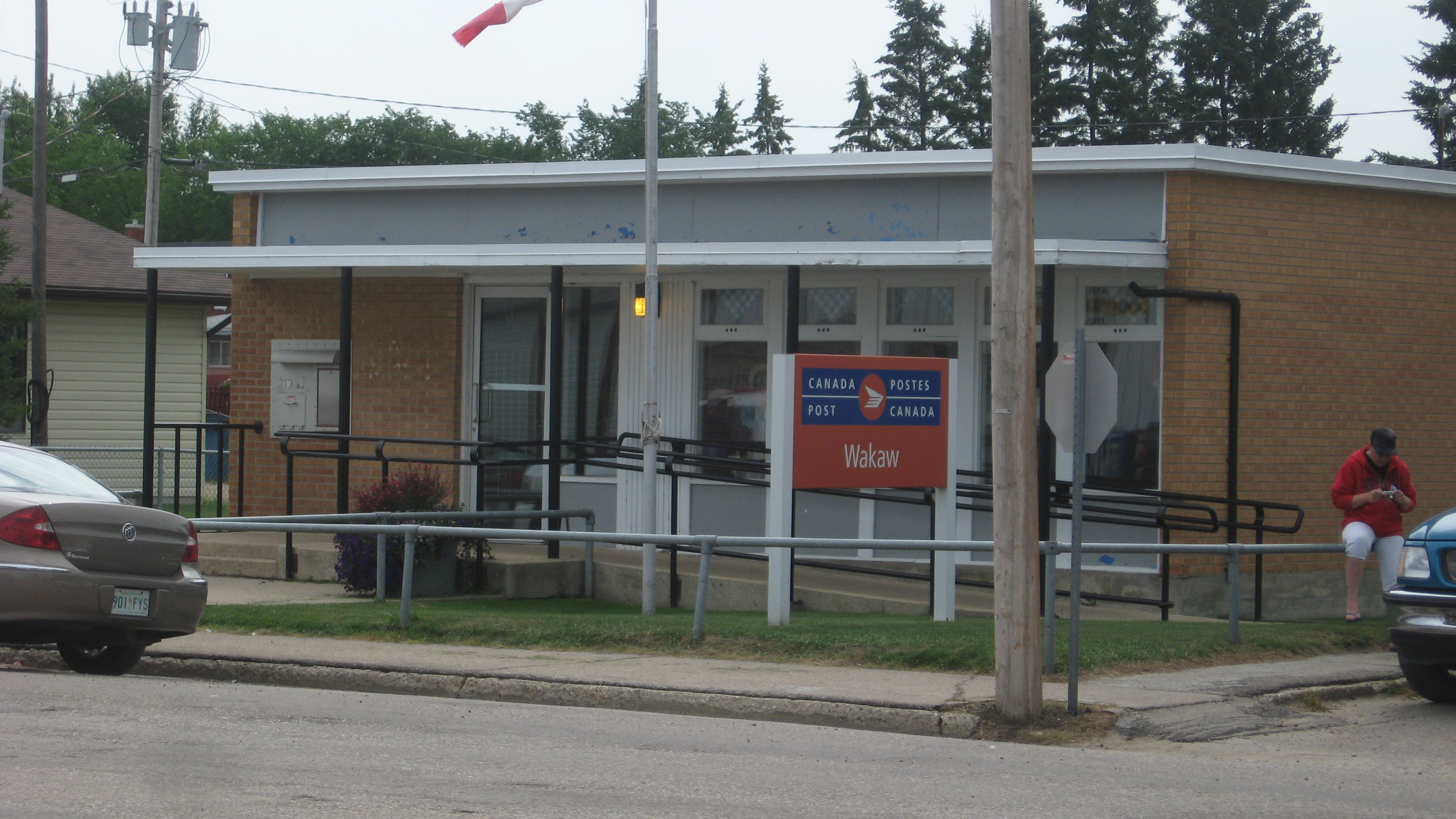
Wakaw Post Office building in 2009

- List of communities in Saskatchewan
- List of francophone communities in Saskatchewan
- List of place names in Canada of Indigenous origin
- List of towns in Saskatchewan
- Wakaw Airport
