= Odelein =

Odelein is a surname. Notable people with the surname include:

- Lee Odelein (1967–2017), Canadian ice hockey player
- Lyle Odelein (1968–2026), Canadian ice hockey player, brother of Selmar and Lee
- Selmar Odelein (born 1966), Canadian ice hockey player
