= Melfort (provincial electoral district) =

Provincial electoral district in Saskatchewan, Canada

Coordinates: 52°35′N 104°30′W

Saskatchewan electoral district

Provincial electoral district
- Legislature: Legislative Assembly of Saskatchewan
MLA
Todd Goudy
Saskatchewan
- First contested: 1912
- Last contested: 2020

Demographics
- Electors: 12,254
- Census division(s): Division No. 10, Division 14, Division No. 15
- Census subdivision(s): Annaheim, Beatty, Cumberland 100A, Englefeld, Flett's Springs No. 429, Humboldt No. 370, James Smith 100, Kinistin 91, Kinistino No. 459, Lake Lenore, Lake Lenore No. 399, Lakeside No. 338, Leroy, Leroy No. 339, Melfort, Naicam, Nipawin No. 487, Pleasantdale, Pleasantdale No. 398, Quill Lake, Spalding, Spalding No. 368, Star City, Star City No. 428, St. Brieux, St. Gregor, St. Peter No. 369, Three Lakes No. 400, Valparaiso, Watson, Willow Creek No. 458

Melfort is a provincial electoral district for the Legislative Assembly of Saskatchewan, Canada. The city of Melfort (population 5,992) is the largest centre in the constituency. Smaller communities in the district include the towns of Watson, Star City, Leroy, and Naicam; and the villages of Quill Lake, Spalding, Beatty, Englefeld, and Annaheim.

The riding has existed since the 1912 election.

== Members of the Legislative Assembly ==
Legislature	Years	Member	Party
Melfort
3rd	1912–1917	George Balfour Johnson	Liberal
4th	1917–1921	George Balfour Johnson	Liberal
5th	1921–1925	George Balfour Johnson	Liberal
6th	1925–1929	Olin Drake Hill	Liberal
7th	1929–1934	Rupert James Greaves	Progressive Conservative
8th	1934–1938	John Duncan MacFarlane	Liberal
9th	1938–1944	Oakland Woods Valleau	Co-operative Commonwealth
10th	1944–1948	Oakland Woods Valleau	Co-operative Commonwealth
11th	1948–1952	John George Egnatoff	Liberal
Melfort-Tisdale
12th	1952–1956	Clarence George Willis	Co-operative Commonwealth
13th	1956–1960	Clarence George Willis	Co-operative Commonwealth
14th	1960–1964	Clarence George Willis	Co-operative Commonwealth
15th	1964–1967	Clarence George Willis	Co-operative Commonwealth
16th	1967–1971	Clarence George Willis	New Democratic
Melfort-Kinistino
17th	1971–1975	Arthur Thibault	New Democratic
Melfort
18th	1975–1978	Norman Vickar	New Democratic
19th	1978–1982	Norman Vickar	New Democratic
20th	1982–1986	Grant Hodgins	Progressive Conservative
21st	1986–1991	Grant Hodgins	Progressive Conservative
22nd	1991–1995	Carol Carson	New Democratic
Melfort-Tisdale
23rd	1995–1997	Rod Gantefoer	Liberal
23rd	1997–1999	Rod Gantefoer	Saskatchewan
24th	1999–2003	Rod Gantefoer	Saskatchewan
Melfort
25th	2003–2007	Rod Gantefoer	Saskatchewan
26th	2007–2011	Rod Gantefoer	Saskatchewan
27th	2011–2016	Kevin Phillips	Saskatchewan
28th	2016–2017	Kevin Phillips	Saskatchewan
28th	2018–2020	Todd Goudy	Saskatchewan
29th	2020–2024	Todd Goudy	Saskatchewan
30th	2024–present	Todd Goudy	Saskatchewan

== Election results ==
=== Melfort (2003–present) ===
2024 Saskatchewan general election
Party	Candidate	Votes	%	±%
Saskatchewan	Todd Goudy	5,796	73.90	-3.68
New Democratic	Melanie Dyck	1,576	20.09	+4.27
Saskatchewan United	Dave Moore	379	4.83	–
Green	Tristan St. Germain	92	1.17	-0.27
Total valid votes		7,843	99.52	
Total rejected ballots		38	0.48	
Turnout		7,881	59.22	
Eligible voters		13,307		
Saskatchewan hold		Swing		
Source: Elections Saskatchewan

2020 Saskatchewan general election
Party	Candidate	Votes	%	±%
Saskatchewan	Todd Goudy	5,550	77.58	-1.10
New Democratic	Lorne Schroeder	1,132	15.82	-3.65
Buffalo	David Waldner	369	5.16	–
Green	Matthew Diakuw	103	1.44	-0.41
Total valid votes		7,154	99.54	
Total rejected ballots		33	0.46	–
Turnout		7,187	–	–
Eligible voters		–		
Saskatchewan hold		Swing		–
Source: Elections Saskatchewan

Saskatchewan provincial by-election, March 1, 2018
Party	Candidate	Votes	%	±%
Saskatchewan	Todd Goudy	3,270	78.68	+1.59
New Democratic	Lorne Schoreder	809	19.47	+0.04
Green	Shawn Setyo	77	1.85	+0.44
Total valid votes		4,156	99.71	
Total rejected ballots		12	0.29	-0.00
Turnout		4,168	34.22	-25.01
Eligible voters		12,181		
Saskatchewan hold		Swing		+0.78

2016 Saskatchewan general election
Party	Candidate	Votes	%
Saskatchewan	Kevin Phillips	5,579	77.09
New Democratic	Linsey Thornton	1,406	19.43
Liberal	Bruce Ber	150	2.07
Green	Tanner Wallace	102	1.41
Total valid votes		7,237	99.71
Total rejected ballots		21	0.29
Turnout		7,258	59.23
Eligible voters		12,254	
Source: Elections Saskatchewan

2011 Saskatchewan general election: Melfort electoral district
Party	Candidate	Votes	%	±%
Saskatchewan	Kevin Phillips	4,736	73.10	+7.85
NDP	Ivan Yackel	1,599	24.68	-5.41
Green	Melvyn Pylypchuk	144	2.22	–
Total valid votes		6,479	99.78	
Total rejected ballots		14	0.22	-0.04
Turnout		6,493	65.72	-5.49
Eligible voters		9,880		
Saskatchewan hold		Swing		+6.63
Source: Elections Saskatchewan

2007 Saskatchewan general election: Melfort electoral district
Party	Candidate	Votes	%	±%
Saskatchewan	Rod Gantefoer	4,751	65.25	+10.43
NDP	Dale Renneberg	2,191	30.09	-8.16
Liberal	Sarah Koskie	339	4.66	-2.27
Total valid votes		7,281	99.74	
Total rejected ballots		19	0.26	+0.07
Turnout		7,300	71.21	+4.38
Eligible voters		10,251		
Saskatchewan hold		Swing		+9.30
Source: Elections Saskatchewan

2003 Saskatchewan general election
Party	Candidate	Votes	%
Saskatchewan	Rod Gantefoer	4,060	54.82
NDP	Garnet Davis	2,833	38.25
Liberal	Bernie Yuzdepski	513	6.93
Total valid votes		7,406	99.81
Total rejected ballots		14	0.19
Turnout		7,420	66.83
Eligible voters		11,102	
Source: Elections Saskatchewan

=== Melfort-Tisdale (1995–2003) ===
1999 Saskatchewan general election: Melfort-Tisdale electoral district
Party	Candidate	Votes	%	±%
Saskatchewan	Rod Gantefoer	4,096	51.88	+36.95
NDP	Carol Carson	2,489	31.53	-6.70
Liberal	Ken Magnus	1,310	16.59	-30.25
Total valid votes		7,895	99.61	
Total rejected ballots		31	0.39	
Turnout		7,926	69.88	
Eligible voters		11,343		
Saskatchewan gain from Liberal		Swing		+33.60
Source: Elections Saskatchewan

^ Saskatchewan Party change is from Progressive Conservative

1995 Saskatchewan general election: Melfort-Tisdale
Party	Candidate	Votes	%
Liberal	Rod Gantefoer	3,882	46.84
NDP	Carol Carson	3,168	38.23
Prog. Conservative	Bill Ripley	1,237	14.93
Total valid votes		8,287	99.79
Total rejected ballots		17	0.21
Turnout			71.21
Eligible voters		11,662	
Source: Elections Saskatchewan

=== Melfort (1975–1995) ===
1991 Saskatchewan general election: Melfort electoral district
Party	Candidate	Votes	%	±%
NDP	Carol Carson	3,011	41.12	+3.55
Prog. Conservative	Ken Naber	2,516	34.36	-21.74
Liberal	Rod Gantefoer	1,795	24.52	+18.19
Total		7,322	100.00	
New Democratic gain from Progressive Conservative		Swing		-

1986 Saskatchewan general election: Melfort electoral district
Party	Candidate	Votes	%	±%
Progressive Conservative	Grant Hodgins	4,433	56.10	+0.66
NDP	Keith Davis	2,969	37.57	+0.43
Liberal	Jerry Derkatz	500	6.33	+4.77
Total		7,902	100.00	
Progressive Conservative hold		Swing		-

1982 Saskatchewan general election: Melfort electoral district
Party	Candidate	Votes	%	±%
Progressive Conservative	Grant Hodgins	4,626	55.44	+11.52
NDP	Norman Vickar	3,099	37.14	-11.85
Western Canada Concept	Brian Bedard	489	5.86	–
Liberal	Helen Hamilton	130	1.56	-5.53
Total		8,344	100.00	
Progressive Conservative gain from New Democratic		Swing		-

1978 Saskatchewan general election: Melfort electoral district
Party	Candidate	Votes	%	±%
NDP	Norman Vickar	4,181	48.99	+11.61
Progressive Conservative	Bill Warner	3,749	43.92	+7.76
Liberal	John Calderwood	605	7.09	-19.37
Total		8,535	100.00	
New Democratic hold		Swing		-

1975 Saskatchewan general election: Melfort electoral district
Party	Candidate	Votes	%	±%
NDP	Norman Vickar	3,102	37.38	-22.02
Progressive Conservative	Bill Warner	3,001	36.16	–
Liberal	Herbert Whitley	2,196	26.46	-14.14
Total		8,299	100.00	
New Democratic hold		Swing		-

=== Melfort-Kinistino (1971–1975) ===
1971 Saskatchewan general election: Melfort-Kinistino electoral district
Party	Candidate	Votes	%	±%
NDP	Arthur Thibault	6,103	59.40	–
Liberal	Herbert Whitley	4,171	40.60	–
Total		10,274	100.00	
New Democratic pickup new district.				

=== Melfort-Tisdale (1952–1971) ===
1967 Saskatchewan general election: Melfort-Tisdale electoral district
Party	Candidate	Votes	%	±%
NDP	Clarence G. Willis	4,133	50.94%	+10.68
Liberal	Donald Lamb	3,650	44.98%	+9.53
Social Credit	Orville Pederson	331	4.08%	-
Total		8,114	100.00%	

1964 Saskatchewan general election: Melfort-Tisdale electoral district
Party	Candidate	Votes	%	±%
CCF	Clarence G. Willis	3,471	40.26%	-1.37
Liberal	William E. Hurd	3,056	35.45%	+20.57
Prog. Conservative	Ken Aseltine	2,094	24.29%	+8.44
Total		8,621	100.00%	

1960 Saskatchewan general election: Melfort-Tisdale electoral district
Party	Candidate	Votes	%	±%
CCF	Clarence G. Willis	3,318	41.63%	-4.12
Social Credit	Gerry Wilson	2,203	27.64%	-10.33
Prog. Conservative	Ken Aseltine	1,264	15.85%	-
Liberal	Gaston Alfred Jean Platana	1,186	14.88%	-1.40
Total		7,971	100.00%	

1956 Saskatchewan general election: Melfort-Tisdale electoral district
Party	Candidate	Votes	%	±%
CCF	Clarence G. Willis	3,738	45.75%	-5.60
Social Credit	James S. Reynolds	3,102	37.97%	–
Liberal	Richard A. Clackson	1,330	16.28%	-20.03
Total		8,170	100.00%	

1952 Saskatchewan general election: Melfort-Tisdale electoral district
Party	Candidate	Votes	%	±%
CCF	Clarence G. Willis	4,602	51.35%	–
Liberal	John Egnatoff	3,254	36.31%	–
Prog. Conservative	Fred G. Green	1,106	12.34%	–
Total		8,962	100.00%	

=== Melfort (1912–1952) ===
1948 Saskatchewan general election: Melfort electoral district
Party	Candidate	Votes	%	±%
Liberal	John Egnatoff	4,065	50.18%	+22.42
CCF	Oakland W. Valleau	4,035	49.82%	-0.80
Total		8,100	100.00%	

1944 Saskatchewan general election: Melfort electoral district
Party	Candidate	Votes	%	±%
CCF	Oakland W. Valleau	3,396	50.62%	+14.25
Liberal	John McFarlane	1,862	27.76%	-4.20
Conservative	Stanley B. Caskey	1,450	21.62%	+2.33
Total		6,708	100.00%	

1938 Saskatchewan general election: Melfort electoral district
Party	Candidate	Votes	%	±%
CCF	Oakland W. Valleau	3,024	36.37%	–
Liberal	John McFarlane	2,657	31.96%	-23.02
Conservative	Gilbert D. Eamer	1,604	19.29%	-25.73
Social Credit	Chrysostom J. Lewis	1,029	12.38%	–
Total		8,314	100.00%	

1934 Saskatchewan general election: Melfort electoral district
Party	Candidate	Votes	%	±%
Liberal	John McFarlane	3,972	54.98%	+12.39
Conservative	Rupert Greaves	3,252	45.02%	-12.39
Total		7,224	100.00%	

1929 Saskatchewan general election: Melfort electoral district
Party	Candidate	Votes	%	±%
Conservative	Rupert Greaves	3,411	57.41%	+34.43
Liberal	Olin Drake Hill	2,531	42.59%	+2.08
Total		5,942	100.00%	

1925 Saskatchewan general election: Melfort electoral district
Party	Candidate	Votes	%	±%
Liberal	Olin Drake Hill	1,469	40.51%	-21.25
Progressive	Robert McKay	1,324	36.51%	–
Conservative	Gilbert M. Irvine	833	22.98%	-
Total		3,626	100.00%	

1921 Saskatchewan general election: Melfort electoral district
Party	Candidate	Votes	%	±%
Liberal	George Balfour Johnston	1,846	61.76%	-0.45
Independent	John Alexander McDonald	1,143	38.24%	+0.45
Total		2,989	100.00%	

1917 Saskatchewan general election: Melfort electoral district
Party	Candidate	Votes	%	±%
Liberal	George Balfour Johnston	1,661	62.21%	+6.34
Conservative	John Alexander McDonald	1,009	37.79%	-6.34
Total		2,670	100.00%	

1912 Saskatchewan general election: Melfort electoral district
Party	Candidate	Votes	%	±%
Liberal	George Balfour Johnston	818	55.87%	–
Conservative	Thomas Charles Spence	646	44.13%	–
Total		1,464	100.00%	

== See also ==
- List of Saskatchewan provincial electoral districts
- List of Saskatchewan general elections
- Canadian provincial electoral districts
