= Kinistino (Saskatchewan provincial electoral district) =

Former provincial electoral district in Saskatchewan, Canada

Coordinates: 52°55′N 105°20′W

Kinistino was a provincial electoral district for the Legislative Assembly of the province of Saskatchewan, Canada. Located in north-central Saskatchewan, it was centred on the town of Kinistino. This constituency was one of 25 created for the 1st Saskatchewan general election in 1905.

Dissolved and combined with the Melfort riding in 1971, the district was reconstituted before the 18th Saskatchewan general election in 1975. It was dissolved again in 1995 into Saskatchewan Rivers, Melfort-Tisdale, Humboldt and a small part to Prince Albert Carlton.

It is now part of the constituencies of Batoche, Melfort, and Saskatchewan Rivers.

== Members of the Legislative Assembly ==
=== 1905–1971 ===
#	MLA	Served	Party
1.	Thomas Sanderson	1905 – 1908	Liberal
2.	George Balfour Johnston	1908 – 1912	Provincial Rights
3.	Edward Devline	1912 – 1916	Liberal
4.	Charles Avery Dunning	Nov. 1916 – 1917	Liberal
5.	John Richard P. Taylor	1917 – 1925	Liberal
6.	Charles McIntosh	1925 – 1933	Liberal
7.	John Richard P. Taylor	June 1933 – 1944	Liberal
8.	William J. Boyle	1944 – 1948	CCF
9.	William Woods	1948 – 1952	Liberal
10.	Henry Begrand	1952 – 1959	CCF
11.	Arthur Thibault	June 1959 – 1971	CCF-NDP

=== 1975–1995 ===
#	MLA	Served	Party
1.	Arthur Thibault	1975 – 1978	New Democrat
2.	Don Cody	1978 – 1982	New Democrat
3.	Bernard Boutin	1982 – 1986	Progressive Conservative
4.	Joe Saxinger	1986 – 1991	Progressive Conservative
5.	Armand Roy	1991 – 1995	New Democrat

== Election results ==
1905 Saskatchewan general election: Kinistino electoral district
Party	Candidate	Votes	%	±%
Liberal	Thomas Sanderson	662	52.08%	–
Provincial Rights	Alfred Schmitz Shadd	609	47.92%	–
Total		1,271	100.00%	

1908 Saskatchewan general election: Kinistino electoral district
Party	Candidate	Votes	%	±%
Provincial Rights	George Balfour Johnston	1,000	52.97%	+5.05
Liberal	Thomas Sanderson	888	47.03%	-5.05
Total		1,888	100.00%	

1912 Saskatchewan general election: Kinistino electoral district
Party	Candidate	Votes	%	±%
Liberal	Edward Devline	914	67.60%	+20.57
Conservative	G.N. Giles	438	32.40%	-20.57
Total		1,352	100.00%	

November 13, 1916 By-Election: Kinistino electoral district
Party	Candidate	Votes	%	±%
Liberal	Charles Avery Dunning	Acclaimed	100.00%	
Total		Acclamation		

1917 Saskatchewan general election: Kinistino electoral district
Party	Candidate	Votes	%	±%
Liberal	John Richard P. Taylor	2,206	71.97%	-
Conservative	William M. Sproule	859	28.03%	-
Total		3,065	100.00%	

1921 Saskatchewan general election: Kinistino electoral district
Party	Candidate	Votes	%	±%
Liberal	John Richard P. Taylor	1,902	52.32%	-19.59
Independent	John McCloy	1,733	47.68%	–
Total		3,635	100.00%	

1925 Saskatchewan general election: Kinistino electoral district
Party	Candidate	Votes	%	±%
Liberal	Charles McIntosh	2,263	61.58%	+9.26
Progressive	John McCloy	1,412	38.42%	-9.26
Total		3,675	100.00%	

1929 Saskatchewan general election: Kinistino electoral district
Party	Candidate	Votes	%	±%
Liberal	Charles McIntosh	3,193	57.49%	-4.09
Independent	Silas W. Baker	2,361	42.51%	-
Total		5,554	100.00%	

May 22, 1933 By-Election: Kinistino electoral district
Party	Candidate	Votes	%	±%
Liberal	John Richard P. Taylor	4,186	65.93%	
Government	Charles McIntosh	2,163	34.07%	
Total		6,349	100.00%	

1934 Saskatchewan general election: Kinistino electoral district
Party	Candidate	Votes	%	±%
Liberal	John Richard P. Taylor	2,772	48.79%	-17.14
Farmer-Labour	Palmer Grambo	1,835	32.30%	–
Conservative	R.E. Forbes	1,074	18.91%	-15.16
Total		5,681	100.00%	

1938 Saskatchewan general election: Kinistino electoral district
Party	Candidate	Votes	%	±%
Liberal	John Richard P. Taylor	2,866	42.32%	-6.47
Social Credit	William H. Setka	1,864	27.53%	–
CCF	William J. Boyle	1,482	21.88%	-10.42
Conservative	Andrew Fraser	560	8.27%	-10.64
Total		6,772	100.00%	

1944 Saskatchewan general election: Kinistino electoral district
Party	Candidate	Votes	%	±%
CCF	William J. Boyle	3,055	57.97%	+36.09
Liberal	Russell M. Paul	1,544	29.30%	-13.02
Prog. Conservative	Andrew Fraser	671	12.73%	+4.46
Total		5,270	100.00%	

1948 Saskatchewan general election: Kinistino electoral district
Party	Candidate	Votes	%	±%
Liberal	William Woods	3,086	50.78%	+21.48
CCF	William J. Boyle	2,991	49.22%	-8.75
Total		6,077	100.00%	

1952 Saskatchewan general election: Kinistino electoral district
Party	Candidate	Votes	%	±%
CCF	Henry Begrand	4,186	58.67%	+9.45
Liberal	William Woods	2,949	41.33%	-9.45
Total		7,135	100.00%	

1956 Saskatchewan general election: Kinistino electoral district
Party	Candidate	Votes	%	±%
CCF	Henry Begrand	3,147	45.58%	-13.09
Social Credit	Robert B. Rowed	1,976	28.62%	-
Liberal	John Mantyka	1,782	25.80%	-15.53
Total		6,905	100.00%	

June 3, 1959 By-Election: Kinistino electoral district
Party	Candidate	Votes	%	±%
CCF	Arthur Thibault	2,990	47.89%	+2.31
Liberal	Albert M. Connor	1,656	26.53%	+0.73
Prog. Conservative	Harvey Gjesdal	1,597	25.58%	-
Total		6,243	100.00%	

1960 Saskatchewan general election: Kinistino electoral district
Party	Candidate	Votes	%	±%
CCF	Arthur Thibault	2,731	42.17%	-5.72
Liberal	Albert M. Connor	2,179	33.64%	+7.11
Prog. Conservative	Harvey Gjesdal	994	15.34%	-10.24
Social Credit	Harry P. Njaa	573	8.85%	-
Total		6,477	100.00%	

1964 Saskatchewan general election: Kinistino electoral district
Party	Candidate	Votes	%	±%
CCF	Arthur Thibault	3,334	51.62%	+9.45
Liberal	Michael A. Hnidy	3,125	48.38%	+14.74
Total		6,459	100.00%	

1967 Saskatchewan general election: Kinistino electoral district
Party	Candidate	Votes	%	±%
NDP	Arthur Thibault	3,260	54.48%	+2.86
Liberal	Lyle Rea	2,724	45.52%	-2.86
Total		5,984	100.00%	

1975 Saskatchewan general election: Kinistino electoral district
Party	Candidate	Votes	%	±%
NDP	Arthur Thibault	3,215	44.21%	-
Liberal	Ed Olchowy	2,400	33.00%	-
Progressive Conservative	Tom Smith	1,657	22.79%	-
Total		7,272	100.00%	

1978 Saskatchewan general election: Kinistino electoral district
Party	Candidate	Votes	%	±%
NDP	Donald Cody	4,042	54.55%	+10.34
Progressive Conservative	Louis A. Domotor	2,661	35.92%	+13.13
Liberal	Robert G. Michayluk	706	9.53%	-23.47
Total		7,409	100.00%	

1982 Saskatchewan general election: Kinistino electoral district
Party	Candidate	Votes	%	±%
Progressive Conservative	Bernard Boutin	4,266	51.57%	+15.65
NDP	Donald Cody	3,759	45.44%	-9.11
Liberal	Ed Olchowy	247	2.99%	-6.54
Total		8,272	100.00%	

1986 Saskatchewan general election: Kinistino electoral district
Party	Candidate	Votes	%	±%
Progressive Conservative	Joe Saxinger	3,900	49.11%	-2.46
NDP	Don Cody	3,748	47.20%	+1.76
Liberal	Ray L. Manegre	293	3.69%	+0.70
Total		7,941	100.00%	

1991 Saskatchewan general election: Kinistino electoral district
Party	Candidate	Votes	%	±%
NDP	Armand Roy	4,298	50.32%	+3.12
Progressive Conservative	Joe Saxinger	2,918	34.16%	-14.95
Liberal	Frank Orosz	1,326	15.52%	+11.83
Total		8,542	100.00%	

== See also ==
- List of Saskatchewan provincial electoral districts
- List of Saskatchewan general elections
- Canadian provincial electoral districts
