= William James Boyle =

Canadian politician

MLA for Kinistino
- In office 1944–1948
- Preceded by: John Richard P. Taylor
- Succeeded by: Billy Woods

Personal details
- Born: October 22, 1887 Cobourg, Ontario
- Died: 1971 (aged 83–84)
- Party: Saskatchewan Co-operative Commonwealth Federation

William James Boyle (October 22, 1887 – 1971) was a political figure in Saskatchewan. He represented Kinistino from 1944 to 1948 in the Legislative Assembly of Saskatchewan as a Co-operative Commonwealth Federation (CCF) member.

He was born in Cobourg, Ontario, the son of Thomas Boyle and Isabel Carstairs. In 1914, Boyle married Mary Teresa Fanning. He served as reeve for the rural municipality of Invergordon. Boyle lived in Kinistino, Saskatchewan. He ran unsuccessfully for a seat in the provincial assembly in 1938 before being elected in 1944. Boyle was defeated by William Carlton Woods when he ran for reelection in 1948.
