= Thomas Sanderson (Saskatchewan politician) =

Canadian politician

Thomas Sanderson (December 28, 1849 – 1922) was a Scottish-born farmer and political figure in Saskatchewan. He represented Kinistino in the Legislative Assembly of Saskatchewan from 1905 to 1908 as a Liberal.

He was born in Galashiels and was educated there and in St. Catharines, Ontario. In 1889, Sanderson married Jean Forsyth. He served as president of the Board of Trade for Kinistino. Sanderson was defeated by George Balfour Johnston when he ran for reelection to the provincial assembly in 1908.

Thomas Sanderson first came out West as far as what in now Winnipeg in 1875. He came again with a friend in 1878 and travelled as far as Prince Albert. Together they spotted land South East of PA, at the Carrot River. and decided this is where they wanted to settle. Sanderson went back to Ontario and over 10 families came West in 1879 travelling by horseback, cart and by foot from Winnipeg 500 miles north west to near what is now Kinistino. In 1885, he was captured by Louis Riel' men and held prisoner at Batache, until he was sent by Riel to advise the NWMP to recover their dead at Duck Lake. He returned 10 bodies and 1 wounded to Prince Albert. He testified at Riel's trial at Regina.
