= Valleau =

Valleau may refer to:

== People ==
- Delmar Valleau (1917–2000), Canadian politician
- Oakland Woods Valleau (1892–1976), Canadian politician
- Sacha Valleau (born 1996), French rugby player

== Other uses ==
- Anse-à-Valleau Wind Farm, farm in Quebec
- L'Anse-à-Valleau, Quebec, town in Quebec
- Valleau Tavern, town in New York
