= Arthur Thibault =

Canadian politician

MLA for Kinistino
- In office 1959–1971 and 1975–1978
- Preceded by: Henry Begrand
- Succeeded by: Don Cody

MLA for Melfort-Kinistino
- In office 1971–1975
- Preceded by: Clarence George Willis (as MLA for Melfort-Tisdale)
- Succeeded by: Norman Vickar (as MLA for Melfort)

Personal details
- Born: Arthur Joseph Thibault; February 21, 1914 Bonne Madone, Saskatchewan
- Died: 22 February 1983 (aged 69)
- Party: Saskatchewan New Democratic Party
- Profession: Farmer

Arthur Joseph Thibault (February 21, 1914 – February 22, 1983) was a farmer and political figure in Saskatchewan. He represented Kinistino from 1959 to 1971 Co-operative Commonwealth Federation (CCF) member and from 1975 to 1978 as a New Democratic Party (NDP) member and Melfort-Kinistino from 1971 to 1975 as an NDP member in the Legislative Assembly of Saskatchewan.

He was born in Bonne Madone, Saskatchewan, the son of Eugene Thibault and Emma McGary, and went on to farm in the Tarnopol district. He served as reeve of Invergordon, as a member of the local school board and as a member of the Saskatchewan Farmers' Union. In 1941, he married Doris Lepine. Thibault was first elected to the Saskatchewan assembly in a 1959 by-election held following the death of Henry Begrand. From 1978 to 1981, he worked at the St. Louis Alcoholism Rehabilitation Centre in Prince Albert.

== Electoral history ==
June 3, 1959 By-Election: Kinistino electoral district
Party	Candidate	Votes	%	±%
CCF	Arthur Thibault	2,990	47.89%	+2.31
Liberal	Albert M. Connor	1,656	26.53%	+0.73
Prog. Conservative	Harvey Gjesdal	1,597	25.58%	-
Total		6,243	100.00%	

1960 Saskatchewan general election: Kinistino electoral district
Party	Candidate	Votes	%	±%
CCF	Arthur Thibault	2,731	42.17%	-5.72
Liberal	Albert M. Connor	2,179	33.64%	+7.11
Prog. Conservative	Harvey Gjesdal	994	15.34%	-10.24
Social Credit	Harry P. Njaa	573	8.85%	-
Total		6,477	100.00%	

1964 Saskatchewan general election: Kinistino electoral district
Party	Candidate	Votes	%	±%
CCF	Arthur Thibault	3,334	51.62%	+9.45
Liberal	Michael A. Hnidy	3,125	48.38%	+14.74
Total		6,459	100.00%	

1967 Saskatchewan general election: Kinistino electoral district
Party	Candidate	Votes	%	±%
NDP	Arthur Thibault	3,260	54.48%	+2.86
Liberal	Lyle Rea	2,724	45.52%	-2.86
Total		5,984	100.00%	

1971 Saskatchewan general election: Melfort-Kinistino electoral district
Party	Candidate	Votes	%	±%
NDP	Arthur Thibault	6,103	59.40	–
Liberal	Herbert Whitley	4,171	40.60	–
Total		10,274	100.00	

1975 Saskatchewan general election: Kinistino electoral district
Party	Candidate	Votes	%	±%
NDP	Arthur Thibault	3,215	44.21%	-
Liberal	Ed Olchowy	2,400	33.00%	-
Progressive Conservative	Tom Smith	1,657	22.79%	-
Total		7,272	100.00%	
