= William Carlton Woods =

Canadian politician

Billy Woods

MLA for Kinistino
- In office 1948–1952
- Preceded by: William James Boyle
- Succeeded by: Henry Begrand

Personal details
- Born: William Carlton Woods; February 24, 1891 Tamworth, Ontario
- Died: December 11, 1965 (aged 74)
- Party: Liberal Party of Saskatchewan

William Carlton Woods (February 24, 1891 – December 11, 1965) was a farmer and political figure in Saskatchewan. He represented Kinistino from 1948 to 1952 in the Legislative Assembly of Saskatchewan as a Liberal.

He was born in Tamworth, Ontario, the son of Stuart B. Woods and Mary F. Cleworth, and was educated in Napanee, Oakville and Elm Creek, Manitoba. During World War I, he served in the Canadian Signal Corps and as a pilot in the Royal Air Force. Woods returned from the war suffering from diabetes and, a few years later, was being treated with insulin after taking part in some experiments with the use of the drug in Toronto in 1922. He served on the council for the rural municipality of Flett's Springs and was reeve for 15 years. Woods served as president of the Saskatchewan Association of Rural Municipalities, as a director of the Saskatchewan Anti-Tuberculosis Board and as a member of the senate for the University of Saskatchewan. In 1923, he married Margaret H. Livingston. He lived in the Pathlow and then Kinistino districts. Woods was defeated by Henry Begrand when he ran for reelection to the provincial assembly in 1952.
