= Cudworth, Saskatchewan =

Town in Saskatchewan, Canada

Cudworth
- Town
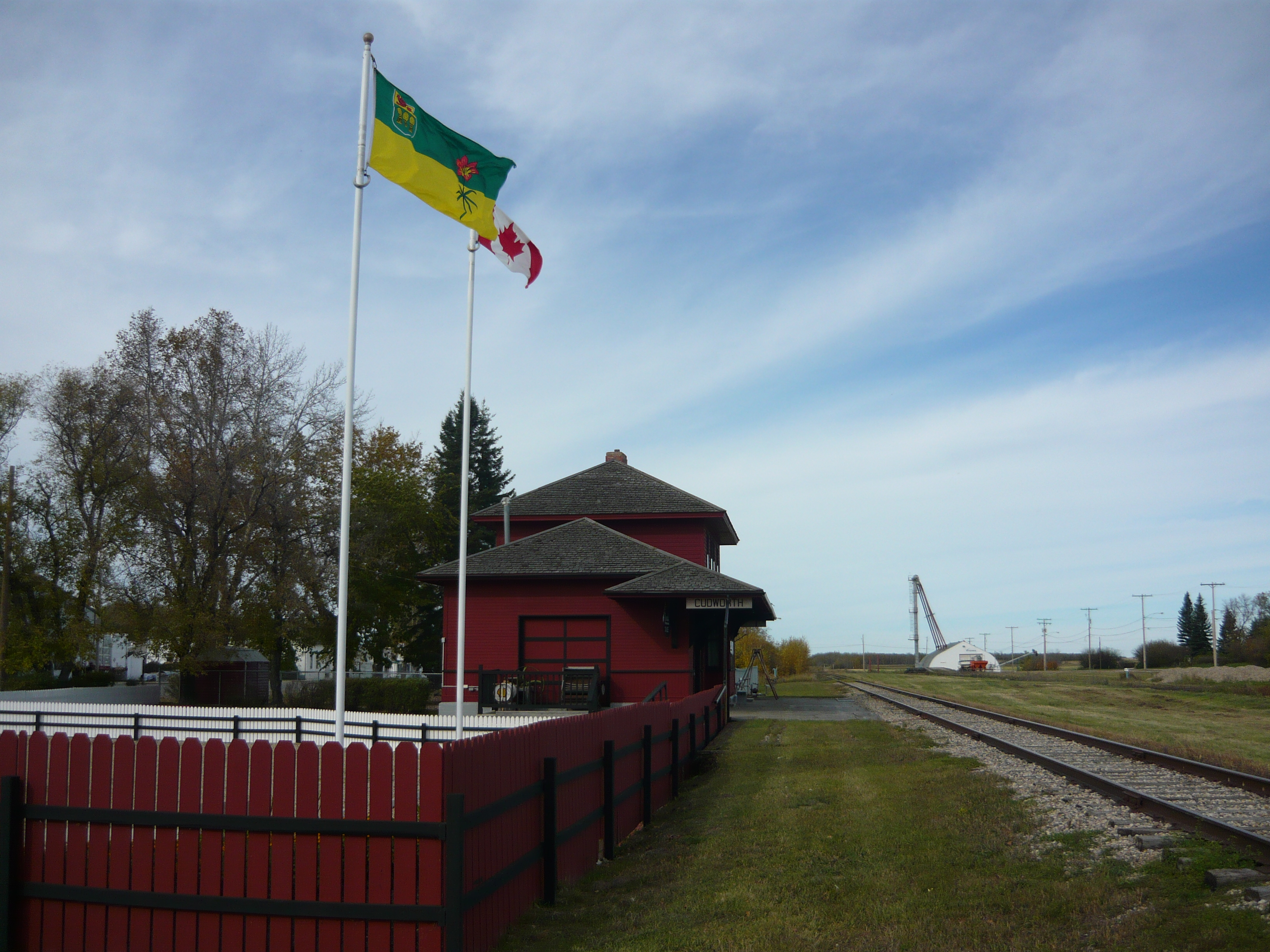
- Cudworth Heritage Museum; Former CN station
- Nickname: The Hub of the Cities
- Location of Cudworth in Saskatchewan Cudworth (Canada)
- Coordinates: 52°29′N 105°43′W
- Country: Canada
- Province: Saskatchewan
- R.M.: Hoodoo No. 401
- Census Division: Division 15
- Settled: early 1900s
- Incorporated (village): 1911
- Incorporated (town): 1961

Government
  - Mayor: Scott Friesen
  - Governing body: Cudworth town council
  - MP Saskatoon—University: Brad Trost
  - MLA Batoche: Delbert Kirsch

Area
  - Total: 2.21 km^{2} (0.85 sq mi)

Population (2011)
  - Total: 770
  - Density: 348.7/km^{2} (903/sq mi)
- Time zone: UTC-6 (CST)
- Postal code: S0K 1B0
- Area code: 306
- Highways: Highway 2
- Website: Official website

Cudworth (English: /ˈkʊdwɜːrθ/) is a town in Saskatchewan, Canada. Cudworth is located approximately 85 km north-east of Saskatoon, Saskatchewan in the Minnichinas Hills. Cudworth is in hilly partially forested country east of the South Saskatchewan River. The area is part of the aspen parkland biome.

Cudworth had a population of 770 people in 2011. It has a public K-12 school, 60 local businesses and 3 churches serving the rural area surrounding it. It is surrounded by a large agricultural community.

The first pioneers settled the area west of modern-day Cudworth in the late 19th century. Established in 1911, the village was named after English philosopher Ralph Cudworth. Present day Cudworth continues to consist mainly of families with Ukrainian and German origins.

== History ==
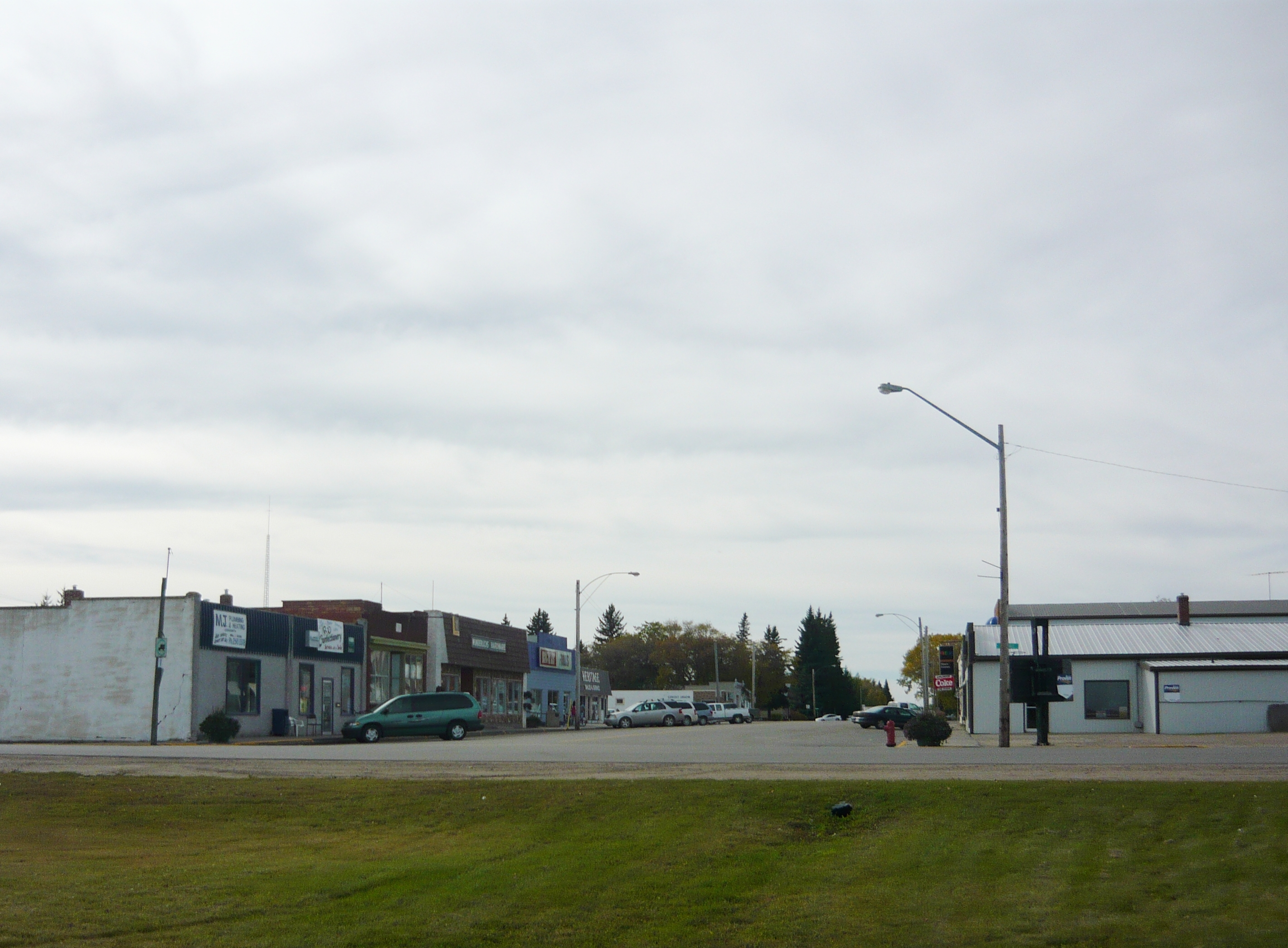
Main Street

The town was originally peopled primarily by settlers of Eastern European origin including Germany, Hungary, Poland and Ukraine.

In September 2008, Cudworth's grain elevator went up in flames. Cudworth was one of three Saskatchewan towns that still had an original Saskatchewan Wheat Pool elevator and a Canadian National Railway (CN) train station.

=== Historic sites ===
Located two miles west of Cudworth is the historic Our Lady of Sorrows Shrine. The site consists of an altar, chapel, statue and Stations of the Cross on a hill west of Highway 2. The shrine was established after three children saw a beautiful sad lady dragging chains and carrying a golden cross – when they approached her, she vanished. There is an annual pilgrimage on the tenth Sunday after Easter. It is an official pilgrimage of the Saskatoon Ukrainian Catholic Eparchy.

The Cudworth Heritage Museum (former CN Station) (c. 1925) is a Municipal Heritage Property on the Canadian Register of Historic Places.

== Demographics ==
In the 2021 Census of Population conducted by Statistics Canada, Cudworth had a population of 772 living in 331 of its 364 total private dwellings, a change of −5.2% from its 2016 population of 814. With a land area of 2.12 km^{2} (0.82 sq mi), it had a population density of 364.2/km^{2} (943.1/sq mi) in 2021.

Canada census – Cudworth community profile

	2021	2011
Population	772 (-5.2% from 2016)	770 (4.3% from 2006)
Land area	2.12 km^{2} (0.82 sq mi)	2.21 km^{2} (0.85 sq mi)
Population density	364.8/km^{2} (945/sq mi)	348.7/km^{2} (903/sq mi)
Median age	48.4 (M: 45.6, F: 50.8)	52.2 (M: 51.4, F: 53.5)
Private dwellings	364 (total) 331 (occupied)	357 (total)
Median household income	$66,500

References: 2021 2011

== Transportation ==
The municipality operates the Cudworth Municipal Airport.

== Notable people ==
- Bernard J. Leger Boutin
- Louis Domotor
- Joan Duncan
- Gerry Ehman
- Robert Kasun
- Delbert Kirsch
- Ed Komarnicki
- Orland Kurtenbach
- Cianna Murray
- Josef Saxinger
- John Shmyr
- Paul Shmyr
