= Bernard Boutin =

Bernard Boutin may refer to:

- Bernard J. Leger Boutin (1953–1986), farmer and political figure in Saskatchewan
- Bernard L. Boutin (1923–2011), American politician
