= Batoche (electoral district) =

Provincial electoral district in Saskatchewan, Canada

Coordinates: 52°45′N 105°30′W

Saskatchewan electoral district

Provincial electoral district
- Legislature: Legislative Assembly of Saskatchewan
MLA
Darlene Rowden
Saskatchewan
- District created: 2002
- First contested: 2003
- Last contested: 2024

Demographics
- Population (2001): 17,392
- Electors: 10,189
- Census division(s): 14, 15

Batoche is a provincial electoral district for the Legislative Assembly of Saskatchewan, Canada. It is located in north central Saskatchewan and has an economy based primarily on mixed agriculture and farm implement manufacturing. Bourgault Industries in St. Brieux manufactures harrows, cultivators, ploughs. The Batoche area is where Louis Riel led his Metis people in an armed uprising against the Canadian government in the North-West Rebellion of 1885. The Batoche National Historic Site and the location of the Battle of Batoche are in this constituency.

The largest communities are Birch Hills, Wakaw and Cudworth with populations of 935, 884, and 766, respectively. Smaller centres in the riding include the villages of St. Brieux, St. Louis, Lake Lenore, Duck Lake, Weldon, and Middle Lake; and the town of Kinistino.

== History ==
=== Constituency ===
A riding named Batoche was one of the original 25 constituencies created for the 1st Saskatchewan general election in 1905. It was redistributed and renamed Duck Lake for the 1908 election and abolished altogether before the 1912 general election.

Between 1912 and 1995, the riding of Kinistino covered much of the same territory previously and subsequently included in Batoche. The remaining territory was distributed between several different constituencies over the years, including Humboldt, Rosthern and Redberry.

The present Batoche riding was created by The Representation Act, 2002 (Saskatchewan) and was first contested in the 2003 general election. It was formed primarily from parts of Humboldt, Melfort-Tisdale and Saskatchewan Rivers, along with smaller areas of Prince Albert Carlton, Rosthern and Shellbrook-Spiritwood.

The riding's boundaries have changed little since 2003. Minor changes to the district's boundaries were made before the 2016 general election and similar adjustments will take effect for the next general election.

== Member of the Legislative Assembly ==
Legislature	Years	Member	Party
Riding created from Humboldt, Melfort-Tisdale and Saskatchewan Rivers
25th	2003–2007	Delbert Kirsch	Saskatchewan
26th	2007–2011	Delbert Kirsch	Saskatchewan
27th	2011–2016	Delbert Kirsch	Saskatchewan
28th	2016–2020	Delbert Kirsch	Saskatchewan
29th	2020–2024	Delbert Kirsch	Saskatchewan
30th	2024–present	Darlene Rowden	Saskatchewan

== Election results ==
2024 Saskatchewan general election
Party	Candidate	Votes	%	±%
Saskatchewan	Darlene Rowden	4,415	61.20	-4.08
New Democratic	Trina Miller	2,210	30.63	+3.49
Saskatchewan United	Erin Nicole Spencer	450	6.24	–
Green	Hamish Graham	139	1.93	-0.41
Total valid votes		7,213		
Total rejected ballots				
Turnout				
Eligible voters		–		
Saskatchewan hold		Swing		–
Source: Elections Saskatchewan

=== 2020 ===
2020 provincial election redistributed results
Party	%
Saskatchewan	66.1
New Democratic	26.8
Green	2.4
Buffalo	0.4

2020 Saskatchewan general election
Party	Candidate	Votes	%	±%
Saskatchewan	Delbert Kirsch	4,357	65.28	+0.53
New Democratic	Lon Borgerson	1,811	27.14	-3.47
Progressive Conservative	Carrie Harris	350	5.24	–
Green	Hamish Graham	156	2.34	+0.85
Total valid votes		6,674	99.43	
Total rejected ballots		38	0.57	–
Turnout		6,712	–	–
Eligible voters		–		
Saskatchewan hold		Swing		–
Source: Elections Saskatchewan

=== 2016 ===
2016 Saskatchewan general election
Party	Candidate	Votes	%	±%
Saskatchewan	Delbert Kirsch	4,471	64.75	-2.11
New Democratic	Clay DeBray	2,114	30.61	+0.33
Liberal	Graham Tweten	216	3.12	–
Green	B. Garneau I.	103	1.49	-1.40
Total valid votes		6,904	100.0	
Eligible voters		–		
Saskatchewan hold		Swing		-
Source: Elections Saskatchewan

=== 2011 ===
2011 Saskatchewan general election
Party	Candidate	Votes	%	±%
Saskatchewan	Delbert Kirsch	4,650	66.86	+7.09
New Democratic	Janice Benier	2,106	30.28	–3.86
Green	Amber Jones	199	2.86	–
Total valid votes		6,955	100.0	
Saskatchewan hold		Swing		+5.48

=== 2007 ===
2007 Saskatchewan general election
Party	Candidate	Votes	%	±%
Saskatchewan	Delbert Kirsch	4,523	59.77	+15.87
New Democratic	Don Hovdebo	2,583	34.14	–2.16
Liberal	Bernie Yuzdepski	461	6.09	–10.91
Total valid votes		7,567	100.0	
Saskatchewan hold		Swing		+9.02

=== 2003 ===
2003 Saskatchewan general election
Party	Candidate	Votes	%
Saskatchewan	Delbert Kirsch	3,349	43.90
New Democratic	Ava Bear	2,769	36.30
Liberal	Bill Yeaman	1,297	17.00
Western Independence	Florent Rabut	138	1.81
New Green	Gordon Robert Dumont	76	1.00
Total valid votes		7,629	100.0
Saskatchewan pickup new district.			

== See also ==
- List of Saskatchewan provincial electoral districts
- List of Saskatchewan general elections
- Canadian provincial electoral districts
