= Kevin Phillips (politician) =

Canadian politician

Member of the Saskatchewan Legislative Assembly for Melfort
- In office November 7, 2011 – November 13, 2017
- Preceded by: Rod Gantefoer
- Succeeded by: Todd Goudy

Personal details
- Born: May 29, 1954 Kinistino, Saskatchewan, Canada
- Died: November 13, 2017 (aged 63) Regina, Saskatchewan, Canada
- Party: Saskatchewan Party

Kevin Keith Phillips (May 29, 1954 – November 13, 2017) was a Canadian politician who was elected to the Legislative Assembly of Saskatchewan in the 2011 election. He represented the electoral district of Melfort as a member of the Saskatchewan Party caucus.

== Before politics ==
Prior to his election to the legislature, Phillips was the mayor of Melfort (2006–2011) where he had lived for more than 40 years. Phillips was in the advertising business prior to politics and was a partner in the Melfort Journal.

== Death ==
Phillips died suddenly while still in office on November 13, 2017, at the age of 63.
