= Carol Carson =

Canadian politician

MLA for Melfort
- In office 1991–1995
- Preceded by: Grant Hodgins
- Succeeded by: Rod Gantefoer

Personal details
- Born: September 5, 1945 (age 80) Nipawin, Saskatchewan
- Party: Saskatchewan New Democratic Party

Carol Carson (born September 5, 1945) is a former Canadian politician who served in the Legislative Assembly of Saskatchewan from 1991 to 1995, as a NDP member for the constituency of Melfort.
