= Norman Vickar =

Canadian politician

MLA for Melfort
- In office 1975–1982

Personal details
- Born: February 21, 1917 Brooksby, Saskatchewan
- Died: October 17, 2015 (aged 98)
- Party: Saskatchewan New Democratic Party

Norman Vickar (February 21, 1917 – October 17, 2015) was a political figure in Saskatchewan, Canada. He represented Melfort from 1975 to 1982 in the Legislative Assembly of Saskatchewan as a New Democratic Party (NDP) member. He was the second Jewish member elected to the Saskatchewan assembly.

He was born in Brooksby, Saskatchewan, the son of Samuel Vickar and Gertrude Gelmon. In 1947, Vickar married Florence Ivy. He was mayor of Melfort from 1971 to 1975. Vickar served in the Saskatchewan cabinet as Minister of Industry and Commerce. He was defeated by Grant Hodgins when he ran for reelection to the provincial assembly in 1982. Vickar subsequently moved to Winnipeg, Manitoba.

Vickar Place and the Norman Vickar Building in Melfort were named in his honour. Vickar died on October 17, 2015, at the age of 98.
