= Armand Roy =

Canadian politician

MLA for Kinistino
- In office 1991–1995
- Preceded by: Josef Saxinger
- Succeeded by: Riding dissolved

Personal details
- Born: January 16, 1958 (age 68) Wakaw Lake, Saskatchewan
- Party: Saskatchewan New Democratic Party

Armand A. Roy (born January 16, 1958) was a Canadian politician. He served in the Legislative Assembly of Saskatchewan from 1991 to 1995, as a NDP member for the constituency of Kinistino.

== Electoral history ==
1991 Saskatchewan general election: Kinistino electoral district
Party	Candidate	Votes	%	±%
NDP	Armand Roy	4,298	50.32%	+3.12
Progressive Conservative	Joe Saxinger	2,918	34.16%	-14.95
Liberal	Frank Orosz	1,326	15.52%	+11.83
Total		8,542	100.00%	
