= Henry Begrand =

Canadian politician

MLA for Kinistino
- In office 1952–1959
- Preceded by: Billy Woods
- Succeeded by: Arthur Thibault

Personal details
- Born: Jean-Henri Begrand; August 21, 1895 Halanzy, Belgium
- Died: 8 March 1959 (aged 63)
- Party: Saskatchewan Co-operative Commonwealth Federation

Jean-Henri "Henry" Begrand (August 21, 1895 – March 8, 1959) was a Belgian-born garage owner and political figure in Saskatchewan. He represented Kinistino from 1952 to 1959 in the Legislative Assembly of Saskatchewan as a Co-operative Commonwealth Federation (CCF) member. He was the first MLA to make a speech in French at the Legislative Assembly of Saskatchewan.

He was born in Halanzy, the son of François Victor-Joseph Begrand and Marie Jungers, and came to St. Louis, Saskatchewan with his family when he was just six months old. The family received Canadian citizenship in 1900 and acquired a homestead in 1908. Begrand served in the Canadian Army during World War I and received training as a mechanic. After returning home, he worked as a mechanic at a garage in Watrous before opening his own garage in Hoey. In 1920, he married Phyllis Papen. Begrand was a dealer for British American Oil and sold agricultural equipment for International Harvester. He served as reeve for the rural municipality of St. Louis from 1937 to 1952 and was also chair of the separate school board. He was an unsuccessful candidate for the Rosthern seat in the provincial assembly in the 1944 CCF sweep election. Begrand died in office of a heart attack in the Wakaw hospital at the age of 63.

== Electoral history ==
1952 Saskatchewan general election: Kinistino electoral district
Party	Candidate	Votes	%	±%
CCF	Henry Begrand	4,186	58.67%	+9.45
Liberal	William Woods	2,949	41.33%	-9.45
Total		7,135	100.00%	

1956 Saskatchewan general election: Kinistino electoral district
Party	Candidate	Votes	%	±%
CCF	Henry Begrand	3,147	45.58%	-13.09
Social Credit	Robert B. Rowed	1,976	28.62%	-
Liberal	John Mantyka	1,782	25.80%	-15.53
Total		6,905	100.00%	
