= John Duncan MacFarlane =

Scottish-Canadian farmer and political figure

John Duncan MacFarlane (July 27, 1892 – December 8, 1982) was a Scottish-born farmer and political figure in Saskatchewan. He represented Melfort from 1934 to 1938 as a Liberal.

He was born in Gargunnock and was educated in Scotland. He later worked for a law office in Stirling. In 1910, MacFarlane came to Canada, where he worked on farms and eventually earned his engineer's certificate. He graduated from the University of Saskatchewan in agriculture. MacFarlane served with the Royal Canadian Engineers and then with the Royal Flying Corps during World War I. After the war, he worked for the Soldier Settlement Board for three years. MacFarlane then settled on a farm near Carlea, Saskatchewan, where he raised Clydesdale horses, Shorthorn cattle, Yorkshire pigs, Shropshire sheep and Barred Rock chickens. He also served on the Alysham School Board. In 1920, he married Jean Gray.

MacFarlane was defeated by Oakland Woods Valleau when he ran for reelection in 1938.

He was a director for the United Grain Growers from 1947 to 1968 and was president of the Saskatchewan Registered Seed Growers plant at Moose Jaw. From 1930 to 1933, he was president of the Saskatchewan Agricultural Societies Association.

MacFarlane was named to the Saskatchewan Agricultural Hall of Fame in 1979.
