= Lee Odelein =

Canadian ice hockey player (1967–2017)

- Born: April 4, 1967 Quill Lake, Saskatchewan, Canada
- Died: February 1, 2017 (aged 49) Utila, Honduras
- Height: 6 ft 0 in (183 cm)
- Weight: 190 lb (86 kg; 13 st 8 lb)
- Position: Defence
- Shot: Left
- Played for: Bracknell Bees; Bristol Bulldogs; Flint Bulldogs; Johnstown Chiefs
- NHL draft: undrafted
- Playing career: 1989–1993

Lee Odelein (March 4, 1967 – c. February 1, 2017) was a Canadian professional ice hockey defenseman.

== Career ==
Odelein started his career with the Johnstown Chiefs of the East Coast Hockey League, playing 33 games between 1989 and 1991. He later joined the Flint Bulldogs of the Colonial Hockey League in 1991. Odelein later joined the Bracknell Bees of the British Hockey League.

=== Stick-swinging incident ===
As a member of the Bees, Odelein was involved in an incident that resulted in a broken jaw and a concussion by Murrayfield Racers defenseman Roger Hunt after Odelein hit Racers' forward Kyle McDonough over the head with a stick. Both Odelein and McDonough ended up going to the hospital in the same ambulance. As a result of the incident, Hunt was suspended from the British Hockey League for over three years, eventually returning to the league midway through the 1995-96 season with the Murrayfield Royals. Hunt was also ordered to pay Odelein £750 compensation as a result of the incident in 1996, almost four years after the original incident took place.

Odelein joined the Bristol Bulldogs of the English League Division One, assuming the role as player-coach. Odelein set career marks with 59 goals and 123 points and also led the team with 64 assists. Odelein retired after the 1992-93 season.

Odelein moved into coaching full-time after returning to Canada. He served as head coach of the Yorkton Terriers in the Saskatchewan Junior Hockey League from 1993 to 1998.

== Personal ==
Odelein was the brother of Lyle Odelein and Selmar Odelein, who both played in the National Hockey League. He died on February 1, 2017.

== Records ==
=== Bristol Bulldogs ===
- Assists: 64
- Goals by a defenseman: 59
- Points by a defenseman: 123
