= Charles McIntosh =

Canadian politician

Charles McIntosh (April 4, 1892 – 1970) was a Scottish-born farmer and political figure in Saskatchewan. He represented Kinistino in the Legislative Assembly of Saskatchewan from 1925 to 1933 as a Liberal.

He was born near Edinburgh, the son of John McIntosh and Elizabeth Pratt, came to Canada with his family in 1904, and was educated in Portage la Prairie, Manitoba. McIntosh married Genevieve H. Laidlaw in 1919. He served overseas with the Canadian Expeditionary Force during World War I. In 1932, McIntosh decided to support the coalition government of James Thomas Milton Anderson. Anderson named McIntosh to his cabinet as Minister of Natural Resources on April 29, 1933. However, when McIntosh ran for reelection to the assembly as a government supporter on May 22 that same year, he was defeated by Liberal John Richard Parish Taylor.
