= Darlene Rowden =

Canadian politician

The Honourable Darlene Rowden ECS

Member of the Saskatchewan Legislative Assembly for Batoche
- Incumbent
- Assumed office October 28, 2024
- Preceded by: Delbert Kirsch

Personal details
- Party: Saskatchewan Party

Darlene Rowden is a Canadian politician who was elected to the Legislative Assembly of Saskatchewan in the 2024 general election, representing Batoche as a member of the Saskatchewan Party.

Prior to her election, she was a school trustee and board chair with the Saskatchewan Rivers School Division. She lives near MacDowall.

== Political career ==
On December 11, 2025, Rowden replaced Travis Keisig as Saskatchewan’s Minister of Environment.
