= Josef Saxinger =

Canadian politician

Joe Saxinger

MLA for Kinistino
- In office 1986–1991
- Preceded by: Ben Boutin
- Succeeded by: Armand Roy

Personal details
- Born: Josef Saxinger; February 2, 1930 Niederbrünst, Germany
- Died: 3 July 2008 (aged 78)
- Party: Progressive Conservative Party of Saskatchewan

Josef "Joe" Saxinger (February 2, 1930 – July 3, 2008) was a German-born farmer, business owner and political figure in Saskatchewan. He represented Kinistino from 1986 to 1991 in the Legislative Assembly of Saskatchewan as a Progressive Conservative.

He was born in Niederbrünst and was educated in Haag and Passau. Saxinger trained as a tool and die maker. He came to Canada in 1954 and settled in the Cudworth district. Saxinger farmed, operated a car dealership, Saxinger Motors, and then operated Saxinger Farm Parts and Implements. He was later a partner in the Sagehill Buffalo Ranch. He was married twice: first to Eleonore Lobl in 1956 and then to Delphine Nielsen in 2006. Saxinger served as fire chief for Cudworth.

He was defeated by Armand Roy when he ran for reelection to the Saskatchewan assembly in 1991.

== Electoral history ==
1986 Saskatchewan general election: Kinistino electoral district
Party	Candidate	Votes	%	±%
Progressive Conservative	Joe Saxinger	3,900	49.11%	-2.46
NDP	Don Cody	3,748	47.20%	+1.76
Liberal	Ray L. Manegre	293	3.69%	+0.70
Total		7,941	100.00%	

1991 Saskatchewan general election: Kinistino electoral district
Party	Candidate	Votes	%	±%
NDP	Armand Roy	4,298	50.32%	+3.12
Progressive Conservative	Joe Saxinger	2,918	34.16%	-14.95
Liberal	Frank Orosz	1,326	15.52%	+11.83
Total		8,542	100.00%	
