= Oakland Woods Valleau =

Canadian politician

Oakland Woods "Oak" Valleau

MLA for Melfort
- In office 1934–1948
- Preceded by: John MacFarlane
- Succeeded by: John Egnatoff

Minister of Social Welfare/ Provincial Secretary
- In office 1944–1948

Personal details
- Born: March 20, 1892 Lennox and Addington County, Ontario
- Died: March 6, 1976 (aged 83) California
- Party: Co-operative Commonwealth Federation
- Spouse: Eliza Storey

Oakland Woods "Oak" Valleau (March 20, 1892 – March 6, 1976) was a farmer and political figure in Saskatchewan. He represented Melfort from 1938 to 1948 in the Legislative Assembly of Saskatchewan as a Co-operative Commonwealth Federation (CCF) member.

He was born in Lennox and Addington County, Ontario, the son of William Valleau and Rebecca Woods, and was educated there. He came to Saskatchewan in 1911 and took a homestead in the Moose Range district, later farming in the Hanley, Kenaston and Aylsham areas. In 1915, he married Eliza "Minn" Storey. Valleau served in the provincial cabinet as Minister of Social Welfare and as Provincial Secretary. He was a member of the Saskatchewan Power Commission and later served on the board of directors for the Saskatchewan Power Corporation. Valleau was defeated when he ran for reelection to the assembly in 1948. From 1948 to 1962, he was chairman of the Saskatchewan Workmen's Compensation Board. Valleau died in California while visiting his son.

His son Delmar also served in the provincial assembly as an Active Service Voters' Representative.
