= Don Cody =

Canadian politician

The Honourable Don Cody ECS

MLA for Watrous
- In office 1971–1975
- Preceded by: Percy Schmeiser
- Succeeded by: Riding dissolved

MLA for Kinistino
- In office 1978–1982
- Preceded by: Arthur Thibault
- Succeeded by: Ben Boutin

Mayor of Prince Albert
- In office 1994–2003
- Succeeded by: Jim Stiglitz

Personal details
- Born: Donald William Cody; March 28, 1936 (age 90) Pilger, Saskatchewan
- Party: Saskatchewan New Democratic Party

Donald William Cody (born March 28, 1936) is a business owner and former political figure in Saskatchewan. He represented Watrous from 1971 to 1975 and Kinistino from 1978 to 1982 in the Legislative Assembly of Saskatchewan as a New Democratic Party (NDP) member

He was born in Pilger, Saskatchewan, the son of Edward Cody and Rosella Wirtz, and was educated there. Cody then worked as a telegraph operator for the Canadian Pacific Railway. In 1961, he married Joan Eileen Germsheid. From 1963 to 1967, he worked as a claims adjuster for Saskatchewan Government Insurance in Regina. Then, Cody was claims examiner and Saskatchewan claims supervisor for Co-op Insurance Services Ltd.

Cody was defeated by John Gary Lane when he ran for the Qu'Appelle seat in the provincial assembly in 1975. He served in the Saskatchewan cabinet as Minister of Co-operation and Co-operative Development and as Minister of Telephones. He was defeated by Bernard Boutin when he ran for reelection to the provincial assembly in 1982.

After leaving politics, Cody moved to Prince Albert, where he became the owner of Buns Master Bakery. From 1994 to 2003, he was mayor of Prince Albert. He also served as chair of the board for Saskatchewan Government Insurance.

The former mayor of Prince Albert is also known for his drinking and driving conviction. Cody was arrested March 26, 2003, at his house for being suspected of impaired driving. The police did not immediately charge Cody which ultimately led to accusations of a cover up. During the trial, the courts heard that he had been pulled over and two constables took him to the police station for a breath sample. Of note was the sample wasn't taken and he was instead driven to the home of then- police chief John Quinn.

Cody was only charged after police from Regina were called in to investigate. Mr. Cody testified during his trial that he had been drinking that day, but wasn't impaired. As a result, the former chief Quinn and two senior officers were suspended immediately after the case became public, Quinn later resigned. The officers, Staff Sergeant Kelly Liebrecht and Inspector Norm Bergen, each faced a charge of obstruction, as well as a combined 15 charges under the Police Act.

Cody held the mayor's seat from 1994 to October 2003. Cody served as the Councillor for Prince Albert Ward 4 from 2012 to 2024.

== Electoral history ==
1971 Saskatchewan general election: Watrous electoral district
Party	Candidate	Votes	%	±%
NDP	Don W. Cody	3,318	52.71%	+7.94
Liberal	Percy A. Schmeiser	2,552	40.54%	-5.36
Prog. Conservative	Jack B. Pearce	425	6.75%	-2.58
Total		6,295	100.00%	

1978 Saskatchewan general election: Kinistino electoral district
Party	Candidate	Votes	%	±%
NDP	Donald Cody	4,042	54.55%	+10.34
Progressive Conservative	Louis A. Domotor	2,661	35.92%	+13.13
Liberal	Robert G. Michayluk	706	9.53%	-23.47
Total		7,409	100.00%	

1982 Saskatchewan general election: Kinistino electoral district
Party	Candidate	Votes	%	±%
Progressive Conservative	Bernard Boutin	4,266	51.57%	+15.65
NDP	Donald Cody	3,759	45.44%	-9.11
Liberal	Ed Olchowy	247	2.99%	-6.54
Total		8,272	100.00%	

1986 Saskatchewan general election: Kinistino electoral district
Party	Candidate	Votes	%	±%
Progressive Conservative	Joe Saxinger	3,900	49.11%	-2.46
NDP	Don Cody	3,748	47.20%	+1.76
Liberal	Ray L. Manegre	293	3.69%	+0.70
Total		7,941	100.00%	
