= Todd Goudy =

Canadian politician

The Honourable Todd Goudy ECS MLA

29th Speaker of the Legislative Assembly of Saskatchewan
- Incumbent
- Assumed office November 25, 2024
- Preceded by: Randy Weekes

Member of the Legislative Assembly of Saskatchewan for Melfort
- Incumbent
- Assumed office March 1, 2018
- Preceded by: Kevin Phillips

Personal details
- Party: Saskatchewan Party

Todd Goudy is a Canadian politician, who was elected to the Legislative Assembly of Saskatchewan in a by-election on March 1, 2018. He represents the electoral district of Melfort as a member of the Saskatchewan Party. He has served as the Secretary to the Minister of Education, Secretary for Francophone Affairs, and Secretary for Parks, Culture and Sports and also spent time as Provincial Secretary, Legislative Secretary to the Premier, Government Whip, a member of the provincial Treasury Board, and a member of the Public Accounts Committee.

Goudy was elected Speaker of the Legislative Assembly of Saskatchewan on November 25, 2024.

Goudy grew up on a farm outside of Melfort but moved to Albania shortly after graduation in the 1990s to after the collapse of communism. Was a pastor in Springbrook Alberta. When he returned to Saskatchewan, entered ministry in the Baptist church, owned a furniture manufacturing company, and served on the school board of the Northeast School Division for a decade. He and his wife Tannis have six children.

== Cabinet Position ==
Saskatchewan provincial government of Scott Moe
Cabinet post (1)
| Predecessor | Office | Successor |
|---|---|---|
| Nadine Wilson | Provincial Secretary of Saskatchewan; August 13, 2019–November 9, 2020 | Lyle Stewart |
