= James Smith Cree Nation =

Cree First Nation band government whose reserve is in Melfort, Saskatchewan, Canada

The James Smith First Nation (Cree: ᓂᐦᑖᐏᑭᐦᒋᑲᓂᕽ nihtâwikihcikanihk, meaning: at the place of good growth) is a Plains Cree Indigenous band government whose reserve is north of Melfort, Saskatchewan, Canada. James Smith has two reserves, James Smith 100 and Cumberland 100A. James Smith has a current population of 2,412, with the on-reserve population estimated to be at 1,592 members. James Smith is part of the Prince Albert Grand Council. Bordering the reserve are the rural municipalities of Kinistino No. 459 and Torch River No. 488.

== History ==
The First Nation takes its name after Chief James Smith, a brother of Chief John Smith, who founded the Muskoday First Nation.

James Smith signed Treaty Six at Fort Carlton in 1876. The population at the time of the signing was 134 members or 32 families. The original language spoken was Cree. James Smith, alongside John Smith, migrated to the area from the Red River district of Manitoba, and his Cree name has been recorded as Notaw(k)eecheekanis (ᓂᐦᒑᐏᑭᐦᒋᑲᓂᐢ nihcâwikihcikanis). However, the term ᓂᐦᑖᐏᑭᐦᒋᑲᓂᕽ nihtâwikihcikanihk means "good growing area" and is better applied to the community rather than the chief.

The Chakastaypasin First Nation later joined the people of James Smith following the dissolution of their reserve near St. Louis, Saskatchewan, after the North-West Rebellion. As they are separate signatories to Treaty 6, the Chakastapaysin do have some legal status as a separate nation, but their status as a separate First Nation remains in limbo, while an inquiry announced in 1999 has yet to move forward.

The people of the Peter Chapman First Nation were incorporated into the same band in 1902, but they are generally recognized as a separate band, with their legal status disputed both in court and by an ongoing commission of inquiry. Recently the three nations who had been forced under one government by the name of James Smith decided to separate into their founding bands.

The Margaret Turner Health Clinic, named after Margaret Turner in memory of her health work in the 1980s–90s, is located in the Middle Village.

The Bernard Constant Community School (BCCS), formerly known as James Smith School, was renamed after teacher Bernard Constant in the 1990s. The James Smith School was originally in the South Village but in 1991 it was torn down and the new school was built in the Middle Village which opened on May 2, 1992. Buildings from the 1980s–90s were demolished, due to the lack of funds, but the South Hockey Ring was left.

The current chiefs are Kirby Constant, Robert Head, and Calvin Sanderson.

== 2022 stabbings ==
On September 4, 2022, multiple people were stabbed at the James Smith Cree Nation. 11 people were killed, and 17 others were injured. The perpetrator, Myles Sanderson was arrested on September 7, 2022, but died shortly thereafter by a cocaine overdose. Among those killed was the perpetrator's brother, Damien Sanderson, who was initially considered a suspect, but was later reclassified as a victim of the stabbings.

== See also ==
- Muskoday First Nation
- Fort de la Corne
