= Rod Gantefoer =

Canadian politician

Member of the Saskatchewan Legislative Assembly for Melfort Melfort-Tisdale (1995-2003)
- In office June 21, 1995 – October 10, 2011
- Preceded by: Carol Carson
- Succeeded by: Kevin Phillips

Saskatchewan Minister of Finance
- In office November 21, 2007 – June 29, 2010
- Premier: Brad Wall
- Preceded by: Pat Atkinson
- Succeeded by: Ken Krawetz

Personal details
- Born: May 15, 1947 (age 78) Watson, Saskatchewan, Canada
- Party: Liberal → Saskatchewan Party

Rod Gantefoer SOM (born May 15, 1947) is a Canadian former provincial politician. He was a member of the Legislative Assembly of Saskatchewan from 1995 to 2011, representing the constituencies of Melfort-Tisdale from 1995 to 2003 and Melfort from 2003 to 2011.

Originally elected as a Liberal, he became part of the Saskatchewan Party caucus in 1997. In April 1998, Gantefoer was a candidate for the Saskatchewan Party leadership, but was defeated on the second ballot by Elwin Hermanson.

After the Saskatchewan Party's victory in the 2007 election, he was appointed Minister of Finance and Government House Leader.

Gantefoer announced in February 2010 that he has been diagnosed with Parkinson's disease, and later announced that he would not run in the 2011 election. He was shuffled out of cabinet on June 29, 2010.
