= John George Egnatoff =

Canadian politician and educator

John George Egnatoff, CM (August 18, 1914 – August 12, 2005) was an educator and political figure in Saskatchewan. He represented Melfort from 1948 to 1952 in the Legislative Assembly of Saskatchewan as a Liberal.

He was born near Perdue, Saskatchewan. He worked as a teacher and school administrator in rural Saskatchewan, Nigeria and Saskatoon from 1935 to 1978. He was defeated by Clarence George Willis when he ran for election in the newly created riding of Melfort-Tisdale in 1952. Egnatoff ran for the leadership of the Saskatchewan Liberal Party in 1954. From 1968 to 1975, he was professor and head of the department of educational administration at the University of Saskatchewan. In 1981, he was named to the Order of Canada. Egnatoff died in Saskatoon at the age of 90.

Dr. John G. Egnatoff School in Saskatoon's Erindale neighborhood, along with Egnatoff Crescent & Way in the Silverwood Heights neighborhood were both named in his honour.
