= George Balfour Johnson =

Canadian politician

George Balfour Johnson (March 21, 1865 – 1940) was a Scottish-born general merchant and political figure in Saskatchewan. His surname also appears as Johnston in some sources. He represented Kinistino from 1908 to 1912 and Melfort from 1912 to 1925 in the Legislative Assembly of Saskatchewan as a Provincial Rights Party member.

He was born in Romano Bridge, Peeblesshire, the son of John Johnson, and educated in Aberdeen. He came to Canada in 1884. In 1892, Johnson married Frances May Hayward. Johnson was mayor of Melfort from 1907 to 1908.
