= Cumberland 100A =

Indian reserve in Saskatchewan, Canada

Coordinates: 53°03′45″N 104°50′12″W

- Indian reserve
- Cumberland Indian Reserve No. 100A
- Location in Saskatchewan
- First Nation: James Smith
- Country: Canada
- Province: Saskatchewan

Area
  - Total: 7,899.2 ha (19,519 acres)

Population (2016)
  - Total: 317
  - Density: 4.01/km^{2} (10.4/sq mi)
- Community Well-Being Index: 50

Cumberland 100A is an Indian reserve of the James Smith Cree Nation in Saskatchewan. It is 161 kilometres (100 mi) south-east of Prince Albert. The 2016 Canadian Census, recorded a population of 317 living in 79 of its 82 total private dwellings. In the same year, its Community Well-Being index was calculated at 50 of 100, compared to 58.4 for the average First Nations community and 77.5 for the average non-Indigenous community.

== See also ==
- List of Indian reserves in Saskatchewan
