= James Smith 100 =

Indian reserve in Saskatchewan, Canada

Coordinates: 53°07′25″N 104°52′18″W

- Indian reserve
- James Smith Indian Reserve No. 100
- Location in Saskatchewan
- First Nation: James Smith
- Country: Canada
- Province: Saskatchewan

Area
  - Total: 7,200.3 ha (17,792 acres)

Population (2016)
  - Total: 743
  - Density: 10.3/km^{2} (26.7/sq mi)
- Community Well-Being Index: 46

James Smith 100 is an Indian reserve of the James Smith Cree Nation in Saskatchewan. It is about 58 kilometres (36 mi) east of Prince Albert. In the 2016 Canadian Census, it recorded a population of 743 living in 152 of its 152 total private dwellings. In the same year, its Community Well-Being index was calculated at 46 of 100, compared to 58.4 for the average First Nations community and 77.5 for the average non-Indigenous community.

== See also ==
- List of Indian reserves in Saskatchewan
