= John Richard Parish Taylor =

Canadian politician

- Born: June 19, 1892; Belbroughton, Worcestershire, England
- Died: 1950 (aged 57–58); Birch Hills, Saskatchewan, Canada
- Occupation: Politician

John Richard Parish Taylor (June 19, 1892 – 1950) was an English-born political figure in Saskatchewan. He represented Kinistino from 1917 to 1925 and from 1933 to 1944 in the Legislative Assembly of Saskatchewan as a Liberal.

He was born in Belbroughton, Worcestershire, the son of James Henry Taylor and Mary Parish, and came to Canada in 1905. Taylor was educated in Chicago. In 1924, he married a Miss Midnie. Taylor lived in Birch Hills, Saskatchewan. He did not run for reelection to the provincial assembly in 1925 or 1929. He was elected again to the provincial assembly in a 1933 by-election held after Charles McIntosh became a government supporter, was named to the provincial cabinet and subsequently ran for reelection.
