= Delmar Valleau =

Canadian politician

Delmar Storey Valleau (July 1, 1917 – August 5, 2000) was a farmer and political figure in Saskatchewan and an educator in California. He was an Active Service Voters' Representative in the Legislative Assembly of Saskatchewan from 1944 to 1948 representing members of the Canadian armed services on active duty in Great Britain.

He was born in Saskatoon, Saskatchewan, the son of Oakland Woods Valleau and Minnie Storie, and was educated in Regina. Valleau served in the Royal Canadian Air Force during World War II. In 1945, he married Olive Greer. Valleau ran unsuccessfully for a seat in the Canadian House of Commons in 1949 as a Co-operative Commonwealth Federation candidate, losing to John Diefenbaker in the Lake Centre riding. He later moved to California, where he received a PhD from UCLA and then joined the faculty of Sonoma State University, serving as chair of the School of Social Science and then the Department of Management for the university.
