= Bernard J. Leger Boutin =

Canadian politician

Ben Boutin

MLA for Kinistino
- In office 1982–1986
- Preceded by: Don Cody
- Succeeded by: Joe Saxinger

Personal details
- Born: Bernard Joseph Leger Boutin; March 29, 1953 Cudworth, Saskatchewan
- Died: 1986 (aged 32–33)
- Party: Saskatchewan Progressive Conservative Party

Bernard Joseph Leger "Ben" Boutin (March 29, 1953 – 1986) was a farmer and political figure in Saskatchewan. He represented Kinistino from 1982 to 1986 in the Legislative Assembly of Saskatchewan as a Progressive Conservative.

He was born in Cudworth, Saskatchewan, the son of Jean-Marie Boutin. He lived in Domremy.

== Electoral history ==
1982 Saskatchewan general election: Kinistino electoral district
Party	Candidate	Votes	%	±%
Progressive Conservative	Bernard Boutin	4,266	51.57%	+15.65
NDP	Donald Cody	3,759	45.44%	-9.11
Liberal	Ed Olchowy	247	2.99%	-6.54
Total		8,272	100.00%	
