= Rural Municipality of Lakeside No. 338 =

Rural municipality in Saskatchewan, Canada

Lakeside No. 338
- Rural municipality
- Rural Municipality of Lakeside No. 338
- Location of the RM of Lakeside No. 338 in Saskatchewan
- Coordinates: 52.032°N 104.386°W
- Country: Canada
- Province: Saskatchewan
- Census division: 10
- SARM division: 4
- Formed: December 12, 1910

Government
  - Reeve: Arnold Boyko
  - Governing body: RM of Lakeside No. 338 Council
  - Administrator: Julie Knafelc
  - Office location: Quill Lake

Area (2016)
  - Land: 636.8 km^{2} (245.9 sq mi)

Population (2016)
  - Total: 415
  - Density: 0.7/km^{2} (1.8/sq mi)
- Time zone: CST
  - Summer (DST): CST
- Area codes: 306 and 639

The Rural Municipality of Lakeside No. 338 (2016 population: 415) is a rural municipality (RM) in the Canadian province of Saskatchewan within Census Division No. 10 and SARM Division No. 4. It is located in the east-central portion of the province.

== History ==
The RM of Lakeside No. 338 incorporated as a rural municipality on December 12, 1910.

== Geography ==
=== Communities and localities ===
The following urban municipalities are surrounded by the RM.

Towns

- Watson

Villages

- Quill Lake

The following unincorporated communities are within the RM.

Localities

- Lampard
- Wimmer

== Demographics ==
Population history (1981–2016)
Year	Pop.	±%
1981	683	—
1986	651	−4.7%
1991	606	−6.9%
1996	523	−13.7%
2001	480	−8.2%
2006	444	−7.5%
2011	387	−12.8%
2016	415	+7.2%
Source: Statistics Canada via Saskatchewan Bureau of Statistics

In the 2021 Census of Population conducted by Statistics Canada, the RM of Lakeside No. 338 had a population of 396 living in 120 of its 129 total private dwellings, a change of −4.6% from its 2016 population of 415. With a land area of 653.88 km^{2} (252.46 sq mi), it had a population density of 0.6/km^{2} (1.6/sq mi) in 2021.

In the 2016 Census of Population, the RM of Lakeside No. 338 recorded a population of 415 living in 141 of its 154 total private dwellings, a 7.2% change from its 2011 population of 387. With a land area of 636.8 km^{2} (245.9 sq mi), it had a population density of 0.7/km^{2} (1.7/sq mi) in 2016.

== Economy ==
Its economy is predominantly agricultural.

== Government ==
The RM of Lakeside No. 338 is governed by an elected municipal council and an appointed administrator that meets on the second Thursday of every month. The reeve of the RM is Arnold Boyko while its administrator is Julie Knafelc. The RM's office is located in Quill Lake.
