= Lyle Odelein =

Canadian ice hockey player (1968–2026)

- Born: July 21, 1968 Quill Lake, Saskatchewan, Canada
- Died: October 3, 2026 (aged 58) Fox Chapel, Pennsylvania, U.S.
- Height: 5 ft 11 in (180 cm)
- Weight: 200 lb (91 kg; 14 st 4 lb)
- Position: Defence
- Shot: Right
- Played for: Montreal Canadiens; New Jersey Devils; Phoenix Coyotes; Columbus Blue Jackets; Chicago Blackhawks; Dallas Stars; Florida Panthers; Pittsburgh Penguins
- National team: Canada
- NHL draft: 141st overall, 1986; Montreal Canadiens
- Playing career: 1989–2006

Lyle Theodore Odelein (July 21, 1968 – October 3, 2026) was a Canadian professional ice hockey defenceman who played for eight National Hockey League (NHL) teams in 16 seasons. He was the inaugural captain of the Columbus Blue Jackets when the NHL expanded in 2000.

== Playing career ==
Odelein played junior hockey for the Moose Jaw Warriors before being drafted by the Montreal Canadiens in the seventh round (141st overall) in 1986. Initially after the draft, he played for the Sherbrooke Canadiens in the American Hockey League. He made his NHL debut on February 22, 1990, and collected an assist in that game visiting the Quebec Nordiques. For his first NHL goal, Odelein had to skate around and outmaneuver Chicago Blackhawks defensemen František Kučera and Steve Smith to score against goalie Ed Belfour on December 19, 1991.

His playing style adapted through his career; primarily used as a defensive defenceman early in his career (as well as an enforcer), he became more of a two-way threat when then Canadiens coach Jacques Demers began using him on the power play.

He won the Stanley Cup with the Montreal Canadiens in 1993.

The 1993–94 NHL season marked Odelein's career highlight. He scored 11 goals, 29 assists and 40 points, all career highs, scoring 24 of those points in 26 games in February and March that season. He scored a hat trick, a power play goal in each period, against the St. Louis Blues and goalie Jim Hrivnak on March 9, 1994. His five assists on February 2, 1994, against the Hartford Whalers tied the single-game record for a Canadiens defenceman held by Doug Harvey, which was also tied in 2004 by Sheldon Souray. He became one of the Canadiens' alternate captains during the 1995-96 season.

In 1996, Odelein represented Canada at the inaugural World Cup of Hockey, appearing in two matches in the tournament as Canada finished in second place.

Prior to the 1996–97 season, Odelein was traded by the Canadiens to the New Jersey Devils for Stéphane Richer on August 22, 1996. During the 1999–2000 season, his fourth with the Devils, Odelein was traded by the Devils to the Phoenix Coyotes for Deron Quint and a third round selection on March 7, 2000.

Odelein's tenure with the Coyotes was short as he was claimed by the Columbus Blue Jackets in the 2000 NHL expansion draft. He was later named the first captain of the Blue Jackets for their inaugural season in 2000–01.

During his second season in Columbus, Odelein was traded to the Chicago Blackhawks for defenceman Jaroslav Špaček. The following season he was on the move again when he was traded to the Dallas Stars in March 2003. After just three regular season games and two more in the playoffs, he was done in Dallas and found himself without a guaranteed contract offer in the off-season.

His next opportunity came from the Florida Panthers who offered him a tryout that proved successful and led to a $650,000 one-year contract for the 2003-04 season. He played his 1000th NHL game on January 31, 2004, visiting the New York Islanders. For the first—and only—time in his career, Odelein stayed healthy for the full season and played in all 82 games for the Panthers. The Panthers' general manager Rick Dudley expressed interest in retaining Odelein, but a lockout then erased the ensuing 2004-05 season.

Odelein's final NHL stint came with the Pittsburgh Penguins when he inked a one-year, $500,000 deal on September 2, 2005. However, he managed just 27 games before injuring his knee, gaining just a single assist, and retired from professional hockey.

After playing for 8 teams in 16 seasons, Odelein finished his NHL career with 50 goals and 202 assists in 1056 games, and also 184 fights and 2,316 career penalty minutes, placing him 30th all-time.

== Personal life and death ==
Odelein was born on July 21, 1968, in Quill Lake, Saskatchewan, Canada. His brother Selmar (b. 1966) played briefly for the Edmonton Oilers before playing for Team Canada and moving to Europe. Another brother Lee (1967-2017) served as head coach of the Yorkton Terriers in the Saskatchewan Junior Hockey League from 1993 to 1998.

In March 2018, Odelein was hospitalized and diagnosed with critical illness polyneuropathy, after falling into a coma and suffering paralysis. Odelein underwent a heart valve, liver, and kidney transplant at Allegheny General Hospital in Pennsylvania. He was released from a rehabilitation facility in July 2018 and was walking unaided by September 2018.

Odelein died from a heart attack in Fox Chapel, Pennsylvania, on October 3, 2026, at the age of 58.

== Career statistics ==
=== Regular season and playoffs ===
			Regular season					Playoffs
Season	Team	League	GP	G	A	Pts	PIM	GP	G	A	Pts	PIM
1985–86	Moose Jaw Warriors	WHL	67	9	37	46	117	13	1	6	7	34
1986–87	Moose Jaw Warriors	WHL	59	9	50	59	70	9	2	5	7	26
1987–88	Moose Jaw Warriors	WHL	63	15	43	58	166	—	—	—	—	—
1988–89	Peoria Rivermen	IHL	36	2	8	10	116	—	—	—	—	—
1988–89	Sherbrooke Canadiens	AHL	33	3	4	7	120	3	0	2	2	5
1989–90	Sherbrooke Canadiens	AHL	68	7	24	31	265	12	6	5	11	79
1989–90	Montreal Canadiens	NHL	8	0	2	2	33	—	—	—	—	—
1990–91	Montreal Canadiens	NHL	52	0	2	2	259	12	0	0	0	54
1991–92	Montreal Canadiens	NHL	71	1	7	8	212	7	0	0	0	11
1992–93	Montreal Canadiens	NHL	83	2	14	16	205	20	1	5	6	30
1993–94	Montreal Canadiens	NHL	79	11	29	40	276	7	0	0	0	17
1994–95	Montreal Canadiens	NHL	48	3	7	10	152	—	—	—	—	—
1995–96	Montreal Canadiens	NHL	79	3	14	17	230	6	1	1	2	6
1996–97	New Jersey Devils	NHL	79	3	13	16	110	10	2	2	4	19
1997–98	New Jersey Devils	NHL	79	4	19	23	171	6	1	1	2	21
1998–99	New Jersey Devils	NHL	70	5	26	31	114	7	0	3	3	10
1999–00	New Jersey Devils	NHL	57	1	15	16	104	—	—	—	—	—
1999–00	Phoenix Coyotes	NHL	16	1	7	8	19	5	0	0	0	16
2000–01	Columbus Blue Jackets	NHL	81	3	14	17	118	—	—	—	—	—
2001–02	Columbus Blue Jackets	NHL	65	2	14	16	89	—	—	—	—	—
2001–02	Chicago Blackhawks	NHL	12	0	2	2	4	4	0	1	1	25
2002–03	Chicago Blackhawks	NHL	65	7	4	11	76	—	—	—	—	—
2002–03	Dallas Stars	NHL	3	0	0	0	6	2	0	0	0	0
2003–04	Florida Panthers	NHL	82	4	12	16	88	—	—	—	—	—
2005–06	Pittsburgh Penguins	NHL	27	0	1	1	50	—	—	—	—	—
NHL totals			1,056	50	202	252	2,316	86	5	13	18	209

=== International ===
Year	Team	Event	Result	GP	G	A	Pts	PIM
1996	Canada	WCH	2nd place, silver medalist(s)	2	0	0	0	0
Senior totals				2	0	0	0	0

== Awards and honours ==
Award	Year
NHL
Stanley Cup (Montreal Canadiens)	1992–93

== See also ==
- Fighting in ice hockey
- List of NHL players with 1,000 games played
- List of NHL players with 2,000 career penalty minutes

Sporting positions
Preceded by Position created	Columbus Blue Jackets captain 2000–02	Succeeded by Ray Whitney
