= Watson, Saskatchewan =

Town in Saskatchewan, Canada

Watson
- Town
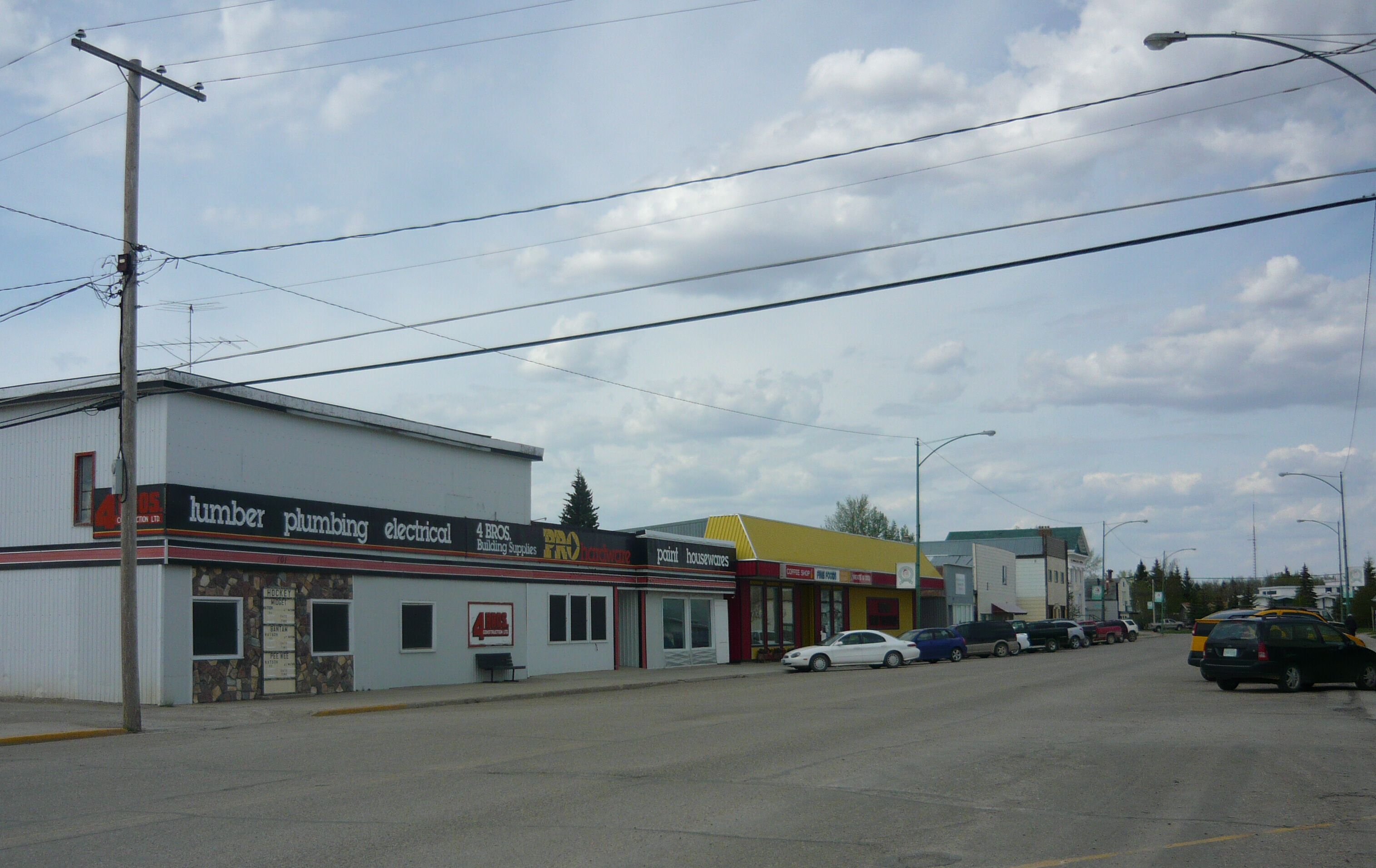
- Main Street
- Motto: Industrial Crossroads of Saskatchewan
- Location in Saskatchewan Watson (Canada)
- Coordinates: 52°7′46″N 104°31′8″W
- Country: Canada
- Provinces and territories of Canada: Saskatchewan
- Rural Municipalities (RM): Lakeside No. 338
- Post office founded (as Vossen): 1904-04-01
- Incorporated (village): 1906-05-01
- Incorporated (town): August 1, 1908

Government
  - Mayor: Bruce Nordick

Area
  - Total: 2.83 km^{2} (1.09 sq mi)

Population (2016)
  - Total: 697
  - Density: 274.7/km^{2} (711/sq mi)
  - Summer (DST): CST

Watson is a town of 777 residents in the Rural Municipality of Lakeside No. 338, in the Canadian province of Saskatchewan. Watson is located on the intersection of Highway 5 and Highway 6, the CanAm Highway. Watson is approximately the same distance from Saskatoon to the west, and Regina to the south, which gives rise to its town motto, "Industrial Crossroads of Saskatchewan".

== History ==
Settlers began arriving in the early 1900s, many of them German American Catholics. The first post office in the area was established on April 1, 1904 and named Vossen after its postmaster, Frank J. Vossen Jr. It was changed to Watson on May 1, 1906, in advance of the village's incorporation on October 6, 1906. The village became a town on August 1, 1908. The town's namesake is Senator Robert Watson. Senator Watson originally owned the land the town was built on. Watson celebrated its first Santa Claus Day in 1932, and in 1996 erected a 25-foot (7.6 m)-high Santa Claus to commemorate the event.

== Demographics ==
In the 2021 Census of Population conducted by Statistics Canada, Watson had a population of 707 living in 319 of its 356 total private dwellings, a change of 1.4% from its 2016 population of 697. With a land area of 2.96 km^{2} (1.14 sq mi), it had a population density of 238.9/km^{2} (618.6/sq mi) in 2021.

Canada census – Watson, Saskatchewan community profile

| | 2011 |
| Population | 777 (8.1% from 2006) |
| Land area | 2.83 km^{2} (1.09 sq mi) |
| Population density | 274.7/km^{2} (711/sq mi) |
| Median age | 48.0 (M: 45.5, F: 49.1) |
| Private dwellings | 364 (total) |
| Median household income | $N/A |

References: 2011

== Geography ==
Jansen Lake, Houghton Lake, Lenore Lake, Ironspring Creek, and the Quill Lakes are all close to Watson.

== McNab Regional Park ==
McNab Regional Park (52.1227°N 104.5284°W) is a regional park on the south side of Watson. Access is from Highway 6. The park has a golf course, campground, mini-golf, swimming pool, and playground. The golf course is a 9-hole, par 35 grass greens course. The men's tees total 3,174 yards while the women's total 2,946. The clubhouse is licensed and there are rentals available.

The park, founded in 1980, was named after the Peter McNab family. Peter McNab was a professional ice hockey player who played on five different NHL teams during the 1970s and 1980s. Max McNab, who also played in the NHL and was born in Watson, was there at the time to officially open the park.

In 2001, the park was upgraded with an expanded golf course, grass greens, a new clubhouse, and a larger pool complex. In 2023, it won the Park on the Move award.

== Transportation ==
The town is located at the junction of Saskatchewan Highway 5 and Saskatchewan Highway 6.

Railway

Melfort Subdivision C.P.R—serves Lanigan, Leroy, Watson, Spalding

Margo Subdivision Canadian National Railway

== Notable people ==
- Dustin Tokarski — NHL Goaltender
- Ross Lonsberry — NHL Player
- Max McNab — NHL Player, Coach, GM
- Rod Gantefoer — Legislative Assembly of Saskatchewan MLA, Finance

== See also ==
- List of towns in Saskatchewan
