= Bonne Madone =

Coordinates: 52°40′0.3″N 105°29′3.7″W

Location of Bonne Madone in Saskatchewan

Bonne Madone is an unincorporated community founded in 1902 in the Rural Municipality of Hoodoo No. 401, in Saskatchewan.

== History ==
The area of Bonne Madone was granted by the federal government to French settlers, the main contingent of which arrived in 1902 from Dauphiné and Franche-Comté, led by fathers Laurent Voisin and Jean Garnier. A convent run by the Sisters of Providence was established there in 1905.

A school was built there in 1908, and the town's chapel was first built in 1910. Later in that decade was built a Wood-framed church, which burned in 1918, but was rebuilt in 1920. A Royal North-West Mounted Police station and a Post office were also located there, the latter closing in 1963.

It was an active community in the 1920s and the 1930s, but its population dwindled due to farm size adjustments. It was designated as heritage property in 1982, and became a municipal heritage property on June 15, 2004.
