= Selmar Odelein =

Canadian ice hockey player (born 1966)

- Born: April 11, 1966 (age 60) Quill Lake, Saskatchewan, Canada
- Height: 6 ft 0 in (183 cm)
- Weight: 195 lb (88 kg; 13 st 13 lb)
- Position: Defence
- Shot: Right
- Played for: Edmonton Oilers; Innsbrucker EV; VEU Feldkirch; Nottingham Panthers; Sheffield Steelers
- NHL draft: 21st overall, 1984; Edmonton Oilers
- Playing career: 1986–1994

Selmar Odelein (born April 11, 1966) is a Canadian former professional ice hockey player who played 18 games in the National Hockey League.

== Playing career ==
Odelein started his career with the Regina Pats in the Western Hockey League and was the first-round pick of the Edmonton Oilers in the 1984 NHL entry draft, 21st overall. He attended Luther College high school in Regina, Saskatchewan.

Odelein scored 0 goals and 2 assists in 18 games over three seasons with the Edmonton Oilers and also played with the Oilers' affiliates before spending a season with Team Canada. He spent two years in Austria playing for Innsbrucker EV and Feldkirch VEU before moving to the British Hockey League. He played a season each for the Nottingham Panthers and Sheffield Steelers before injury forced him to retire.

Odelein's brother Lyle won a Stanley Cup with the Montreal Canadiens in 1992–93. Another brother, Lee, also played professionally in Europe.

== Career statistics ==
			Regular season					Playoffs
Season	Team	League	GP	G	A	Pts	PIM	GP	G	A	Pts	PIM
1982–83	Regina Pat Canadians Midget AAA	SMHL	70	30	84	114	38	—	—	—	—	—
1982–83	Regina Pats	WHL	1	0	0	0	0	—	—	—	—	—
1983–84	Regina Pats	WHL	71	9	42	51	45	23	4	11	15	45
1984–85	Regina Pats	WHL	64	24	35	59	121	8	2	2	4	13
1985–86	Regina Pats	WHL	36	13	28	41	57	8	5	2	7	24
1985–86	Edmonton Oilers	NHL	4	0	0	0	0	—	—	—	—	—
1986–87	Nova Scotia Oilers	AHL	2	0	1	1	2	—	—	—	—	—
1987–88	Nova Scotia Oilers	AHL	43	9	14	23	75	5	0	1	1	31
1987–88	Edmonton Oilers	NHL	12	0	2	2	33	—	—	—	—	—
1988–89	Cape Breton Oilers	AHL	63	8	21	29	150	—	—	—	—	—
1988–89	Edmonton Oilers	NHL	2	0	0	0	2	—	—	—	—	—
1990–91	Innsbrucker EV	Austria	38	9	21	30	71	—	—	—	—	—
1991–92	VEU Feldkirch	Austria	29	9	18	27	34	—	—	—	—	—
1992–93	Nottingham Panthers	BHL	23	17	18	35	48	7	5	10	15	12
1993–94	Sheffield Steelers	BHL	25	5	21	26	28	4	0	4	4	6
NHL totals			18	0	2	2	35	—	—	—	—	—
AHL totals			108	17	36	53	227	5	0	1	1	31

Preceded by Jeff Beukeboom	Edmonton Oilers first-round draft pick 1984	Succeeded by Scott Metcalfe
