= Delbert Kirsch =

Canadian politician

Member of the Saskatchewan Legislative Assembly for Batoche
- In office November 5, 2003 – October 1, 2024
- Preceded by: Riding Established
- Succeeded by: Darlene Rowden

Personal details
- Born: Middle Lake, Saskatchewan
- Party: Saskatchewan Party
- Occupation: farmer, auctioneer, youth counsellor

Delbert Kirsch is a Canadian provincial politician who served as Member of the Legislative Assembly of Saskatchewan for the constituency of Batoche from 2003 until 2024. He is a member of the Saskatchewan Party.

== Electoral history ==
=== 2020 Saskatchewan general election ===
2020 Saskatchewan general election: Batoche
Party	Candidate	Votes	%	±%
Saskatchewan	Delbert Kirsch	4,357	65.28	+0.53
New Democratic	Lon Borgerson	1,811	27.14	-3.47
Progressive Conservative	Carrie Harris	350	5.24	–
Green	Hamish Graham	156	2.34	+0.85
Total valid votes		6,674	99.43	
Total rejected ballots		38	0.57	–
Turnout		6,712	–	–
Eligible voters		–		
Saskatchewan hold		Swing		–
Source: Elections Saskatchewan

=== 2016 Saskatchewan general election ===
2016 Saskatchewan general election: Batoche
** Preliminary results — Not yet official **
Party	Candidate	Votes	%	±%
Saskatchewan	Delbert Kirsch	4,451	–	–
New Democratic	Clay DeBray	2,080	–	–
Liberal	Graham Tweten	213	–	–
Green	B. Garneau I.	101	–	–
Total valid votes		–	100.0	
Eligible voters		–		
Saskatchewan hold		Swing		-
Source: Elections Saskatchewan

=== 2011 Saskatchewan general election ===
2011 Saskatchewan general election: Batoche
Party	Candidate	Votes	%	±%
Saskatchewan	Delbert Kirsch	4,650	66.86	+7.09
New Democratic	Janice Benier	2,106	30.28	–3.86
Green	Amber Jones	199	2.86	–
Total valid votes		6,955	100.0	
Saskatchewan hold		Swing		+5.48

=== 2007 Saskatchewan general election ===
2007 Saskatchewan general election: Batoche
Party	Candidate	Votes	%	±%
Saskatchewan	Delbert Kirsch	4,523	59.77	+15.87
New Democratic	Don Hovdebo	2,583	34.14	–2.16
Liberal	Bernie Yuzdepski	461	6.09	–10.91
Total valid votes		7,567	100.0	
Saskatchewan hold		Swing		+9.02

=== 2003 Saskatchewan general election ===
2003 Saskatchewan general election: Batoche
Party	Candidate	Votes	%
Saskatchewan	Delbert Kirsch	3,349	43.90
New Democratic	Ava Bear	2,769	36.30
Liberal	Bill Yeaman	1,297	17.00
Western Independence	Florent Rabut	138	1.81
New Green	Gordon Robert Dumont	76	1.00
Total valid votes		7,629	100.0
Saskatchewan pickup new district.			
