= Grant Hodgins =

Canadian politician

Grant Milton Hodgins (born July 22, 1955) is a former political figure in Saskatchewan, Canada. He represented Melfort from 1982 to 1991 in the Legislative Assembly of Saskatchewan as a Progressive Conservative and then independent member.

He was born in Prince Albert, Saskatchewan and was educated in Melfort and at the University of Saskatchewan, where he received a commerce degree. Hodgins served in the Saskatchewan cabinet as Minister of Highways and Transportation, as Minister of Indian and Native Affairs and as Minister of Environment. He also served as government house leader in the assembly. In 1991, he resigned from the Progressive Conservative caucus to protest government policies, particularly "Fair Share Saskatchewan". After retiring from politics, he took over the operation of his family's auctioneering business.

Hodgins received a conditional discharge in the Progressive Conservative fraud scandal.
