= Quill Lake =

Village in Saskatchewan, Canada

- Village
- Motto: Goose Capital of Saskatchewan
- Location within Saskatchewan Location within Canada
- Coordinates: 52.066667°N 104.25°W
- Country: Canada
- Province: Saskatchewan
- Census division: 10
- Rural municipality: Lakeside No. 338
- Post office: 1904-02-01
- Incorporated (Village): 1907

Government
  - Deputy Mayor: Neil Marshall
  - Administrator: Julie Marshall
  - Councillors: Jim Nicholls; John Kearns; Neil Marshall; Marla Brataschuck
- Time zone: CST
- Postal code: S0A 3E0
- Area code: 306
- Highways: Highway 5 Highway 640
- Website: Village of Quill Lake Website

Quill Lake (2016 population: 387) is a village in the Canadian province of Saskatchewan within the Rural Municipality of Lakeside No. 338 and Census Division No. 10. It is 170 km east of Saskatoon and 200 km northeast of Regina.

The village is located just to the northwest of the Quill Lakes. The Quill Lakes wetland complex is a designated Western Hemisphere Shorebird Reserve Network site where many migrating shorebirds stop during long migrations. Because of this the village is also known by its residents as the "Goose Capital of Saskatchewan".

== History ==
Quill Lake was originally established as Lally, named after a railway official of the day. Later it was renamed Quill Lake to conform to the name of the post office. The community was built around the site which was originally the location of a log school house. Quill Lake incorporated as a village on December 8, 1906.

Heritage sites

Quill Lake has one municipal heritage building, the St. Michael's Anglican Church, constructed between 1907 and 1913. The wood building was built in the Gothic revival style and has a fieldstone foundation. It was previously known as the Quill Lake United Church and the Quill Lake Methodist Church. The building was designated a heritage building in 2000.

== Demographics ==
Population history (1981–2016)
| Year | Pop. | ±% |
|---|---|---|
| 1981 | 514 | — |
| 1986 | 517 | +0.6% |
| 1991 | 464 | −10.3% |
| 1996 | 463 | −0.2% |
| 2001 | 439 | −5.2% |
| 2006 | 413 | −5.9% |
| 2011 | 409 | −1.0% |
| 2016 | 387 | −5.4% |
Source: Statistics Canada via Saskatchewan Bureau of Statistics

In the 2021 Census of Population conducted by Statistics Canada, Quill Lake had a population of 377 living in 188 of its 213 total private dwellings, a change of −2.6% from its 2016 population of 387. With a land area of 1.32 km^{2} (0.51 sq mi), it had a population density of 285.6/km^{2} (739.7/sq mi) in 2021.

In the 2016 Census of Population, the Village of Quill Lake recorded a population of 387 living in 193 of its 228 total private dwellings, a −5.7% change from its 2011 population of 409. With a land area of 1.3 km^{2} (0.50 sq mi), it had a population density of 297.7/km^{2} (771.0/sq mi) in 2016.

== Notable people ==
- Ray Meiklejohn, former Saskatchewan cabinet minister
- Lyle Odelein (1968–2026), NHL hockey player
- Selmar Odelein, former NHL hockey player

== See also ==
- List of communities in Saskatchewan
