= Kinistino =

Town in Saskatchewan, Canada

- Town
- Nickname: K-Town
- Location of Kinistino in Saskatchewan Kinistino (Canada)
- Coordinates: 52.95°N 105.03°W
- Country: Canada
- Province: Saskatchewan
- Census division: No. 11
- Rural municipality: Kinistino
- Post office Founded: 1883

Government
  - Mayor: Leonard Margolis
  - Town Manager: Todd Ilnisky
  - Governing body: Kinistino Town Council
  - MLA Batoche: Delbert Kirsch
  - MP Prince Albert: Randy Hoback

Area
  - Total: 0.98 km^{2} (0.38 sq mi)

Population (2011)
  - Total: 743
  - Density: 758.8/km^{2} (1,965/sq mi)
- Time zone: UTC−6 (CST)
- Postal code: S0J 1H0
- Area code: 306
- Highways: Highway 3
- Waterways: Carrot River
- Website: townofkinistino.ca

Kinistino /kɪˈnɪstɪnoʊ/ is a town in the Canadian province of Saskatchewan. Kinistino is situated in north-central Saskatchewan. It lies on rich agricultural soil in the valley of the Carrot River, which flows a mile east of the town. Kinistino is located 30 kilometres (19 mi) northwest of Melfort on Highway 3 and 65 kilometres (40 mi) southeast of Prince Albert.

== Geography ==
The town of Kinistino rests upon a bedrock of shale in an area of maximum glacial lake coverage.

Kinistino is located in the Aspen parkland biome. The immediate area is one of moderate rolling hills and level stretches. The excellent soil is interspersed occasionally with bluffs of aspen and some sloughs. To the southwest lies the Waterhen Marsh and Lake (now drained and utilized for various farming purposes), while to the north approximately 32 kilometres (20 mi) the Saskatchewan River and the Forks of the North and South branches provide a beautiful spot of coniferous forest growth.

=== Climate ===
Like in the rest of Saskatchewan, Kinistino experiences a high variance in the seasonal temperatures. However, Kinistino is not in an area of high storm activity and usually experiences only 3 blizzards per year (as compared to Saskatoon 7, and Qu'Appelle 14). Fewer thunderstorms are experienced in Kinistino than in the south of Saskatchewan.

The frost-free period extends, on a 30-year average, from June 1 to September 6; hours of sunshine amount to 2,280. The precipitation averages are: rain 271.0 millimetres (10.67 in); and snowfall 131.0 centimetres (51.6 in).

== Demographics ==
In the 2021 Census of Population conducted by Statistics Canada, Kinistino had a population of 671 living in 265 of its 305 total private dwellings, a change of 2.6% from its 2016 population of 654. With a land area of 1.58 km^{2} (0.61 sq mi), it had a population density of 424.7/km^{2} (1,099.9/sq mi) in 2021.

Canada census – Kinistino community profile

	2021	2011
Population	671 (+2.6% from 2016)	743 (+15.6% from 2006)
Land area	1.58 km^{2} (0.61 sq mi)	0.98 km^{2} (0.38 sq mi)
Population density	426/km^{2} (1,100/sq mi)	758.8/km^{2} (1,965/sq mi)
Median age	43.2 (M: 42.8, F: 44.0)	46.6 (M: 42.5, F: 48.8)
Private dwellings	305 (total) 265 (occupied)	305 (total)
Median household income	$72,000

References: 2021 2011

== See also ==
- List of communities in Saskatchewan
- List of place names in Canada of Indigenous origin
- List of towns in Saskatchewan
