= Xena, Saskatchewan =

Community in Saskatchewan, Canada

Xena
- Locality
- Location within Morris No. 312 Location within Saskatchewan
- Coordinates: 51.7126°N 105.6033°W
- Country: Canada
- Province: Saskatchewan
- Rural municipality: Morris No. 312
- Time zone: UTC−6 (CST)

Xena, Saskatchewan (/ˈziːnə/) was a village in Saskatchewan, Canada. The last building was demolished in the 1970s. It is now an unincorporated area in the Rural Municipality of Morris No. 312. Xena is on Highway 2 in central Saskatchewan.

== History ==
Xena was part of the Grand Trunk Pacific Railway's (later the Canadian National Railway) alphabetical naming system, appearing between Watrous, Young, and Zelma. Consequentially, it is the only railway station in Western Canada ever to begin with the letter X.

== Demographics ==
The population of an unincorporated area is so small, that the census enumerates the residents as a part of the rural municipality.

== Attractions ==
Manitou and District Regional Park is located within 10 kilometres (6.2 mi).

== See also ==
- List of communities in Saskatchewan
