= Saskatchewan Highway 365 =

Provincial highway in Saskatchewan, Canada

Highway 365

Route information
- Maintained by Ministry of Highways and Infrastructure
- Length: 35.2 km (21.9 mi)

Major junctions
- South end: Highway 2 in Watrous
- North end: Highway 16 (TCH/YH) near Plunkett

Location
- Country: Canada
- Province: Saskatchewan
- Rural municipalities: Usborne, Viscount

Highway system
- Provincial highways in Saskatchewan
← Highway 364	→ Highway 367

Highway 365 is a provincial highway in the Canadian province of Saskatchewan. It connects Highway 2 (Veterans Memorial Highway) in the town of Watrous, Manitou Beach regional park, to Highway 16 (Yellowhead Highway) at Plunkett. It is about 35 kilometres (22 mi) long.

== Route description ==
Highway 365 follows Range Road 252 from Watrous at Highway 2 and travels north towards Manitou Beach. The highway is a narrow, paved two-lane road for most of its length. However, it has not been maintained well, as crude road repairs, potholes, and mud sections are common north of Manitou.

The Manitou Beach town site is at km 6; this section may cause confusion among drivers unfamiliar with the town's layout, as no Highway 365 signage is posted in this area, and there are many opportunities to accidentally exit the actual highway. It turns east along Township Road 320 and follows the south shore of Little Manitou Lake.

Highway 365 crosses Little Manitou Lake at km 10 and shifts onto Range Road 2250. At km 11, it shifts onto Township Road 324, and shifts to Range Road 2252 at km 19, where it continues north. Its northern terminus is at Highway 16 near Plunkett.

Other than Highways 2 and 16, Highway 365 only directly connects with one other Saskatchewan provincial highway, Highway 668 at km 1.

== Major intersections ==
From west to east:

Rural municipality	Location	km	mi	Destinations	Notes
Morris No. 312	Watrous	0.0	0.0	Highway 2 (Veterans Memorial Highway) – Moose Jaw, Prince Albert	Southern terminus
Morris No. 312	Watrous	1.3	0.81	Highway 668 north (Township Road 314) – Guernsey	
Morris No. 312	Manitou Beach	6.7	4.2		
Usborne No. 310		9.8	6.1	To Highway 668 / Township Road 320	
↑ / ↓		12.8	8.0	To Highway 761 east / Township Road 322 – Drake	
Viscount No. 341	Plunkett	35.2	21.9	Highway 16 (TCH/YH) – Saskatoon, Lanigan, Yorkton	Northern terminus
1.000 mi = 1.609 km; 1.000 km = 0.621 mi

== See also ==
- Transportation in Saskatchewan
- Roads in Saskatchewan
