= Manitou Beach =

Village in Saskatchewan, Canada

- Resort village
- Resort Village of Manitou Beach
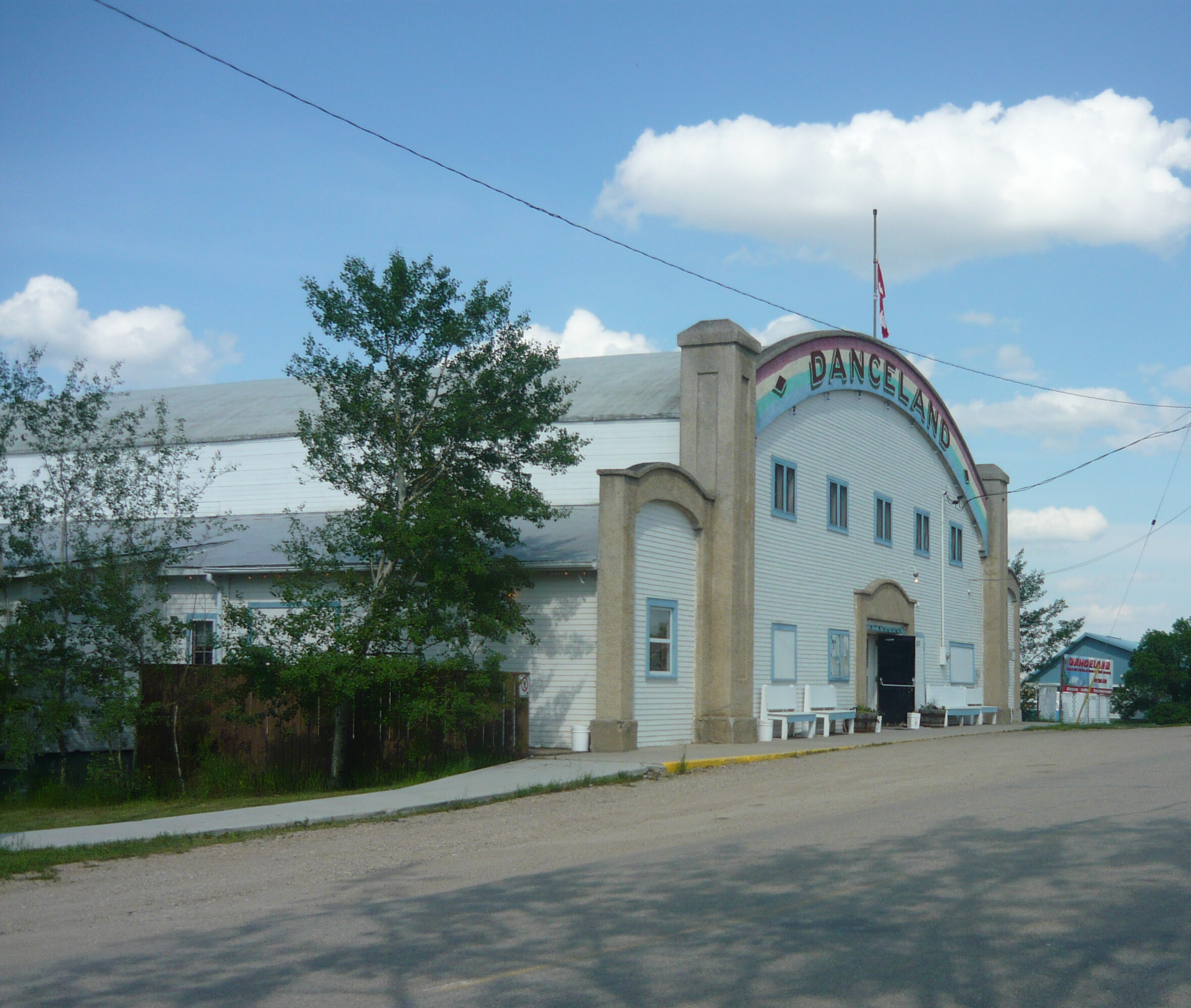
- Danceland (built 1928) on Lake Avenue (2010)

- Location within Saskatchewan Location within Canada
- Coordinates: 51.72°N 105.437°W
- Country: Canada
- Province: Saskatchewan
- Census division: 11
- Rural municipality: RM of Morris No. 312
- Incorporated: August 11, 1919

Government
  - Mayor: Cheryl Hanson
  - Governing body: Resort Village Council
  - Administrator: Ron McCullough
  - Councillors: Doug Guenther, Scott Murray, Sandra Hessdorfer, Rebecca Worobec

Area (2016)
  - Land: 3.09 km^{2} (1.19 sq mi)

Population (2016)
  - Total: 314
  - Density: 101.6/km^{2} (263/sq mi)
- Time zone: CST
  - Summer (DST): CST
- Postal code: S0K 4T1
- Area codes: 306 and 639
- Highway(s): Highway 365
- Waterway(s): Little Manitou Lake
- Website: Official website

Manitou Beach (2021 population 364) is a resort village in the Canadian province of Saskatchewan within Census Division No. 11. It is on the shores of Little Manitou Lake in the Rural Municipality of Morris No. 312. It is 5 kilometres (3.1 mi) north of Watrous and approximately 100 kilometres (62 mi) east of Saskatoon.

The village is known for its saltwater lake, the historic dance venue Danceland, and thriving cultural, art, and tourism scene.

== History ==
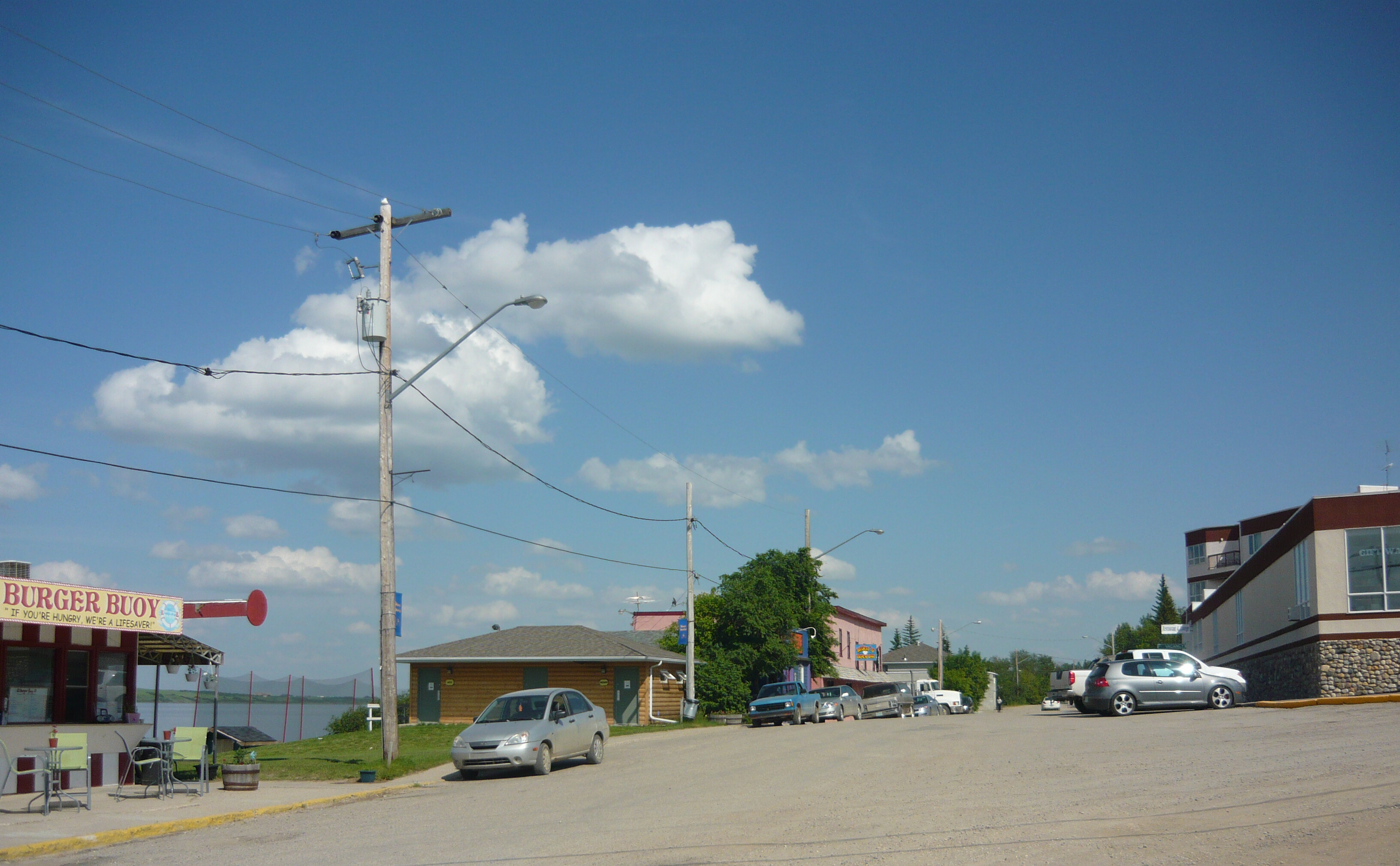
Business district on MacLachlan Avenue

Manitou Beach incorporated as a resort village on August 11, 1919.

The Beach attracted many tourists at the beginning of the 20th century. The Beach is nestled in a glacier-scooped valley on Highway 365, three miles north of Watrous, Saskatchewan.

The east and west beaches always seemed to be competing with each other and became rivals. Some would say this interfered with the growth of Manitou Beach but may also have spurred it on. In the 1920s and 30s, both sides of the beach were busy with the east beach being more popular.

In the 1920s and '30s Manitou Beach was alive. Thousands came to enjoy the mineral waters. It was the most popular summer resort on the prairies, offering an alternative, and became a rival for Banff Hot Springs.

People came by rail when Watrous became a division point of the Canadian National Railway. Excursion trains arrived from the four main cities. The tourists would ride the train to Watrous and then take a shuttle taxi to the resort. Also, thousands of automobiles would be parked in fields on weekends. The beach population would grow from 200 to 15,000 during the summer months.

The bustling resort had lots to offer any vacationer: 3 large dance halls, 2 large enclosed mineral hot bath houses, massage parlours, numerous beach stores and restaurants/cafes, several boarding houses, hotels and motels, many cottages, 2 drug stores, 3 grocery stores, 2 service stations, boat rentals, a barber shop, 4 ice-cream parlours, a Y.W.C.A. building, a moving picture show, and real estate offices.

In the 1930s, Saskatchewan was hit hard with drought, grasshoppers and poor wheat prices. Temperatures reached 100 degrees Fahrenheit (38 °C). When the depression hit, crowds stopped coming. Those that did come, didn't have much money to spend. They just wanted a cool dip in the water because the weather was hot and dry.

By the 1940s the resort was in deep trouble. Mysterious fires happened. Clinics lost their patients. Many buildings were torn down because they couldn't be maintained anymore. And the lake was receding. The change in travel habits of North American people also caused the resort to decline. Airplanes were invented and therefore long-distance travel was no longer a hardship. Tourists were drawn to the warmer coastal or tropical resorts. Recreational vehicles became popular. Holiday travel went on wheels.

Manitou Beach and its activities remained at a lower level for years awaiting rejuvenation in the late 1980s and 90s.

== Indigenous significance ==
To First Nations people in this region, Little Manitou is the lake of healing waters. Bill Strongarm, committee member and residential school support worker with Touchwood Agency Tribal Council, explains that Manitou, in Cree means "Great Spirits or the Creator" while Sakahīcan means "lake". He says the lake was called Manitou Sakahīcan because it was a place where First Nations people gathered to heal people affected with various skin diseases and other sicknesses.

=== The Legend of the Spirit of Manitou ===
Long before European settlers emigrated to Canada and the western territories, Saskatchewan was designated as part of the Great Plains of western Canada. A variety of Canadian First Nations tribes traveled throughout the land, utilizing the available resources for their survival while still respecting the land from which it came.

The arrival of the European settlers impacted the tribes in a variety of ways. One of the most devastating effects settlers had upon the First Nations people was the introduction of foreign diseases such as smallpox. The Cree people who populated the land area known as Saskatchewan were exposed to smallpox and suffered devastating losses. Traditional medicines and remedies proved ineffective against this new disease.

According to legend, some young men fell ill during their tribe's move. Fortunately, the tribe's choice of camp was in the vicinity of what is now known as Little Manitou Lake.

The men were too weak to travel so the tribe built a shelter for them before continuing their journey. It is said the afflicted men were overcome with fever and thirst and crawled their way to the lakeshore where they slaked their thirst and immersed themselves in the cool water. Spent from their efforts, they remained on the beach overnight. In the morning, the men experienced some relief from their symptoms. They attributed the respite to the water and remained on site, consuming and immersing themselves into the liquid medicine. Within days of their arrival at the lake, the young men regained their previous state of healthfulness and continued on their tribe's journey. Upon reuniting with their tribe, tribe members were astounded by the men's seemingly miraculous return to health.

So was born the legend of the healing waters of Little Manitou Lake. Medicine men named the lake Manitou in reference to the Great Spirit, which is the First Nations equivalent to the European God. As the legend of the lake with healing powers spread via word of mouth, First Nations tribes were followed by the settlers and then visitors from all parts of the world, traveling to the Lake of the Healing Waters to experience relief from a number of maladies. An entire profession of healing and therapeutic products sprang up from the lake resources, a profession that is still strong and vibrant today in the new millennium.

== Demographics ==
Population history (1981–2016)
Year	Pop.	±%
1981	134	—
1986	147	+9.7%
1991	138	−6.1%
1996	147	+6.5%
2001	212	+44.2%
2006	233	+9.9%
2011	257	+10.3%
2016	314	+22.2%
Source: Statistics Canada via Saskatchewan Bureau of Statistics

In the 2021 Census of Population conducted by Statistics Canada, Manitou Beach had a population of 364 living in 200 of its 388 total private dwellings, a change of 15.9% from its 2016 population of 314. With a land area of 2.28 km^{2} (0.88 sq mi), it had a population density of 159.6/km^{2} (413.5/sq mi) in 2021.

In the 2016 Census of Population conducted by Statistics Canada, the Resort Village of Manitou Beach recorded a population of 314 living in 154 of its 370 total private dwellings, a 22.2% change from its 2011 population of 257. With a land area of 3.09 km^{2} (1.19 sq mi), it had a population density of 101.6/km^{2} (263.2/sq mi) in 2016.

== Camp Easter Seal ==
In the early 1930s, the government decided to construct a luxurious resort hotel as a relief project, using almost exclusively local materials. The Park Chalet was constructed in Manitou Lake Provincial Park by unemployed workers using fieldstone from local quarries. The original buildings had thatched roofs made from reeds and rushes. The resort consisted of 290 acres and was located on the west beach. It was operated as a commercial hotel until the early 1950s.

In 1956 the provincial government sold the Park Chalet to the Saskatchewan Society for Crippled Children for $1.00. It became a summer resident camp for individuals experiencing disability. The 290 acre property was divided. 100 acres went to Camp Easter Seal and 190 acres were kept for Manitou Lake Regional Park. A brochure was published, promising a park with picnic grounds, camp kitchens, playgrounds, a tennis court, a 9-hole golf course and a mile long sandy beach – with free indoor showers to wash off the salt.

Saskatchewan Society for Crippled Children (Camp Easter Seal) was established and began operating the facility as a summer camp for individuals experiencing disability.

=== Current operation ===
Camp Easter Seal is now operated by SaskAbilities and in its 65+ years of operation, has been Saskatchewan's only fully barrier-free camp.

== Tourism ==
=== Attractions ===
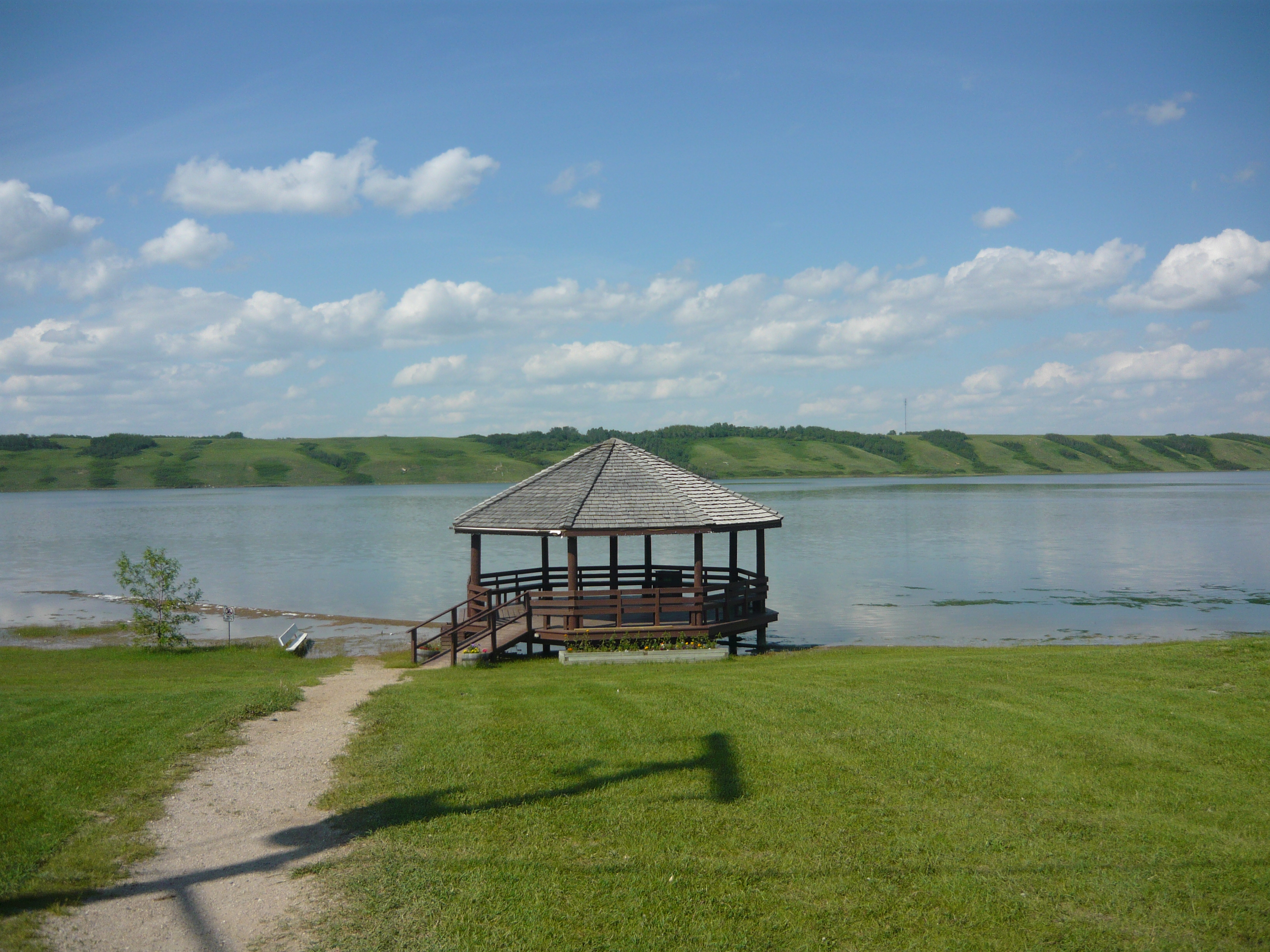
Gazebo

Manitou Beach is a tourist destination. It features mineral spa, a dance hall, a nine-hole golf course, numerous art galleries, and a regional park and campground.

==== Saltwaters ====
The waters at the beach are known for their high salinity and resulting buoyancy. Because the lake water has a specific gravity 10 per cent higher than regular water, persons who enter the lake naturally float on top. It is one of only three bodies of water in the world with such properties, the other two being the Dead Sea in Israel and Karlovy Vary in the Czech Republic.

==== Jubilee Drive-In Theatre ====
The Jubilee Drive-In theatre in Manitou Beach is one of the few left in Saskatchewan. The theatre continues to operate since its inception in 1955. The others include the Prairie Dog Drive-in Theatre in Carlyle, the Clearwater Drive-In in Kyle, the Moonlight Movies Drive-in in Pilot Butte, and the Twilite Drive-In Theater in Wolseley.

==== Danceland ====
Danceland, known as the "Home of the World Famous Dance Floor Built on Horsehair" was built in 1928 and continues to be used as a popular year-round venue for performances, weddings and more. The building remains open during the day for tourists to view the architecture and 5,000 square foot dance floor, famously springy due to underlayment of horsehair. Danceland offers square and pattern dancing on weekend, as well as Toonie Tuesday's.

In 1928 Wellington White built "Danceland" pavilion on the east beach. It replaced an earlier Danceland built before 1919. There are two floors, a sub floor and a hardwood floor. Between the two floors is a layer of horsehair (bought from local farmers and imported from Quebec) six to ten inches thick. No nails were used to construct the floor. The unique construction of the floor gives it a flexibility (spring) which makes it easy to dance on. You actually feel the movement of the floor as couples dance.

Jitney dances were popular in the 1920s. ("Jitney" means a nickel.) Danceland would get 500 people in attendance. The hall was open every night, including a “midnight frolic” on Sunday. Admission was 10 cents a dance or 3 for a quarter.

"Art Harmony 7" band (Guy Watkins, a blind musician) used to broadcast concerts over CFQC Radio. Later Ken Peaker, Mart Kenny and his western gentlemen, Don Messer, Wilf Carter, Sammy Kaye, Bobby Gimby, The Inkspots, Gene Dloughy, Norma Locke, and The Silver Tone played there.

=== Events ===
==== Spirit of Manitou Annual Studio Trail ====
The annual Spirit of Manitou Trail is a self-guided art show that feature artists and artisans from the communities of Guernsey, Meacham, Plunkett, Viscount, Watrous and Manitou Beach. The Studio Trail generally takes place the second weekend in July.

The Studio Trail consists of local artists and artisans who have come together to present their works. As with all things Saskatchewan, there are distances to travel and that makes for part of the allure of exploring these studios. Trail participants have chosen to showcase their talents either at their work studio or have banded together in a central location. Participants offer demonstrations, restrooms and wheelchair accessibility. Jump on the trail anywhere you wish, and follow the brochure's map to find the next artisan or artist.

==== Manitou Beach Chainsaw Carving Festival ====
Manitou Beach hosts Saskatchewan's only professional chainsaw carving festival every second year. The four-day event often takes place the second weekend of August, starting on the Thursday. The event hosts food and craft vendors, a children's area, live demonstrations, and carving auctions.

== Government ==
The Resort Village of Manitou Beach is governed by an elected municipal council and an appointed administrator that meets on alternating Mondays. The mayor is Pauline (Poppy) Petersen and its administrator is Elise Dale.

== See also ==
- List of communities in Saskatchewan
- List of resort villages in Saskatchewan
- List of villages in Saskatchewan
- List of summer villages in Alberta
- List of place names in Canada of Indigenous origin
