= Zelma, Saskatchewan =

Village in Saskatchewan, Canada

Village of Zelma
- Village
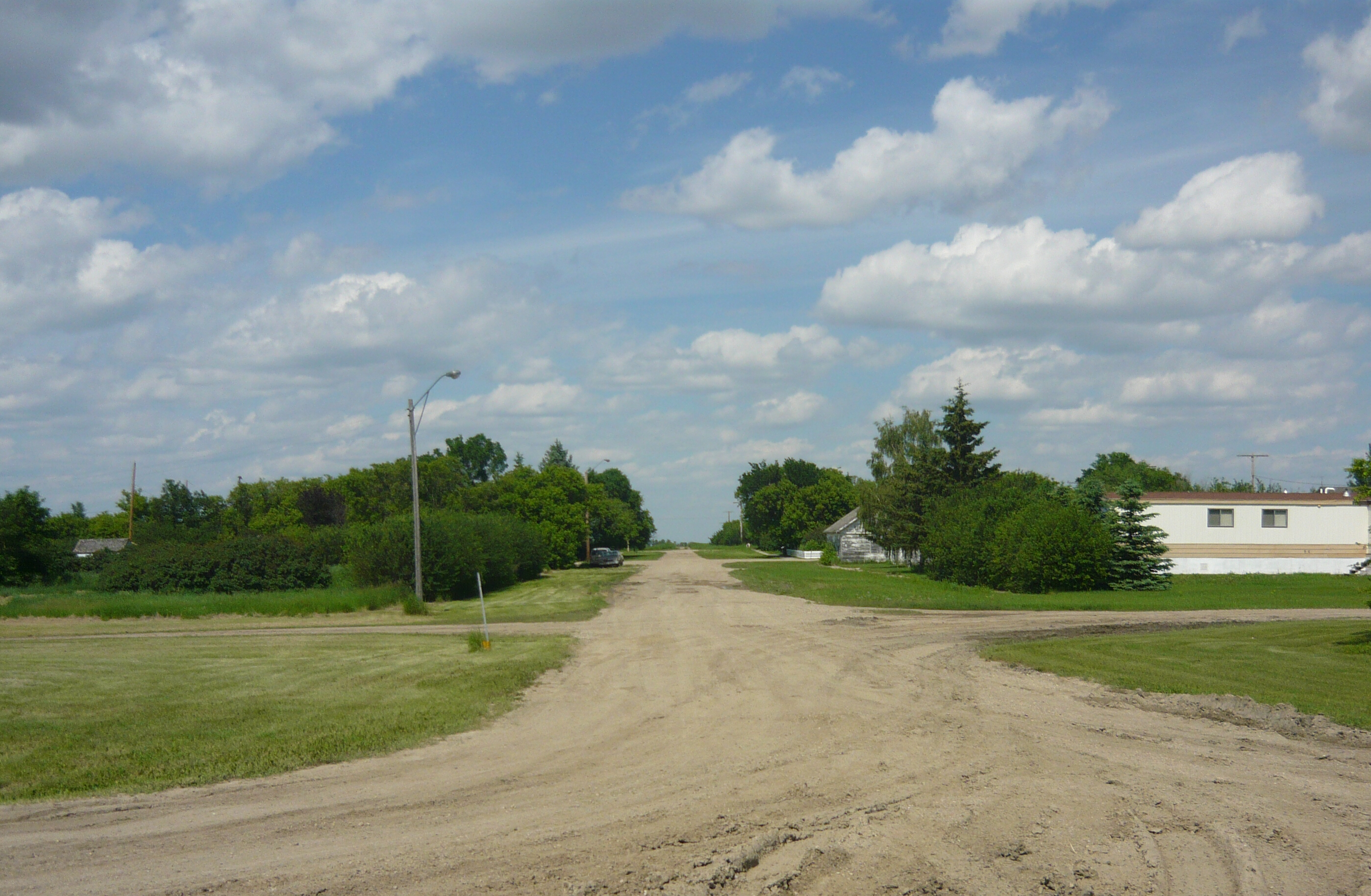
- Main Street

- Location of Zelma in Saskatchewan Village of Zelma (Canada)
- Coordinates: 51.841694°N 105.91121°W
- Country: Canada
- Province: Saskatchewan
- Census division: No. 11
- Rural Municipality: Morris No. 312
- Post office Founded: 1909 (closed 1985)
- Incorporated (Village): August 10, 1910

Government
  - Mayor: R. Glen Crockett

Area
  - Total: 0.72 km^{2} (0.28 sq mi)

Population (2006)
  - Total: 30
  - Density: 41.9/km^{2} (109/sq mi)
- Time zone: CST
- Postal code: S0K 0C0
- Area code: 306

Zelma (2016 population: 35) is a village in the Canadian province of Saskatchewan within the Rural Municipality of Morris No. 312 and Census Division No. 11. The village is located along Saskatchewan Highway 763.

== History ==
Zelma incorporated as a village on August 10, 1910.

The Zelma Church was built in 1909 with a load of lumber for $500 and volunteer labour. Initially a Presbyterian Church, it was reorganised in 1917 as the Zelma United Church.

Until 1912, students were required to attend school in the neighbouring communities of Stonemount or Golden Wheat due to reluctance of many of the farmers (who were bachelors) in the area to vote in favour of spending tax money on a school. In 1912 the school district was established, originally using the church for classes until a one-room school house was constructed in 1925. The school closed in 1969, with students bussed to Young.

During the early years following the establishment of Zelma, the village had a thriving business community with a general store, lumber yards, a hotel, bakery, flour mill, and grain elevators; most of these business had disappeared by the end of the 1940s.

== Demographics ==
Population history (1981–2016)
Year	Pop.	±%
1981	62	—
1986	73	+17.7%
1991	69	−5.5%
1996	43	−37.7%
2001	40	−7.0%
2006	30	−25.0%
2011	35	+16.7%
2016	35	+0.0%
Source: Statistics Canada via Saskatchewan Bureau of Statistics

In the 2021 Census of Population conducted by Statistics Canada, Zelma had a population of 28 living in 10 of its 12 total private dwellings, a change of −20% from its 2016 population of 35. With a land area of 0.71 km^{2} (0.27 sq mi), it had a population density of 39.4/km^{2} (102.1/sq mi) in 2021.

In the 2016 Census of Population, the Village of Zelma recorded a population of 35 living in 14 of its 15 total private dwellings, a 0% change from its 2011 population of 35. With a land area of 0.72 km^{2} (0.28 sq mi), it had a population density of 48.6/km^{2} (125.9/sq mi) in 2016.

== See also ==
- List of communities in Saskatchewan
- List of villages in Saskatchewan
