= Plunkett, Saskatchewan =

Community in Saskatchewan, Canada

Plunkett
- Special service area
- Location within Saskatchewan Location within Canada
- Coordinates: 51.906°N 105.445°W
- Country: Canada
- Province: Saskatchewan
- Region: Saskatchewan
- Census division: 11
- Rural municipality (RM): Viscount No. 341
- Post office: 1909
- Incorporated (village): December 28, 1921
- Dissolved: April 1, 2022

Area
  - Land: 0.67 km^{2} (0.26 sq mi)

Population (2021)
  - Total: 60
- Time zone: CST
- Postal code: S0K 3J0
- Area code: 306
- Highways: Highway 16; Highway 365
- Waterways: Little Manitou Lake

Plunkett (2021 population: 60) is a special service area in the Canadian province of Saskatchewan within the Rural Municipality of Viscount No. 341 and Census Division No. 11. It held village status between 1921 and 2022.

== History ==
Plunkett incorporated as a village on December 28, 1921. It was named after Viscount Horace Plunkett, a Canadian Pacific Railway investor. It restructured on April 1, 2022, relinquishing its village status in favour of becoming a special service area under the jurisdiction of the RM of Viscount.

== Geography ==
Plunkett is at the intersection of Highway 16 and Highway 365. The village site is bounded by the railway to the south and Highway 16 to the north.

== Demographics ==
Population history (1981–2021)
Year	Pop.	±%
1981	150	—
1986	130	−13.3%
1991	118	−9.2%
1996	85	−28.0%
2001	75	−11.8%
2006	75	+0.0%
2011	75	+0.0%
2016	60	−20.0%
2021	60	+0.0%
Source: Statistics Canada via Saskatchewan Bureau of Statistics

In the 2021 Census of Population conducted by Statistics Canada, Plunkett had a population of 60 living in 28 of its 36 total private dwellings, a change of 0% from its 2016 population of 60. With a land area of 0.67 km^{2} (0.26 sq mi), it had a population density of 89.6/km^{2} (231.9/sq mi) in 2021.

In the 2016 Census of Population, Plunkett had a population of 60 living in 33 of its 36 total private dwellings, a −25% change from its 2011 population of 75. With a land area of 0.64 km^{2} (0.25 sq mi), it had a population density of 93.8/km^{2} (242.8/sq mi) in 2016.

== Economy ==
The economy of Plunkett includes agriculture and mining, with mines located at Lanigan, Colonsay, and Allan.

== See also ==
- List of communities in Saskatchewan
