= Little Manitou Lake =

Salt lake in Saskatchewan, Canada

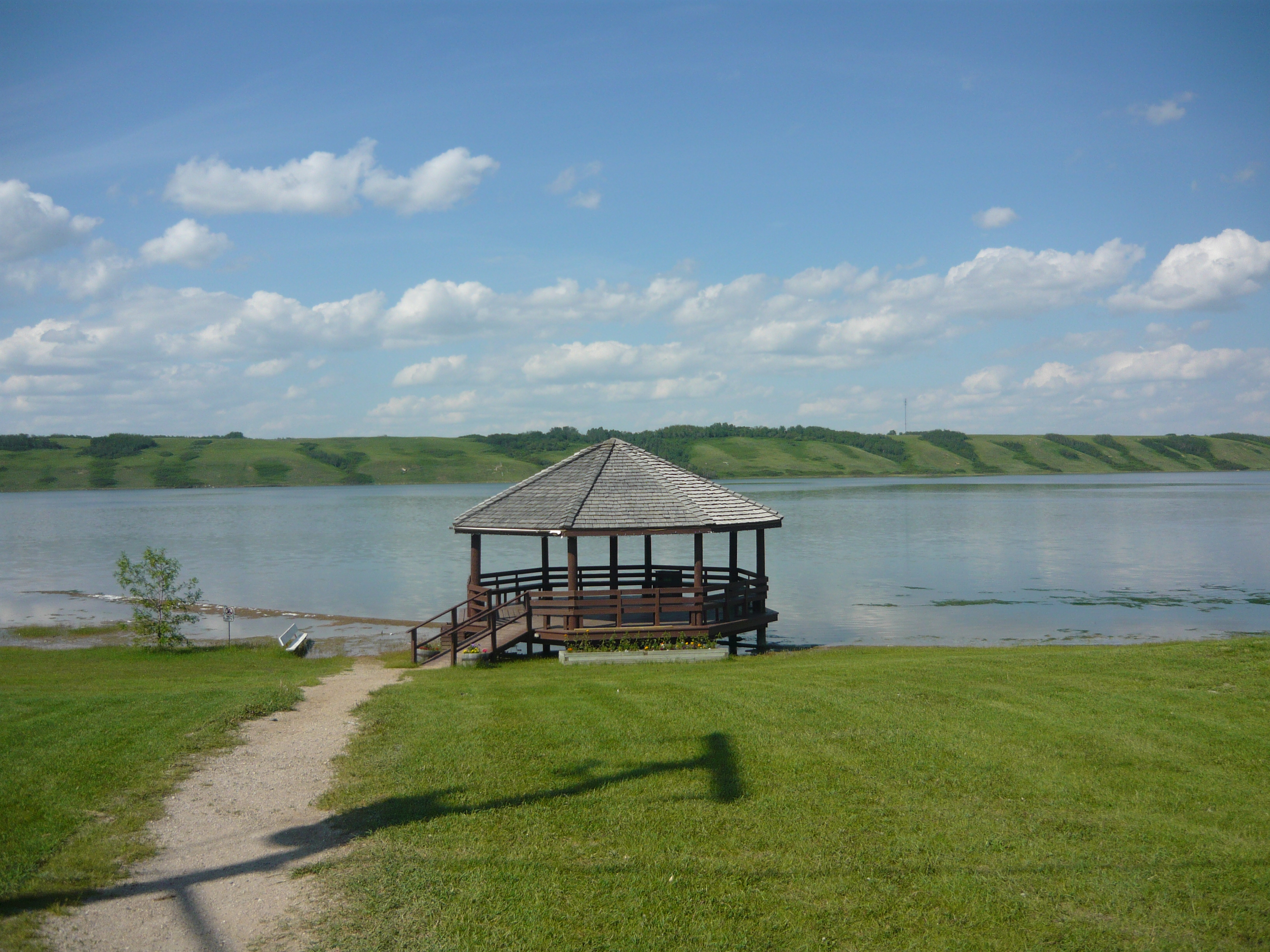
- Manitou Beach

- Location in Saskatchewan Little Manitou Lake (Canada)
- Location: Saskatchewan
- Coordinates: 51.7381°N 105.527°W
- Type: Endorheic lake
- Part of: Qu'Appelle River drainage basin
- Primary outflows: None
- Basin countries: Canada
- Max. length: 22.5 km (14.0 mi)
- Max. width: 1.6 km (1 mi)
- Surface area: 1,524 ha (3,770 acres)
- Average depth: 3.8 m (12 ft)
- Shore length^{1}: 43.3 km (26.9 mi)
- Surface elevation: 495 m (1,624 ft)
- Settlements: Manitou Beach
- ^{1} Shore length is not a well-defined measure.

Little Manitou Lake, nicknamed the "Dead Sea of Canada", is a terminal salt lake in the Canadian province of Saskatchewan. Manitou is Algonquin for "mysterious being" or "spirit". The lake is about 120 kilometres (75 mi) south-east of Saskatoon and 5 kilometres (3.1 mi) north of Watrous. The lake sits in a glacial spillway that formed by receding glaciers at the end of the most recent ice age and is fed by underground springs. It has a mineral content high in sodium, magnesium, and potassium salts due to it being a terminal lake. Little Manitou Lake is about half as salty as the Dead Sea and five times saltier than the ocean.

The southern shore of Little Manitou Lake borders the RM of Morris No. 312 while the northern shore borders the RM of Viscount No. 341. The resort community of Manitou Beach is on the southern shore. Access to the lake and its amenities is from Highway 365. In the 2000s, lake waters began to rise due to increased precipitation in the region. Berms and dykes were built around the community of Manitou Beach to protect it. Lake levels peaked around 2016.

There are no fish in the lake as the high salt content of the water supports little other than brine shrimp.

== History ==
Since the 19th century, native people have been bringing sick people to the lake they named after the spirit Manitou. The earliest known practice of using this water to heal was when some Assiniboine people afflicted with smallpox were supposedly cured after drinking and submerging themselves in the water.

Since the turn of the 20th century and the depression of the 1930s, Manitou has been a tourist resort due to its unique mineral waters. Since the late 1980s, the claimed health benefits and the buoyancy of the water have once again made it a popular tourist destination.

Manitou Beach has spawned an arts community, made evident by the founding of an Artists' Collective called "Spirit of Manitou Studio Trail". The Spirit of Manitou Studio Trail consists of an open studio / gallery weekend tour including artists/artisans from the localities of Allan, Meacham, Watrous, and Manitou Beach.

== Description ==
Little Manitou Lake is an endorheic lake that falls within the Lanigan-Manitou Sub-basin of the Upper Qu'Appelle watershed. The lake and the glacial spillway it sits in were formed over 10,000 years ago at the end of the last ice age. It is 22.5 kilometres (14.0 mi) long, 1.6 kilometres (1 mi) wide, and covers an area of 1,524 hectares (3,770 acres). Little Manitou Lake used to be much deeper than its current average depth of 3.8 metres (12 ft). About 1,000 years ago, its water levels lowered significantly causing it became endorheic and salty. The lake would have to rise 6 metres (20 ft) above current levels to naturally spill over into the Lanigan Creek watershed.

The salt content of the water (180 g/L) gives it a salinity about half of that of the Dead Sea (300-400 ppt) and five times that of the ocean, allowing bathers to float easily. It has a specific gravity of 1.06. Little Manitou Lake "is one of only 5 lakes in the world (2 others are also in Saskatchewan) where dissolved salt precipitates in deep water. This occurs when the water is calm for an extended period of time; the salinity near the lake's bottom increases to the point where the water can no longer hold any more salt in the dissolved state."

== Water levels ==
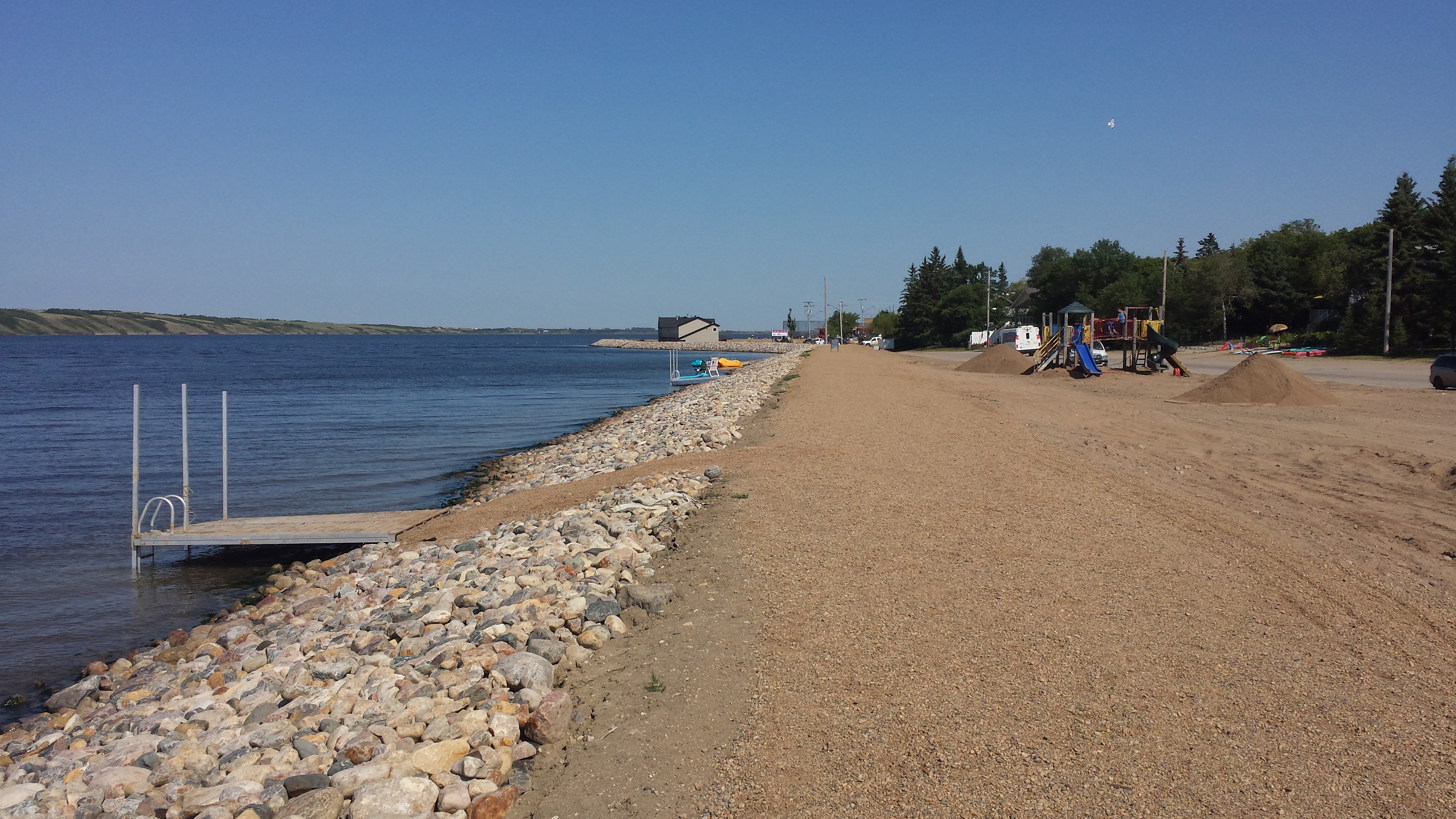
Berm at Little Manitou Lake in 2017

Through the 2000s and 2010s, water levels at Little Manitou Lake had risen to unprecedented heights above the normal level of about 495 metres (1,624 ft) above sea level. Since 2007, rising lake levels have been breaking water level records. In response, a berm was constructed in 2011 to protect the community of Manitou Beach, properties, and other amenities at the lake. In 2016, the lake reached a peak of 497.5 metres (1,632 ft) above sea level — roughly 2.5 metres (8 ft 2 in) above normal levels. By comparison, in 1965, the lake sat at 491 metres (1,611 ft). In 2017, the province added a one-metre height extension at a cost of $3.9 million to 2.5 kilometres (1.6 mi) of existing dykes at the lake. "Since 2011, the province has spent roughly $7 million on flood protection".

Former mayor Gerald Worobec had advocated for a diversion of Wellington Creek to help reduce water flowing into the lake. His plan was to divert Wellington Creek, which flows into the lake at Manitou Beach, to the east and into nearby Boulder Lake. Boulder Lake is a lake along the course of Lanigan Creek. Lanigan Creek is a tributary of Last Mountain Lake in the Qu'Appelle River system. Manitou Beach did not have the resources for such a project.

== Manitou and District Regional Park ==
Manitou & District Regional Park (51.7157°N 105.4514°W) is located 8 kilometres (5.0 mi) north of Watrous on Highway 365. The park is split up into three different areas near the lake. At the lake itself, there is the beach, 500 metres (1,600 ft) south along Highway 365 on the west side is Manitou Beach Golf Club, and across from the golf course on the east side of the highway is the campground. Right beside the campground is the Jubilee Drive-In Theatre, one of only a few left in Saskatchewan.

In 1931, one of the founding six original provincial parks was founded at the lake. It was called "Little Manitou Provincial Park". In 1962, it was changed to a regional park. The founding of the original provincial parks was a plan by the government to get people working during the Great Depression. Several buildings were built, including a natural fieldstone chalet, which was used as a commercial tourist hotel. In the 1950s, the chalet was changed to Camp Easter Seal.

== See also ==
- List of lakes of Saskatchewan
- Tourism in Saskatchewan
- List of protected areas of Saskatchewan
- Big Manitou Regional Park
