= Rural Municipality of Morris No. 312 =

Rural municipality in Saskatchewan, Canada

Morris No. 312
- Rural municipality
- Rural Municipality of Morris No. 312

- Location of the RM of Morris No. 312 in Saskatchewan
- Coordinates: 51.725°N 105.557°W
- Country: Canada
- Province: Saskatchewan
- Census division: 11
- SARM division: 5
- Federal riding: Moose Jaw—Lake Centre—Lanigan
- Provincial riding: Humboldt-Watrous
- Formed: December 13, 1909

Government
  - Reeve: Keith Thoner
  - Governing body: RM of Morris No. 312 Council
  - Administrator: Belinda Rowan
  - Office location: Young

Area (2016)
  - Land: 847.16 km^{2} (327.09 sq mi)

Population (2016)
  - Total: 290
  - Density: 0.3/km^{2} (0.78/sq mi)
- Time zone: CST
  - Summer (DST): CST
- Postal code: S0K 4Y0
- Area codes: 306 and 639
- Website: Official website

The Rural Municipality of Morris No. 312 (2016 population: 290) is a rural municipality (RM) in the Canadian province of Saskatchewan within Census Division No. 11 and SARM Division No. 5.

== History ==
The RM of Morris No. 312 incorporated as a rural municipality on December 13, 1909.

== Geography ==
Notable geographical features in the RM include Little Manitou Lake, Zelma Reservoir, and the Allan Hills.

=== Communities and localities ===
The following urban municipalities are surrounded by the RM.

Towns

- Watrous

Villages

- Young
- Zelma

Resort villages

- Manitou Beach

The following unincorporated communities are within the RM.

Localities

- Ancram
- Plassey
- Renown
- Xena

== Demographics ==
Population history (1981–2016)
Year	Pop.	±%
1981	593	—
1986	568	−4.2%
1991	494	−13.0%
1996	448	−9.3%
2001	410	−8.5%
2006	347	−15.4%
2011	316	−8.9%
2016	290	−8.2%
Source: Statistics Canada via Saskatchewan Bureau of Statistics

In the 2021 Census of Population conducted by Statistics Canada, the RM of Morris No. 312 had a population of 263 living in 109 of its 131 total private dwellings, a change of −9.3% from its 2016 population of 290. With a land area of 842.62 km^{2} (325.34 sq mi), it had a population density of 0.3/km^{2} (0.8/sq mi) in 2021.

In the 2016 Census of Population, the RM of Morris No. 312 recorded a population of 290 living in 119 of its 140 total private dwellings, a −8.2% change from its 2011 population of 316. With a land area of 847.16 km^{2} (327.09 sq mi), it had a population density of 0.3/km^{2} (0.9/sq mi) in 2016.

== Government ==
The RM of Morris No. 312 is governed by an elected municipal council and an appointed administrator that meets on the second Tuesday of every month. The reeve of the RM is Keith Thoner while its administrator is Belinda Rowan. The RM's office is located in Young.

== See also ==
- List of rural municipalities in Saskatchewan
