= Viscount, Saskatchewan =

Village in Saskatchewan, Canada

Viscount
- Village
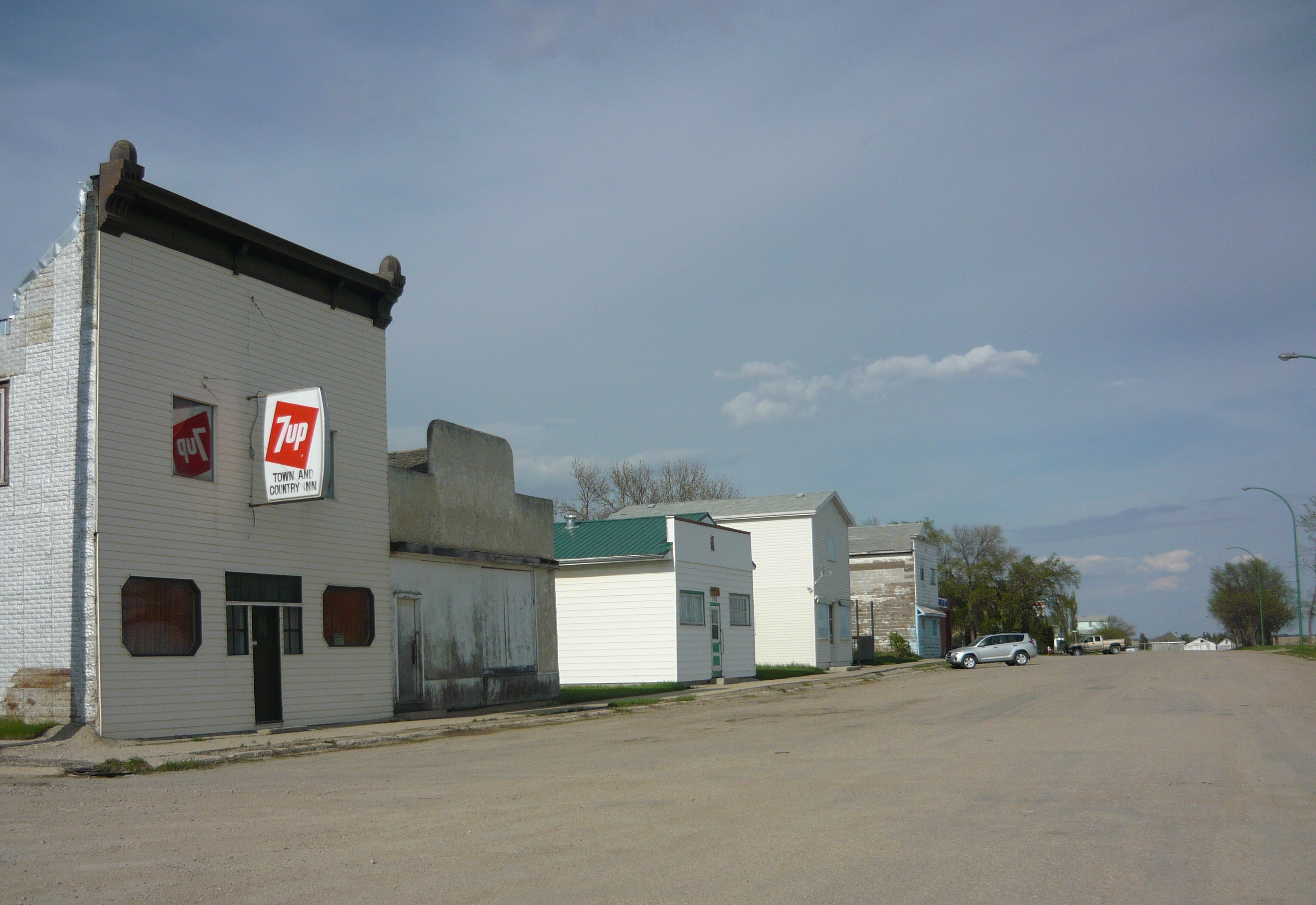
- Amherst Avenue
- Motto: "A warm welcoming community"
- Location within Saskatchewan Location within Canada
- Coordinates: 51°56′43″N 105°38′48″W
- Country: Canada
- Province: Saskatchewan
- Rural municipality: Viscount No. 341
- Village established: December 17, 1908

Government
  - Mayor: Melissa Dieno

Area
  - Total: 1.18 km^{2} (0.46 sq mi)
- Elevation: 548 m (1,798 ft)

Population (2011)
  - Total: 252
  - Density: 212.7/km^{2} (551/sq mi)
  - Summer (DST): UTC-6 (CST)
- Postal code: S0K 4M0
- Area code: 306
- Website: Official website

Viscount is a village in the Canadian province of Saskatchewan within the Rural Municipality of Viscount No. 341 and Census Division No. 11. Viscount is located on Highway 16, the Yellowhead Highway, in central Saskatchewan east of Colonsay and west of Lanigan. As of the Canada 2016 Census, Viscount had a population of 232.

Viscount post office first opened in 1908 in the Dominion Land Survey Sec.29, Twp.34, R.26, W2.

== History ==
Viscount incorporated as a village on December 17, 1908.

== Demographics ==
Population history (1981–2016)
Year	Pop.	±%
1981	386	—
1986	364	−5.7%
1991	299	−17.9%
1996	295	−1.3%
2001	272	−7.8%
2006	251	−7.7%
2011	252	+0.4%
2016	232	−7.9%
Source: Statistics Canada via Saskatchewan Bureau of Statistics

In the 2021 Census of Population conducted by Statistics Canada, Viscount had a population of 282 living in 128 of its 149 total private dwellings, a change of 21.6% from its 2016 population of 232. With a land area of 1.49 km^{2} (0.58 sq mi), it had a population density of 189.3/km^{2} (490.2/sq mi) in 2021.

In the 2016 Census of Population, the Village of Viscount recorded a population of 232 living in 104 of its 137 total private dwellings, a −8.6% change from its 2011 population of 252. With a land area of 1.18 km^{2} (0.46 sq mi), it had a population density of 196.6/km^{2} (509.2/sq mi) in 2016.

== Climate ==
Climate data for Viscount
Month	Jan	Feb	Mar	Apr	May	Jun	Jul	Aug	Sep	Oct	Nov	Dec	Year
Record high °C (°F)	6.5 (43.7)	9.5 (49.1)	19.5 (67.1)	30.0 (86.0)	37.0 (98.6)	40.5 (104.9)	37.5 (99.5)	36.5 (97.7)	33.0 (91.4)	28.5 (83.3)	18.9 (66.0)	8.5 (47.3)	40.5 (104.9)
Mean daily maximum °C (°F)	−11.7 (10.9)	−8.3 (17.1)	−0.7 (30.7)	10.6 (51.1)	18.6 (65.5)	22.8 (73.0)	24.9 (76.8)	24.2 (75.6)	17.8 (64.0)	10.2 (50.4)	−2.3 (27.9)	−9.9 (14.2)	8.0 (46.4)
Daily mean °C (°F)	−16.8 (1.8)	−13.3 (8.1)	−5.6 (21.9)	4.4 (39.9)	11.6 (52.9)	16.1 (61.0)	18.1 (64.6)	17.1 (62.8)	11.2 (52.2)	4.2 (39.6)	−6.7 (19.9)	−14.7 (5.5)	2.1 (35.8)
Mean daily minimum °C (°F)	−21.8 (−7.2)	−18.2 (−0.8)	−10.5 (13.1)	−1.9 (28.6)	4.5 (40.1)	9.4 (48.9)	11.3 (52.3)	9.9 (49.8)	4.6 (40.3)	−1.8 (28.8)	−11.1 (12.0)	−19.4 (−2.9)	−3.8 (25.2)
Record low °C (°F)	−40.5 (−40.9)	−41.5 (−42.7)	−35.0 (−31.0)	−26.7 (−16.1)	−10.0 (14.0)	−1.0 (30.2)	3.5 (38.3)	−3.0 (26.6)	−8.0 (17.6)	−23.5 (−10.3)	−35.0 (−31.0)	−42.0 (−43.6)	−42.0 (−43.6)
Average precipitation mm (inches)	16.7 (0.66)	12.2 (0.48)	20.3 (0.80)	26.5 (1.04)	54.6 (2.15)	71.1 (2.80)	61.5 (2.42)	51.2 (2.02)	38.8 (1.53)	23.8 (0.94)	14.3 (0.56)	20.7 (0.81)	411.6 (16.20)
Source: Environment Canada

== See also ==
- List of communities in Saskatchewan
- List of villages in Saskatchewan
