= Rural Municipality of Viscount No. 341 =

Rural municipality in Saskatchewan, Canada

Viscount No. 341
- Rural municipality
- Rural Municipality of Viscount No. 341
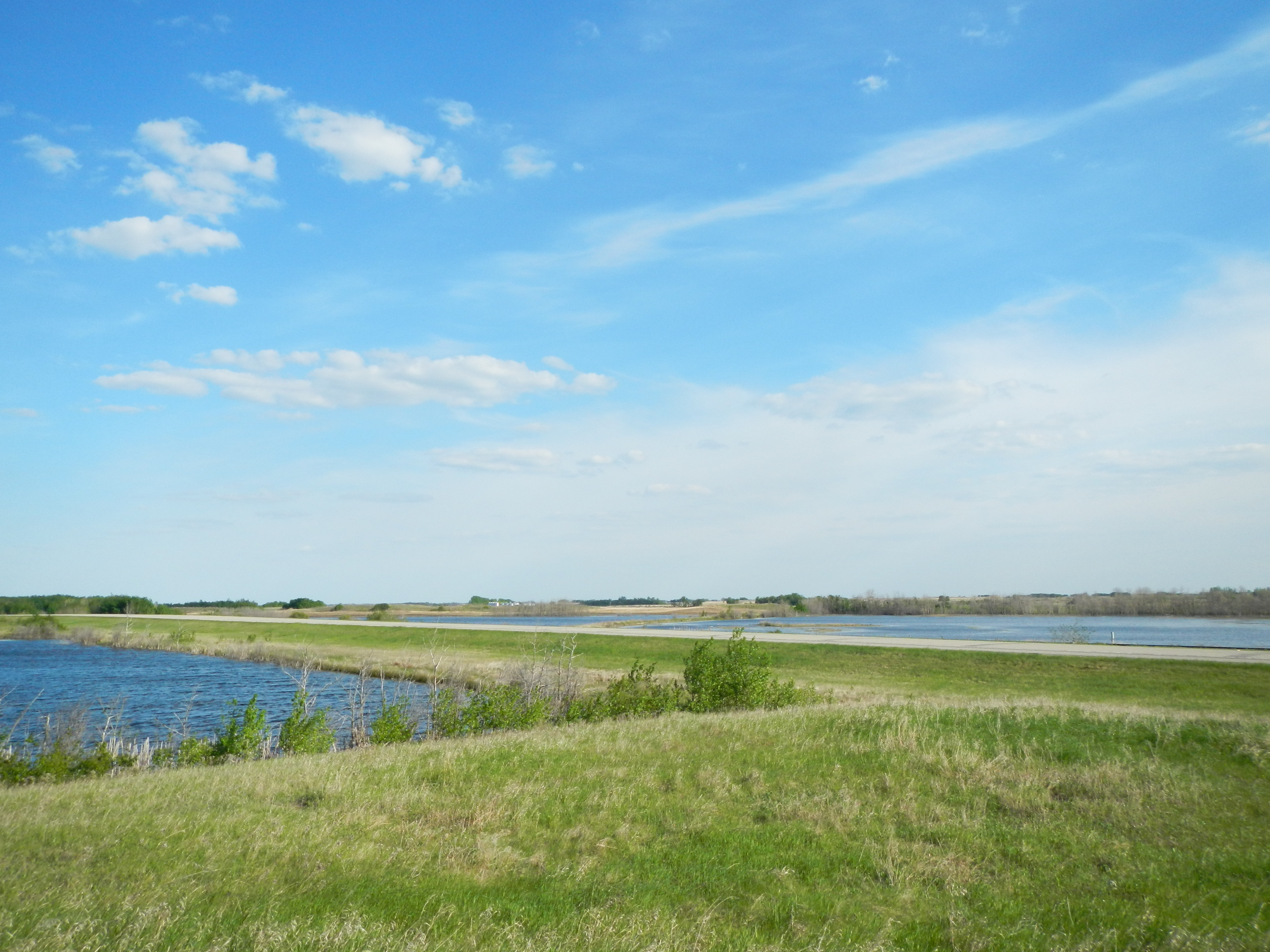
- Prairie landscape in the RM

- Location of the RM of Viscount No. 341 in Saskatchewan
- Coordinates: 51.809°N 105.513°W
- Country: Canada
- Province: Saskatchewan
- Census division: 11
- SARM division: 5
- Formed: December 13, 1909

Government
  - Reeve: Gordon Gusikoski
  - Governing body: RM of Viscount No. 341 Council
  - Administrator: Joni Mack
  - Office location: Viscount

Area (2016)
  - Land: 831.23 km^{2} (320.94 sq mi)

Population (2016)
  - Total: 338
  - Density: 0.4/km^{2} (1.0/sq mi)
- Time zone: CST
  - Summer (DST): CST
- Area codes: 306 and 639

The Rural Municipality of Viscount No. 341 (2016 population: 338) is a rural municipality (RM) in the Canadian province of Saskatchewan within Census Division No. 11 and SARM Division No. 5. It is located in the central portion of the province.

== History ==
The RM of Viscount No. 341 incorporated as a rural municipality on December 13, 1909.

== Geography ==
=== Communities and localities ===
The following urban municipalities are surrounded by the RM.

Villages

- Plunkett
- Viscount

The following unincorporated communities are within the RM.

Localities

- Sclanders

== Demographics ==
Population history (1981–2016)
Year	Pop.	±%
1981	680	—
1986	626	−7.9%
1991	549	−12.3%
1996	494	−10.0%
2001	434	−12.1%
2006	386	−11.1%
2011	371	−3.9%
2016	338	−8.9%
Source: Statistics Canada via Saskatchewan Bureau of Statistics

In the 2021 Census of Population conducted by Statistics Canada, the RM of Viscount No. 341 had a population of 320 living in 135 of its 145 total private dwellings, a change of −5.3% from its 2016 population of 338. With a land area of 828.55 km^{2} (319.90 sq mi), it had a population density of 0.4/km^{2} (1.0/sq mi) in 2021.

In the 2016 Census of Population, the RM of Viscount No. 341 recorded a population of 338 living in 143 of its 147 total private dwellings, a −8.9% change from its 2011 population of 371. With a land area of 831.23 km^{2} (320.94 sq mi), it had a population density of 0.4/km^{2} (1.1/sq mi) in 2016.

== Government ==
The RM of Viscount No. 341 is governed by an elected municipal council and an appointed administrator that meets on the second Tuesday of every month. The reeve of the RM is Gordon Gusikoski while its administrator is Joni Mack. The RM's office is located in Viscount.

== See also ==
- List of rural municipalities in Saskatchewan
