= Young, Saskatchewan =

Young
- Village
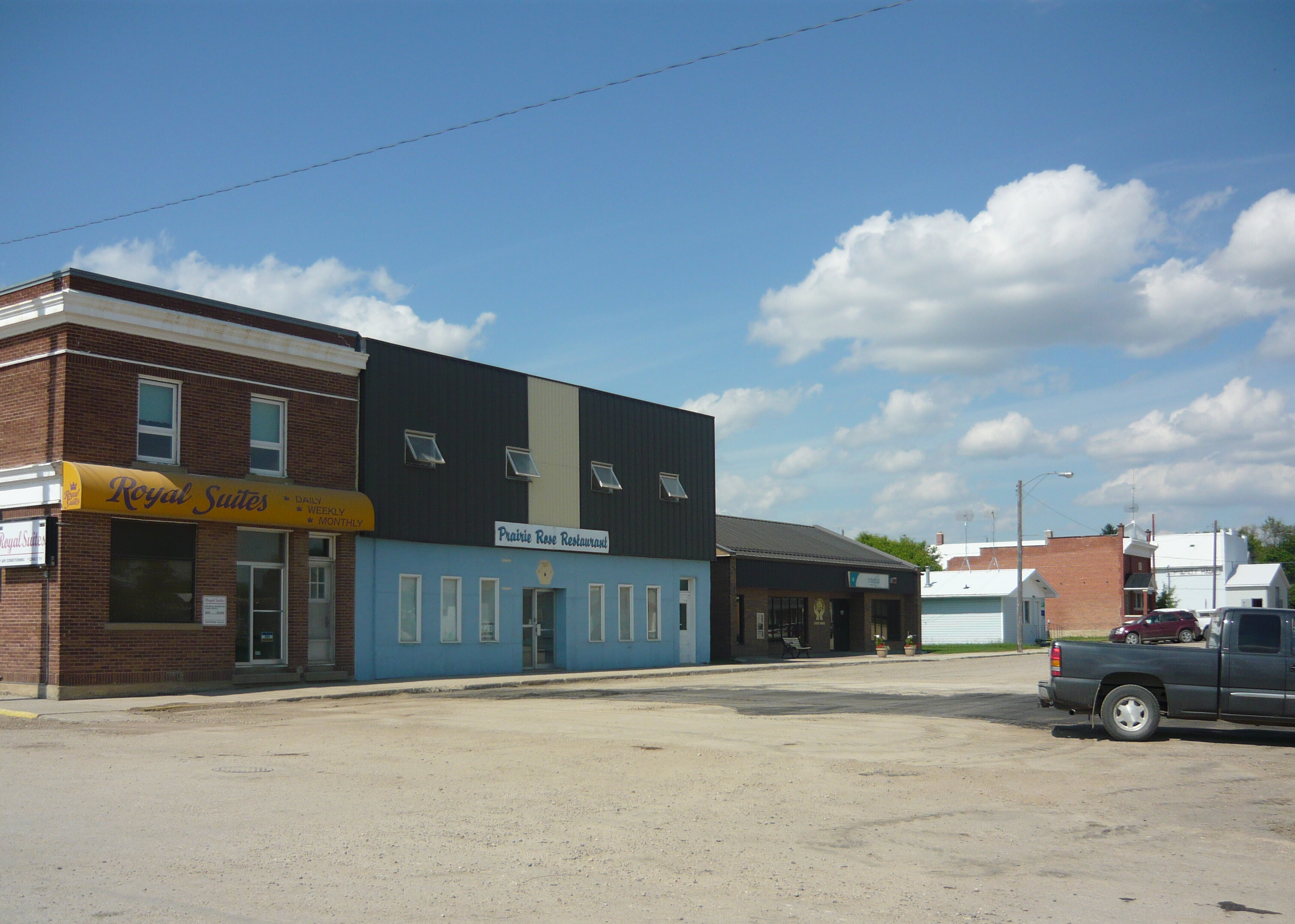
- Main Street

- Location within Morris No. 312 Location within Saskatchewan
- Coordinates: 51.7687°N 105.7482°W
- Country: Canada
- Province: Saskatchewan
- Region: Saskatchewan
- Founded: 1908
- Post Office Established: 1909-04-01
- Village Incorporated: June 7, 1910

Government
  - Mayor: Agnes Thompson
  - Governing body: Young Village Council

Area
  - Land: 2.51 km^{2} (0.97 sq mi)

Population (2011)
  - Total: 239
  - Density: 95.2/km^{2} (247/sq mi)
- Time zone: CST
- Postal code: S0K 4Y0
- Area code: 306
- Highways: Highway 2
- Website: Official Site

Young (2016 population: 244) is a village in the Canadian province of Saskatchewan within the Rural Municipality of Morris No. 312. The economy is dominated by local agriculture and the nearby Mosaic Potash mine.

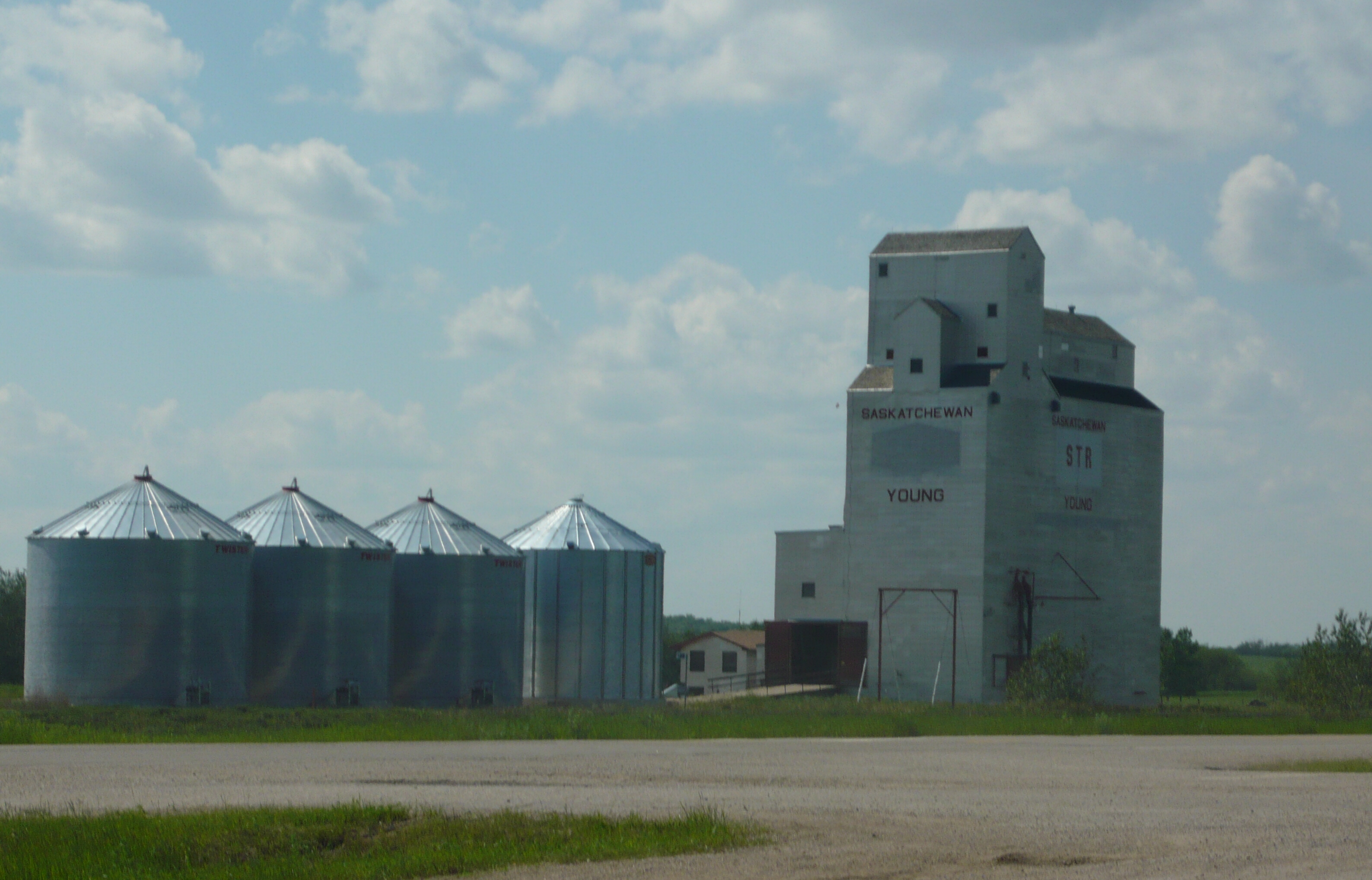

== History ==
Young came into being with the coming of the Grand Trunk Pacific Railway. Young incorporated as a village on June 7, 1910. It was named for F.G. Young, a land agent.

A limestone kiln producing 1000 bushels of lime a day was established in the town at the northwest end of 2 Avenue.

It has a 3 sheet curling rink with artificial ice and hockey arena, a swimming pool, golf course, ball diamonds and playground.

A fire destroyed the village's oldest building, the former Young Hotel, on November 12, 2011. The hotel was built in 1910.

== Demographics ==
Population history (1981–2016)
Year	Pop.	±%
1981	456	—
1986	427	−6.4%
1991	352	−17.6%
1996	320	−9.1%
2001	299	−6.6%
2006	263	−12.0%
2011	239	−9.1%
2016	244	+2.1%
Source: Statistics Canada via Saskatchewan Bureau of Statistics

In the 2021 Census of Population conducted by Statistics Canada, Young had a population of 253 living in 126 of its 142 total private dwellings, a change of 3.7% from its 2016 population of 244. With a land area of 2.54 km^{2} (0.98 sq mi), it had a population density of 99.6/km^{2} (258.0/sq mi) in 2021.

In the 2016 Census of Population, the Village of Young recorded a population of 244 living in 117 of its 133 total private dwellings, a 2% change from its 2011 population of 239. With a land area of 2.51 km^{2} (0.97 sq mi), it had a population density of 97.2/km^{2} (251.8/sq mi) in 2016.

== Notable people ==
- Wes George: former WHA player
- Bob Mills: former Member of Parliament for Red Deer
- Roy Atkinson: founding president of the National Farmers Union
- Kory Teneycke: former Director of Communications in the Prime Minister's Office

== See also ==
- List of communities in Saskatchewan
- List of villages in Saskatchewan
