= Watrous, Saskatchewan =

Town in Saskatchewan, Canada

Watrous
- Town
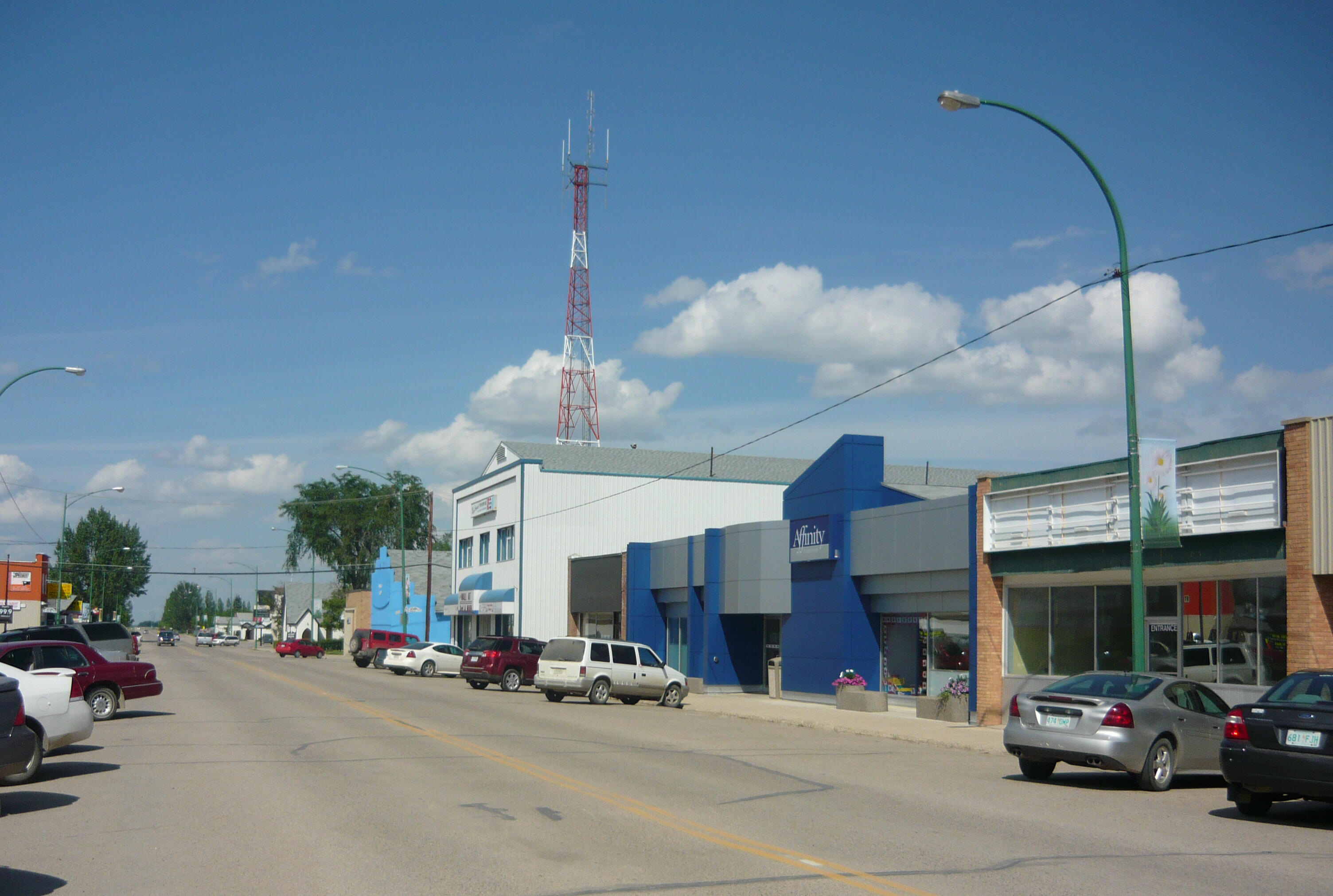
- Main Street

- Location within Morris No. 312 Location within Saskatchewan
- Coordinates: 51°40′40″N 105°27′51″W
- Country: Canada
- Province: Saskatchewan
- Village Incorporated: 15 October 1908
- Town Incorporated: 30 December 1909

Government
  - Mayor: John Gunderson
  - Governing body: Watrous Town Council

Area
  - Land: 11.17 km^{2} (4.31 sq mi)
- Elevation: 536 m (1,759 ft)

Population (2016)
  - Total: 1,865
  - Density: 166.2/km^{2} (430/sq mi)
- Time zone: UTC−6 (CST)
- Postal code: S0K 4T0
- Area code: 306
- Highways: Highway 2
- Website: Official Site

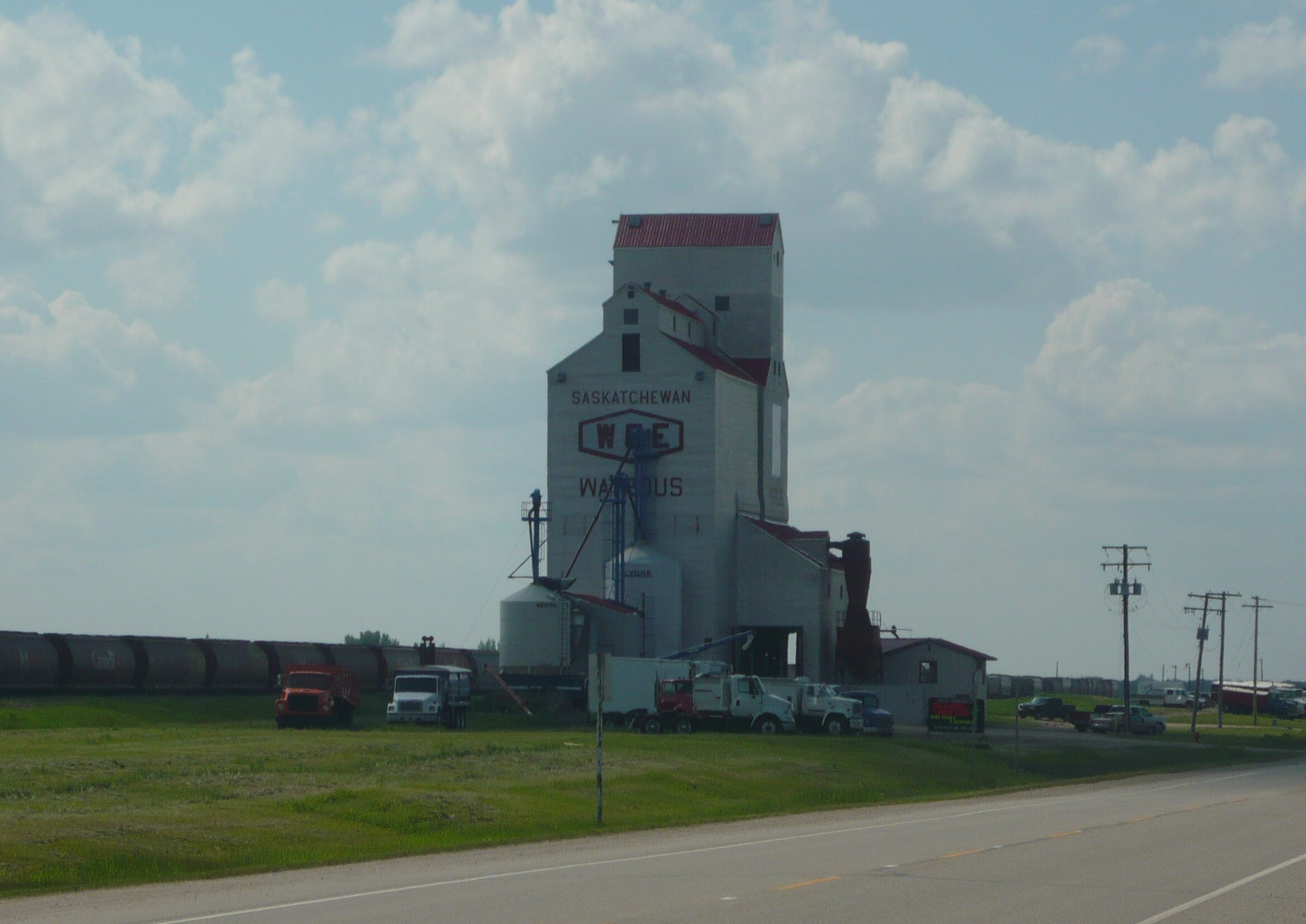
Grain elevator

Watrous /ˈwɑːtrəs/ is a town in the Canadian province of Saskatchewan. It is 106 kilometres (66 mi) east of Saskatoon and has an economy that is based on agriculture and tourism because of its proximity to Manitou Beach, home of the Mineral Spa and Danceland dance Hall (known as the "Home of the World Famous Dance Floor Built on Horsehair"). Watrous was named after Frank Watrous Morse. The town has several restaurants, a hospital, medical clinic, elementary school, high school, community college, bowling alley, RCMP detachment, banks, a grocery store, and motels.

Watrous is notable for being the location of the transmitter of CBK, CBC Radio One's primary station in Saskatchewan. The transmitter was originally located at Watrous in 1939 in order to cover most of the Prairie Provinces with a strong nighttime signal (the station, then as now, is a 50,000-watt clear-channel station). It was also intended to serve most of the province's populated area, including Regina and Saskatoon, from one transmitter. While Watrous is the station's city of licence, its actual studios are located in Regina. The Watrous transmitter is still considered the station's primary signal, even though both of the larger urban areas are now served by separate FM rebroadcasters.

== History ==
The All Saints Anglican church on Main Street has a stained glass window that could be over 500 years old. The window may have come from St John the Baptist Anglican Church, Latton, Wiltshire, England.

== Demographics ==
In the 2021 Census of Population conducted by Statistics Canada, Watrous had a population of 1,842 living in 851 of its 908 total private dwellings, a change of −3.1% from its 2016 population of 1,900. With a land area of 11.29 km^{2} (4.36 sq mi), it had a population density of 163.2/km^{2} (422.6/sq mi) in 2021.

Canada census – Watrous, Saskatchewan community profile

	2011
Population	1,857 (+6.5% from 2006)
Land area	11.17 km^{2} (4.31 sq mi)
Population density	166.2/km^{2} (430/sq mi)
Median age	45.5 (M: 43.6, F: 46.8)
Private dwellings	862 (total)
Median household income

References: 2011

== Transportation ==
The town is serviced by the Watrous Airport and Via Rail's The Canadian serves the town as a flag stop three times per week (in each direction).

Railway services
- Preceding station	Via Rail	Following station
  Saskatoon toward Vancouver	The Canadian	Melville toward Toronto
  Former services
  Preceding station	Via Rail	Following station
  Saskatoon toward Vancouver	Super Continental	Raymore toward Toronto
  Preceding station	Canadian National Railway	Following station
  Xena toward Vancouver	Main Line	Venn toward Montreal
  Xena toward Prince Albert	Prince Albert – Watrous	Terminus

== Sports and recreation ==
The Jubilee Drive-In Theatre in Manitou Beach is open from the Victoria Day weekend until October. It is one of the few drive-ins still operating in Saskatchewan. The others include the Prairie Dog Drive-in in Carlyle, the Clearwater Drive-In in Kyle, the Moonlight Movies Drive-in in Pilot Butte, and the Twilite Drive-In Theater in Wolseley.

The Watrous Winterhawks of the Long Lake Hockey League play at the Watrous Centennial Arena. Watrous also has a curling rink, bowling, golfing, swimming, ball diamonds, and a soccer pitch.

== Climate ==
Watrous has a humid continental climate (Dfb on climate maps). It has very cold winters that give way to warm summers. The average daily mean temperature is 2.3°C while the record low is -43°C and the record high is 39.5°C.

Climate data for Watrous
Month	Jan	Feb	Mar	Apr	May	Jun	Jul	Aug	Sep	Oct	Nov	Dec	Year
Record high °C (°F)	7.2 (45.0)	9 (48)	20 (68)	30.5 (86.9)	37 (99)	39.5 (103.1)	37.5 (99.5)	38.9 (102.0)	36.1 (97.0)	31.1 (88.0)	22.2 (72.0)	14.5 (58.1)	39.5 (103.1)
Mean daily maximum °C (°F)	−11.7 (10.9)	−7.6 (18.3)	−0.8 (30.6)	10.2 (50.4)	18.2 (64.8)	22.4 (72.3)	24.8 (76.6)	24.4 (75.9)	17.9 (64.2)	10.5 (50.9)	−1.5 (29.3)	−9.2 (15.4)	8.1 (46.6)
Daily mean °C (°F)	−16.8 (1.8)	−12.5 (9.5)	−5.8 (21.6)	4 (39)	11.3 (52.3)	15.9 (60.6)	18.1 (64.6)	17.3 (63.1)	11.3 (52.3)	4.5 (40.1)	−6 (21)	−13.9 (7.0)	2.3 (36.1)
Mean daily minimum °C (°F)	−21.8 (−7.2)	−17.3 (0.9)	−10.8 (12.6)	−2.2 (28.0)	4.4 (39.9)	9.4 (48.9)	11.4 (52.5)	10.1 (50.2)	4.7 (40.5)	−1.5 (29.3)	−10.4 (13.3)	−18.6 (−1.5)	−3.6 (25.5)
Record low °C (°F)	−43 (−45)	−41.5 (−42.7)	−40.6 (−41.1)	−28.3 (−18.9)	−11.1 (12.0)	−3.3 (26.1)	1.7 (35.1)	−1.5 (29.3)	−16.1 (3.0)	−22.2 (−8.0)	−34 (−29)	−41 (−42)	−43 (−45)
Average precipitation mm (inches)	17.5 (0.69)	10.9 (0.43)	17.1 (0.67)	30.3 (1.19)	53.5 (2.11)	83.9 (3.30)	66.1 (2.60)	53 (2.1)	42.6 (1.68)	28 (1.1)	13 (0.5)	18.6 (0.73)	434.5 (17.11)
Source: Environment Canada

== See also ==
- List of towns in Saskatchewan
- List of communities in Saskatchewan
