= Statue of José I of Portugal =

Statue of King Joseph I
- Estátua de D. José I (Portuguese)
- Interactive map of Statue of King Joseph I
- 38°42′27.0324″N 9°8′11.2632″W
- Type: Equestrian statue
- Location: Praça do Comércio, Lisbon, Portugal

Site notes
- Sculptor: Joaquim Machado de Castro

The Statue of José I is an equestrian statue of Joseph I of Portugal located in Praça do Comércio in Lisbon. Created by Joaquim Machado de Castro, it was the first equestrian statue made in Portugal, the first public statue in the country dedicated to a living person, and the first of its dimensions to be cast in a single pour in Portugal and one of the first in the world to be so cast.

== History ==
The statue is a result of the reconstruction project of Lisbon after the 1755 earthquake. The design of the new Praça do Comércio (located where the ruined Ribeira Palace square once stood) was the responsibility of the architect Eugénio dos Santos, who planned a monument to King José in the center. The foundation for the statue's pedestal was built immediately; however, upon dos Santos' death in 1760, the commission to execute the statue was given to Joaquim Machado de Castro, who created it based on initial studies by dos Santos.

The casting of the statue was pioneering in Portugal. With the assistance of Brigadier Bartolomeu da Costa, Machado de Castro adapted military casting techniques to the art of sculpture. The casting took place on October 15, 1774, and has the distinction of being one of the first castings of a monumental statue made in a single pour. Few people witnessed the casting, and there was no public event (unlike what occurred during the casting, also in a single jet, of the statue of Louis XV of France, by Edmé Bouchardon, in the Place de la Concorde in Paris) — only those interested, such as Martinho de Melo e Castro, Minister of State, attended the event. The work of retouching the bronze was done in 63 days.

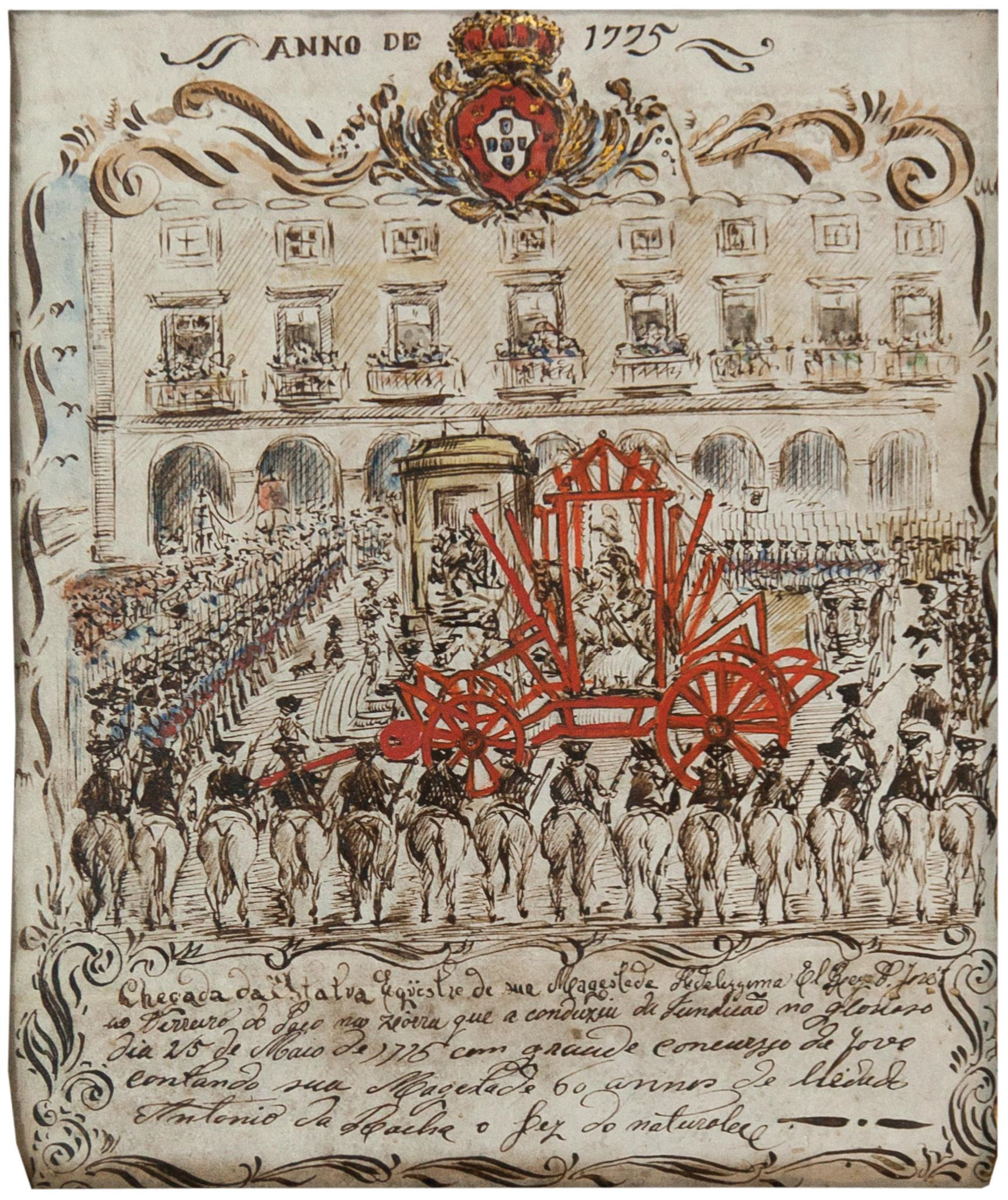
The arrival of the statue of King José I at Praça do Comércio.

On May 15, 1775, King José I, accompanied by his wife Queen Mariana Vitória and some nobles, went to the Foundry House to see the statue. The Queen commented: “The figure’s face is hideous.” Machado de Castro, hearing the comment, asked the Marquis of Marialva, King José I’s Master of the Horse, Pedro de Alcântara de Meneses, who had helped him in the conception of the statue since the sculptor knew little about horses, to explain to Their Majesties that this was due to inadequate lighting and the fact that the statue had not yet lost its luster. The following day, the Foundry House was opened to all “people of distinction and civility” to also see it, large crowds flocked to see the work over the next four days.

The statue was brought from the foundry to the still unfinished Praça do Comércio on May 25, 1775, and was inaugurated on June 6, during the festivities for the king's 61st birthday.

One of the main difficulties experienced by Machado de Castro was that King José refused to pose for the statue. The sculptor had to resort to other representations of the king, namely the profile effigy on the royal coin stamp, and decided to accentuate the plumed helmet in order to divert attention from the face.

== Description ==
The statue rests on a pedestal by Reinaldo Manuel dos Santos, with the combined height of the pedestal and statue measuring 14 meters. On the front of the pedestal, in addition to the royal arms, is a medallion with the bust of the Marquis of Pombal, who is thus also honored by the monument. This was removed two years later following the king's death, when Pombal fell out of favor, and was replaced in October 1834 on the orders of Pedro IV.

The bronze of the statue consists of copper (80 to 81%), zinc (10 to 14%), lead (2 to 3.3%) and tin (1.5 to 2.9%). The king is represented as looking to his right, aligned with the direction of the horse, which raises its right front leg. The horse's feet crush snakes in its path. The statue faces the Tagus River and is framed by the Rua Augusta Arch behind it, which intensifies the representation of royal power.
