= Memorial gates and arches =

Architectural monuments in the form of gates and arches

Memorial gates and arches are architectural monuments in the form of gates and arches or other entrances, constructed as a memorial, often dedicated to a particular war though some are dedicated to individuals. The function, and very often the architectural form, is similar to that of a Roman triumphal arch, with the emphasis on remembrance and commemoration of war casualties, on marking a civil event (the country's independence, for example), or on providing a monumental entrance to a city, as opposed to celebrating a military success or general, though some memorial arches perform both functions. They can vary in size, but are commonly monumental stone structures combining features of both an archway and a gate, often forming an entrance or straddling a roadway, but sometimes constructed in isolation as a standalone structure, or on a smaller scale as a local memorial to war dead. Although they can share architectural features with triumphal arches, memorial arches and gates constructed from the 20th century onwards often have the names of the dead inscribed on them as an act of commemoration.

== Memorial gates ==
=== Africa ===
==== Ghana ====
- Black Star Gate (1961), Accra
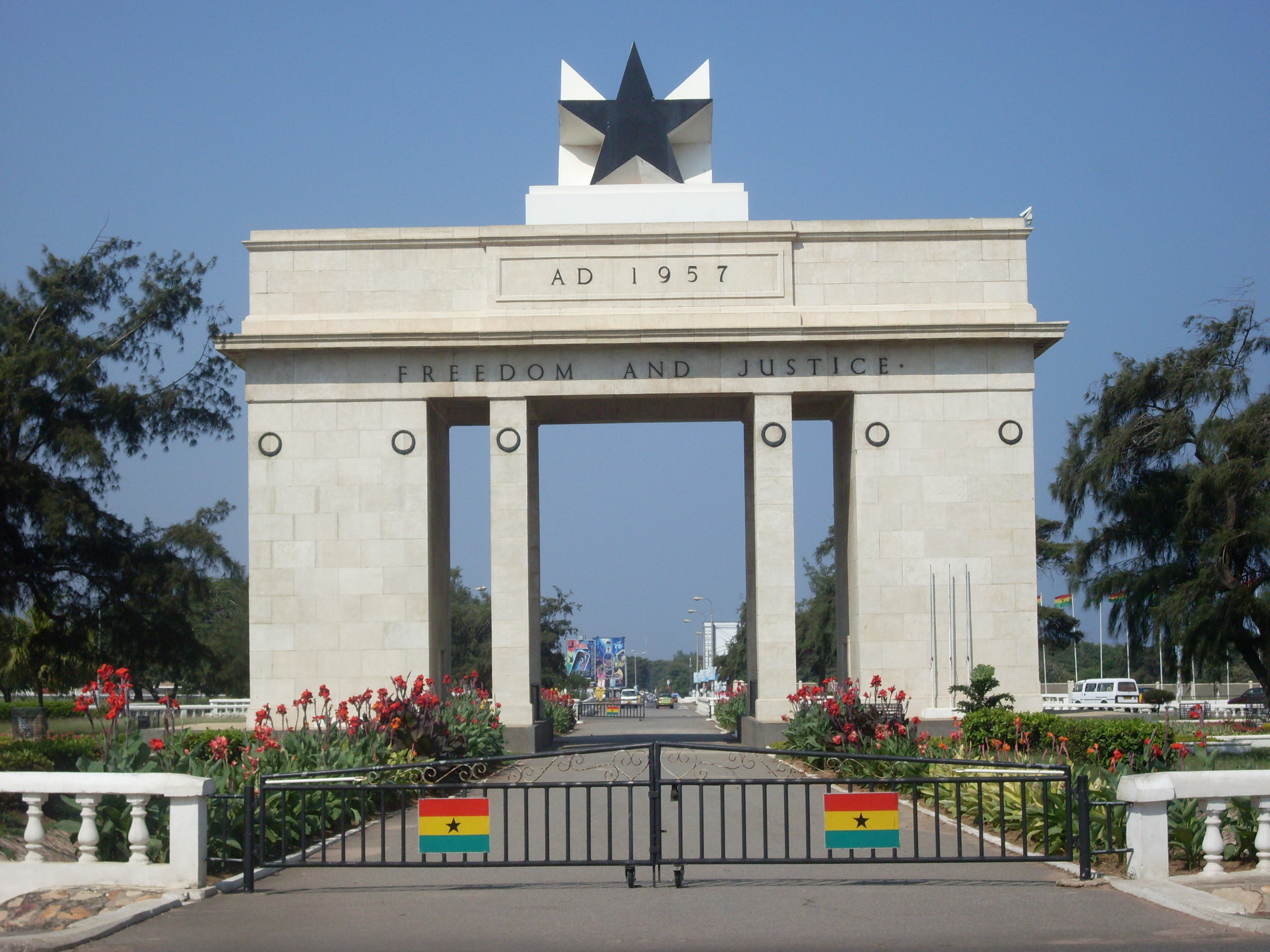
Black Star Gate, Accra, Ghana

=== Europe ===
==== Belgium ====
- Menin Gate, Ypres

==== France ====
- Porte Désilles, Nancy

==== Germany ====
- Brandenburg Gate, Berlin

==== United Kingdom ====
- University of Glasgow Memorial Gates, Glasgow
- Memorial Gates, London
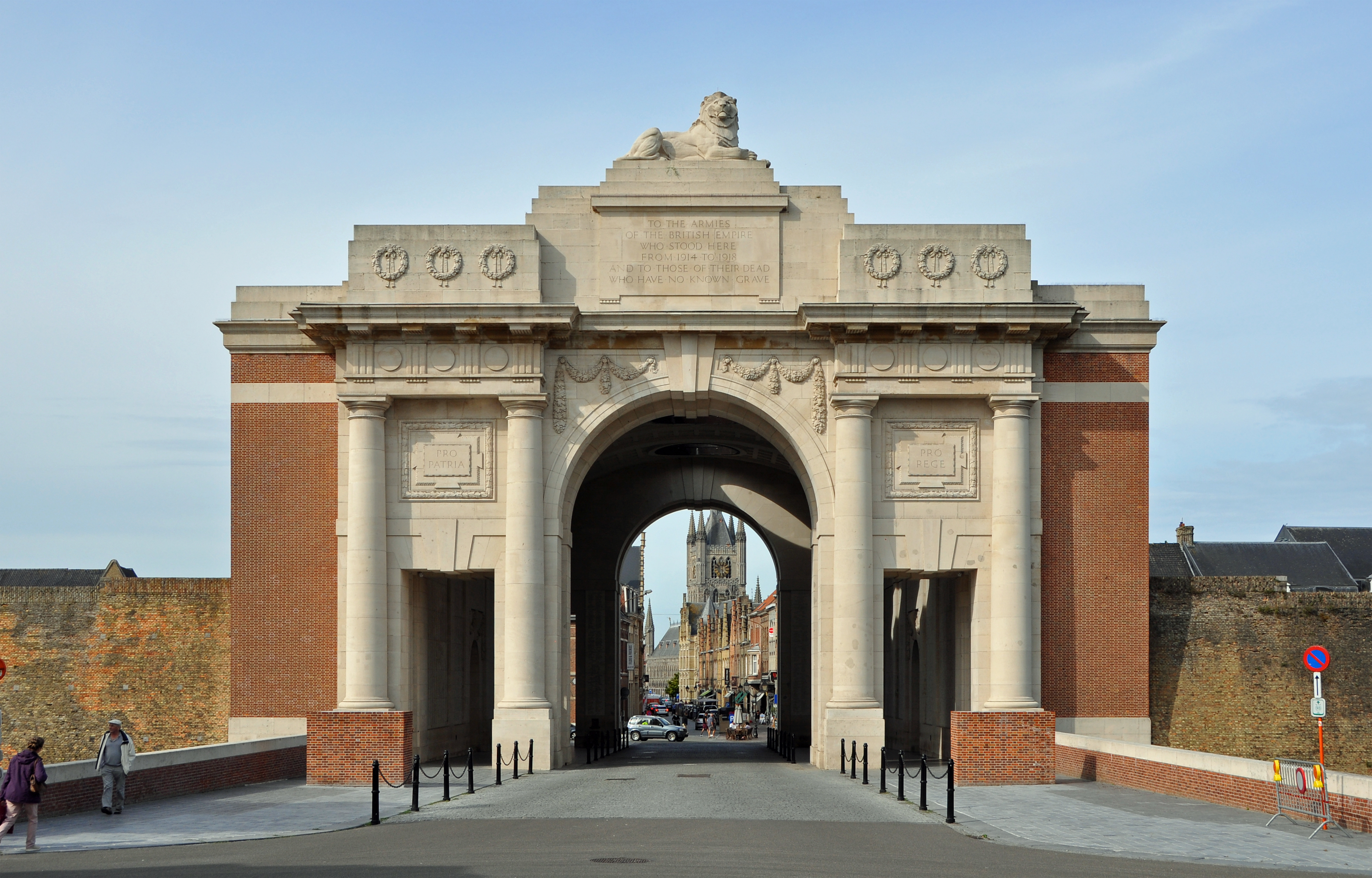
Menin Gate, Ypres, Belgium

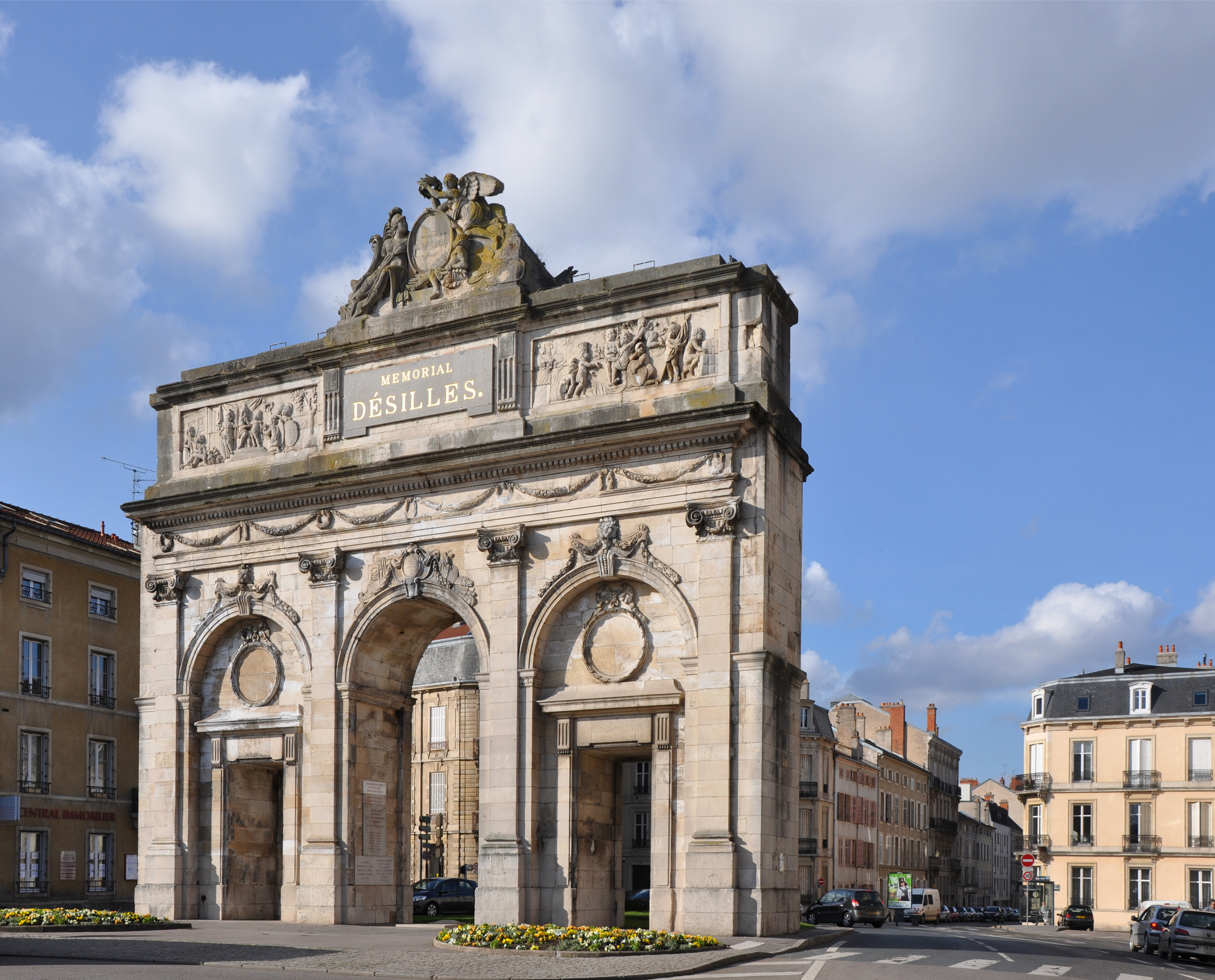
Porte Désilles, Nancy, France

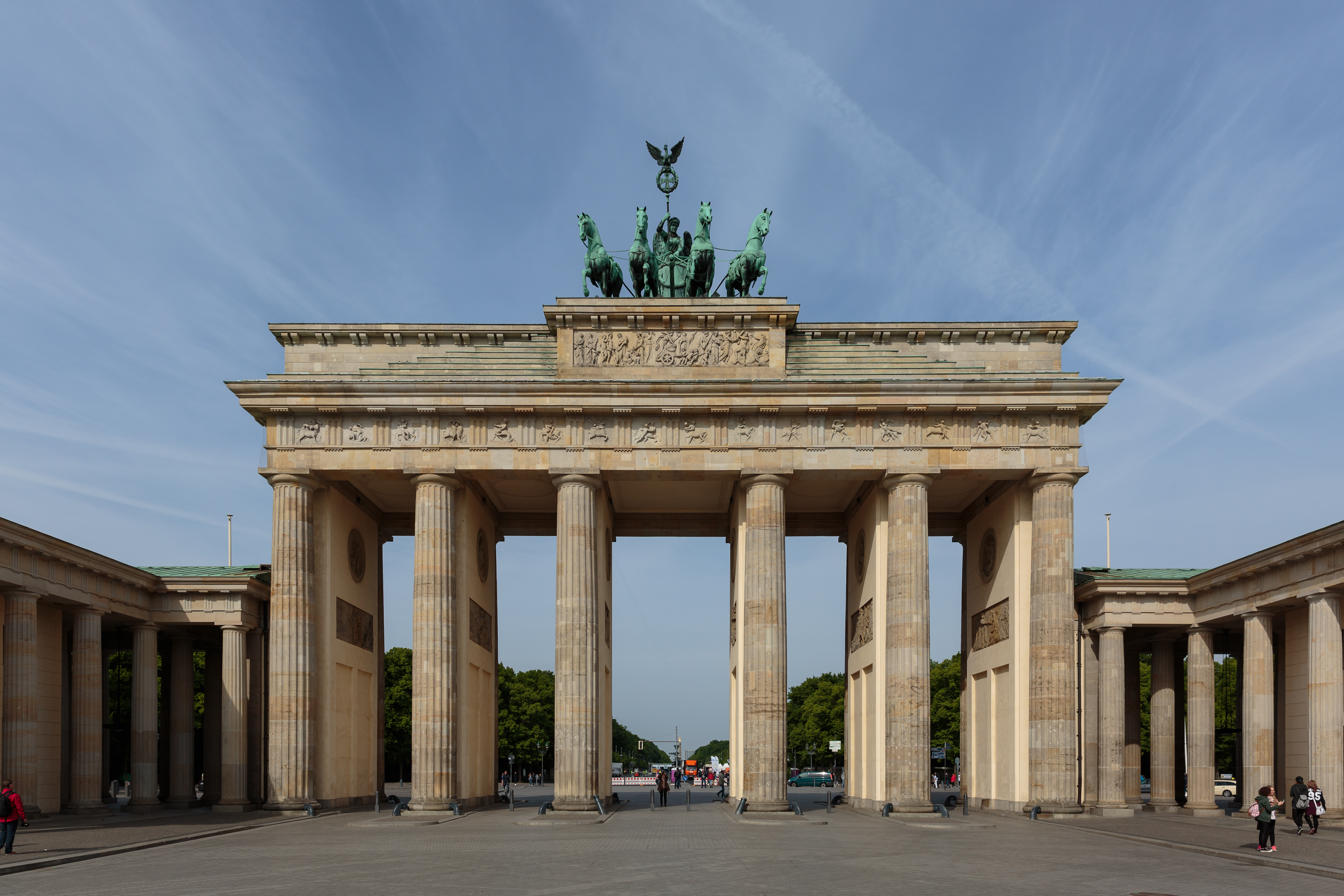
Brandenburg Gate, Berlin, Germany

=== North America ===
==== Canada ====
- Memorial Gates (University of Saskatchewan), Saskatoon
- Roddick Gates, Montreal

==== United States ====
- Hurlbut Memorial Gate, Detroit
- Confederate Memorial Gates in Mayfield
- Confederate Memorial Gateway in Hickman
- Soldiers Memorial Gate (Brown University)
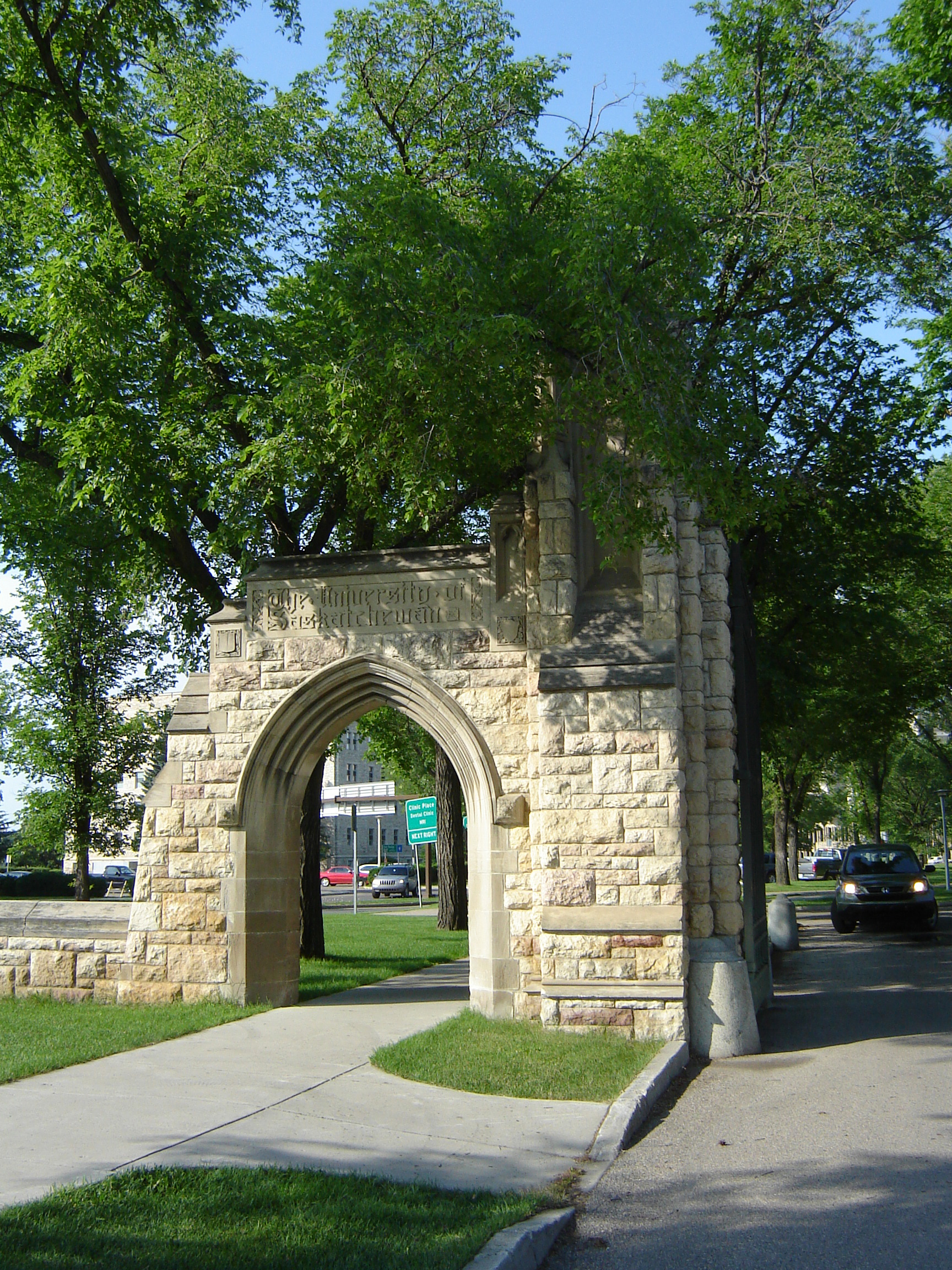
University of Saskatchewan Memorial Gates, Saskatoon, Saskatchewan, Canada

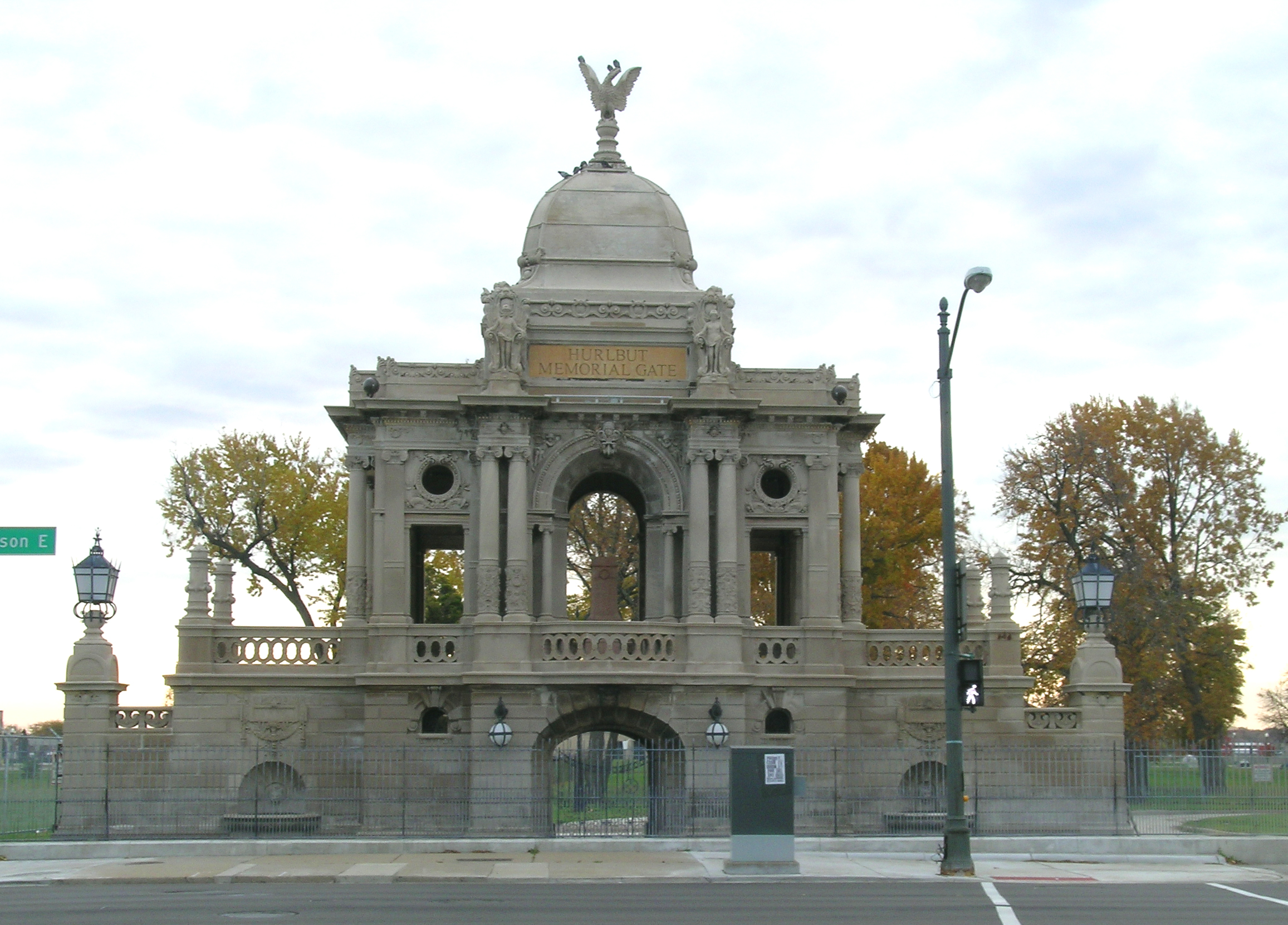
Hurlbut Memorial Gate, Detroit, Michigan, USA

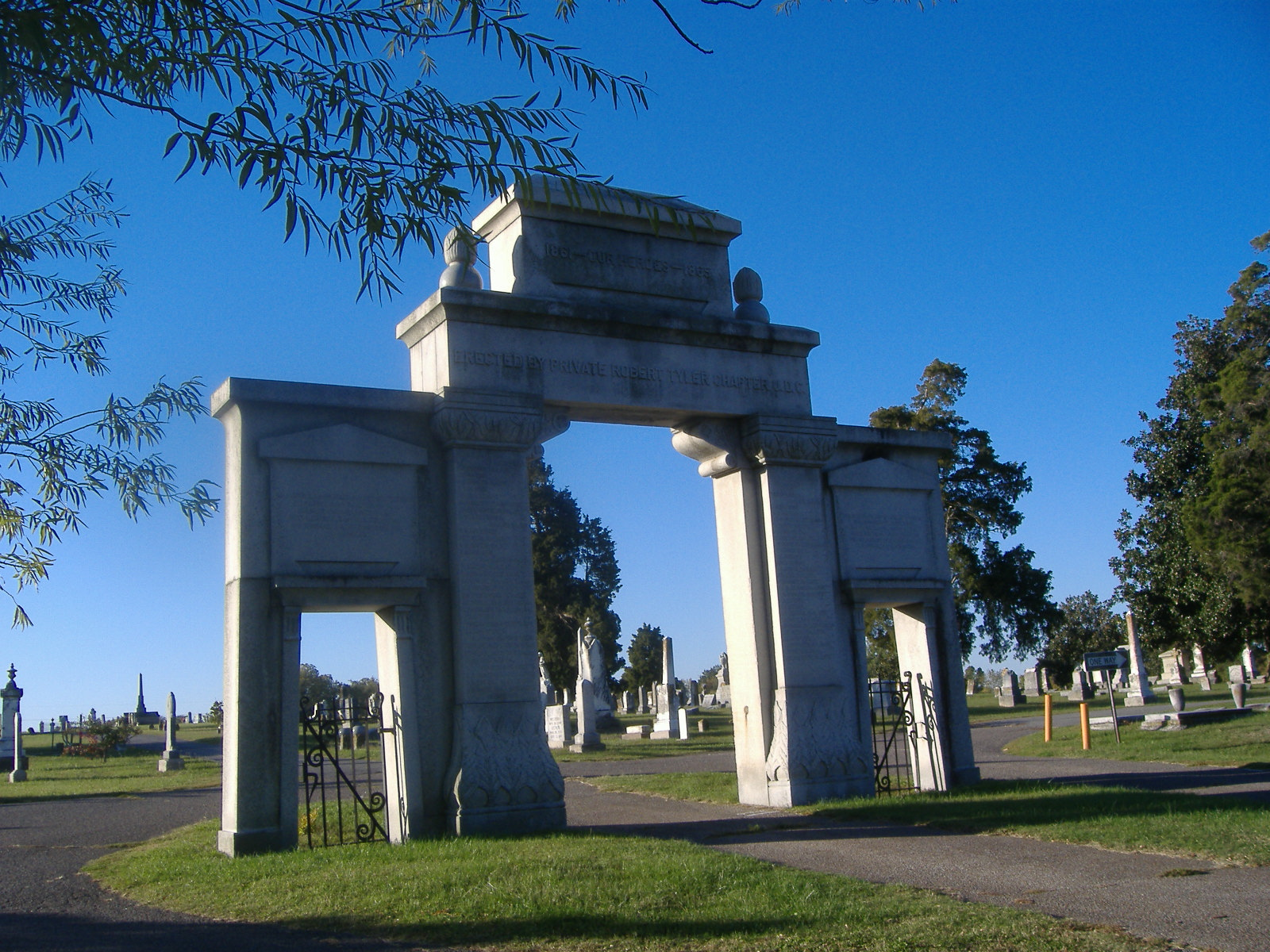
Confederate Memorial Gateway, Hickman, Kentucky, USA

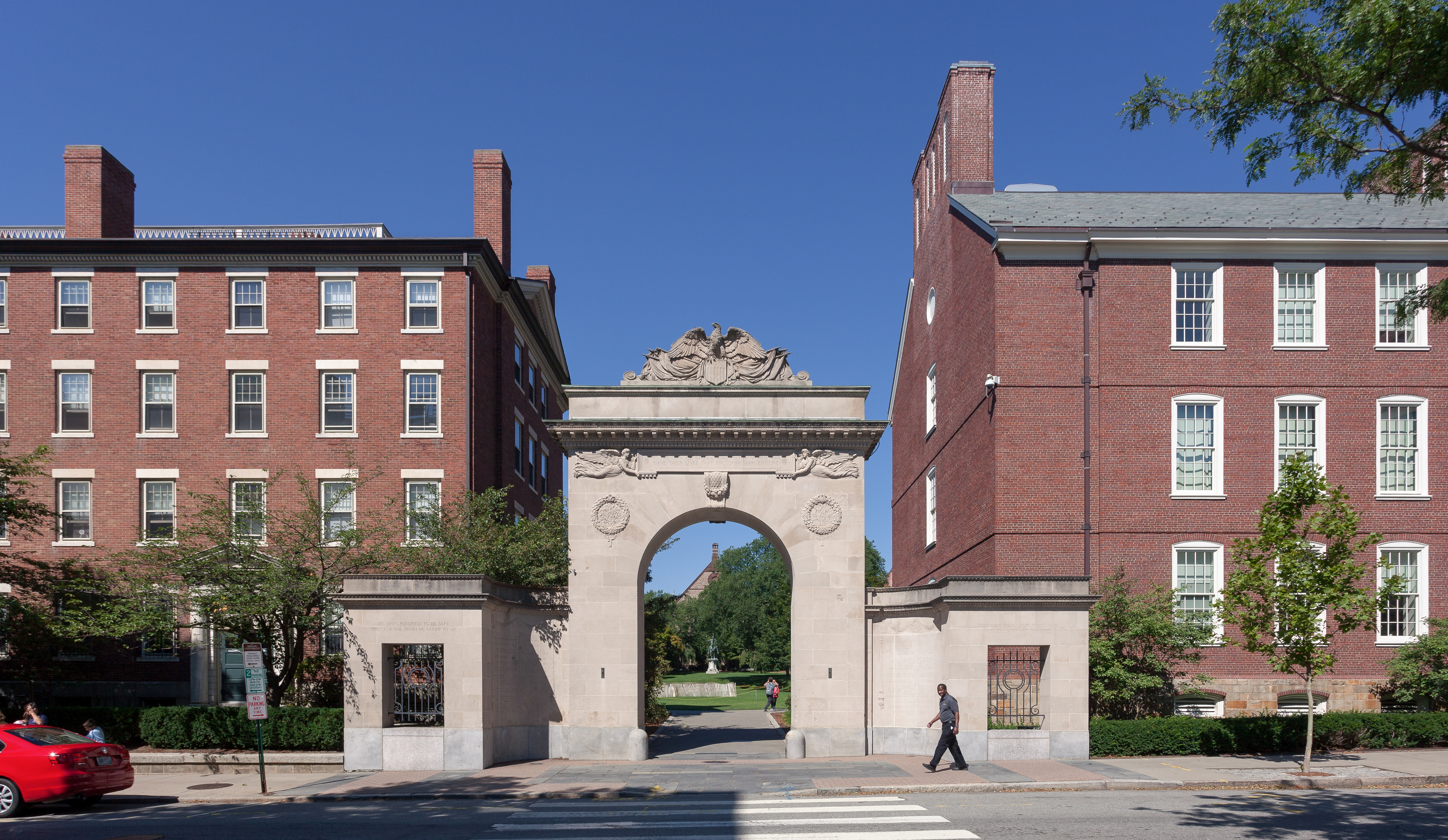
Soldiers Memorial Gate, Brown University, Providence, Rhode Island, USA

== Memorial arches ==
=== Asia ===
==== Afghanistan ====
- Taq-e Zafar (Arch of Victory) (1928), Paghman

==== India ====
- India Gate (1931), New Delhi
- Gateway of India (1924), Mumbai
- Sabhyata Dwar (2018), Patna

==== Iraq ====
- Swords of Qādisīyah (Victory Arch) (1989), Baghdad

==== Saudi Arabia ====
- Mecca Gate (1979), Jeddah
- Al-Abtal Gate (2013), Riyadh
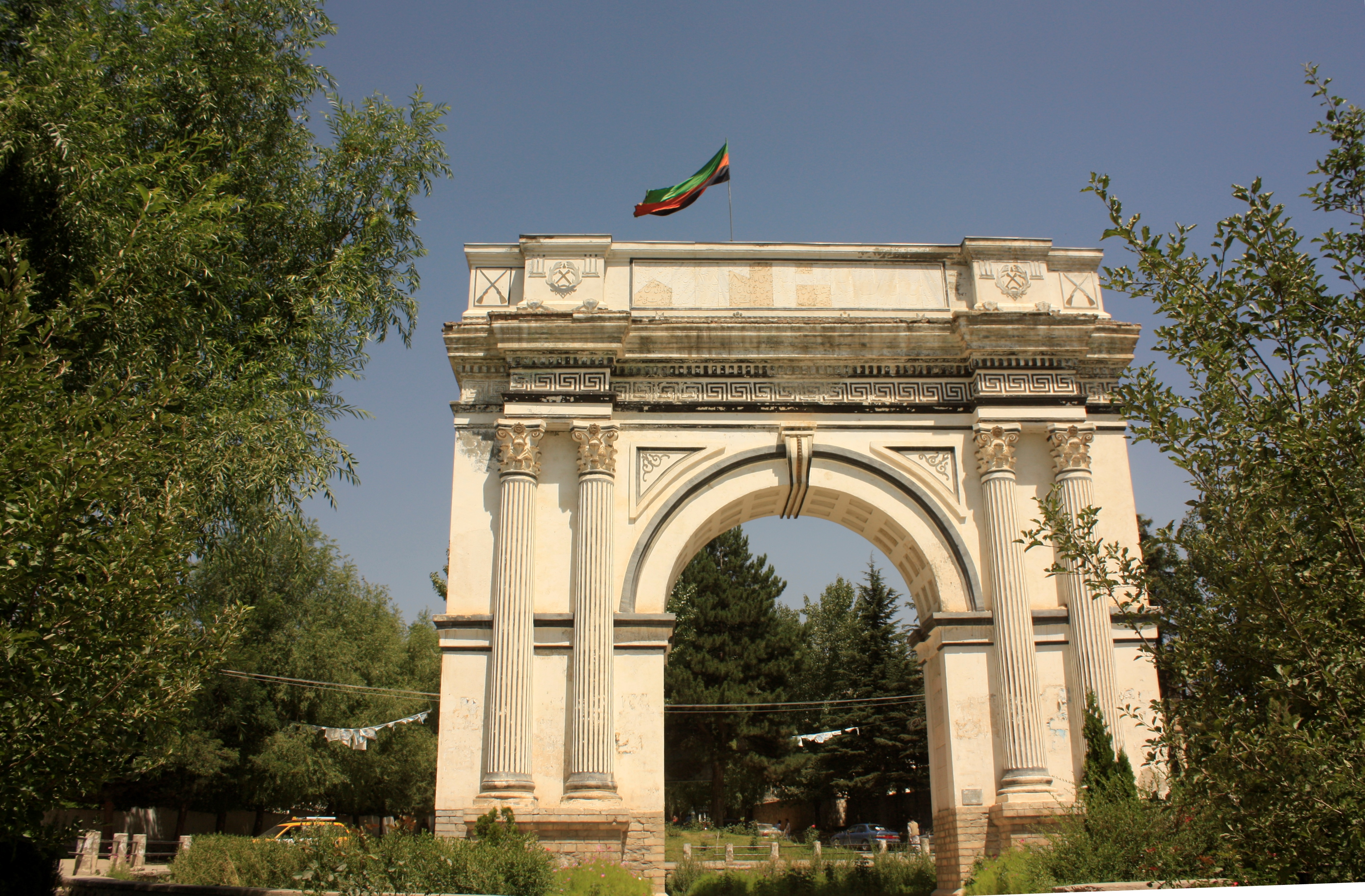
The Taq-e Zafar (Arch of Victory) in the gardens of Paghman near Kabul, Afghanistan, built to commemorate Afghan independence after the Third Anglo-Afghan War in 1919

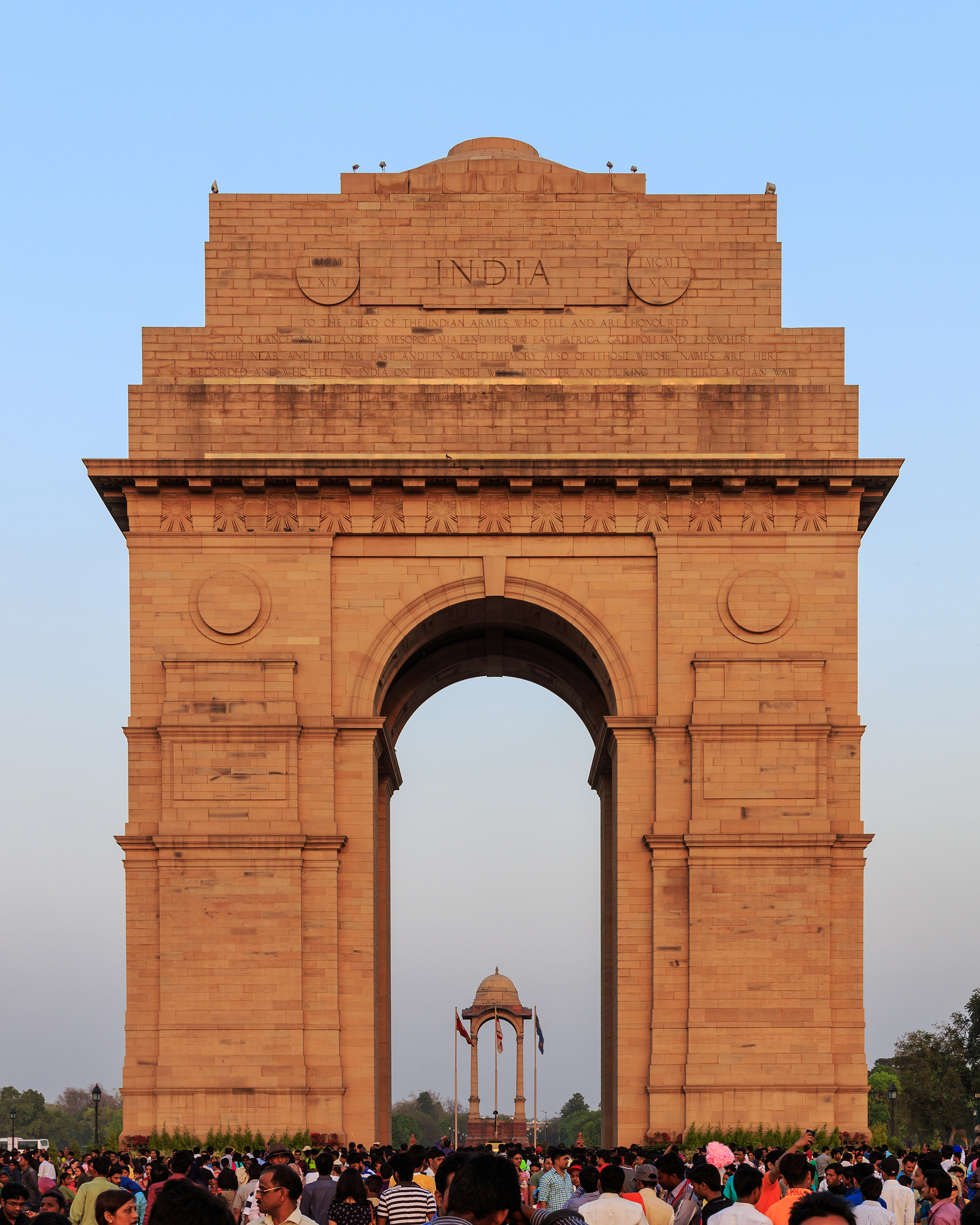
The India Gate, built in 1921–1931, is a war memorial located near the Rajpath, on the eastern edge of the "ceremonial axis" of New Delhi, India.

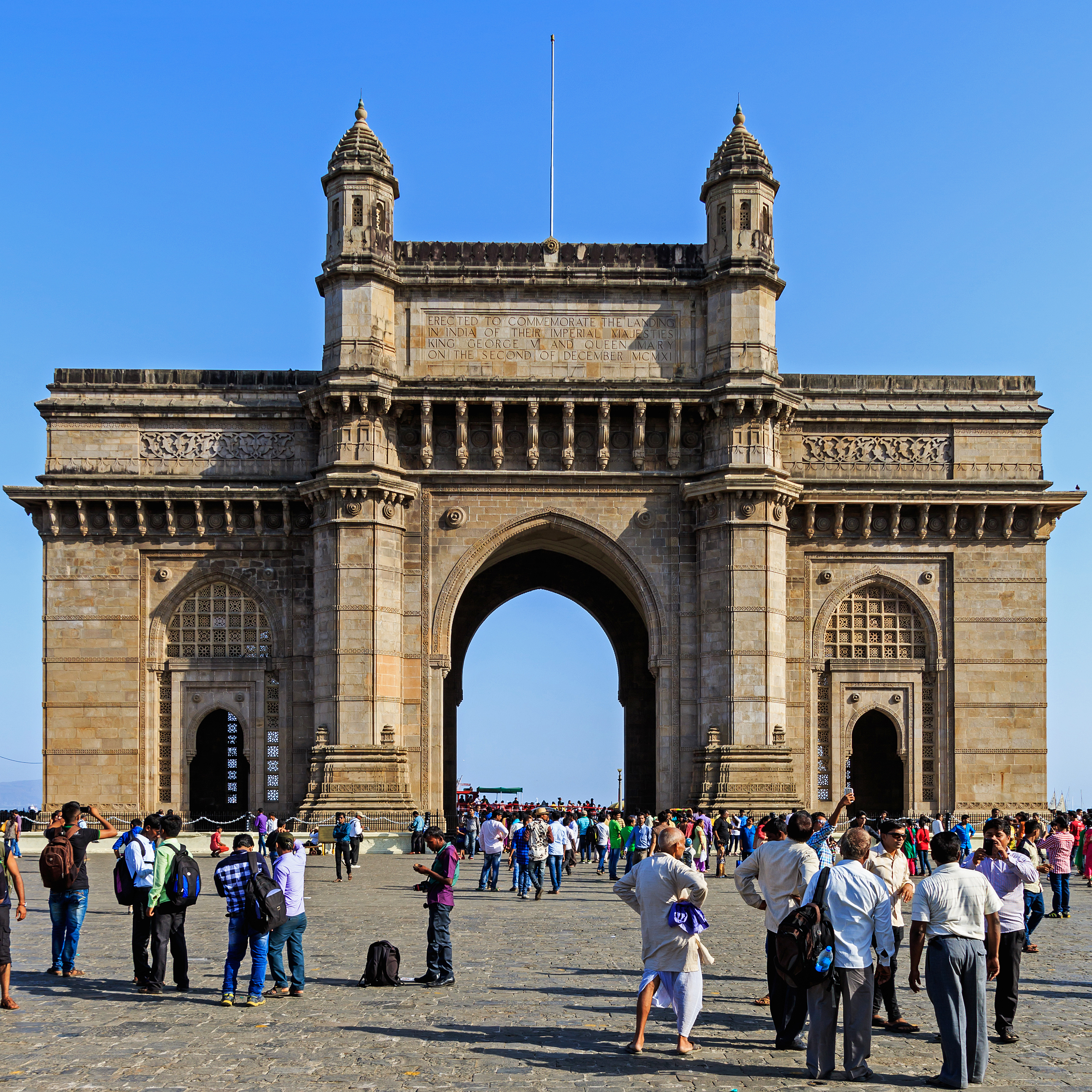
The Gateway of India is an arch-monument built in 1913–1924 in Mumbai, India, to commemorate the landing of Emperor George V, the first British monarch to the country, in December 1911.

Al-Abtal Gate in Riyadh, Saudi Arabia, was built in 2013 to commemorate the Battle of Riyadh in 1902

=== Europe ===
==== Belgium ====
- Cinquantenaire Arcade (1905), Brussels

==== France ====
- Arc de Triomphe de l'Étoile (1836), Paris
- Thiepval Memorial (1932), Thiepval

==== Germany ====
- Siegestor (1850), Munich

==== Ireland ====
- Fusiliers' Arch (1907), Dublin

==== Italy ====
- Arco della Vittoria (1931), Genoa

==== North Macedonia ====
- Porta Macedonia (2012), Skopje

==== Portugal ====
- Rua Augusta Arch (1873), Lisbon

==== Spain ====
- Arc de Triomf (1888), Barcelona

==== United Kingdom ====
- Arch of Remembrance (1925), WWI memorial in Leicester
- City War Memorial (1927), WWI memorial in Nottingham
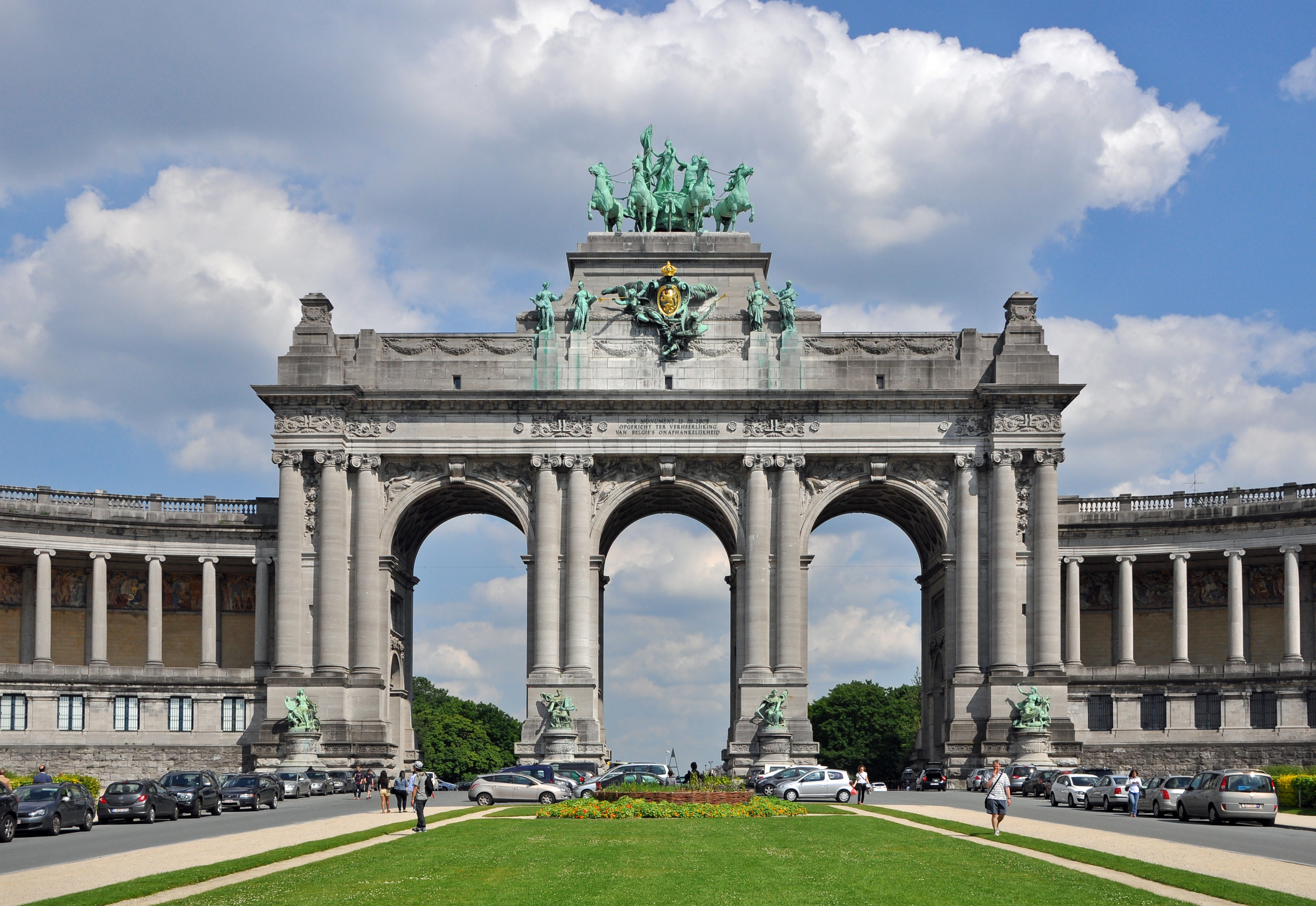
The Cinquantenaire Arcade in Brussels, Belgium, built for the National Exhibition of 1880 to commemorate the 50th anniversary of Belgian independence

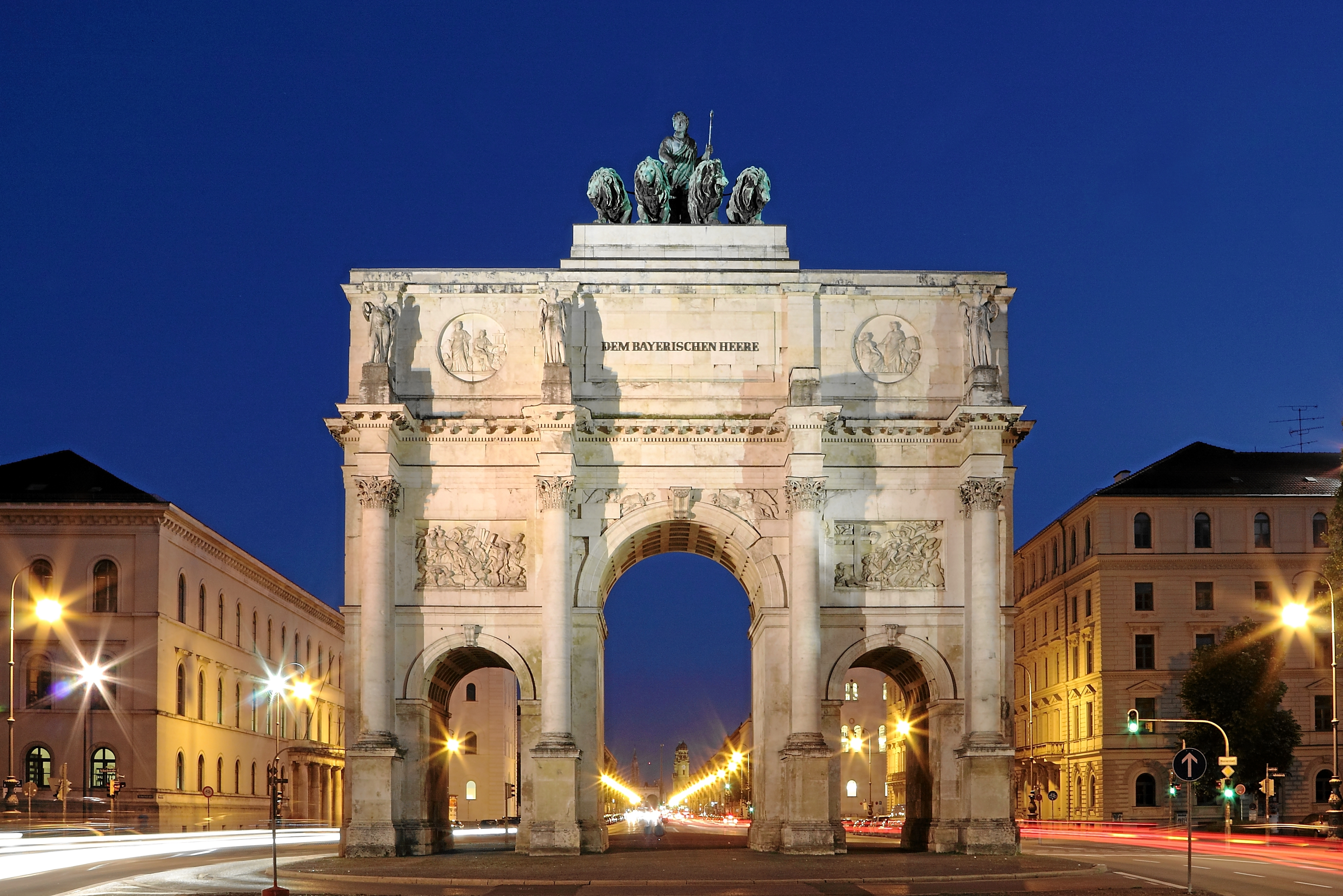
The Siegestor in Munich, Germany, a Bavarian army monument, destroyed in World War II but partially rebuilt as a reminder for peace

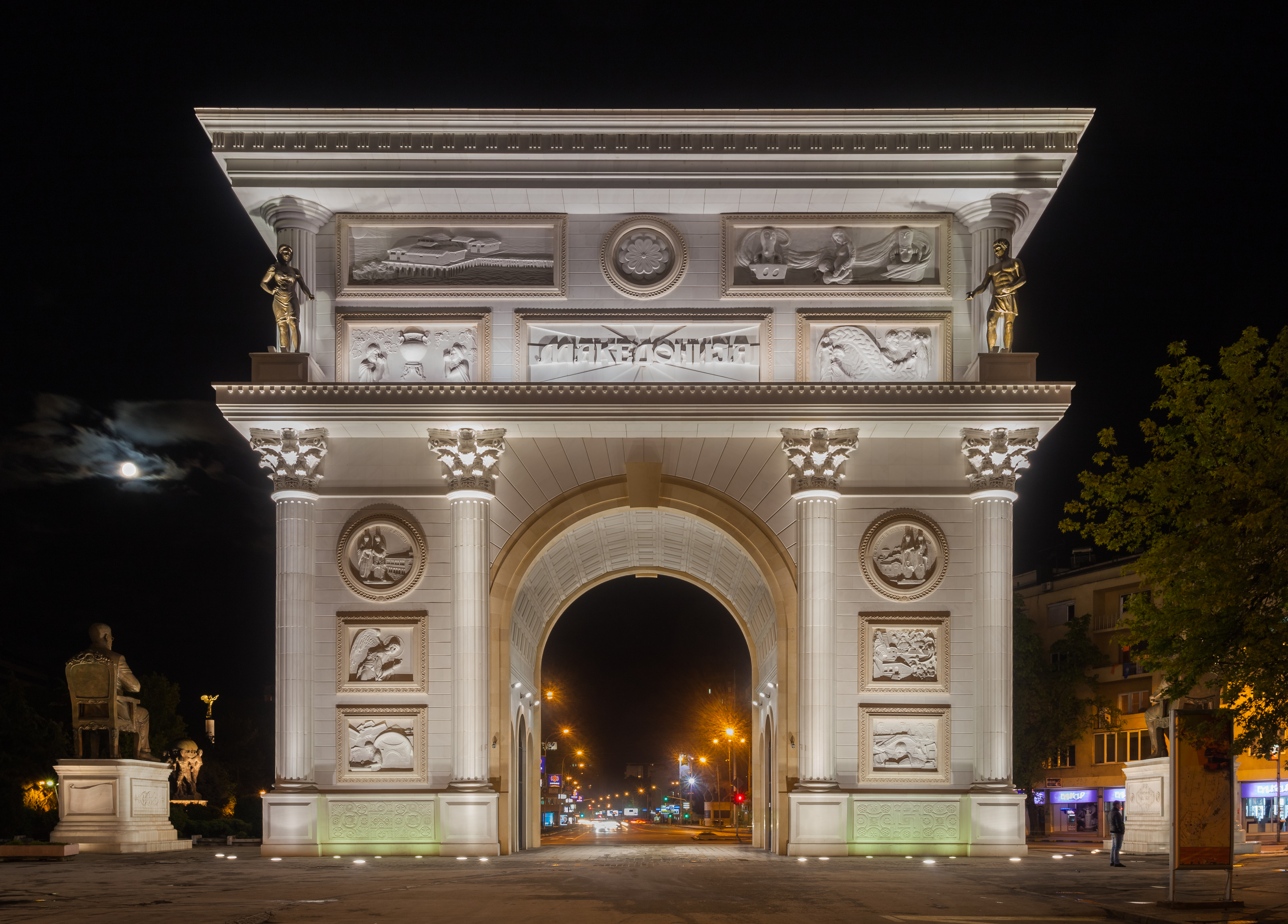
Porta Macedonia in Skopje, North Macedonia, is dedicated to 20 years of Macedonian independence, 2012

The Rua Augusta Arch in Praça do Comércio, Lisbon, Portugal, built to commemorate the city's reconstruction after the 1755 earthquake

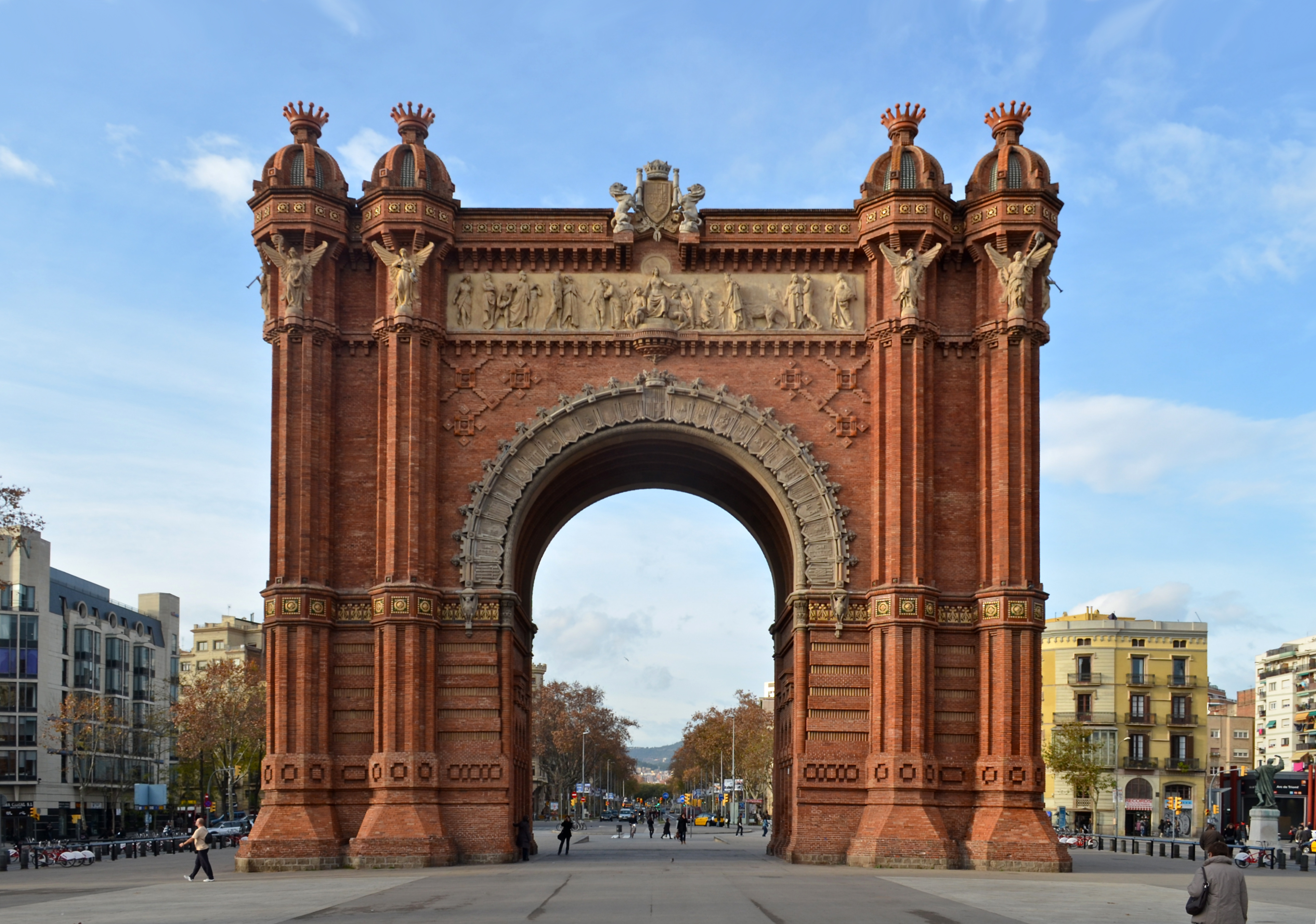
The Arc de Triomf in Barcelona, Spain, built in 1888 as the main access gate for the 1888 Barcelona World Fair

=== North America ===
==== Canada ====
- Peace Arch (1921), Canada–US border
- National War Memorial (1939), Ottawa
- Royal Military College of Canada Memorial Arch, Kingston

==== Mexico ====
- Monumento a la Revolución (1938), Mexico City

==== United States ====
- Memorial Arch of Tilton (1882), Northfield, New Hampshire
- Soldiers and Sailors Memorial Arch (1886), Hartford, Connecticut
- Soldiers' and Sailors' Arch (1892), Brooklyn, New York City
- Washington Square Arch (1892), Manhattan, New York City
- War Correspondents Memorial Arch (1896), Gathland State Park, Maryland
- Confederate Memorial (1902), Fulton, Kentucky
- Confederate Soldier Memorial (1902), Columbus, Ohio
- Smith Memorial Arch (1912), West Fairmount Park, Philadelphia, Pennsylvania
- Pennsylvania State Memorial, Gettysburg (1914), Pennsylvania
- National Memorial Arch (1917), Valley Forge, Pennsylvania
- Victory Arch (1919), Macarty Square, New Orleans, Louisiana
- Victory Gate (1919, razed 1920), Madison Square Park, Manhattan, New York City
- Rosedale World War I Memorial Arch (1924), Kansas City, Kansas
- Memorial Arch (1924), Huntington, West Virginia
- Gateway Arch (1965), St. Louis, Missouri
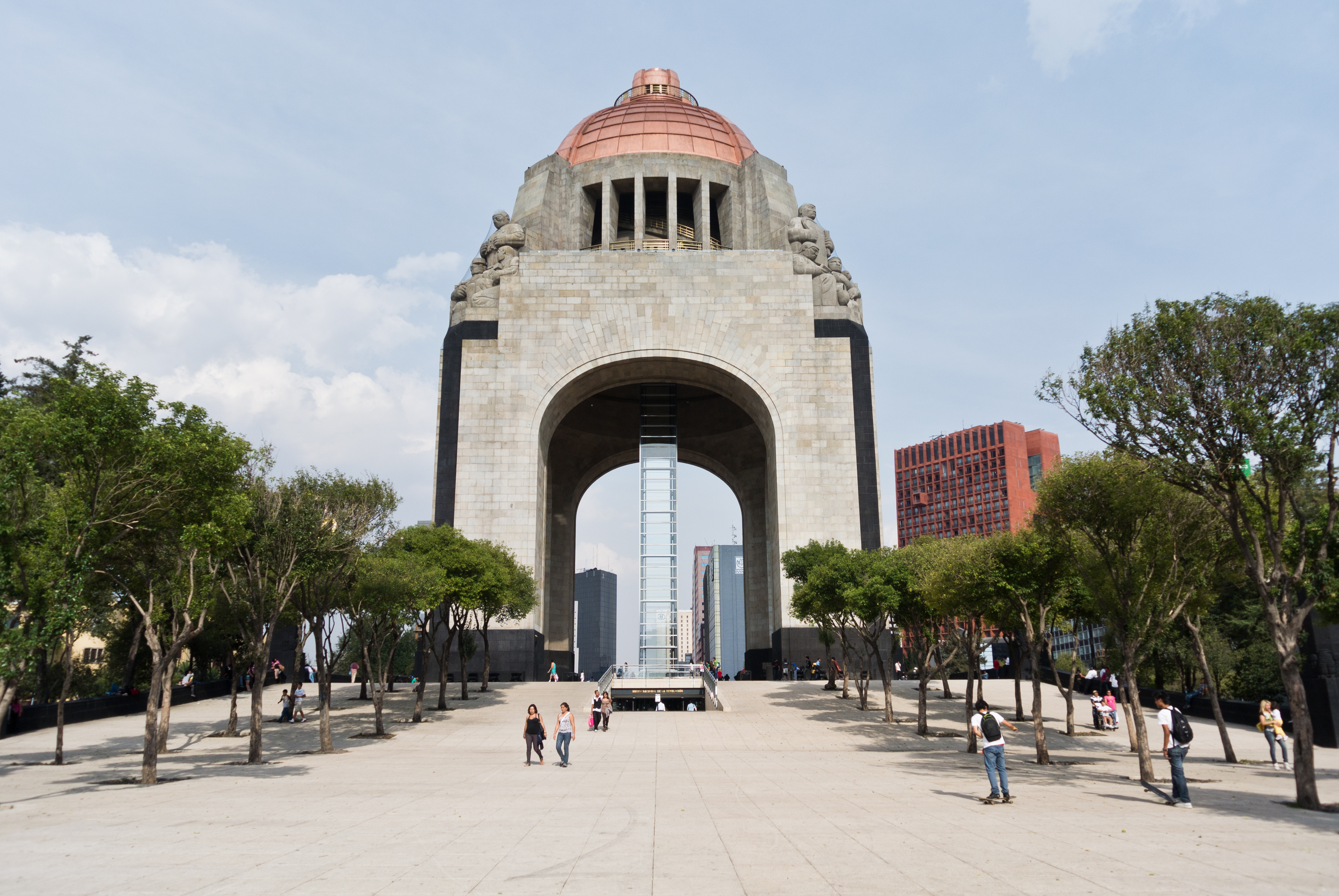
Monumento a la Revolución in Mexico City, Mexico, the tallest memorial arch in the world, 1938

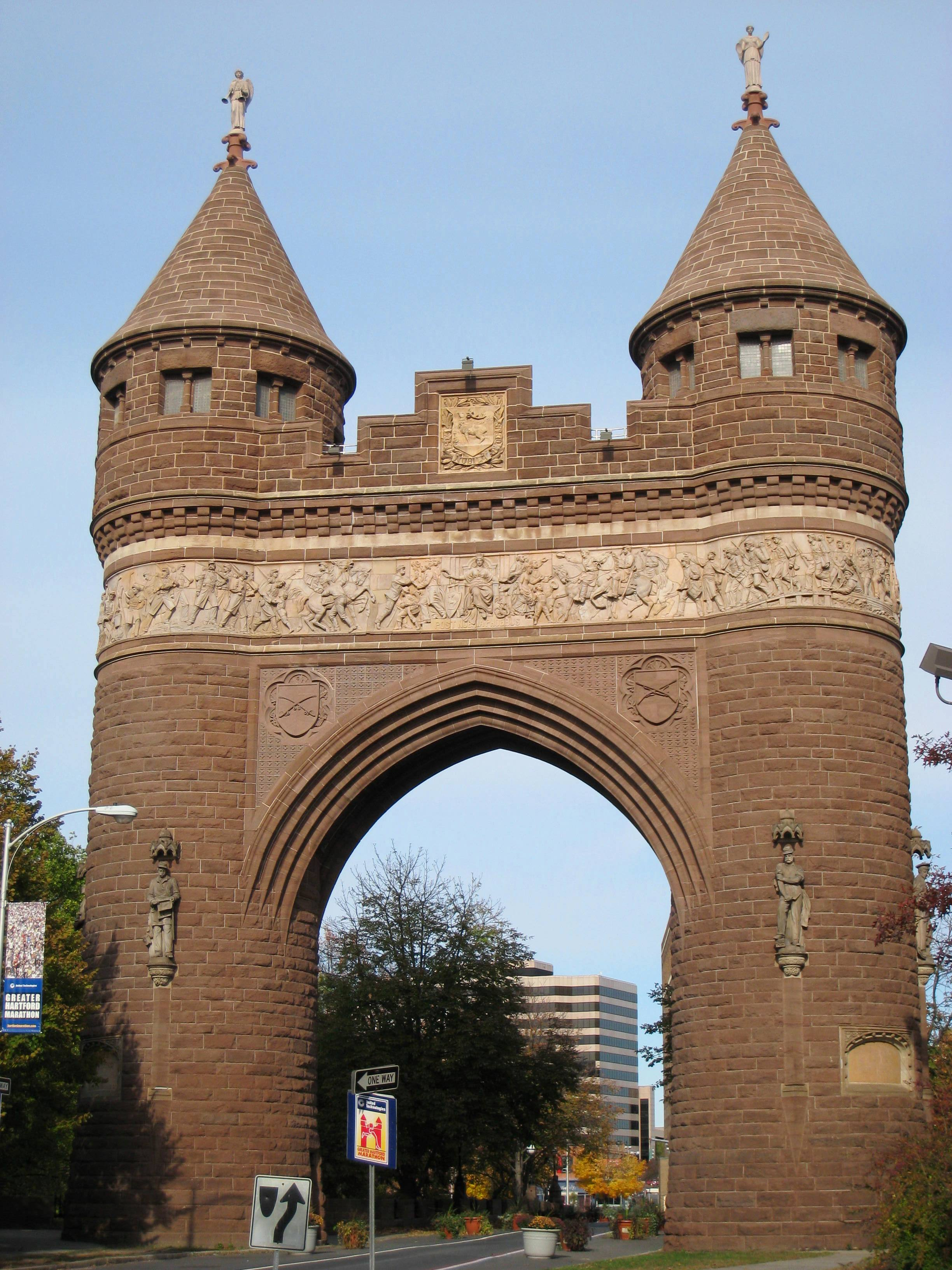
Soldiers and Sailors Memorial Arch, Hartford, Connecticut, USA

Washington Square Arch, Manhattan, New York City, USA

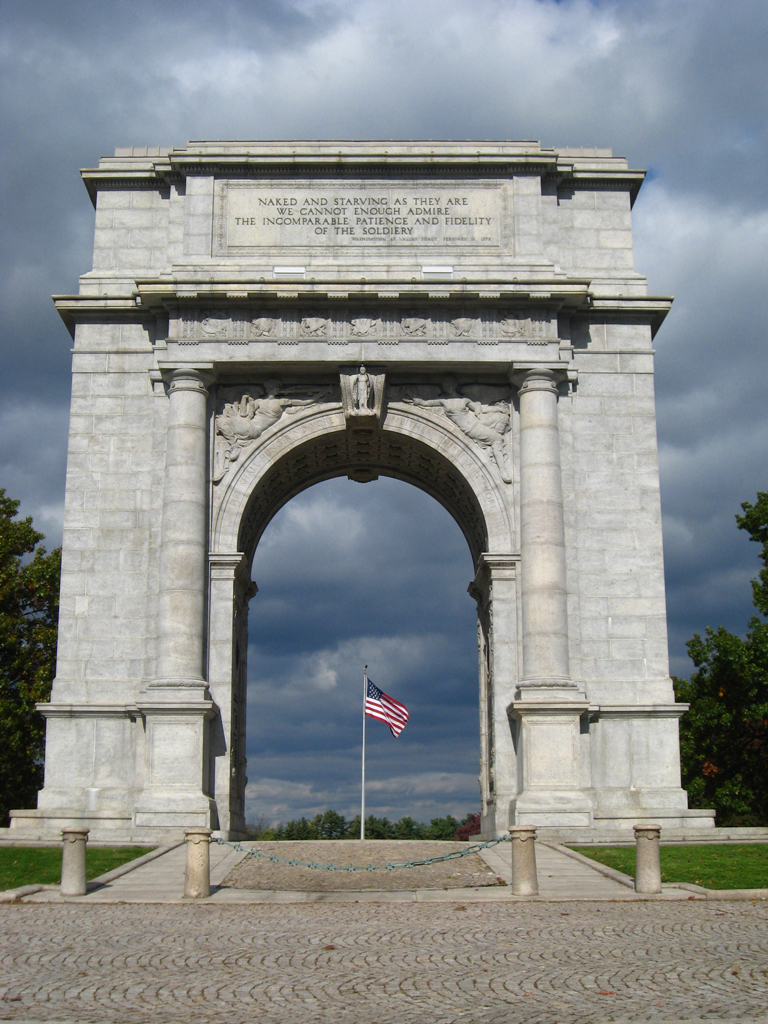
National Memorial Arch, a Revolutionary War memorial in Valley Forge National Historical Park, Chester County, Pennsylvania, USA

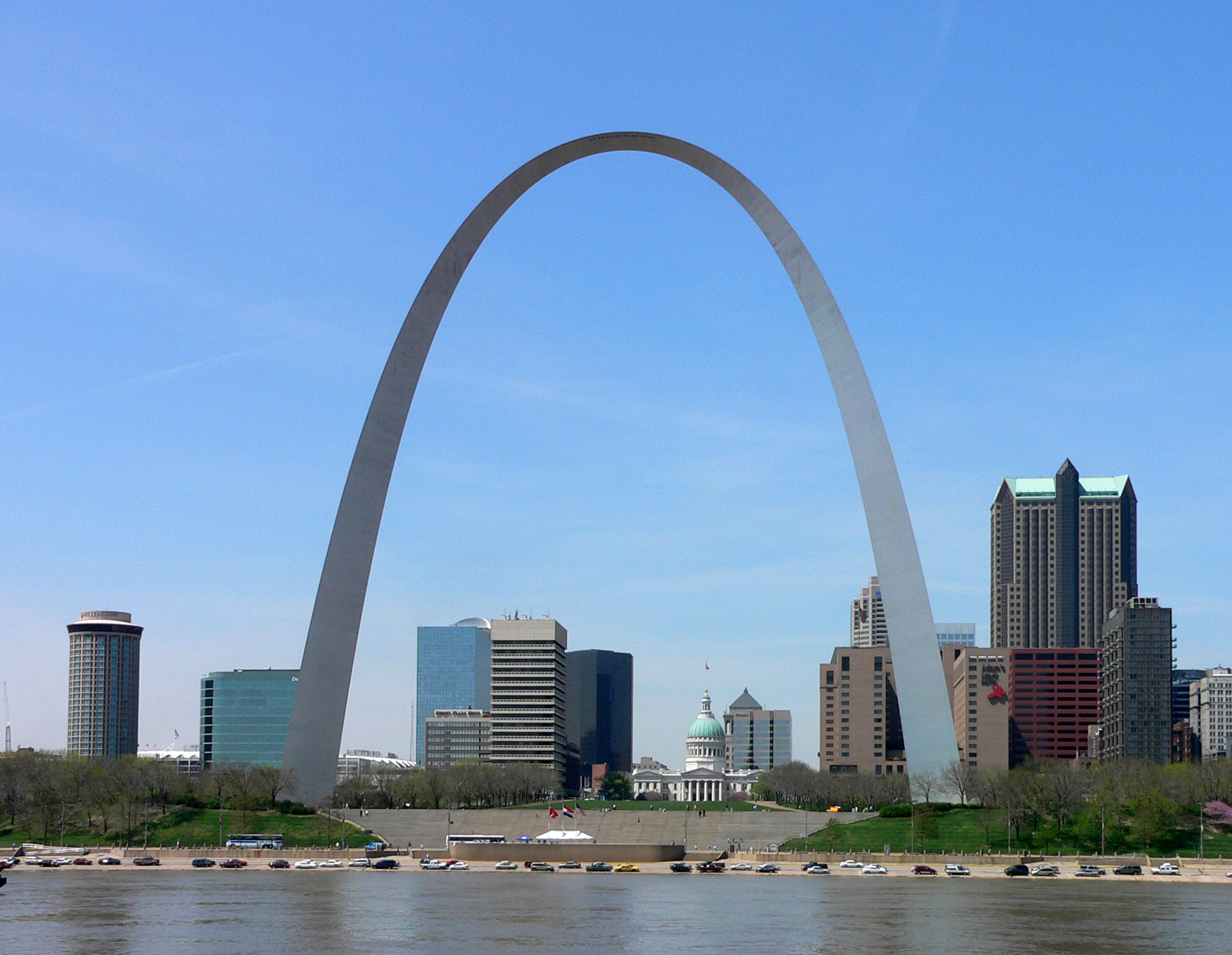
Gateway Arch, St. Louis, Missouri, USA
