= Calmels =

Calmels is a French surname. Notable people with the surname include:

- Célestin Anatole Calmels (1822–1906), French sculptor
- Fabrice Calmels (born 1980), French ballet dancer
- François Calmels (born 1981), French golfer
- Virginie Calmels (born 1971), French businesswoman and politician
