= Al Abtal Gate =

Monument in Riyadh, Saudi Arabia

Al-Abtal Gate
- بوابة الأبطال
- Al-Abtal Gate monument, 2023, on the side of Nemar suburb
- Interactive map of Al-Abtal Gate
- Location: Highway 40, Riyadh, Saudi Arabia
- Coordinates: 24°31′33″N 46°26′15″E
- Beginning date: 2001
- Opening date: 21 April 2013; 13 years ago
- Dedicated to: Abdulaziz ibn Saud

Al-Abtal Gate (Arabic: بوابة الأبطال, lit. 'Gate of the Heroes'), or Riyadh al-Gharbia Gate (Arabic: بوابة الرياض الغربية, lit. 'Western Gate of Riyadh'), is a pair of symmetrical memorial monuments situated on either side of Highway 40 (Makkah al-Mukarramah Road) at the Qiddiya civilian checkpoint in southwestern Riyadh, Saudi Arabia, officially partitioned between King Abdullah City for Atomic and Renewable Energy from the north and Nemar suburb from the south. Constructed from 2001 to 2013 and modelled mainly after the Al-Masmak Palace, it commemorates the Battle of Riyadh of 1902 and is a local visitor attraction besides being a stopover for travellers passing through the city’s western exit.

== History ==
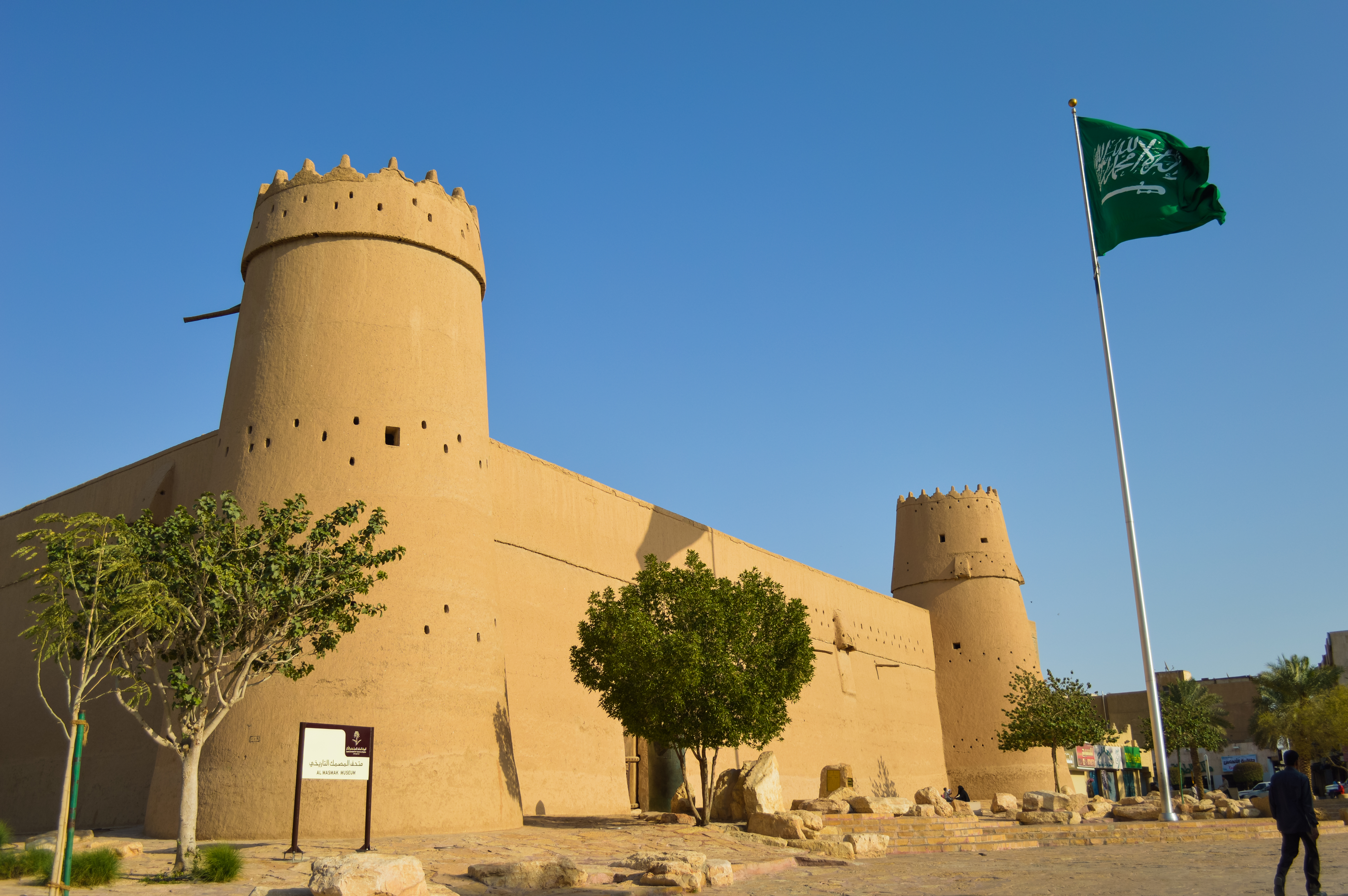
Masmak Fort in Riyadh, which the al-Abtal Gate is mainly modeled after

The monument was inaugurated in 2013 during the reign of King Abdullah bin Abdulaziz and pays a tribute to King Abdulaziz ibn Saud and his companions in their efforts to recapture the walled town of Riyadh in a battle in 1902. It resembles the cylindrical mudbrick watchtowers of Masmak Fortress and those of the former city fortifications of the old walled town.

The monument showcases a model of King Abdulaziz's sword, cleaving a sizeable rock that symbolizes the hardships endured by the people in the former days, paving the way for prosperity as spring flowed. Behind it stand 13 flags, each representing a province of Saudi Arabia. Surrounding the monument are 64 panels that are inscribed with the names of companions of King Abdulaziz, who assisted him during the battle for the takeover of Riyadh.

Construction for the project began during the reign of King Fahd bin Abdulaziz, in 2001 and was a brainchild of Prince Turki bin Talal al-Saud. The monument was inaugurated by Prince Khalid bin Bandar al-Saud, the Governor of Riyadh Province in April 2013.

== Gallery ==
Bronze monument depicting the Sword of King Abdulaziz and the names of his companions, 2023

Al-Abtal Gate panoramic view on the side of Nemar suburb, 2023
