= Memorial Gates (University of Saskatchewan) =

Monument in Canada

- University of Saskatchewan
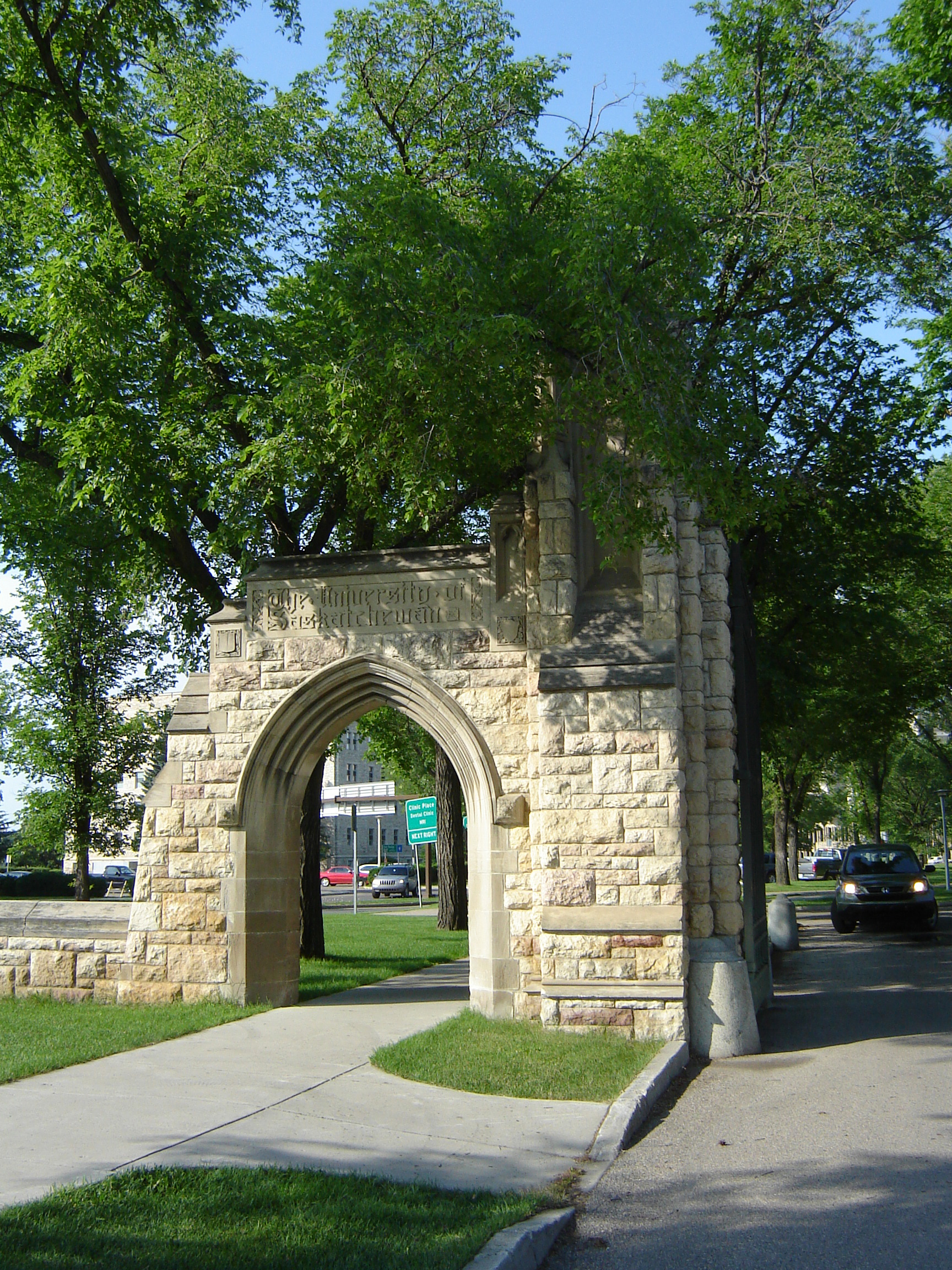
- U of S Memorial Gates
- For World War I
- Location: 52°07′45.43″N 106°38′34.05″W near Saskatoon

Burials by nation
- Canada

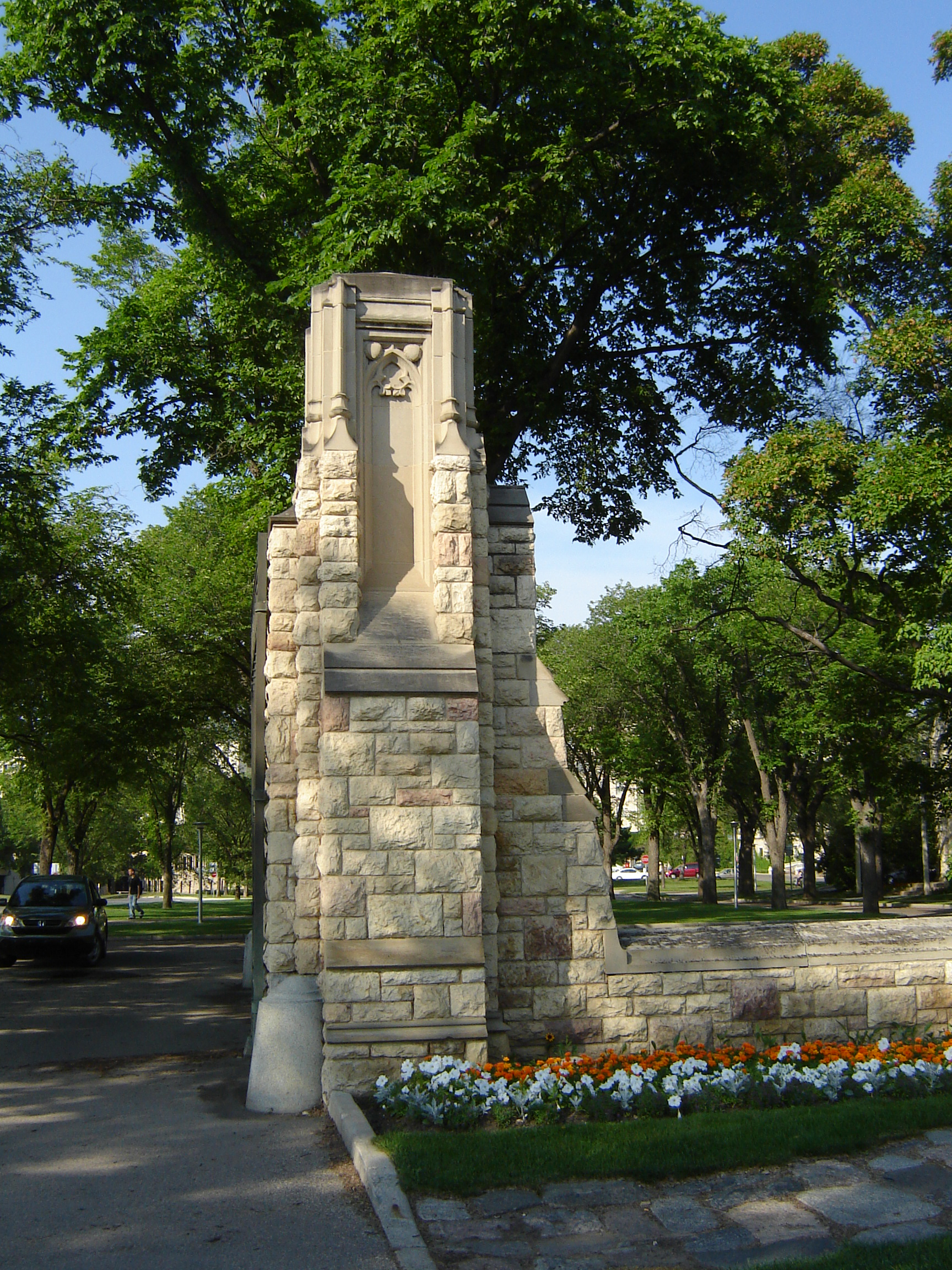
U of S Memorial Gates Saskatoon

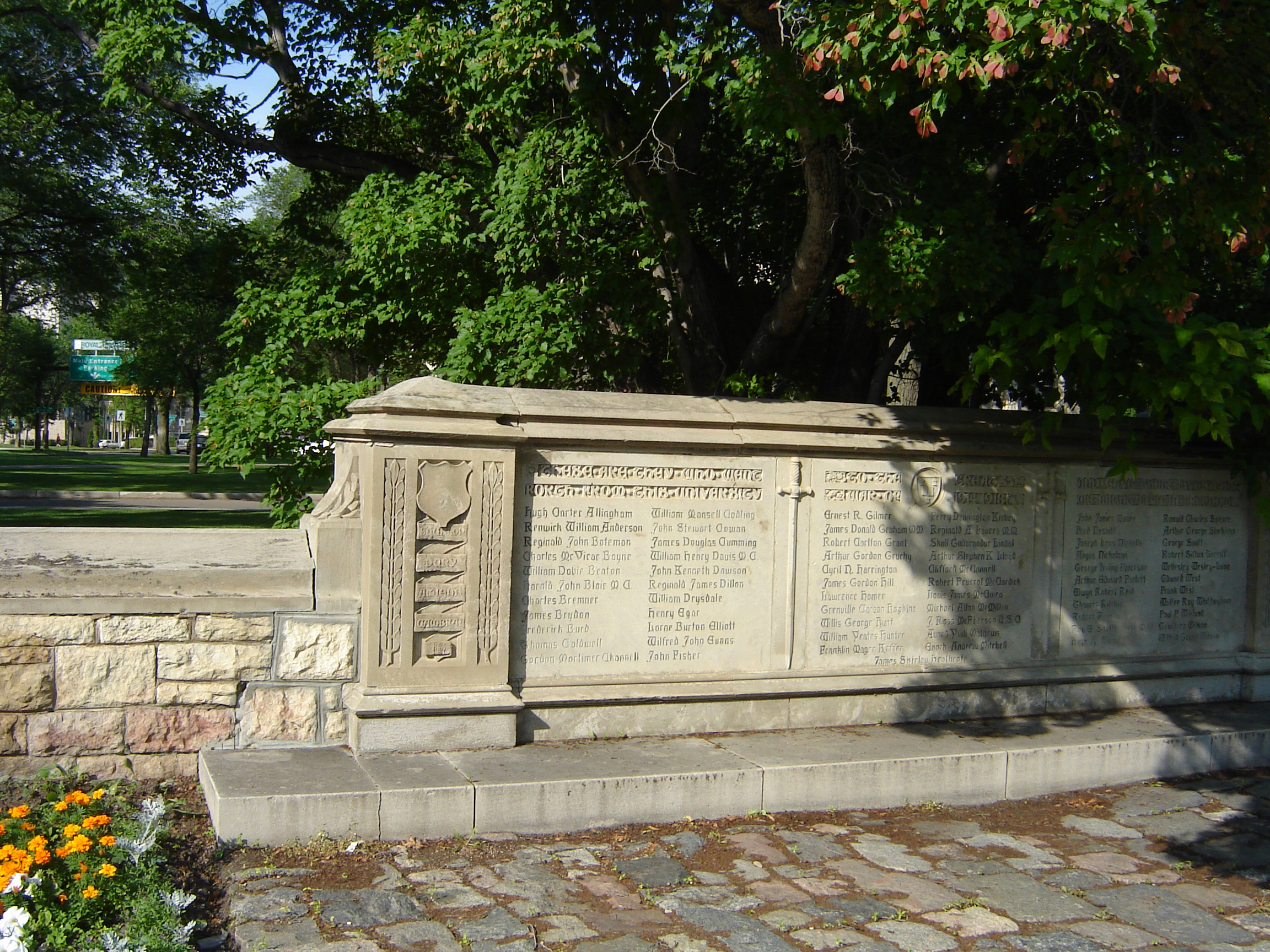
FallenU of S Memorial Gates Saskatoon

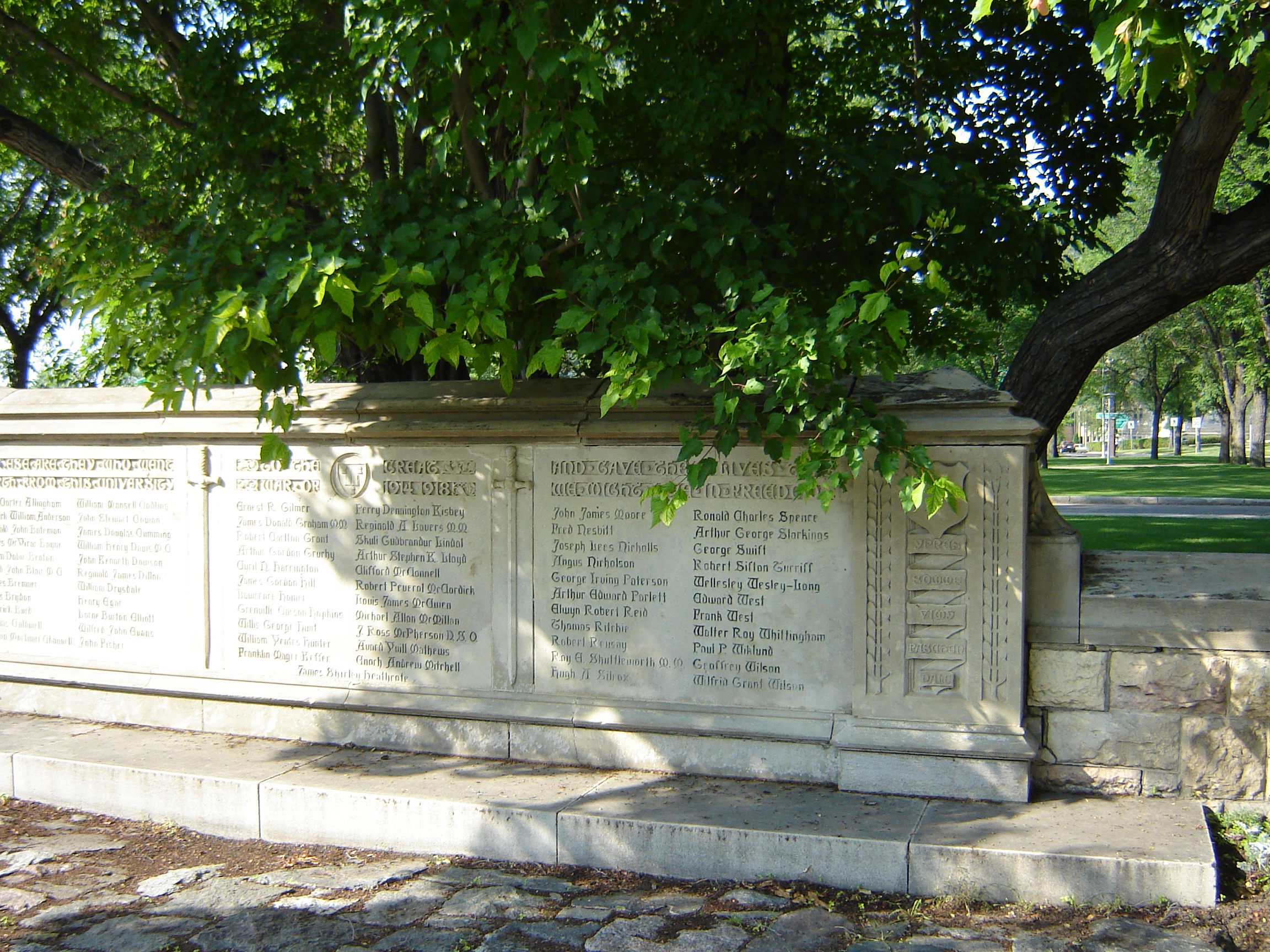
Listing of those who gave their lives in the great war U of S Memorial Gates Saskatoon

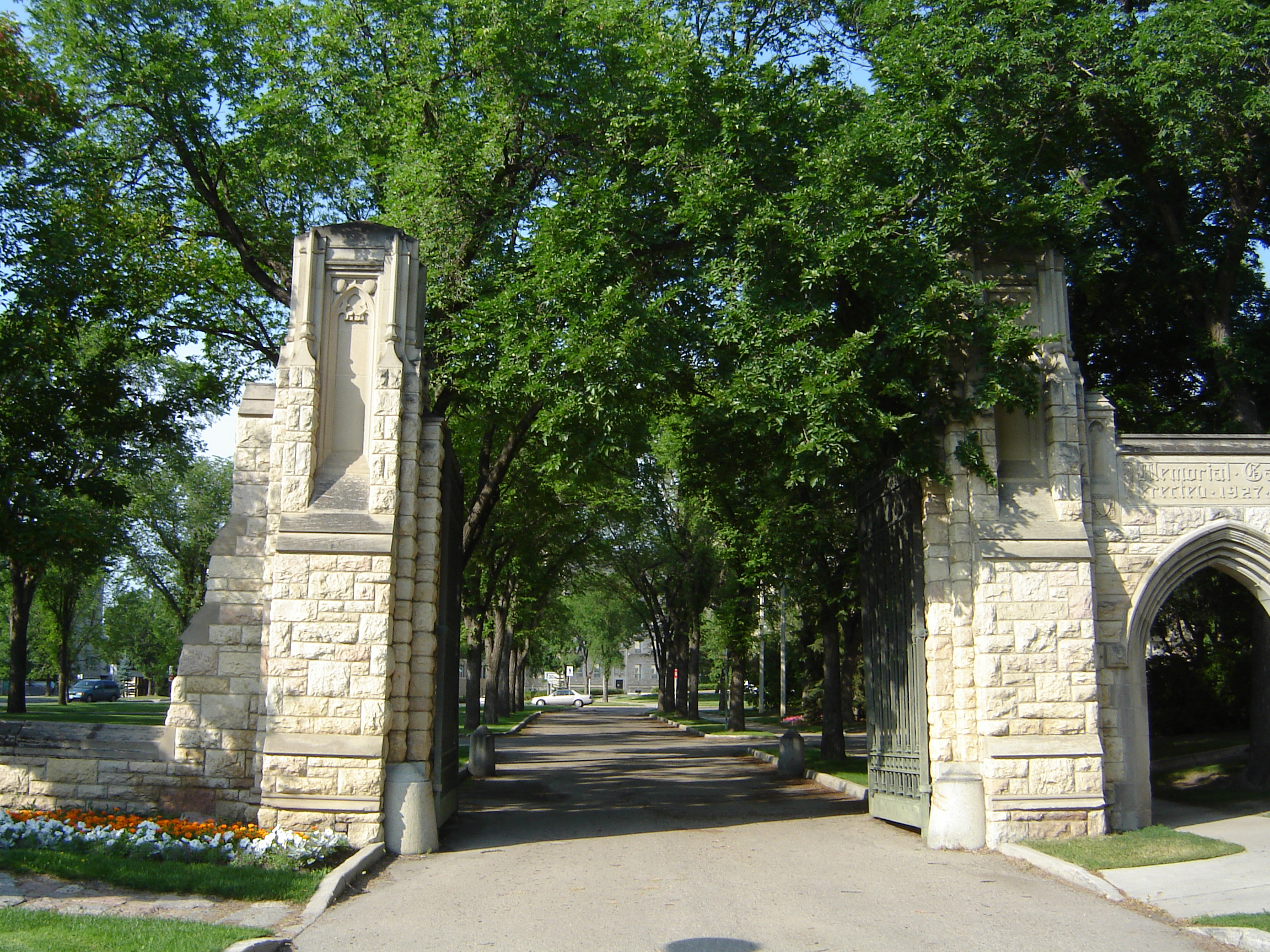
U of SListing of those who gave their lives in the great war Memorial Gates Saskatoon

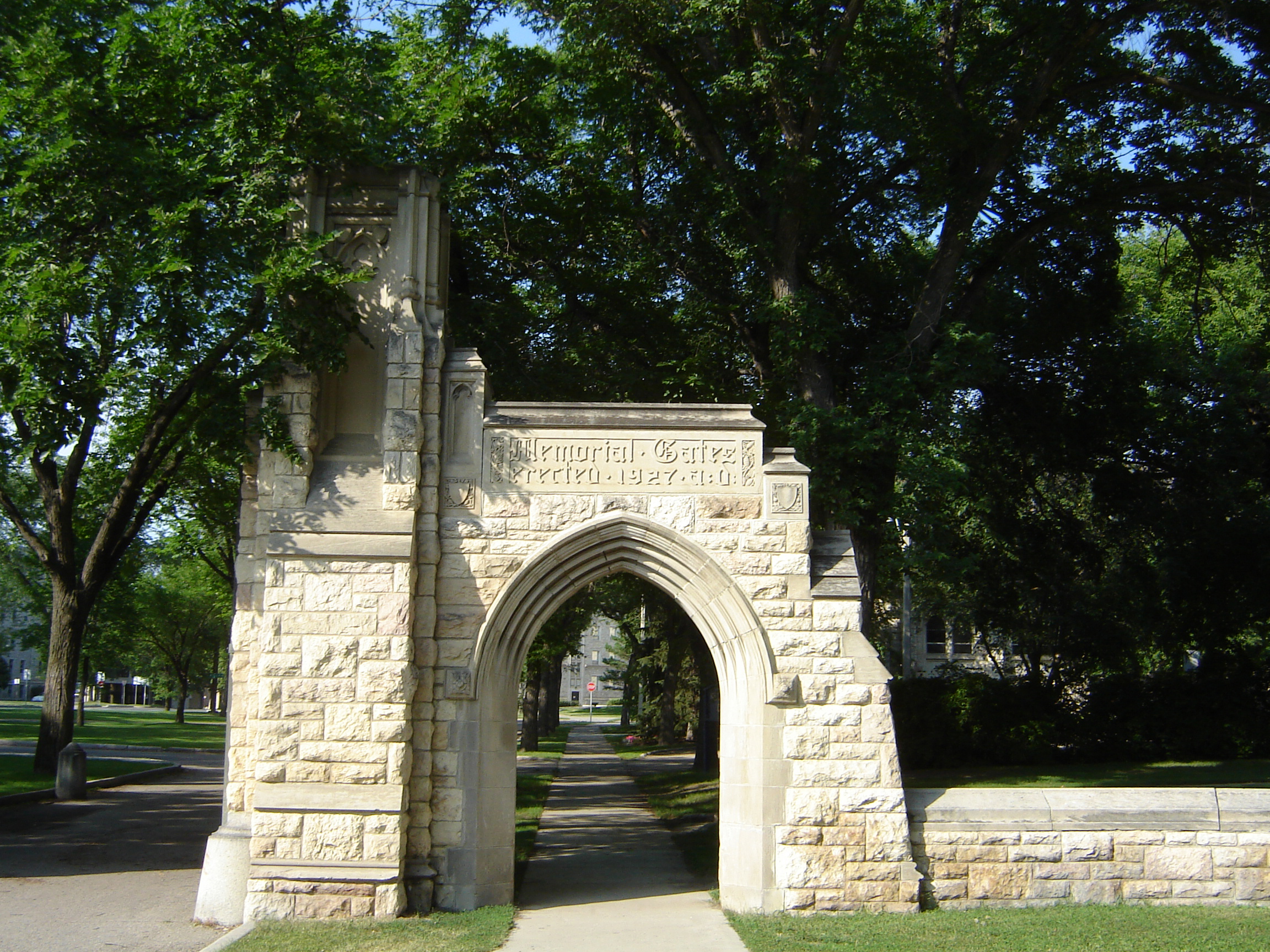
U of S Erection date Memorial Gates Saskatoon

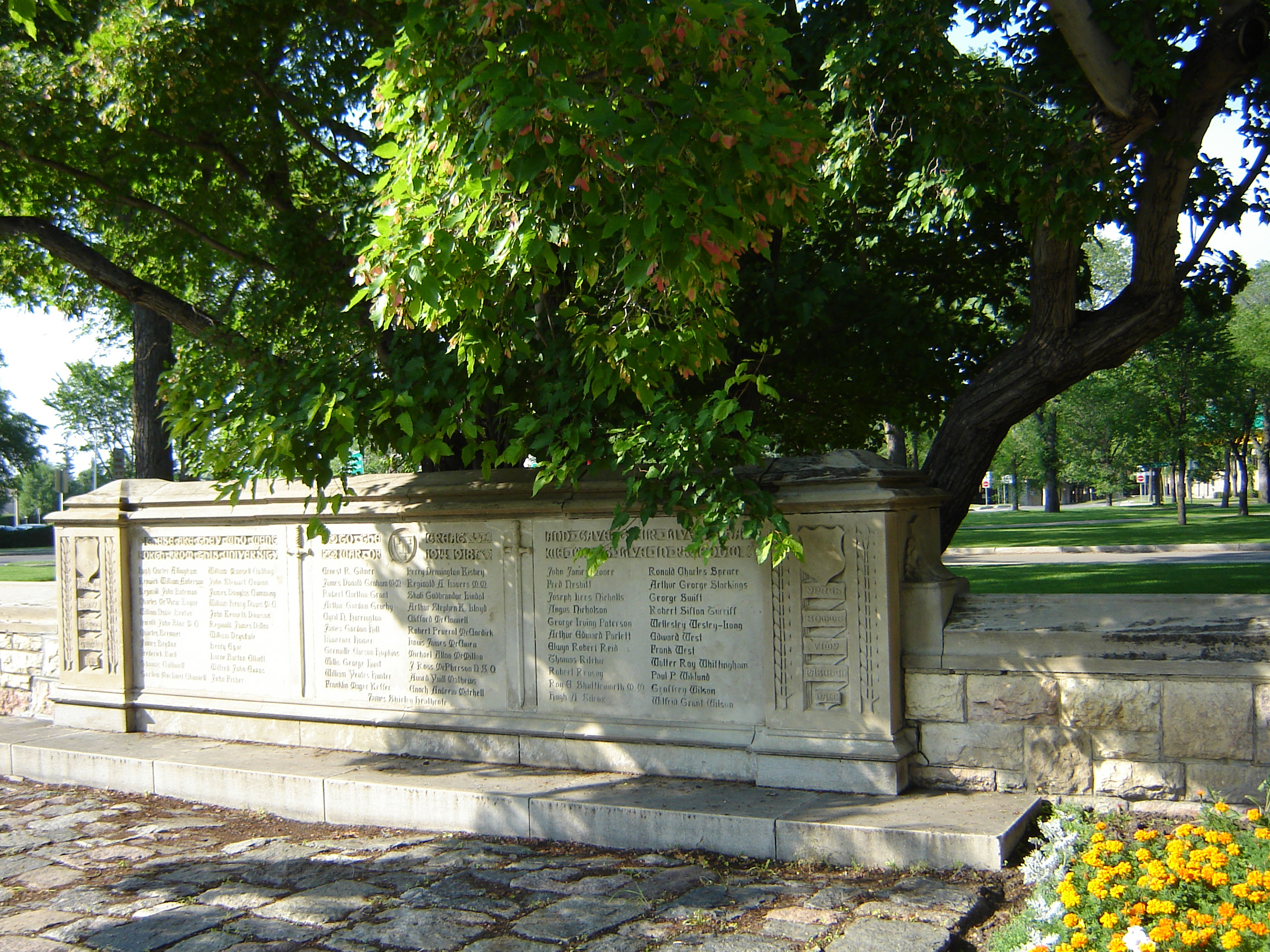
U of SListing of those who gave their lives in the great war Memorial Gates Saskatoon

Memorial Gates are a military memorial which are part of the University of Saskatchewan, in Saskatoon, Saskatchewan. These Gates were originally the entrance gates to the university campus and flanked University Drive. In the 1980s, due to increased traffic to the southwest portion of the campus, primarily Royal University Hospital, a new road entrance was built to the west. The gates remain, with the remnant of University Drive passing through them renamed Memorial Crescent. The gates are now primarily used by pedestrians, though the roadway is open to vehicles.

== Listing of those alumni who gave their lives in the Great War ==
These are they who went forth from this university to the Great War 1914–1918 and gave their lives that we might live in freedom

Hugh Carter Allingham	William Mansell Codling
Renwick William Anderson	John Stewart Cowan
Reginald John Bateman	James Douglas cumming
Charles McVicar Boyne	John Kenneth Dawson
Harold John Blair M.C.	Reginald James Dillan
Charles Bremner	William Drysdale
James Brydon	Henry Egar
Frederick Burd	Lorne Burton Elliott
Thomas Caldwell	Wilfred John Evans
Gordon Mortimer Channell	John Pisher
Ernest R. Gilmer	Perry Dennington Kisbey
James Donald Graham M.M.	Reginald A. Lovers M.M.
Robert Carlion Grant	Shuli Gudbrandur Lindal
Arthur Gordon Gruchy	Arthur Stephen K. Lloyd
Cyril N. Harrington	Clifford McConnell
James Gordon Hill	Robert Peveral McClordick
Lawrence Homer	Louis James McCuien
Grenville Carson Hopkins	Michael Allan McMillan
Willis George Hunt	J. Ross McPherson D.S.O.
William Yrides Hunter	Auned Yuil Mathews
Franklin Mager Keffer	Enoch Andrew Mitchell
James Shirley Heathcote
John James Moore	Ronald Charles Spence
Fred Nesbitt	Arthur George Slarkings
Joseph Lees Nicholls	George Swift
Angus Nicholson	Robert Sifton Turriff
George Irving Paterson	Wellesley Wesley-Long
Arthur Edward Parlett	Edward West
Elwyn Robert Reid	Frank West
Thomas Ritchie	Walter Ray Whittingham
Robert Rensay	Paul P Wiklun
Roy E. Shuttleworth M.M.	Geoffrey Wilson
Hugh A. Silcox	Wilfrid Grant Wilson

- Ypres
- Somme
- Vimy
- Paschendale

== Erection Date ==
Memorial Gates erected 1927 a.d.

== Ashes ==
The ashes of Frederick W. A. G. Haultain were scattered at the gates.

== Nearby ==
- College Building (Saskatchewan)
- Rugby Chapel
- Victoria One Room School house
- St. Andrew's College
- Royal University Hospital
