= Praça do Comércio =

Plaza in Lisbon, Portugal

- Plaza
- Nickname: Terreiro do Paço
- Praça do Comércio seen from the Tagus river
- Area: approx. 30,600 m^{2} (329,000 sq ft)
- Location: Lisbon, Estremadura, Portugal
- Interactive map of Praça do Comércio
- Coordinates: 38°42′27″N 9°8′11″W

The Praça do Comércio (Portuguese pronunciation: [ˈpɾasɐ ðu kuˈmɛɾsju]; transl. Commerce Square), more commonly known in Portuguese as Terreiro do Paço ([tɨˈʁɐjɾu ðu ˈpasu] (transl. Palace Yard), is a large, harbour-facing plaza in Portugal's capital, Lisbon, and is one of the largest in Portugal, with an area of 175 by 175 m (574 by 574 ft), that is, 30,600 m^{2} (329,000 ft^{2}).

Facing the Tagus river to the south, the square hosted Ribeira Palace, the King of Portugal's residence, until the latter was destroyed by the great 1755 Lisbon earthquake. Terreiro do Paço metro station is located beneath the plaza.

After the earthquake, the plaza was completely remodeled as part of the rebuilding of the Pombaline Downtown (Baixa), ordered by Sebastião José de Carvalho e Melo, 1st Marquis of Pombal, who was (chief) Minister of Portugal from 1750 to 1777, during the reign of the Portuguese King José I. From the 19th century onwards, Praça do Comércio became the seat of some of the most important Portuguese state departments, including the Ministries of Finances, Internal Administration, Agriculture and Maritime Affairs; before the Carnation Revolution (1974) and the creation of a unified Ministry of Defence, it was also the location of the War and Navy Ministries, as well as the old Ministry of Colonies (up to 1967), and thus also became a metonym for the Portuguese central government. Also housed there is the Supreme Court. In June 1910, just a few months before the establishment of the Portuguese Republic, Praça do Comércio was classified as a National Monument of Portugal.

== History ==
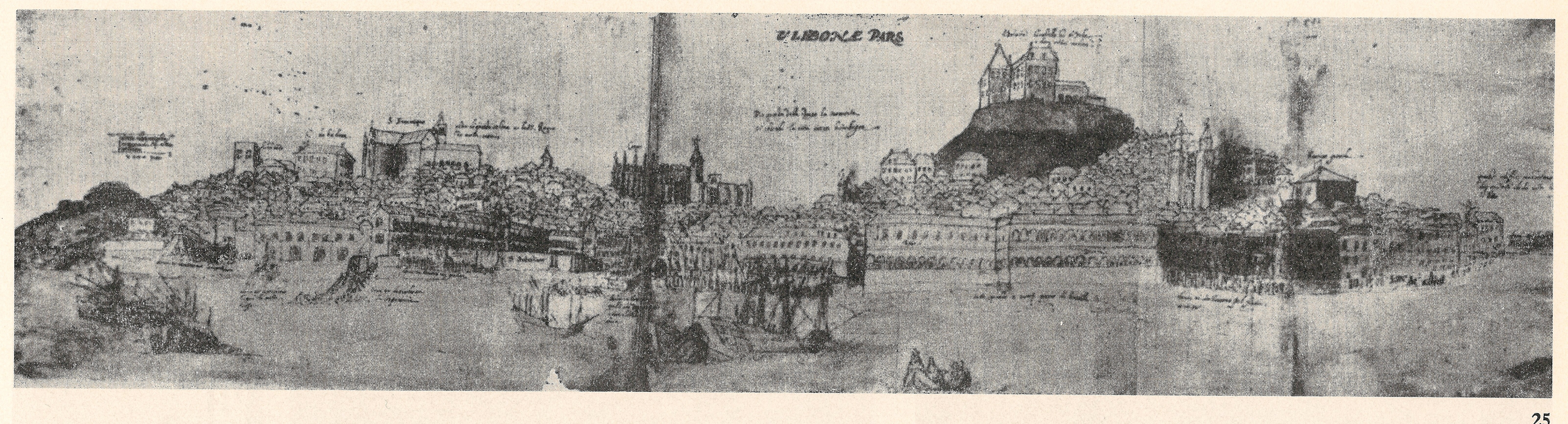
Terreiro do Paço in 1575

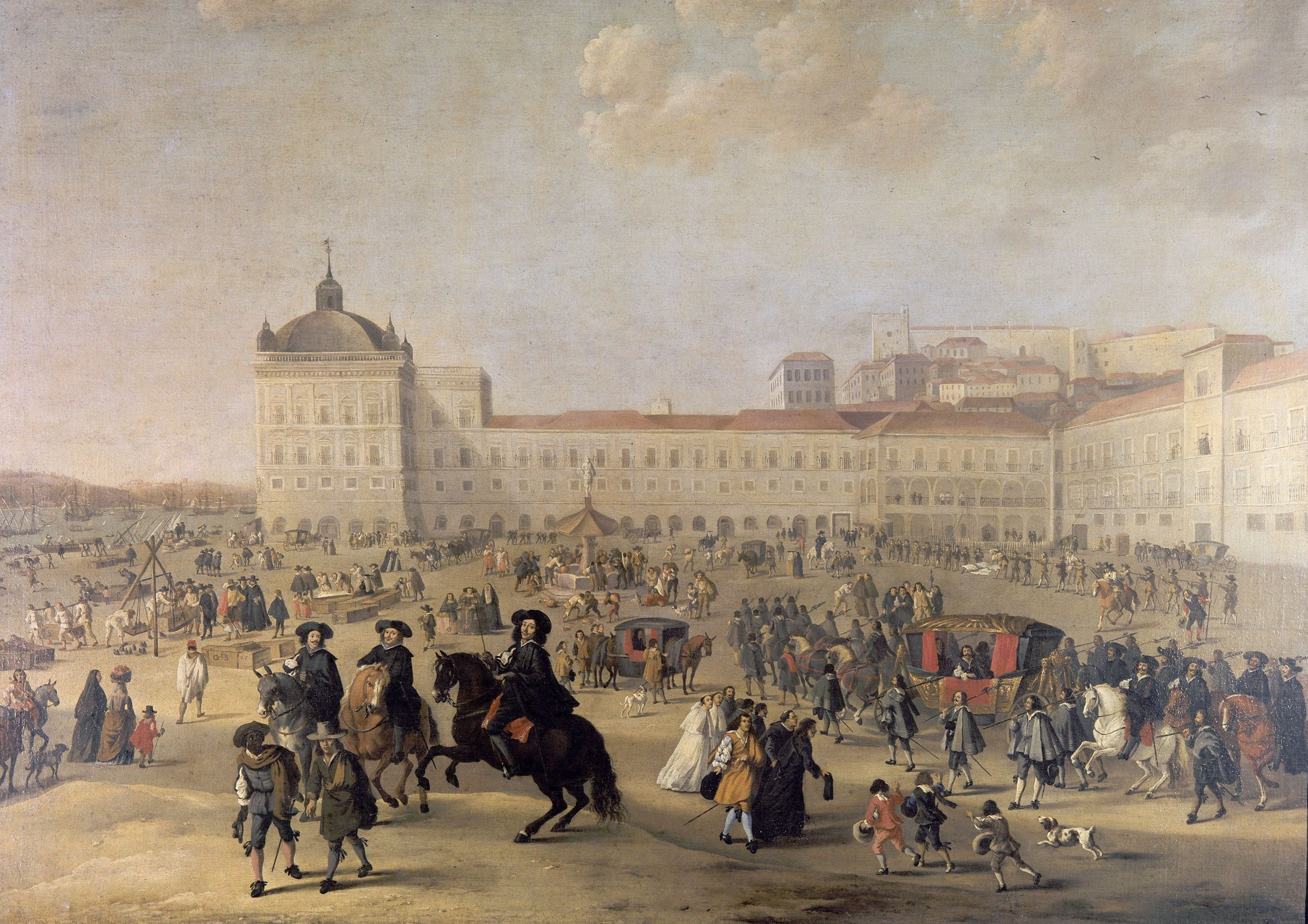
Terreiro do Paço in 1662, by Dirk Stoop

Urban development of the banks of the Tagus river (the Ribeira) was given firm impulse in the early 16th century, when King Manuel I built a new royal residence – the Ribeira Palace – by the river, outside the city walls. The area was further developed with the building of a port, shipbuilding facilities (the Ribeira das Naus), the Casa da Índia and other administrative buildings that regulated the commerce between Portugal and other parts of Europe and its colonies in Africa, Asia and the Americas.

Statue of José I of Portugal, by Machado de Castro (1775). The king on his horse is symbolically crushing snakes on his path.

On 1 November 1755, during the reign of King José I, a great earthquake followed by a tsunami and fire destroyed most of Lisbon, including the Ribeira Palace and other buildings by the river. José I's Prime Minister, the Marquis of Pombal, coordinated a massive rebuilding effort led by Portuguese architect Eugénio dos Santos. He designed a large, rectangular square in the shape of a "U", open towards the Tagus. The buildings have galleries on their ground floors, and the arms of the "U" end in two large towers, reminiscent of the monumental tower of the destroyed Ribeira Palace, still vivid in the architectural memory of the city. His plan was realised almost completely, although decorative details were changed and the east tower of the square and the Augusta Street Arch were only finished in the 19th century. This triumphal arch was designed by the Portuguese architect Santos de Carvalho and was completed in 1873. The top section includes statues representing important Portuguese figures such as Vasco da Gama and the Marquis of Pombal.

The square was named Praça do Comércio, the Square of Commerce, to indicate its new function in the economy of Lisbon. The symmetrical buildings of the square were filled with government bureaux regulating customs and port activities. The centrepiece of the ensemble was the equestrian statue of King José I, inaugurated in 1775 in the centre of the square. This bronze statue, the first monumental statue dedicated to a king in Lisbon, was designed by Joaquim Machado de Castro, Portugal's foremost sculptor of the time.

Rua Augusta Arch

Opening towards Augusta Street, which links the square with the other traditional Lisbon square, the Rossio, the original project by Eugénio dos Santos planned a triumphal arch, only realised in 1875. This arch, usually called the Rua Augusta Arch, was designed by Veríssimo da Costa. It has a clock and statues of Glory, Ingenuity and Valor (by the French sculptor Calmels) and those of Viriatus, Nuno Álvares Pereira, Vasco da Gama and, of course, the Marquis of Pombal.

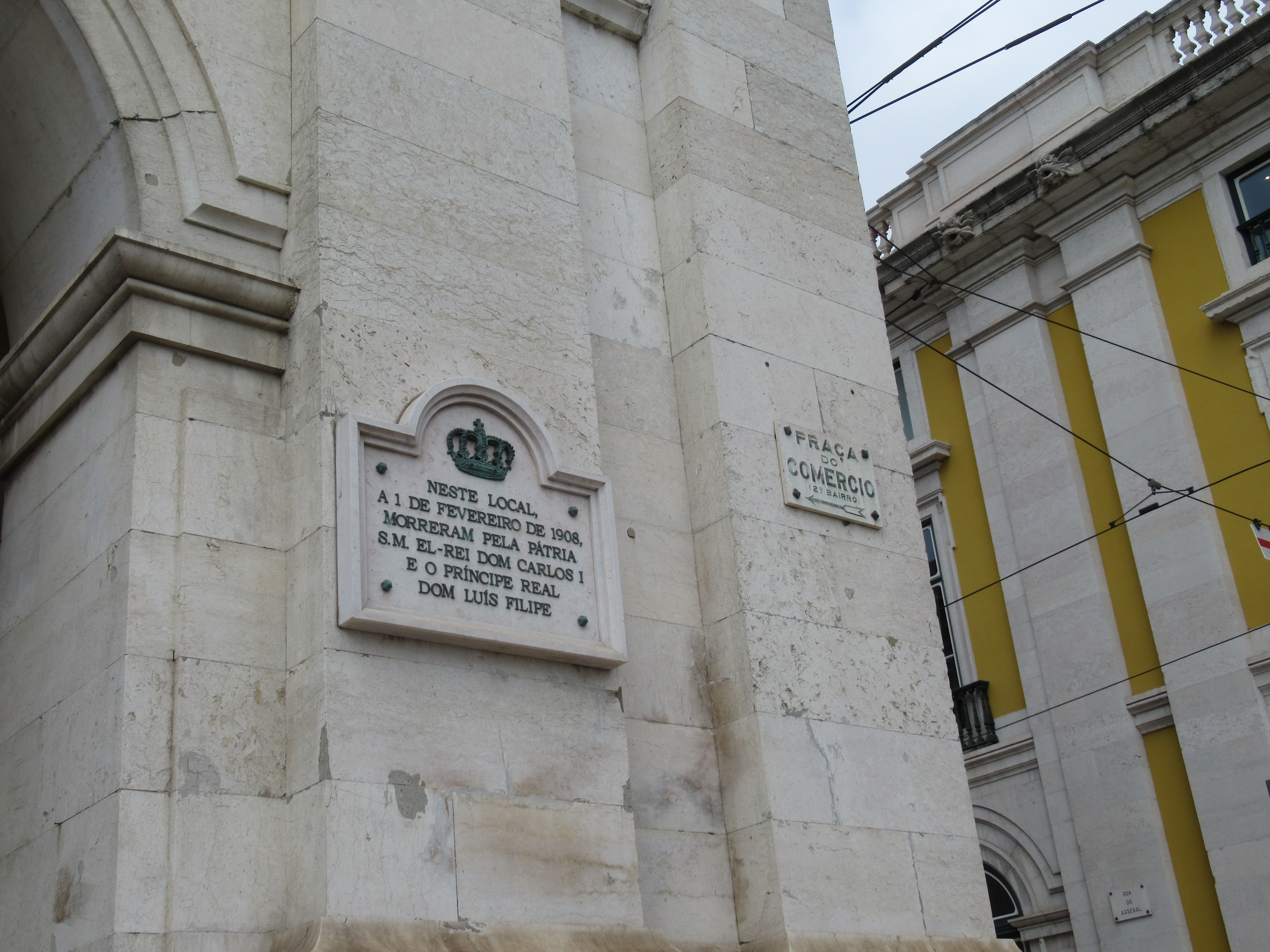
Regicide plaque marking the place where the Lisbon Regicide happened

On 1 February 1908, the square was the scene of the assassination of Carlos I, the penultimate King of Portugal. On their way back from the palace of Vila Viçosa to the royal palace in Lisbon, the carriage containing Carlos I and his family passed through the Terreiro do Paço. While crossing the square, shots were fired from the crowd by at least two men: Alfredo Luís da Costa and Manuel Buíça. The king died immediately, his heir Luís Filipe was mortally wounded, and Prince Manuel was hit in the arm. The assassins were shot on the spot by police and later recognized as members of the Republican Party – which two years later overthrew the Portuguese monarchy.

The wealth of Portugal was channeled through this plaza and port. It serves as not only a transportation hub but also as a hub for commercial businesses, having two main directions of travel, west and south. The northern side tram leads to the district of Belem and the southern port is a ferry that goes across the River Tagus.

The destruction of the palace led to the loss of the greatest archive of Portuguese literature. The library housed over 200,000 books. The reconstruction took around a century to go from plans to finished construction.

At the southern end of the plaza at the water's edge was a grand marble staircase meant for the arrival of royal dignitaries. These steps date to before the 1755 earthquake and would have led straight into the royal palace.

On June 10, the day of Portugal, the plaza is full of military and residents who celebrate the day.

The plaza is home to the oldest café in the city, Martinho da Arcada (established 1782). It also houses the monumental Pousada Hotel.

The western tower of the square (where once stood the Navy and the Colonies Ministries), houses the Baixa's location of the Museum of Lisbon.

It is part of the parish of Santa Maria Maior. Before 2013 it was part of Madalena and São Nicolau.

== See also ==
- Pombaline Downtown
- Ribeira Palace
- Casa da Índia
- Rossio
- Praça da Figueira

== Gallery ==
Equestrian statue of José I, by Joaquim Machado de Castro (1775), and the Rua Augusta Arch

Equestrian statue of José I. The king on horseback symbolically crushes snakes in his path.

View from the Rua Augusta Arch

Western wing

Arcades
