= Célestin Anatole Calmels =

French sculptor

Célestin Anatole Calmels ComC ComSE
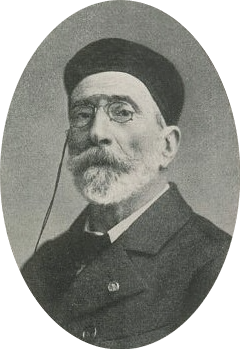
- Born: 26 March 1822; Paris, France
- Died: 23 March 1906 (aged 83); Lisbon, Portugal
- Known for: Sculpture
- Notable work: Glory Crowning Genius and Valor (1873)
- Awards: Prix de Rome, 2nd Prize (1839)

Célestin-Anatole Calmels ComC ComSE (26 March 1822 – 23 March 1906) was a French sculptor who worked in Portugal, one of the most prominent sculptors in Lisbon of his day.

Among his most notable works are the allegorical sculptures atop the Rua Augusta Arch, Glory Crowning Genius and Valor, as well as the pediment of Lisbon City Hall, the equestrian statue of King Peter IV in Porto, the allegorical statues of Labour and Strength in the portal of the Palace of the Dukes of Palmela in Lisbon, and sculptures in the Mausoleum of the Dukes of Palmela in Prazeres Cemetery.

== Honours ==
- Commander of the Order of Christ, Portugal
- Commander of the Order of Saint James of the Sword, Portugal
