= Rua Augusta Arch =

Arch-like historical building in Lisbon, Portugal

- Portuguese: Arco da Rua Augusta
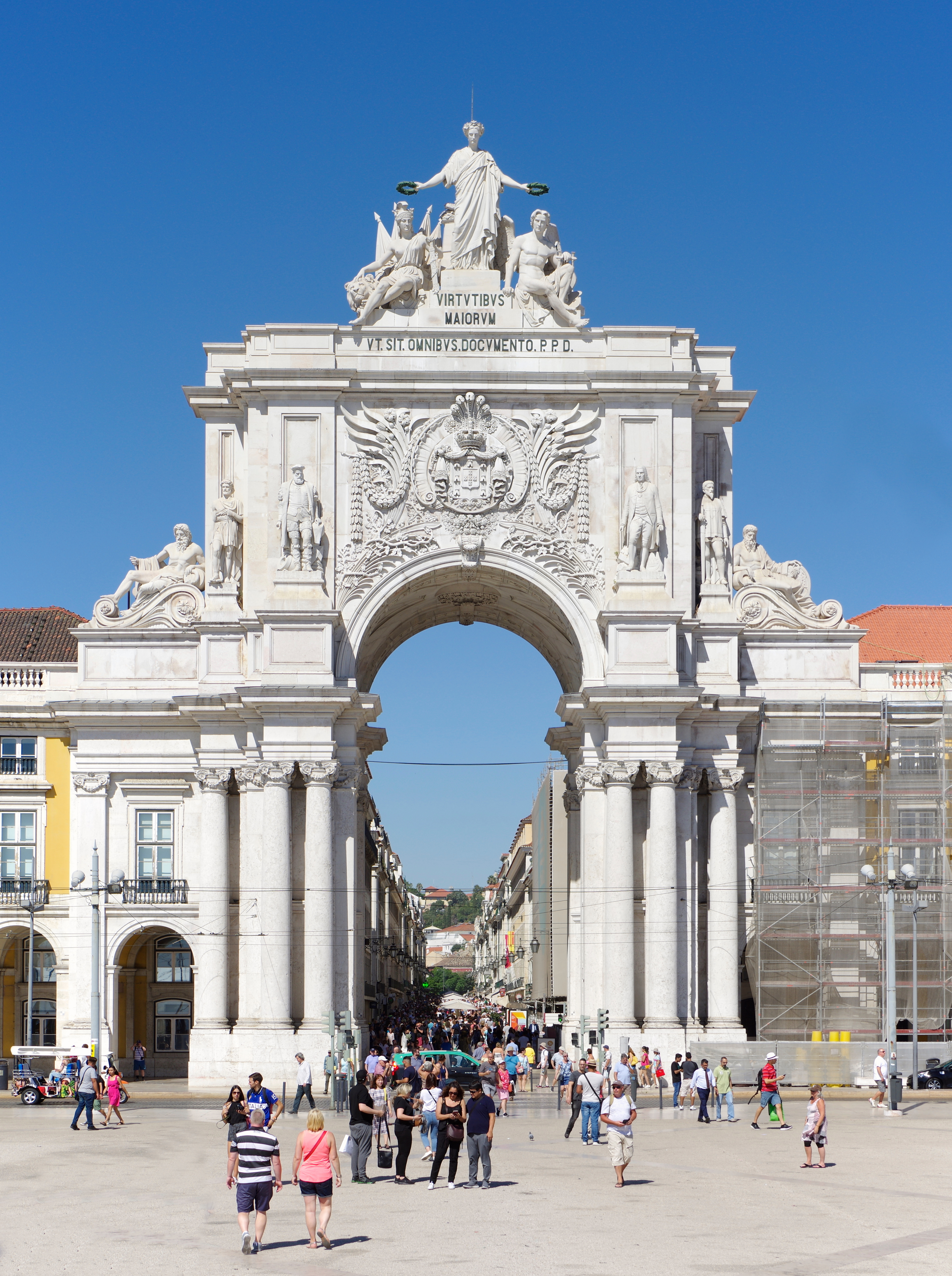
- The arch seen from Praça do Comércio

General information
- Type: Memorial arch
- Location: Lisbon, Portugal
- Coordinates: 38.7084°N 9.1368°W
- Construction started: 1755
- Completed: 1873

The Rua Augusta Arch (Portuguese: Arco da Rua Augusta) is a stone, triumphal arch and visitor attraction in Lisbon, Portugal, on the Praça do Comércio. It was built to commemorate the city's reconstruction after the 1755 earthquake. It has six columns (some 11 metres (36 feet) high) and is adorned with statues of various historical figures. The significant height from the arch crown to the cornice imparts an appearance of heaviness to the structure. The associated space is filled with the coat of arms of Portugal. The allegorical group at the top, made by French sculptor Célestin Anatole Calmels, represents Glory rewarding Valor and Genius.

Originally designed as a bell tower, the building was ultimately transformed into an elaborate arch after more than a century.

== Features ==
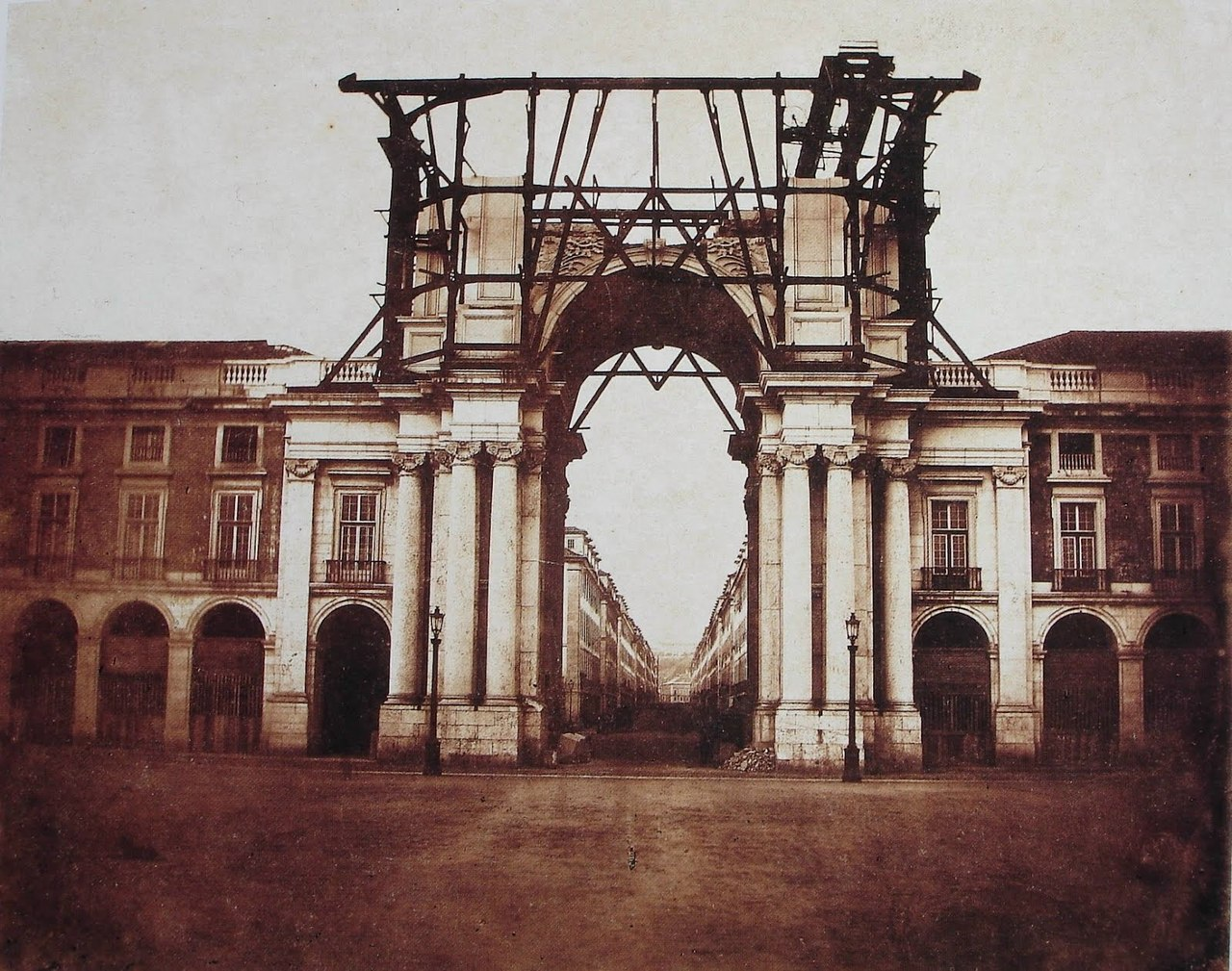
Rua Augusta Arch during construction, photographed by Czech artist Václav Cífka, c. 1862–1873

Because of the top cornice's great height (over 100 feet/30 m), the figures above it had to be made colossal. The female allegory of Glory, which is dressed in peplos and measures 23 feet (7.0 m), stands on a three-step throne and holds two crowns. Valor is personified by an amazon, partially covered with chlamys and wearing a high-crested helmet with dragon patterns, which were the symbols of the House of Braganza. Her left hand holds the parazonium, with a trophy of flags behind. The Genius encompasses a statue of Jupiter behind his left arm. On his left side are the attributes of writing and arts.

The four statues over the columns, made by Victor Bastos, represent Nuno Alvares Pereira and Sebastião José de Carvalho e Melo, Marquis of Pombal on the right, and Vasco da Gama and Viriatus on the left. The two recumbent figures represent the rivers Tagus and Douro. The arch holds these figures to represent Portuguese history and show their dominance by incorporating a triumphal arch, as they were victoriously rebuilding the city from the damage.

It appeared as the arch through which the Lilliputians wheeled Lemuel Gulliver in the 1996 miniseries Gulliver's Travels.

== See also ==
- List of post-Roman triumphal arches

== Gallery ==
Façade facing Praça do Comércio

Façade facing Rua Augusta

View of the clock-side façade from MUDE – Museu do Design

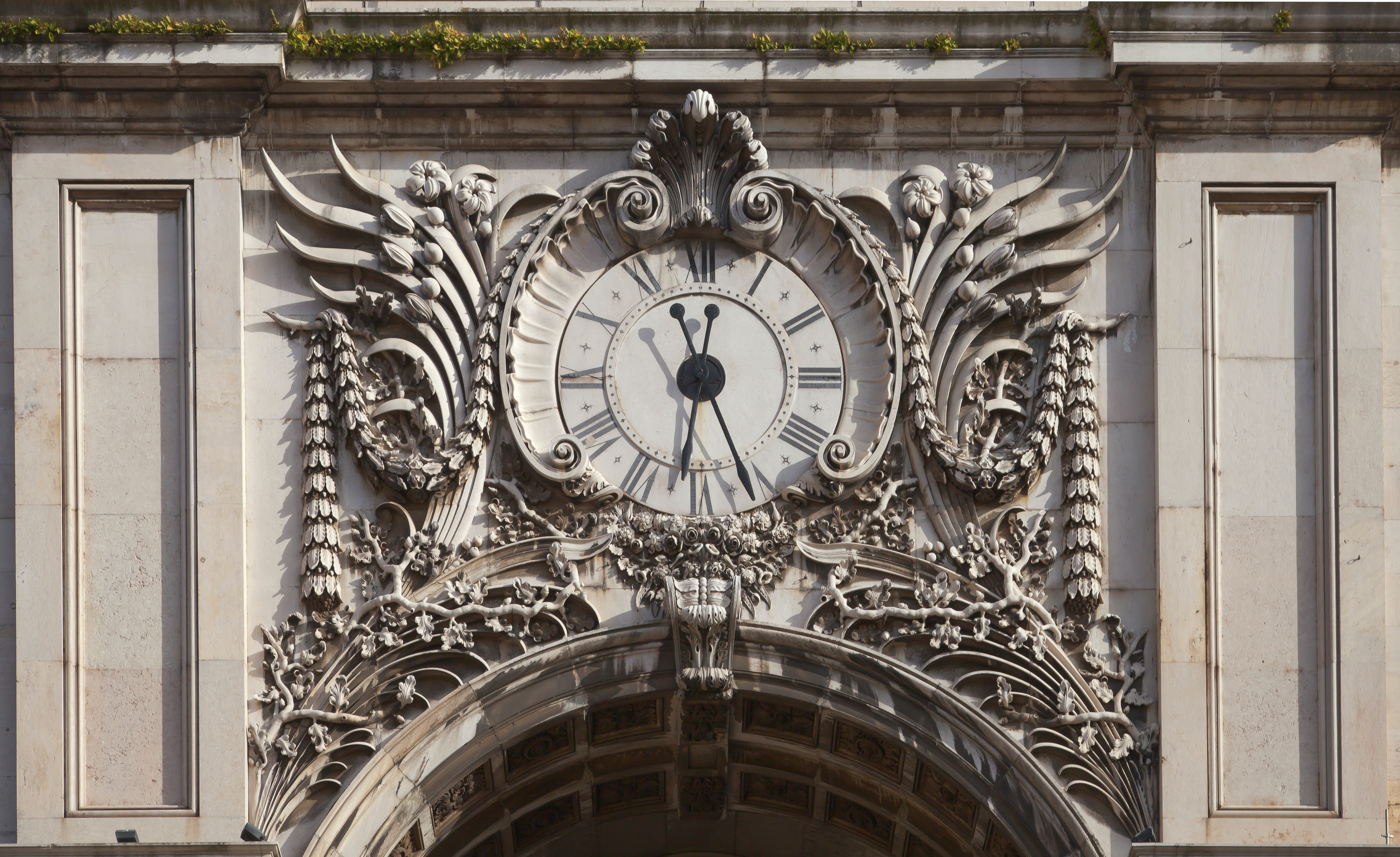
Clock

Allegorical figure of Genius

Allegorical figure of Valor with a lion

Praça do Comércio and the Tagus viewed from the top of the arch

Rua Augusta viewed from the top of the arch
