= Joaquim Machado de Castro =

Joaquim Machado de Castro CvC
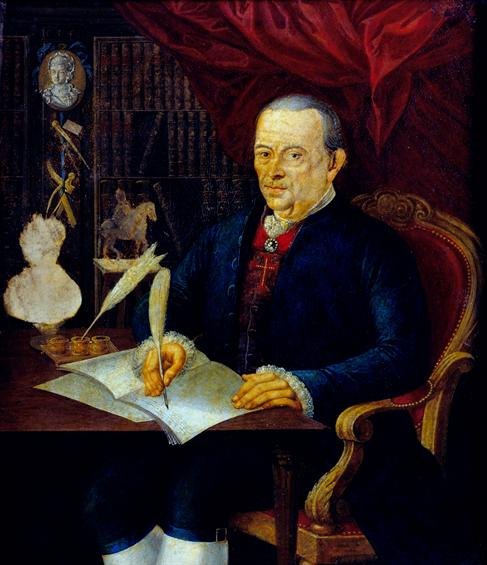
- Portrait of the Master Sculptor Joaquim Machado de Castro
- Born: 19 June 1731; Coimbra, Portugal
- Died: 17 November 1822 (aged 91); Mártires, Lisbon, Portugal
- Known for: Sculpture
- Patrons: Joseph I of Portugal

Joaquim Machado de Castro (19 June 1731 – 17 November 1822) was one of Portugal's foremost sculptors. He wrote extensively on his works and the theory behind them, including a full-length discussion of the statue of King Joseph I entitled Descripção analytica da execução da estatua equestre, Lisbon 1810.

== Life ==
Machado de Castro was born in Coimbra, and was a celebrated figure throughout Europe in the eighteenth and early nineteenth centuries. He was the older stepbrother of organist Antonio Machado e Cerveira, to the latter's benefit in navigating social and political life. Machado de Castro became active in Lisbon's reconstruction following the earthquake of 1755. As an artist, he was self-taught.

The Descripção is the artist's detailed comments on the style and execution of his finest work, the equestrian statue of D. José I, erected in 1775 as part of the rebuilding of central Lisbon after the disastrous earthquake of 1755. The project had been approved by Sebastião José de Carvalho e Melo, the Marquis of Pombal, in 1759, but Machado de Castro only accepted the commission in 1770, after the artist Eugénio dos Santos left the project unfinished. The stages of construction are illustrated with sections and cross-sections of the horse and rider, views of the statue from different angles, and details of armor and ornamentation. This bronze statue remains one of Lisbon's most important monuments, and dominates one of the major squares of Europe, the Praça do Comércio or Terreiro do Paço. In the introduction, Machado de Castro comments on similar works of art in the rest of Europe.

Machado de Castro had a famous school and was the Master of many sculptors. He died in Lisbon. In Coimbra there is a prestigious art museum named in his honour, the Machado de Castro National Museum.
