= College Building =

College Building may refer to:

- Peter MacKinnon Building, formerly College Building, at the University of Saskatchewan in Canada
- Wren Building, formerly College Building, at the College of William and Mary in Virginia, United States
