= Politics of drug abuse =

Most countries have legislation designed to criminalise some drug use. Usually however the legislative process is self-referential, defining abuse in terms of what is made illegal. The legislation concerns lists of drugs specified by the legislation. These drugs are often called illegal drugs but, generally, what is illegal is their unlicensed production, supply and possession. The drugs are also called controlled drugs or controlled substances.

== World Health Organization ==
=== Definitions of drug abuse and drug addiction ===
The manner in which the World Health Organization (WHO) has recognized and dealt with 'drug abuse' over the years reflects a continuing struggle to reconcile conflicting historical, political, social, cultural, and medical viewpoints.

In its early reports, the WHO Expert Committee on addiction-producing Drugs used the terms 'abuse' and 'addiction' interchangeably. Beginning in the 1950s, attempts were made to distinguish between scientific and emotionally charged terminology. However, the term 'abuse' was still inserted into definitions of addiction and dependency.

In 1957, while not explicitly saying that 'drug abuse' was synonymous with 'addiction', the committee first attempted to clarify existing definitions of addiction and habituation as had been in common parlance since at least 1931:

Drug addiction is a state of periodic or chronic intoxication produced by the repeated consumption of a drug (natural or synthetic). Its characteristics include: (i) an overpowering desire or need (compulsion) to continue taking the drug and to obtain it by any means; (ii) a tendency to increase the dose; (iii) a psychic (psychological) and generally a physical dependence on the effects of the drug; and (iv) detrimental effects on the individual and on society.

Drug habituation (habit) is a condition resulting from the repeated consumption of a drug. Its characteristics include (i) a desire (but not a compulsion) to continue taking the drug for the sense of improved well-being which it engenders; (ii) little or no tendency to increase the dose; (iii) some degree of psychic dependence on the effect of the drug, but absence of physical dependence and hence of an abstinence syndrome [withdrawal], and (iv) detrimental effects, if any, primarily on the individual.

In 1964, a new WHO committee found these definitions to be inadequate, and suggested using the blanket term 'drug dependence':

The definition of addiction gained some acceptance, but confusion in the use of the terms addiction and habituation and misuse of the former continued. Further, the list of drugs abused increased in number and diversity. These difficulties have become increasingly apparent and various attempts have been made to find a term that could be applied to drug abuse generally. The component in common appears to be dependence, whether psychic or physical or both. Hence, use of the term 'drug dependence', with a modifying phase linking it to a particular drug type in order to differentiate one class of drugs from another, had been given most careful consideration. The Expert Committee recommends substitution of the term 'drug dependence' for the terms 'drug addiction' and 'drug habituation'. (emphasis added)

The committee did not clearly define dependence, but did go on to clarify that there was a distinction between physical and psychological ('psychic') dependence. It said that drug abuse was "a state of psychic dependence or physical dependence, or both, on a drug, arising in a person following administration of that drug on a periodic or continued basis." Psychic dependence was defined as a state in which "there is a feeling of satisfaction and psychic drive that requires periodic or continuous administration of the drug to produce pleasure or to avoid discomfort" and all drugs were said to be capable of producing this state:

There is scarcely any agent which can be taken into the body to which some individuals will not get a reaction satisfactory or pleasurable to them, persuading them to continue its use even to the point of abuse — that is, to excessive or persistent use beyond medical need. (emphasis added)

This is believed to be the first reference to "medical need" as a factor in the distinction between use and abuse.

In 1965, the same WHO committee commented further, now providing a specific definition of abuse:

Drug abuse is the consumption of a drug apart from medical need or in unnecessary quantities. Its nature and significance may be considered from two points of view: one relates to the interaction between the drug and the individual, the other to the interaction between drug abuse and society. The first viewpoint is concerned with drug dependence and the interplay between the pharmacodynamic actions of the drug and the physiological and psychological status of the individual. The second — the interaction between drug abuse and society — is concerned with the interplay of a wide range of conditions, environmental, sociological, and economic.

Individuals may become dependent upon a wide variety of chemical substances that produce central nervous system effects ranging from stimulation to depression. All of these drugs have one effect in common: they are capable of creating, in certain individuals, a particular state of mind that is termed "psychic dependence ".

Some drugs… induce physical dependence, which is an adaptive state that manifests itself by intense physical disturbances when the administration of the drug is suspended or when its action is affected by the administration of a specific antagonist.

The committee offered several disclaimers of its definitions:

It must be emphasized that drug dependence and drug abuse, as used by the Committee, are general terms and carry no connotation of the degree of risk to public health or of the need for drug control or for a particular type of drug control. The Committee would point out again that the recommendation for the use of the terms drug abuse and drug dependence of this or that type must not be regarded as a re-definition; rather, these terms are intended as descriptive expressions for clarification in scientific reference, interdisciplinary discussions, and national and international procedures.

The 1969 edition of the WHO's International Statistical Classification of Diseases and Related Health Problems (ICD) manual defined drug abuse as "persistent or sporadic excessive drug use inconsistent with or unrelated to acceptable medical practice", modern editions have not used the term because of its ambiguity, preferring instead to refer to the cluster of symptoms previously called 'drug abuse' as 'substance abuse'.

In 1973, these statements and recent legislation based upon the term "dependence" rather than "addiction" or "abuse" were praised by President Richard M. Nixon's National Commission on Marijuana and Drug Abuse in its final report:

The Commission applauds the much-belated attempt by the scientific community to sever its conceptual apparatus from the vocabulary of politics and emotion. "Addiction," like "narcotics" and "drug abuse," has a general connotation of evil, suggesting illicit ecstasy, guilt and sin. Because the public image is conditioned more by cultural perceptions than by medical ones, medically-precise meanings simply cannot be harmonized with common parlance.

And in 1975, the WHO further distanced itself from the term 'drug abuse':

"Drug abuse" is a term in need of some clarification. …The term is really a convenient, but not very precise, way of indicating that (1) an unspecified drug is being used in an unspecified manner and amount … and (2) such use has been judged by some person or group to be wrong (illegal or immoral) and/or harmful to the user or society, or both. What might be called "drug abuse" by some would not necessarily be considered so by others. … For these reasons, the term "drug abuse" is avoided here

The World Health Organization presently prefers to use the terms harmful use and hazardous use (of drugs), in order to distinguish between the health effects of drug abuse rather than the social consequences. Another preferred term is drug misuse, defined as the "use of a substance for a purpose not consistent with legal or medical guidelines, as in the non-medical use of prescription medications." According to WHO, the term misuse is preferred by some in the belief that it is less judgmental.

However, the 1957 and 1964–1965 WHO definitions of addiction, dependence and drug abuse persist to the present day in medical literature and have become entrenched in global legislation, despite the disclaimers and reliance on contentious assumptions. The WHO itself continues to use 'drug abuse' in its publications, and uses the term 'abuse' consistently and exclusively when discussing the control and consumption of illegal substances. This is in keeping with guidelines issued by the WHO's parent organization, the United Nations, which discourages any recognition of "recreational" or "responsible" use of drugs.

Researchers may take note that somewhat less contentious definitions of addiction, dependence, and tolerance (with no speculation as to their roles in the definition of drug abuse) were jointly issued in 2001 by the American Academy of Pain Medicine, the American Pain Society, and the American Society of Addiction Medicine in the publication "Definitions Related to the Use of Opioids for the Treatment of Pain".
