= Carl L. von Baeyer =

Canadian psychologist, academic, and author

- Born: Switzerland
- Occupations: Psychologist, academic, and author
- Awards: Outstanding Pain Mentorship Award, Canadian Pain Society (2010); Jeffrey Lawson Award for Advocacy in Children's Pain Relief, American Pain Society (2017)

Academic background
- Education: B.A. M.A. PhD

Carl L. von Baeyer is a Canadian psychologist, academic, and author. He is a professor emeritus of psychology at the University of Saskatchewan.

Von Baeyer is most known for his work on the assessment and relief of pain in children. He was awarded the 2017 Jeffrey Lawson Award for Advocacy in Children's Pain Relief from the American Pain Society. His authored works include publications in academic journals such as Pain and The Journal of Pain as well as book chapters. Von Baeyer is a Fellow of the Canadian Psychological Association. He has explored and advocated for the benefits and feasibility of a shared parenting arrangement where both parents work part-time while also spending time at home with their children.

== Education ==
Von Baeyer completed a BA in psychology in 1971 at the University of British Columbia, followed by an MA in 1974 and PhD in 1978 at the University of Waterloo in clinical psychology. His predoctoral internship in clinical psychology was at Duke University Hospital in Durham, North Carolina.

== Career ==
Von Baeyer joined the faculty of the University of Saskatchewan in Saskatoon in 1978, assuming various positions. His noteworthy roles included terms as Director of Clinical Psychology Training for the PhD program and chair of the Behavioural Sciences Research Ethics Board.

At Royal University Hospital in Saskatoon, von Baeyer founded and directed the Internship (Residency) Training in Clinical Psychology from 1982 to 1989 and helped to pioneer the Pediatric Complex Pain Clinic Pilot Project in 2009.

Additionally, from 2002 he served as one of five co-principal investigators and co-founders of Pain in Child Health, an international training initiative in health research funded by the Canadian Institutes of Health Research. He was Editor of Pediatric Pain Letter from 2005 to 2014. He was a member of the Council of the Special Interest Group on Pain in Childhood, International Association for the Study of Pain, from 2001 to 2017.

After retirement as Professor Emeritus from the University of Saskatchewan he moved from Saskatoon to Winnipeg. There he co-chaired the Pediatric Pain Interdisciplinary Interest Group at the Children's Hospital, Health Sciences Centre, Winnipeg, from 2013 to 2017.

== Research ==
Von Baeyer has authored or co-authored over 120 research articles. His works have been cited over 18,000 times according to Google Scholar.

His most widely-cited conclusion is: "Describing pain only in terms of its intensity is like describing music only in terms of its loudness." He explains that pain intensity scores are inherently an oversimplification: they neglect features such as the location, sensory quality, and affective and cognitive aspects of the experience of pain.

In his 1994 research, von Baeyer investigated whether repeated clinical pain measurement affects perceived pain intensity and distress in low-back-pain patients, finding that daily self-monitoring does not significantly alter subjective pain intensity over an 8-day period.

Much of von Baeyer's work has focused on pediatric pain. His 2001 collaborative study introduced and validated the Faces Pain Scale-Revised (FPS-R), a six-face adaptation of the original seven-face FPS for children's pain assessment. It demonstrated a strong correlation with visual analogue and colored analogue scales, suitable for ages 4–12, adhering to a 0–10 metric.

In a 2004 publication, he examined the impact of children's memories of painful experiences on their later reactions to pain and healthcare interventions, discussing developmental, individual, situational, and methodological factors, as well as strategies to mitigate negative consequences.

A systematic review published in 2007 was commissioned by the Initiative on Methods, Measurement, and Pain Assessment in Clinical Trials (IMMPACT). It focused on observational pain scales for children aged 3 to 18. It identified 20 scales, recommended specific ones for acute pain contexts, and suggested further research for chronic pain assessment.

In 2009, he presented validation data supporting the use of the Numerical Rating Scale (NRS) for self-report of pain intensity in children aged 8 years and older, demonstrating functional equivalence with other self-report pain scales like the Faces Pain Scale-Revised (FPS-R) and the Visual Analogue Scale (VAS). Moreover, in 2017, he co-edited a book titled Chronic and Recurrent Pain, which highlighted the prevalence and impact of pediatric chronic pain, discussing various conditions, their consequences, and advocating for improved recognition and treatment strategies to advance understanding and care for affected children.

Von Baeyer's 2018 study investigated the validity and reliability of the Verbal Numerical Rating Scale (VNRS) as a measure of pain intensity in children aged 4 to 17 years, finding strong support for its use in children aged 6 to 17 years but cautioning against its use in those aged 4 and 5 years due to weaker convergent validity. In his 2019 work, he studied clinically significant changes in pain scores among children with painful conditions, using VNRS and FPS-R scales. Taking into account initial pain intensity and patient characteristics, the study offered guidelines for clinical practice and research.

A later work published in 2021 examined the suitability of two alternate simplified pain intensity scales for preschool-aged children, finding that while 3-year-olds struggle with both scales, 4-year-olds demonstrate greater accuracy with the Simplified Concrete Ordinal Scale, suggesting its potential superiority over the Simplified Faces Pain Scale.

== Awards and honors ==
- 2010 – Outstanding Pain Mentorship Award, Canadian Pain Society
- 2017 – Jeffrey Lawson Award for Advocacy in Children's Pain Relief, American Pain Society

== Personal life ==
Von Baeyer was born in Zurich, Switzerland; his family emigrated to Canada when he was one year old. He is a great-grandson of Adolf von Baeyer, who was awarded the Nobel Prize in Chemistry in 1905. His paternal grandfather was Adolf's son de:Hans Ritter von Baeyer, a professor of orthopedic surgery, and his maternal grandfather was de:Ernst Freudenberg, a professor of pediatrics. His father was Hans Jakob von Baeyer (1912–1998) and his mother was Renata (Freudenberg) von Baeyer, 1911–1977. Carl von Baeyer is a brother of Hans Christian von Baeyer, a science writer and Chancellor Professor of Physics at the College of William and Mary.

== Bibliography ==
=== Books ===
- Chronic and Recurrent Pain (2017) ISBN 9783038424161, L.S. Walker & C.L. von Baeyer, eds.

=== Selected most-cited articles ===
- von Baeyer, C. L., Connelly, M. A. Self-report: the primary source in assessment after infancy. Chapter 37 in Stevens, B., et al. (Eds.), Oxford Textbook of Pediatric Pain, 2nd Edition, July 2021. ISBN 9780198818762. Previous version in 1st Edition, 2013.
- Hicks, C. L.; von Baeyer, C. L.; Spafford, P. A.; van Korlaar, I.; Goodenough, B. (2001). "The Faces Pain Scale–Revised: toward a common metric in pediatric pain measurement". Pain. 93 (2): 173–183. doi:10.1016/S0304-3959(01)00314-1. PMID 11427329.
- Jaaniste, T.; Hayes, B.; von Baeyer, C. L. (2007). "Providing children with information about forthcoming medical procedures: A review and synthesis". Clinical Psychology: Science and Practice. 14 (2): 124–143. doi:10.1111/j.1468-2850.2007.00072.x.
- Von Baeyer, C. L.; Spagrud, L. J. (2007). "Systematic review of observational (behavioral) measures of pain for children and adolescents aged 3 to 18 years". Pain. 127 (1–2): 140–150. doi:10.1016/j.pain.2006.08.014. PMID 16996689.
- McGrath, P. J.; Walco, G. A.; Turk, D. C.; Dworkin, R. H.; von Baeyer, C. L.; Zeltzer, L. (2008). "Core outcome domains and measures for pediatric acute and chronic/recurrent pain clinical trials: PedIMMPACT recommendations". The Journal of Pain. 9 (9): 771–783. doi:10.1016/j.jpain.2008.04.007. PMID 18562251.
- Tomlinson, D.; von Baeyer, C. L.; Stinson, J. N.; Sung, L. (2010). "A systematic review of faces scales for the self-report of pain intensity in children". Pediatrics. 126 (5): e1168–e1198. doi:10.1542/peds.2010-1609. PMID 20921070.
