= University of Saskatchewan =

Public university in Saskatoon, Canada

Coordinates: 52°7′47″N 106°37′58″W

- Coat of arms
- Motto: Deo et Patriæ (Latin)
- Motto in English: "For God and Country"
- Type: Public university
- Established: 1907; 119 years ago
- Academic affiliations: ACU; U15; UArctic; UASR; Universities Canada
- Endowment: CAN$509.1 million
- Chancellor: Scott Banda
- President: Vince Bruni-Bossio
- Students: 26,694
- Undergraduates: 21,220
- Postgraduates: 4,630
- Location: Saskatoon, Saskatchewan, Canada
- Campus: Urban
- Colours: Green, yellow and white
- Nickname: Huskies
- Sporting affiliations: U Sports – CWUAA
- Mascot: Howler (the Huskie)
- Website: usask.ca

The University of Saskatchewan (USask, formerly U of S) is a Canadian public research university, founded on March 19, 1907, and located on the east side of the South Saskatchewan River in Saskatoon, Saskatchewan, Canada.

An "Act to establish and incorporate a University for the Province of Saskatchewan" was passed by the provincial legislature in 1907. It established the provincial university on March 19, 1907 "for the purpose of providing facilities for higher education in all its branches and enabling all persons without regard to race, creed or religion to take the fullest advantage". The University of Saskatchewan is the largest education institution in the Canadian province of Saskatchewan. The University of Saskatchewan is one of Canada's top research universities (based on the number of Canada Research Chairs) and is a member of U15 Canada, the 15 most research-intensive universities in the country.

The university began as an agricultural college in 1907 and established the first Canadian university-based department of extension in 1910. There were 120 hectares (300 acres) set aside for university buildings and 400 ha (1,000 acres) for the USask farm, and agricultural fields. In total 10.32 km^{2} (3.98 sq mi) was annexed for the university. The main university campus is situated upon 981 ha (2,425 acres), with another 200 ha (500 acres) allocated for Innovation Place Research Park. The University of Saskatchewan agriculture college still has access to neighbouring urban research lands. The University of Saskatchewan's Vaccine and Infectious Disease Organization (VIDO) facility, (2003) develops DNA-enhanced immunization vaccines for both humans and animals. The university is also home to the Canadian Light Source synchrotron, which is considered one of the largest and most innovative investments in Canadian science. Discoveries made at USask include sulfate-resistant cement and the cobalt-60 cancer therapy unit. The university offers over 200 academic programs.

== History ==
=== Beginnings ===
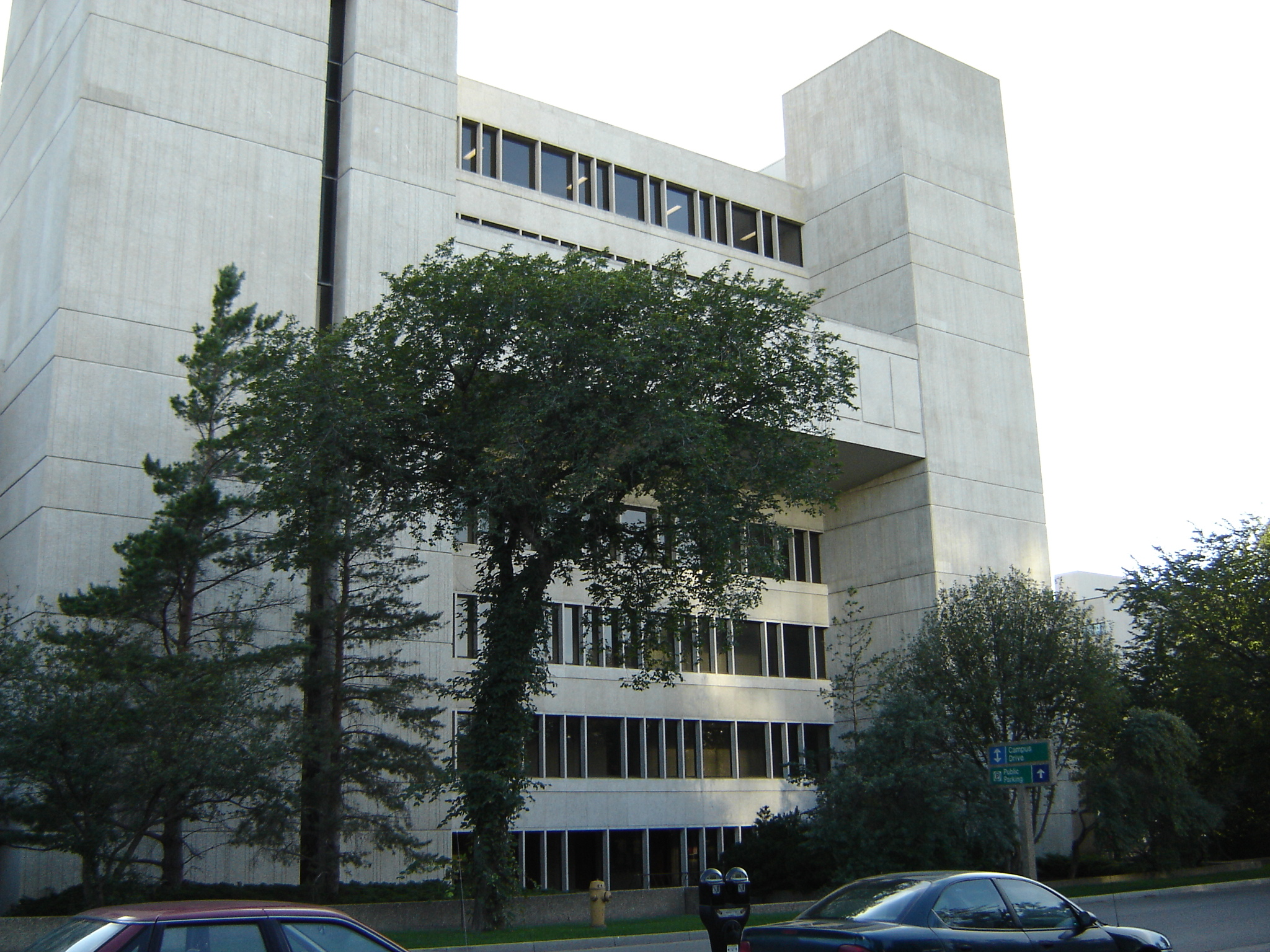
The eastern façade of the Academic Health Sciences Building prior to the construction of the D Wing

The University of Saskatchewan was modeled on the American state university system, with a focus on extension work and applied research to serve the needs of the largely agrarian province. The university was granted a provincial charter through the University Act, which was passed by the Legislative Assembly of Saskatchewan on March 19, 1907. This act established the university as a publicly funded but independent institution, intended to serve the citizens of the province.

The governance was modelled on the provincial University of Toronto Act of 1906 which established a bicameral system of university government consisting of a senate (faculty), responsible for academic policy, and a board of governors (citizens) exercising exclusive control over financial policy and having formal authority in all other matters. The president, appointed by the board, was to provide a link between the two bodies and to perform institutional leadership. The scope of the new institution was to include colleges of arts and science, including art, music and commerce, agriculture with forestry, domestic science, education, engineering, law, medicine, pharmacy, veterinary science and dentistry.

Saskatoon was chosen as the site for the university on April 7, 1909, by the board of governors. On October 12, 1912, the first building opened its doors for student admission. It awarded its first degrees in 1912. Duncan P. McColl was appointed as the first registrar, establishing the first convocation from which Chief Justice Edward L. Wetmore was elected as the first chancellor. Walter Charles Murray became the first president of the university's board of governors. In the early part of this century, professional education expanded beyond the traditional fields of theology, law and medicine. Graduate training based on the German-inspired American model of specialized course work and the completion of a research thesis was introduced.

Battleford, Moose Jaw, Prince Albert, Regina, and Saskatoon all lobbied to be the location of the new university. Walter Murray preferred the provincial capital, Regina. In a politically influenced vote, Saskatoon was chosen on April 7, 1909.

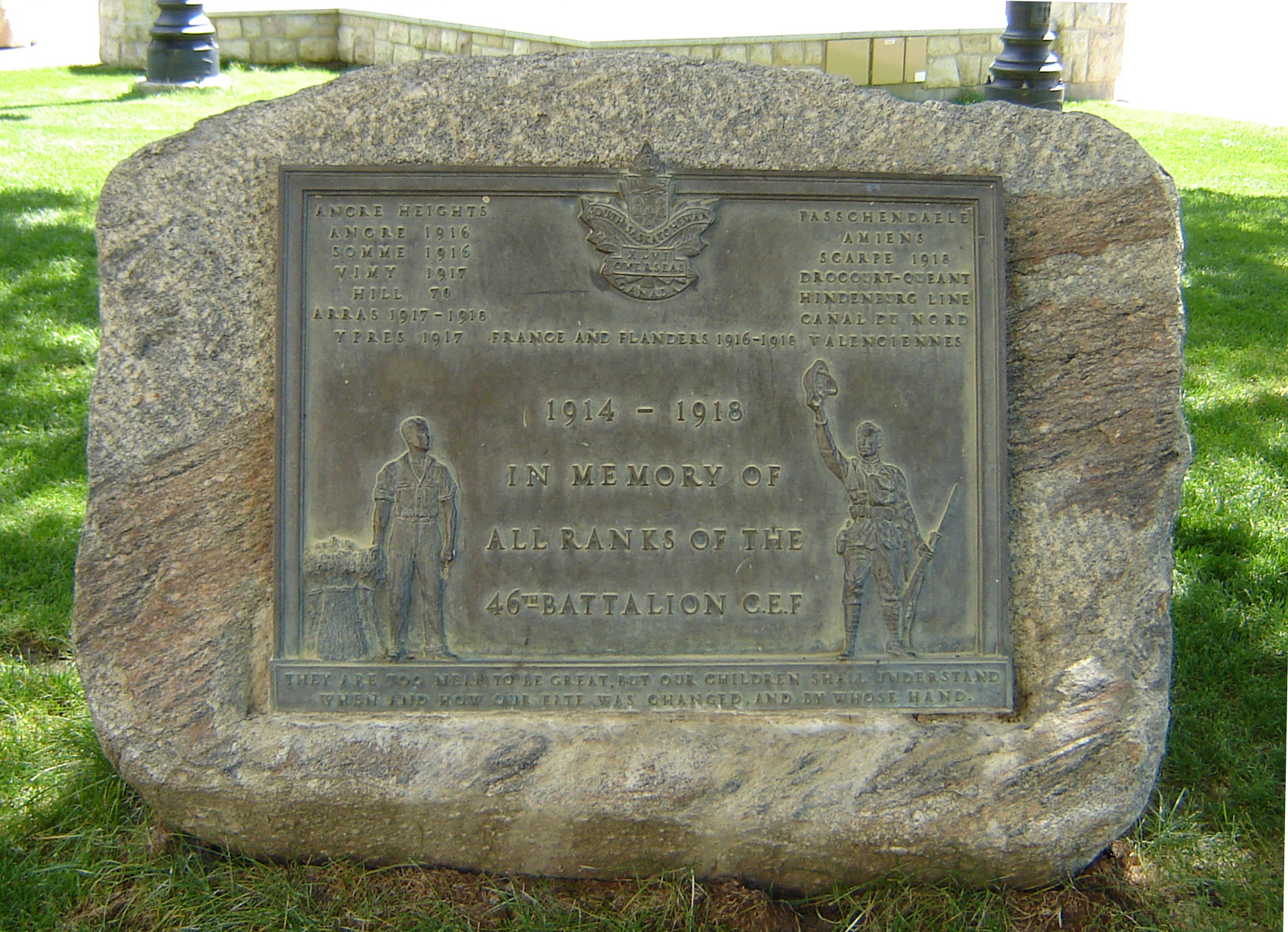
Plaque commemorating World War I veterans: "1914–1918 In Memory of All Ranks of the 46th Battalion C.E.F. They are too near to be great, but our children shall understand when and how our fate was changed, and by whose hand."

Designed by David Robertson Brown (architect), the Memorial Gates were erected in 1927 at the corner of College Drive and Hospital Drive in honour of the University of Saskatchewan alumni who served in the First World War. A stone wall bears inscriptions of the names of the sixty seven university students and faculty who lost their lives while on service during World War I. The hallways of the Old Administrative Building (College Building) at the University of Saskatchewan are decorated with memorial scrolls in honour of the University of Saskatchewan alumni who served in the World Wars.

342 students, faculty, and staff enlisted for World War I. Of these, 67 were killed, 100 were wounded, and 33 were awarded medals of valour.

The University of Saskatchewan's Arms were registered with the Canadian Heraldic Authority on February 15, 2001.

In May 2014, Provost and Academic Vice President Brett Fairbairn resigned following turmoil after the university fired the executive director of the School of Public Health, following his public criticism of a process to address the university's structural deficit. President Ilene Busch-Vishniac refused to resign. Two days later she was fired.

=== Campus ===
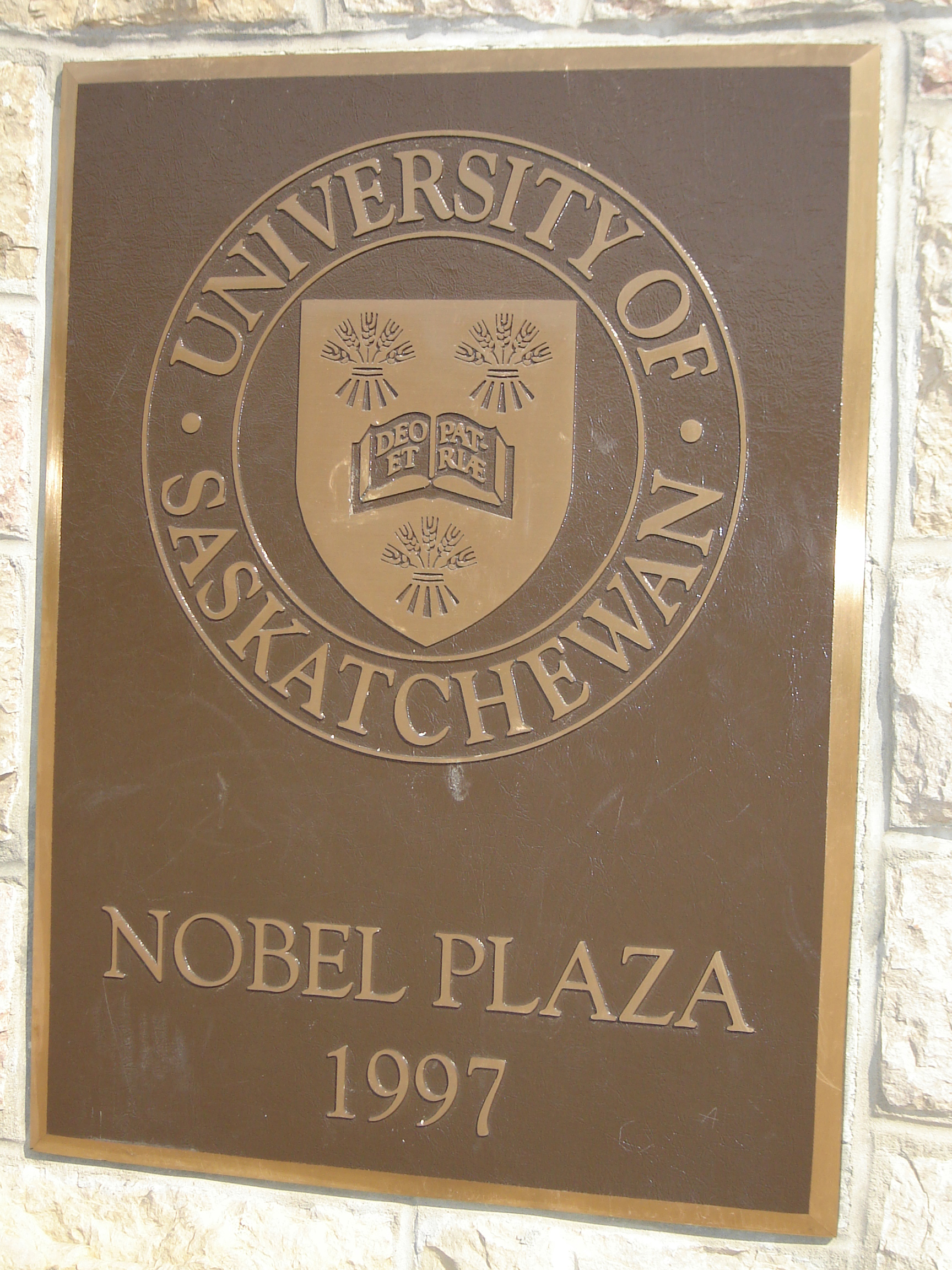
Nobel Plaza, University of Saskatchewan

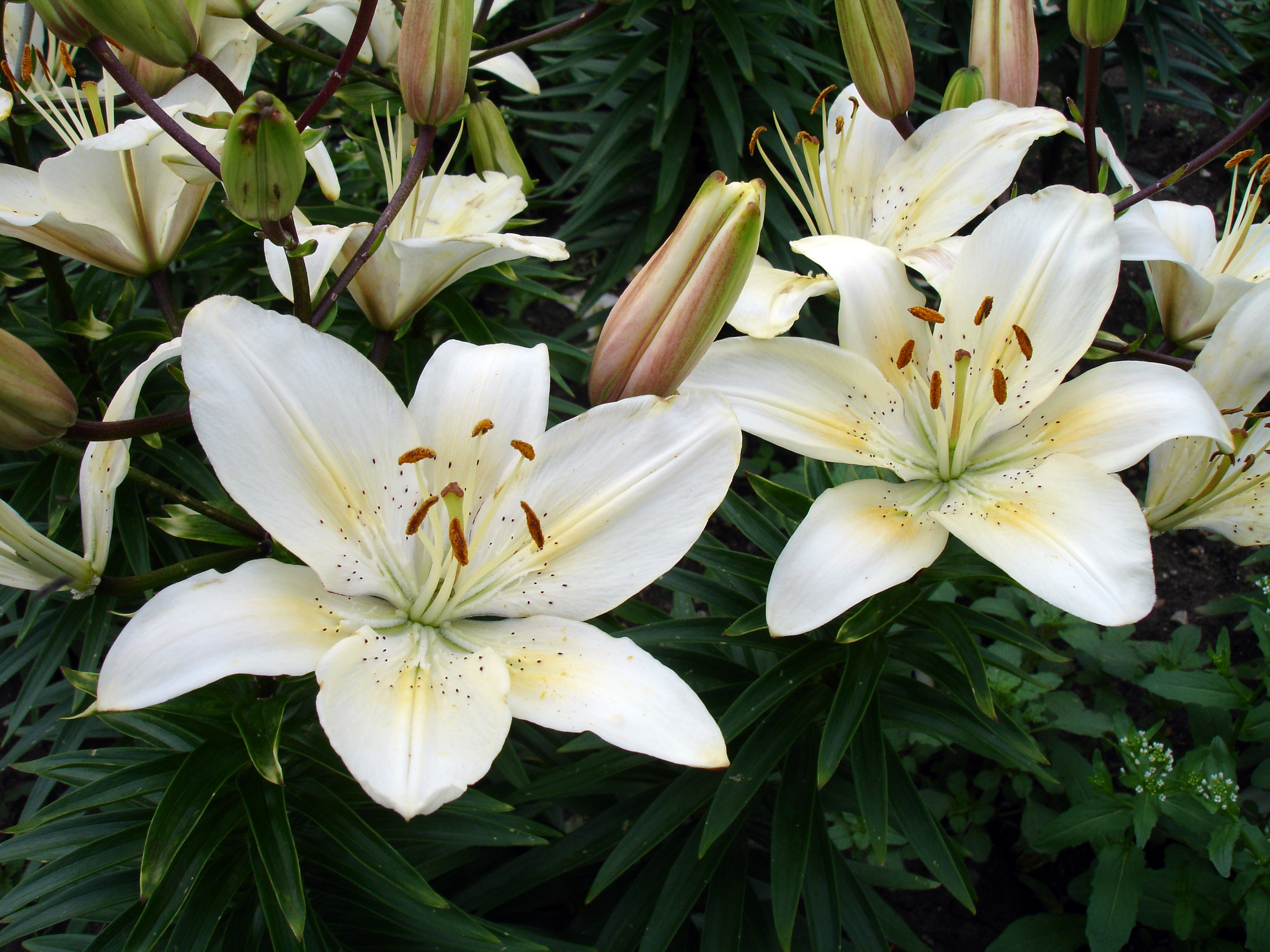
Lilium "University of Saskatchewan" – the University of Saskatchewan centennial lily.

A location next to the South Saskatchewan River, across from the city centre of Saskatoon, was selected for the campus. David Robertson Brown of Brown & Vallance were the initial architects constructing a campus plan and the first university buildings in Collegiate Gothic style: The Prime Minister of Canada, Sir Wilfrid Laurier, laid the cornerstone of the first building, the College Building, on July 29, 1910. The first building to be started on the new campus, the College Building, built 1910–1912 opened in 1913; in 2001, it was declared a National Historic Site of Canada.

Brown & Vallance designed the Administration Building (1910–12); Saskatchewan Hall Student Residence (1910–12). Brown & Vallance designed the Engineering Building (1910–12) as well as additions 1913 in 1920 and rebuilt the building after it burned in 1925. Brown & Vallance designed the Barn and Stock Pavilion (1910–12) and Emmanuel College (1910–12). Brown & Vallance built the Faculty Club (1911–12) and rebuilt it after it burned in 1964. Brown & Vallance constructed the President's Residence (1911–13) Qu'Appelle Hall Student Residence (1914–16) Physics Building (1919–21); Chemistry Building (1922–23); St. Andrew's Presbyterian College (1922–23); Memorial Gates (1927–28) and the Field Husbandry Building (1929).

The original buildings were built using native limestone – greystone – which was mined just north of campus. Over the years, this greystone became one of the most recognizable campus signatures. When the local supply of limestone was exhausted, the university turned to Tyndall stone, which is quarried in Manitoba. Saskatchewan's Provincial University and Agricultural College were officially opened May 1, 1913, by Hon. Walter Scott.

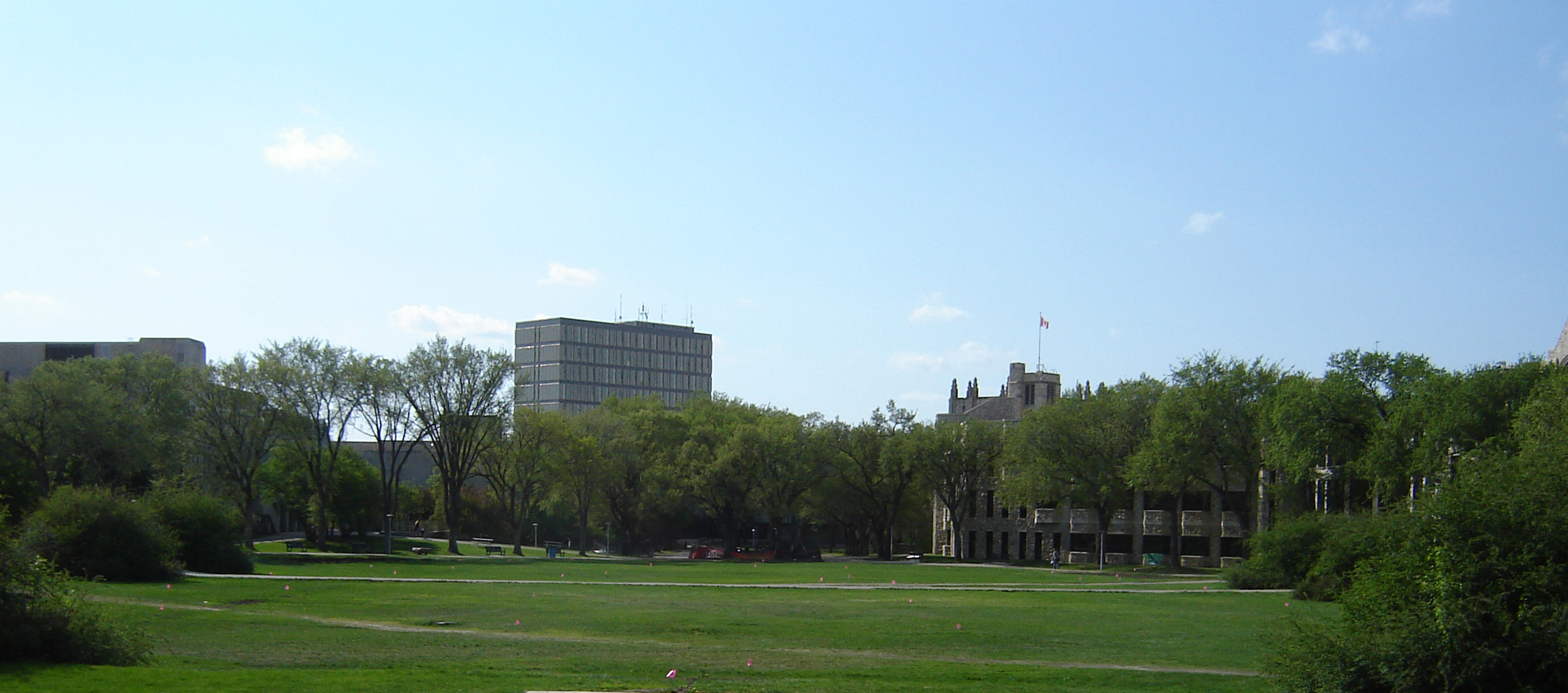
The Bowl, a green space on the University of Saskatchewan main campus, as seen today

The original architectural plan called for the university buildings to be constructed around a green space known as The Bowl. The original university buildings are now connected by skywalks and tunnels. Clockwise, from the north; Thorvaldson Building (August 22, 1924) (Spinks addition); Geology, W.P. Thompson Biology (1960) adjoined to Physics Building (1921); College Building (May 1, 1913) (Administration addition); Saskatchewan conjoined with Athabasca Hall (1964); Qu'Appelle Hall (1916); Marquis Hall adjoined to Place Riel – Qu'Appelle Addition; Murray Memorial Main Library (1956); Arts (1960) conjoined with Law and adjoined to Commerce building complete the initial circle around the perimeter of the bowl.

Francis Henry Portnall and Frank Martin designed the Dairy & Soils Laboratory (1947).

=== Establishment of colleges ===
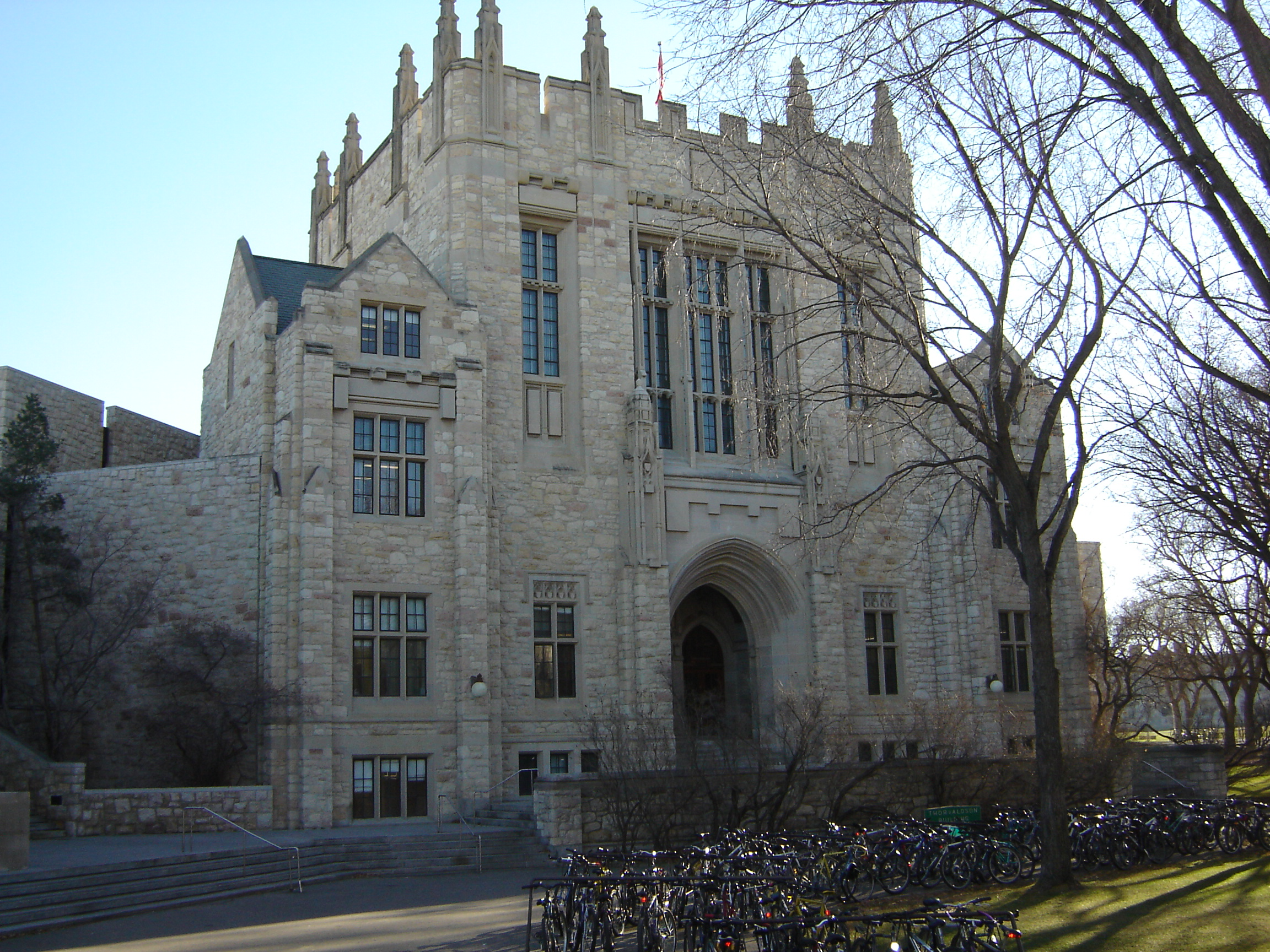
Entrance to Thorvaldson Building located on the Main campus of the University of Saskatchewan

Roughly adhering to the original plan of 1909, numerous colleges were established: Arts & Science (1909); Agriculture, now called Agriculture and Bioresources (1912); Engineering (1912); Law (1913); Pharmacy, now called Pharmacy & Nutrition (1914); Commerce, now the N. Murray Edwards School of Business (1917); Medicine (1926); Education (1927); Home Economics (1928); Nursing (1938); Graduate Studies and Research (1946); Physical Education, now called Kinesiology (1958); Veterinary Medicine (1964); Dentistry (1965); and the School of Physical Therapy (1976).

USask also has several graduate programs amongst these colleges, which give rise to a master's or doctorate degree. In 1966, the University of Saskatchewan introduced a master's program in adult education. Diploma, and certificate post secondary courses are also available to aid in professional development.

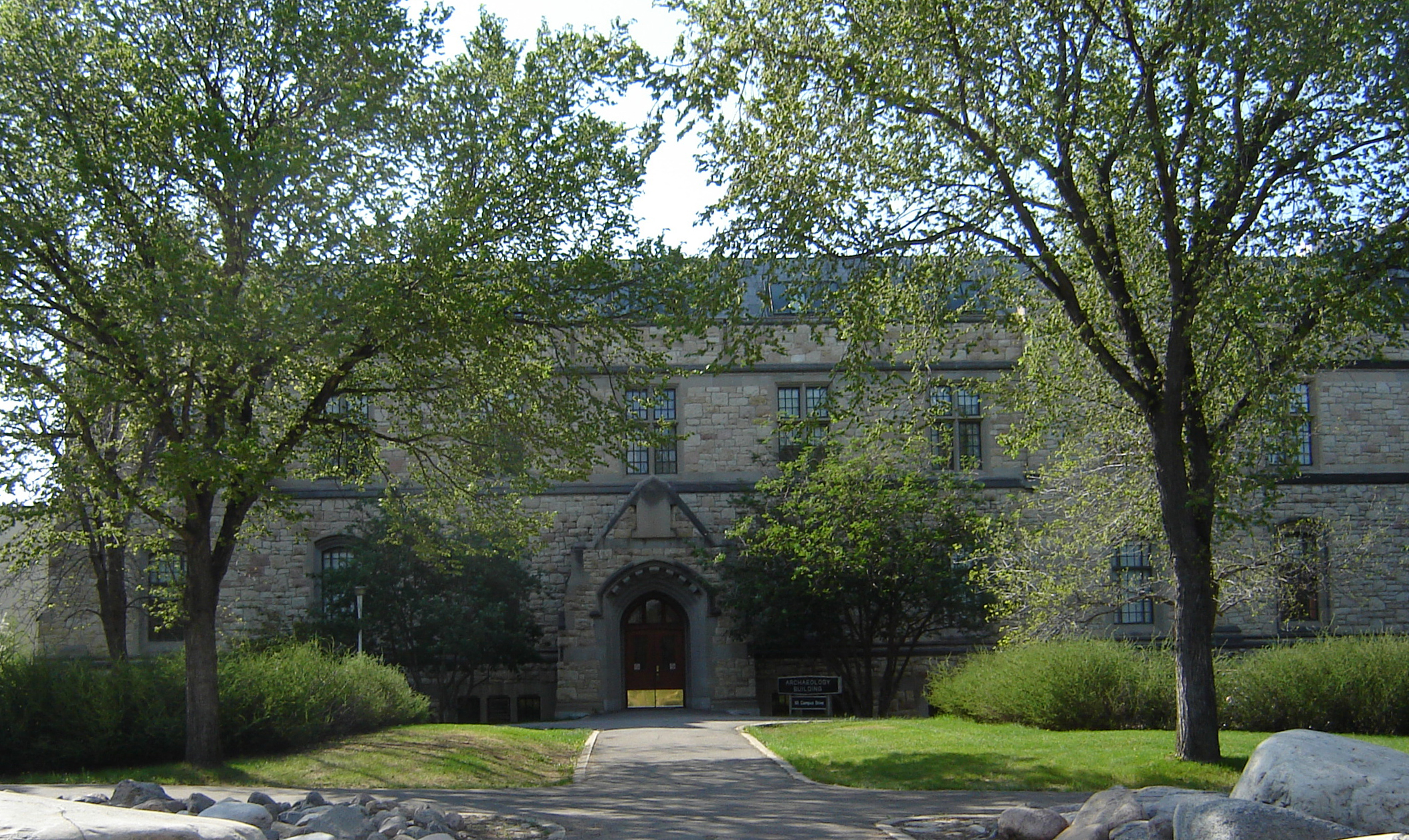
Entrance to the Anthropology & Archaeology Building of the University of Saskatchewan

Theological colleges, affiliated with the university, were also established: Emmanuel College – (Anglican denomination) (1909), St. Andrew's College (as Presbyterian College, Saskatoon) then United Church of Canada (1913), Lutheran Theological Seminary (1920), St. Thomas More College (1936), and Central Pentecostal College (1983).

Regina College was saved from bankruptcy and became part of the university in 1934, and was given degree-granting privileges in 1959, making it a second University of Saskatchewan campus. By another act of legislation in 1974, Regina College was made an independent institution known as the University of Regina.

The policy of university education initiated in the 1960s responded to population pressure and the belief that higher education was a key to social justice and economic productivity for individuals and for society. The single-university policy in the West was changed as existing colleges of the provincial universities gained autonomy as universities.

Correspondence courses were established in 1929.

Other federated and affiliated colleges include Briercrest Bible College and Biblical Seminary in Caronport, Saskatchewan; Gabriel Dumont College and St. Peter's Historic Junior College in Muenster, Saskatchewan.

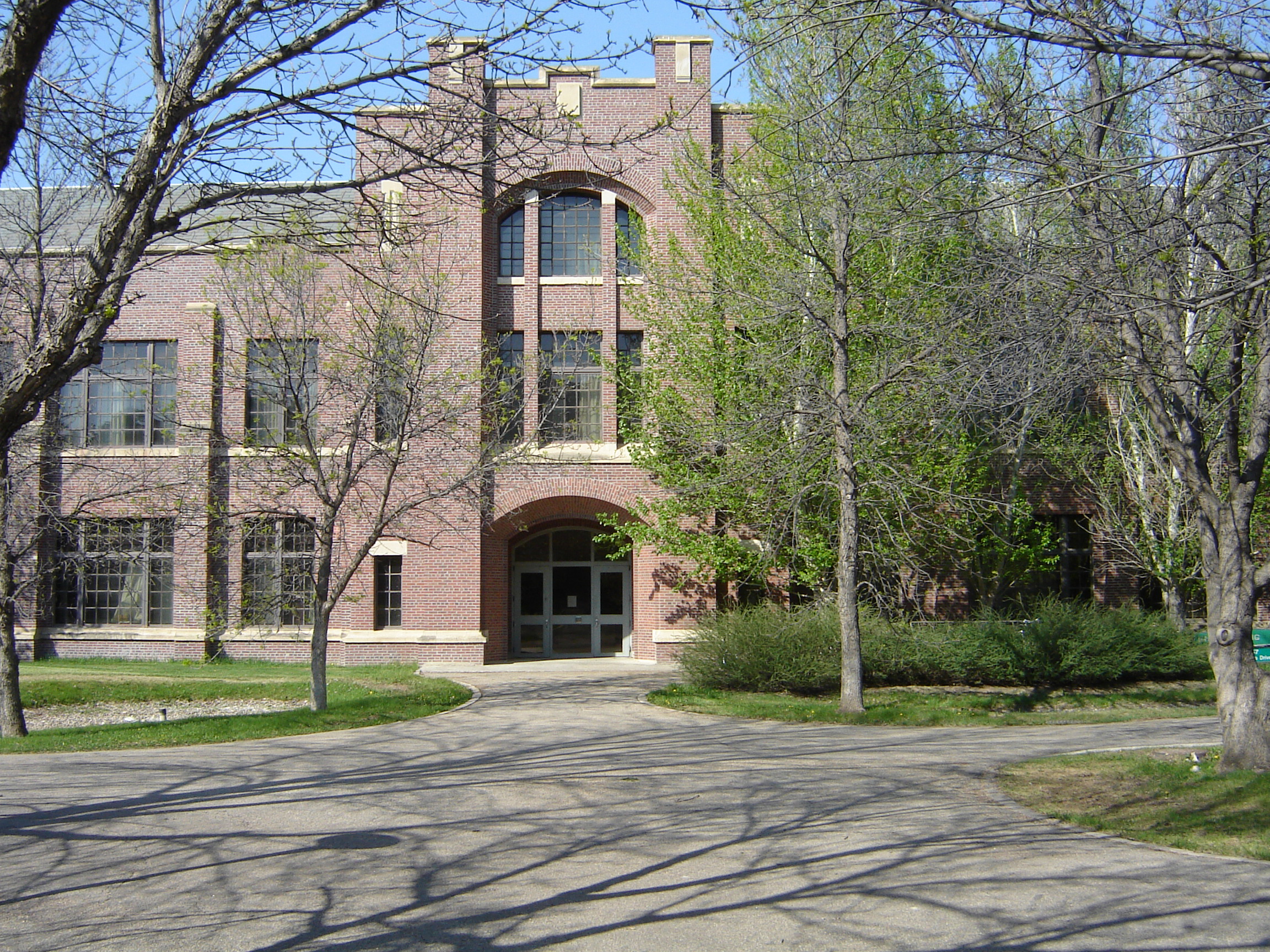
Entrance to the Engineering Building located on the Main campus of the University of Saskatchewan

=== Later development ===
In the late 1990s, USask launched a major revitalisation program, comprising new capital projects such as an expansion to the Western College of Veterinary Medicine, the building of a new parkade, and a revision of its internal road layout (which has already seen the East Road access being realigned). The Thorvaldson Building, which is home to the departments of chemistry and computer science, hosts a new expansion known as the Spinks addition. The College of Pharmacy and Nutrition has also had a number of renovations.

=== Land holdings ===
Up until the late 1980s, the University of Saskatchewan held an extensive area of land in the northeast quadrant of Saskatoon, stretching far beyond the core campus, east of Preston Avenue and north of the Sutherland and Forest Grove subdivisions. Much of this land was used for farming, though some areas were intended for future campus and facility development. In the late 1980s, most USask land beyond Circle Drive was earmarked for residential development; Silverspring was the first of these neighbourhoods to be developed.

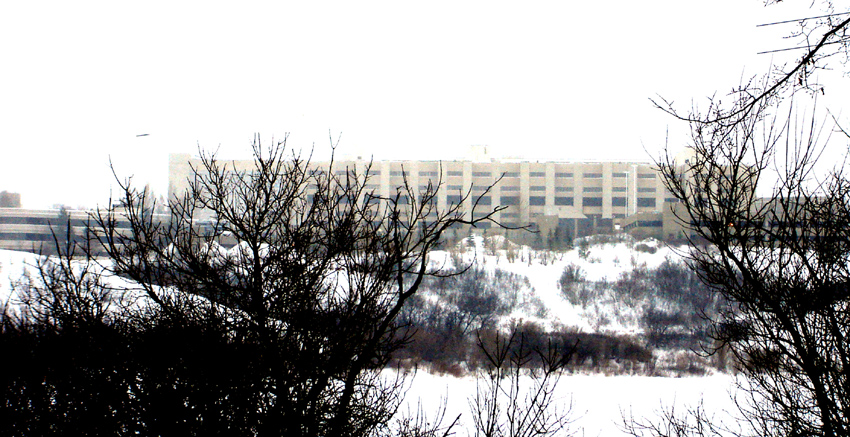
The Royal University Hospital (1955 Wing)

Another section of land, west of the Preston Avenue/Circle Drive interchange and north of the Canadian Pacific Railway line, was zoned for commercial use, and led to "big box" retail development in the early 2000s called Preston Crossing. Realignment of two major roads in the area around this same time (Preston Avenue and 108th Street) also used up a portion of university land. USask obtained a large tract of land immediately east of the Saskatoon city limits after the city annexed the northeastern section of USask land (this land has since been itself annexed into the city). USask leased a site to the Correctional Service of Canada north of Attridge Drive on Central Avenue for the Regional Psychiatric Centre. It has an additional undeveloped parcel of land at Central Avenue and Fedoruk Road.

In the 1970s and again in the 1980s, USask considered opening up some of its land holdings south of College Drive and north of 14th Street for residential development, but opposition from nearby neighbourhoods that appreciated the "green belt" offered by the university led to these plans being dropped. The city has refrained from indicating any residential development plans for the newer land holdings in the northeast, allowing another green belt to be created separating the new communities of Evergreen and Aspen Ridge from other parts of the city.

The City of Saskatoon's Fire Station No. 5 was relocated to the university's land on Preston Avenue North in 2023. It replaced the former station on Central Avenue in the Sutherland neighbourhood, which dated back to 1967.

== Academics ==
=== Rankings and reputation ===
University rankings

World rankings
- ARWU World: 401–500
- QS World: 378
- THE World: 351–400
- USNWR World: 544
- 17–18

Canadian rankings
- QS National: 14
- THE National: 16
- USNWR National: 19
- Maclean's Medical/Doctoral: 15
- Maclean's Reputation: 25

The University of Saskatchewan has placed in post-secondary school rankings. In the 2023 Academic Ranking of World Universities rankings, the university ranked 301–400 in the world and 12–17 in Canada. The 2025 QS World University Rankings ranked the university 340th in the world and 14th in Canada. The 2024 Times Higher Education World University Rankings placed the university 351–400 in the world, and 16th in Canada. In U.S. News & World Report 2022–23 global university rankings, the university placed 441st, and 18th in Canada. In Maclean's 2024 rankings, Saskatchewan placed 15th in their Medical-Doctoral university category, and 21st in their reputation ranking for Canadian universities.

In February 2025, the University of Saskatchewan was identified as one of Saskatchewan's top 100 employers, based on employees having 'free access to the campus' extensive fitness facilities' and 21-week / 95% of salary maternity and parental leave benefits for 'all new parents'.

=== Programs ===
The University of Saskatchewan offers a wide variety of programs and courses. Agriculture and Bioresources, Arts and Science, Biotechnology, Edwards School of Business, Dentistry, Education, Engineering, Graduate and Postdoctoral Studies, Kinesiology, Law, Medicine, Nursing, Pharmacy and Nutrition, Physical Therapy and Veterinary Medicine.

In addition, the university's affiliated colleges and Centre for Continuing and Distance Education offer degree programs, certificates, and training programs. Many affiliated colleges allow students to complete the first two years of a Bachelor of Science or Bachelor of Arts degree, and some offer full degrees in education, native studies, and theology.

=== Research ===
In 1948, the university built the first betatron facility in Canada. Three years later, the world's first non-commercial cobalt-60 therapy unit was constructed. (The first female chancellor of the university, Sylvia Fedoruk, was a member of the cobalt-60 research team. She also served as Saskatchewan's lieutenant-governor from 1988 to 1994.) The success of these facilities led to the construction of a linear accelerator as part of the Saskatchewan Accelerator Laboratory in 1964 and placed university scientists at the forefront of nuclear physics in Canada. The Plasma Physics Laboratory operates a tokamak on campus. The university used the SCR-270 radar in 1949 to image the Aurora for the first time.

Experience gained from years of research and collaboration with global researchers led to the University of Saskatchewan being selected as the site of Canada's national facility for synchrotron light research, the Canadian Light Source. This facility opened October 22, 2004, and is the size of a football field.

The university also is home to the Vaccine and Infectious Disease Organization. Innovation Place Research Park is an industrial science and technology park that hosts private industry working with the university.

The university of Saskatchewan is an active member of the University of the Arctic. UArctic is an international cooperative network based in the Circumpolar Arctic region, consisting of more than 200 universities, colleges, and other organizations with an interest in promoting education and research in the Arctic region.

The university participates in UArctic's mobility program north2north. The aim of that program is to enable students of member institutions to study in different parts of the North.

=== Partner universities ===
- Beijing Institute of Technology, Beijing, China
- Xi'an Jiao Tong University, Xi'an, China
- University of Greifswald, Greifswald, Germany
- Darmstadt University of Technology, Darmstadt, Germany
- Vellore Institute of Technology, India
- University of Oslo, Norway
- University of Canterbury, New Zealand
- University of Oxford, Oxford, England
- Stockholm University, Stockholm, Sweden

== Administration and governance ==
The University Act provided that the university should provide "facilities for higher education in all its branches and enabling all persons without regard to race, creed or religion to take the fullest advantage". It further stated that "no woman shall by reason of her sex be deprived of any advantage or privilege accorded to the male students of the university." Seventy students began the first classes on September 28, 1909. The first class graduated on May 1, 1912. Of the three students who earned graduation honours, two were women. The University of Saskatchewan has a tricameral governance structure, defined by the University of Saskatchewan Act, consisting of a Board of Governors, University Council, and Senate, as well as the General Academic Assembly. Financial, management, as well as administration affairs are handled by the Board of Governors, which comprises 11 members. The University of Saskatchewan liaison between the public and professional sector is dealt with by the university Senate, a body of 100 representatives. Finally, University Council is made up of a combination of 116 faculty and students. Council is the university's academic governing body, responsible for "overseeing and directing the University's academic affairs." The General Academic Assembly consists of all faculty members and elected students. As of 2006, faculty and staff total 7,000, and student enrolment comprised 15,005 full-time students as well as 3,552 part-time students.

The seal of the university

The university senior administration consists of the President and Vice-Chancellor Professor, Peter Stoicheff; the Provost and Vice-president Academic, Professor Arini; Vice-president (Finance & Resources), Greg Fowler; Vice-president (Research), Professor Baljit Singh; and the vice-president (University Relations) Debra Pozega Osburn.

== Campus life and facilities ==
The Sheaf, a student publication, was first published in 1912, monthly or less frequently. By 1920, it was published weekly with the aim of becoming a more unifying influence on student life. It has continued to publish.

In 1965, a student-run campus radio station, CJUS-FM began broadcasting on a non-commercial basis. In 1983, the station became a limited commercial station. By 1985, however, funding was no longer provided, and the campus radio presence died. In early 2005, CJUS was revived in an internet radio form and continues to broadcast today. The university also maintains a relationship with the independent community radio station CFCR-FM, which actively solicits volunteers on campus.

Place Riel Theatre, a campus theatre, was opened in 1975, as was Louis, a campus pub. Place Riel, the existing campus student centre, opened in 1980, and now holds retail outlets, arcade, lounge space, student group meeting areas, and a food court. Place Riel underwent expansion and renovation, which was completed around 2012–13. These facilities were named after Louis Riel. In the late 1990s, Place Riel Theatre stopped public showings and it is now used for campus movie features and lectures.

The University of Saskatchewan Students' Union is the students' union representing full-time undergraduate students at the University of Saskatchewan.

Since 1992, the graduate students are represented by the University of Saskatchewan Graduate Student's Association (GSA-uSask), a not-for-profit student organization that provides services, events, student clubs and advocacy work to the graduate students of USask. Since 2007, the GSA-uSask is located in the Emmanuel and St. Chad Chapel, also called GSA Commons.

=== Athletics ===
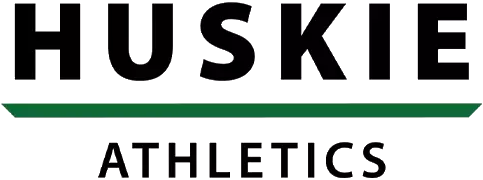
Saskatchewan athletics wordmark

Campus sports teams in U Sports use the name "Saskatchewan Huskies". The teams compete in five men's sports: Canadian football, basketball, hockey, soccer, and volleyball. Women's sports include basketball, hockey, soccer, and volleyball. Co-ed sports include cross country, track and field, and wrestling.

The Huskies Track and Field team has won the national championships on 12 occasions and is the most successful team on campus The men's Huskies football team has won the Vanier Cup as national champions on three occasions; in 1990, 1996, and 1998.

=== Museums and galleries ===
The Agricultural Displays and Kloppenburg Collection are hosted in the Agriculture & Bioresources College. The agricultural wall displays are located in the walkway connecting the Agriculture Building and the Biology Building. The Kloppenburg Collection is featured on the sixth floor of the College of Agriculture and Bioresources building which opened in 1991. Twenty seven works by famous Saskatchewan artists are featured in this donation to the University of Saskatchewan. Beamish Conservatory and Leo Kristjanson Atrium is also located within the Agriculture & Bioresources College. The Leo Kristjanson atrium is located in the College of Agriculture and Bioresources building and hosts the conservatory. The Beamish Conservatory is named in honour of the donor May Beamish who is the daughter of artist Augustus Kenderdine.

The University of Saskatchewan's 75th Anniversary in 1984 was the starting catalyst for the Athletic Wall of Fame at which time 75 honours were bestowed. The wall of fame celebrates achievements by athletes, teams securing a regional and/or national championship, as well as builders who can be either an administrator, coach, manager, trainer or other major contributor toward the Huskie athletic community for a time period of at least 10 years and have provided outstanding notable support. As of 2001, an annual event, the Huskie Salute inaugurates a new candidate into the Athletic Wall of Fame.

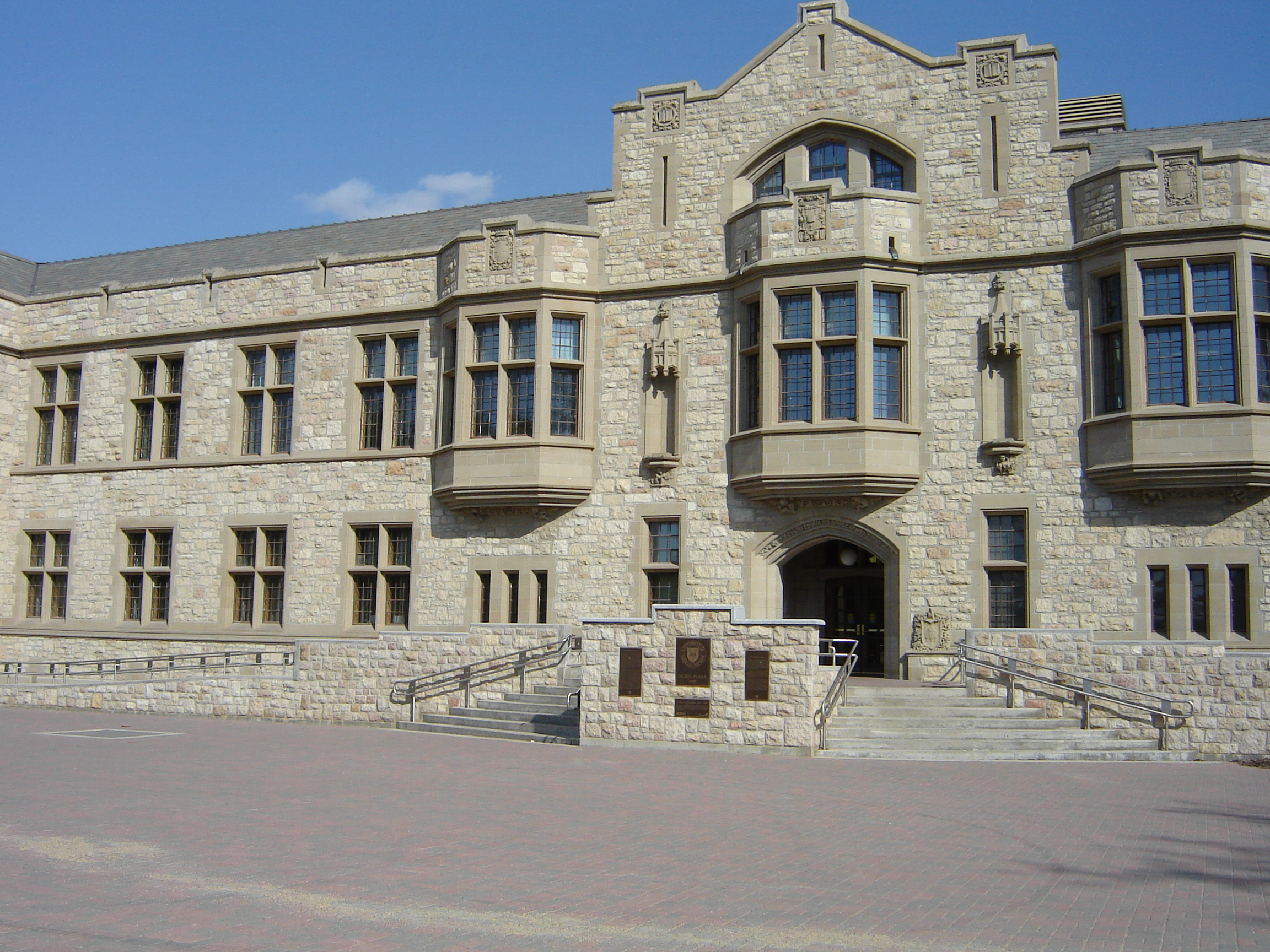
Peter MacKinnon Building

The College Building was officially declared a Canadian National Historic Site by Sheila Copps, Minister of Canadian Heritage on February 27, 2001. The College Building was the first building under construction on the university, and upon completion was used for agriculture degree classes.

The Right Honourable John G. Diefenbaker Centre for the Study of Canada, also known as the Diefenbaker Canada Centre, houses the Diefenbaker paper collection and legacy, changing exhibit, Centre for the Study of Co-operatives and the Native Law Centre. The grave site of Canadian Prime Minister John Diefenbaker is located near this museum.

The Gordon Snelgrove Gallery is teaching facility and a public gallery that is managed through the Department of Art & Art History. It provides a venue for new work by artists and curators both within the department and the wider community. It has a full-time director and a number of part-time staff.

Additionally, the gallery curates the Department of Art and Art History Collection, consisting of select works from graduating students. Art from the collection is displayed throughout the Murray Building, the university library, a number of sites on campus and the gallery website.

The gallery is located at 191 Murray Building on the University of Saskatchewan campus. It is open Monday to Friday, 9:30 am to 4:30 pm and closed weekends and holidays.

The Kenderdine Art Gallery celebrated its official opening October 25, 1991. Augustus Frederick Lafosse (Gus) Kenderdine began the University Art Camp at Emma Lake in 1936, the precursor to the Emma Lake Kenderdine Campus, a bequest was donated to the University of Saskatchewan by his daughter, Mrs. May Beamish, and initialized the formation of the Kenderdine Art Gallery which has a permanent collection started by Dr. Murray, as well as ongoing exhibits. The Kenderdine collection consists of archival material and 4,000 works, including paintings, sketches, ceramics, porcelain or pottery, glass, textiles or tapestries many by 19th and 20th century Saskatchewan, Canadian and international artists. The MacAulay Pharmaceutical Collection is located in the Thorvaldson Building, Room 118A. The collection showcases early 20th-century pharmaceutical paraphernalia, as well as early First Nations remedies such as cherry bark syrup and smartweed.

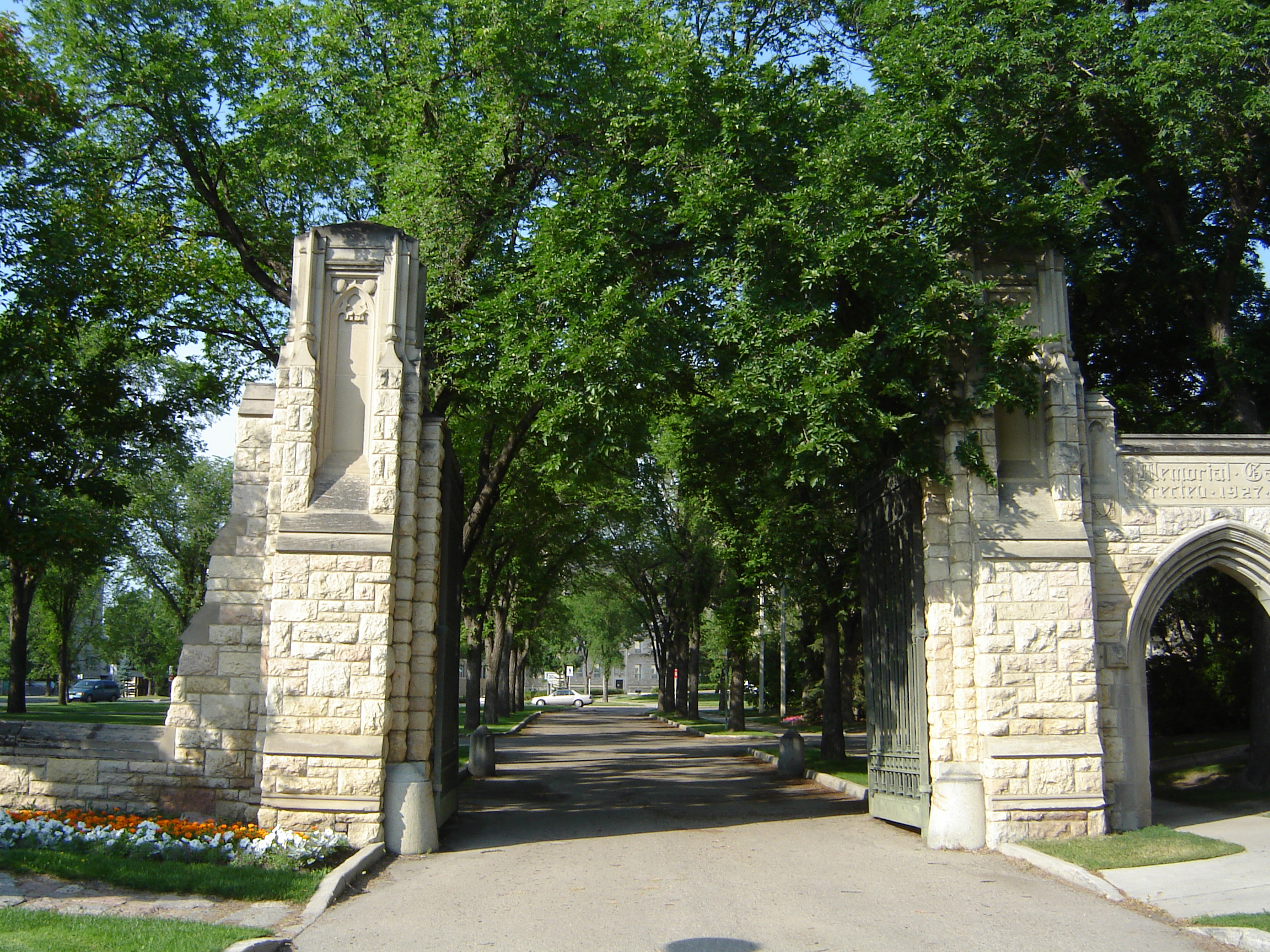
The Memorial Gates at the University of Saskatchewan

The Memorial Gates were constructed in honour of those USask students who made the ultimate sacrifice. Inscribed on the gates themselves is an inscription, "These are they who went forth from this University to the Great War and gave their lives that we might live in freedom." The gates originally straddled the main road entrance to the campus via University Drive (later, this became the access road into Royal University Hospital); when a new road access, Hospital Drive, was constructed to the west in the 1990s, the gates were preserved in their original location.

The Museum of Antiquities started its collection in 1974, and opened in 1981 at its new location. The museum celebrates notable artistic, sculptural and art achievements of various civilizations and eras.

The Museum of Natural Sciences in the geology building features a two-story high plant-filled atrium demonstrating the evolution of life on earth. It houses a live gallery of animals including aquariums, and extensive geological specimens as well as paleontological specimens, including a full-size skeletal replica of a Tyrannosaurus Rex.

The University of Saskatchewan Observatory offers public viewing hours, school tours, as well as an adopt-a-star program. An adopted star can commemorate a special or significant achievement, or person and the award is given via certificate, honourable registry mention and maps of star location and facts sheet.

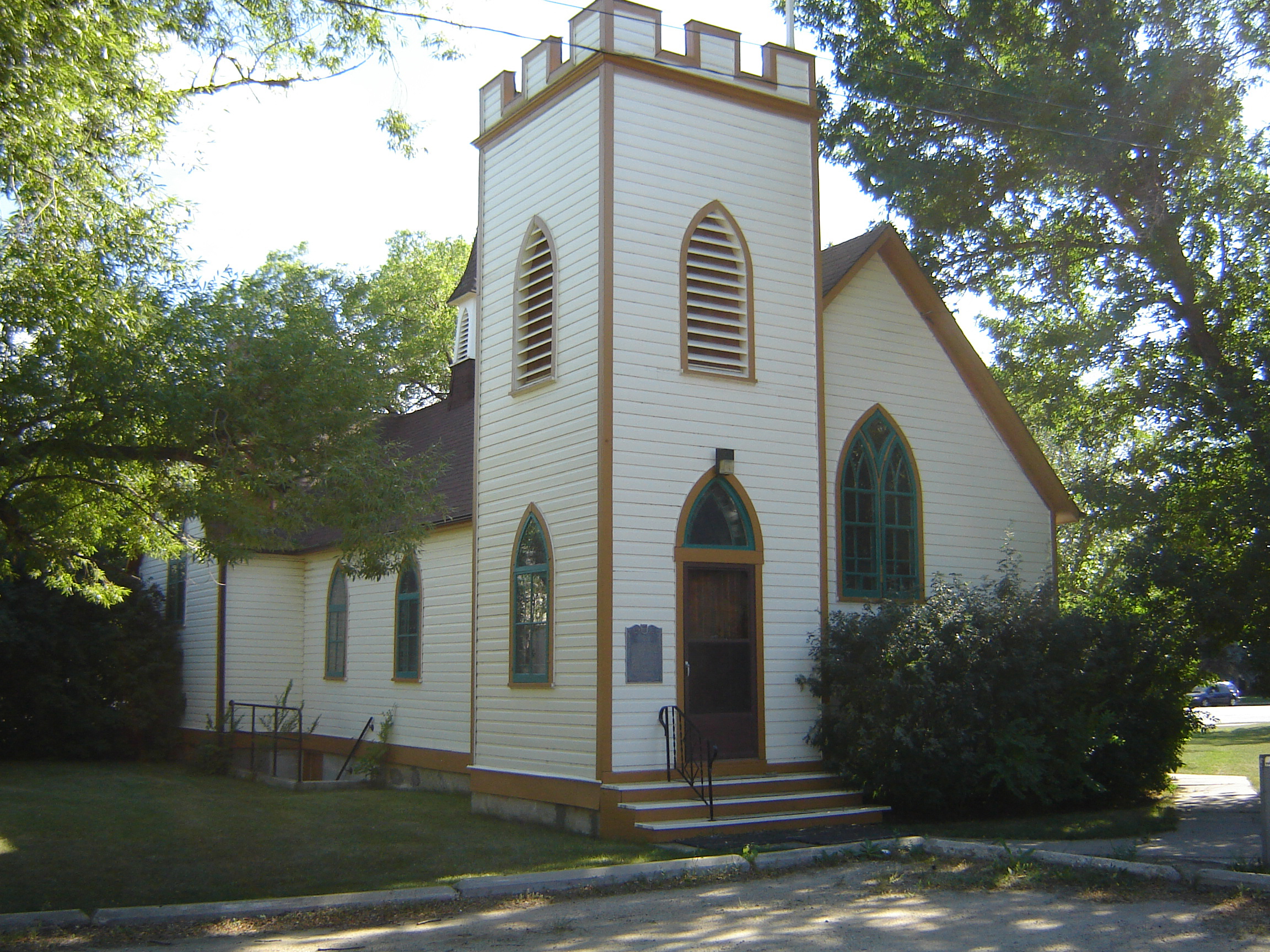
Rugby Chapel

The Rugby Chapel, built in 1912 (as a gift from the students of Rugby School) and moved from Prince Albert, has been declared a City of Saskatoon Municipal Heritage Property. Rugby Chapel, the precursor to College of Emmanuel and St. Chad was first constructed in 1883 and designated The University of Saskatchewan (Saskatchewan Provisional District of the North West Territories), in Prince Albert.

The St. Thomas More College Art Gallery was first opened in 1964 and hosts artwork of local and regional artists.

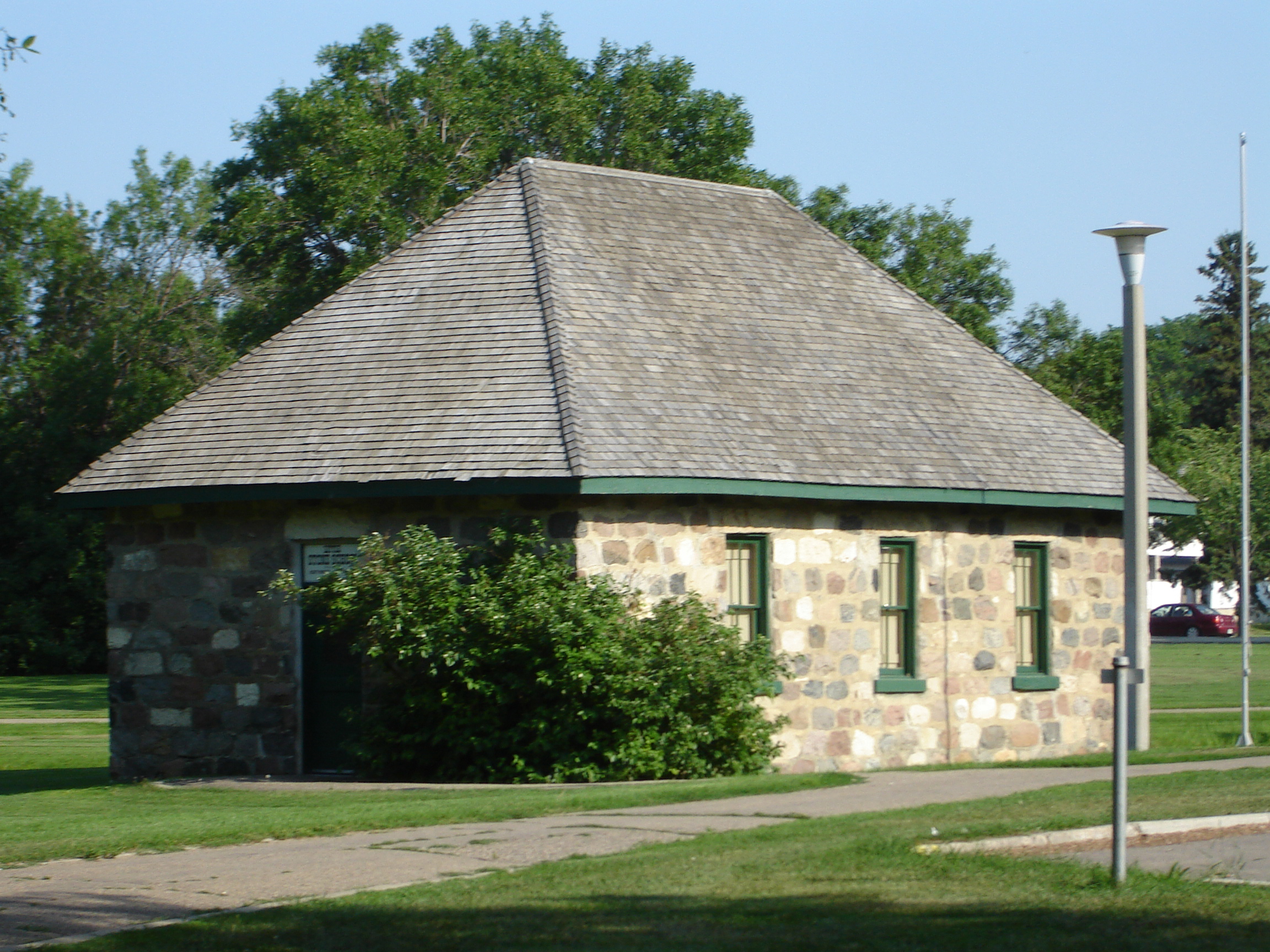
Victoria One room schoolhouse

The Victoria School House, known also as the Little Stone School House, was built in 1888 as the first school house of the Temperance Colony. The one room school house was originally constructed in Nutana. The location is now known as five corners at the south or top of the Broadway Bridge. The school yard at one time comprised three school houses, as the population grew. The little stone school house was preserved and moved on campus. It was declared a historic site on June 1, 1967.

Also composed for the university is an Alma Mater hymn known as "University Hymn". Neil Harris wrote the hymn in 1949. The hymn is performed at convocation events.

=== Residence life ===
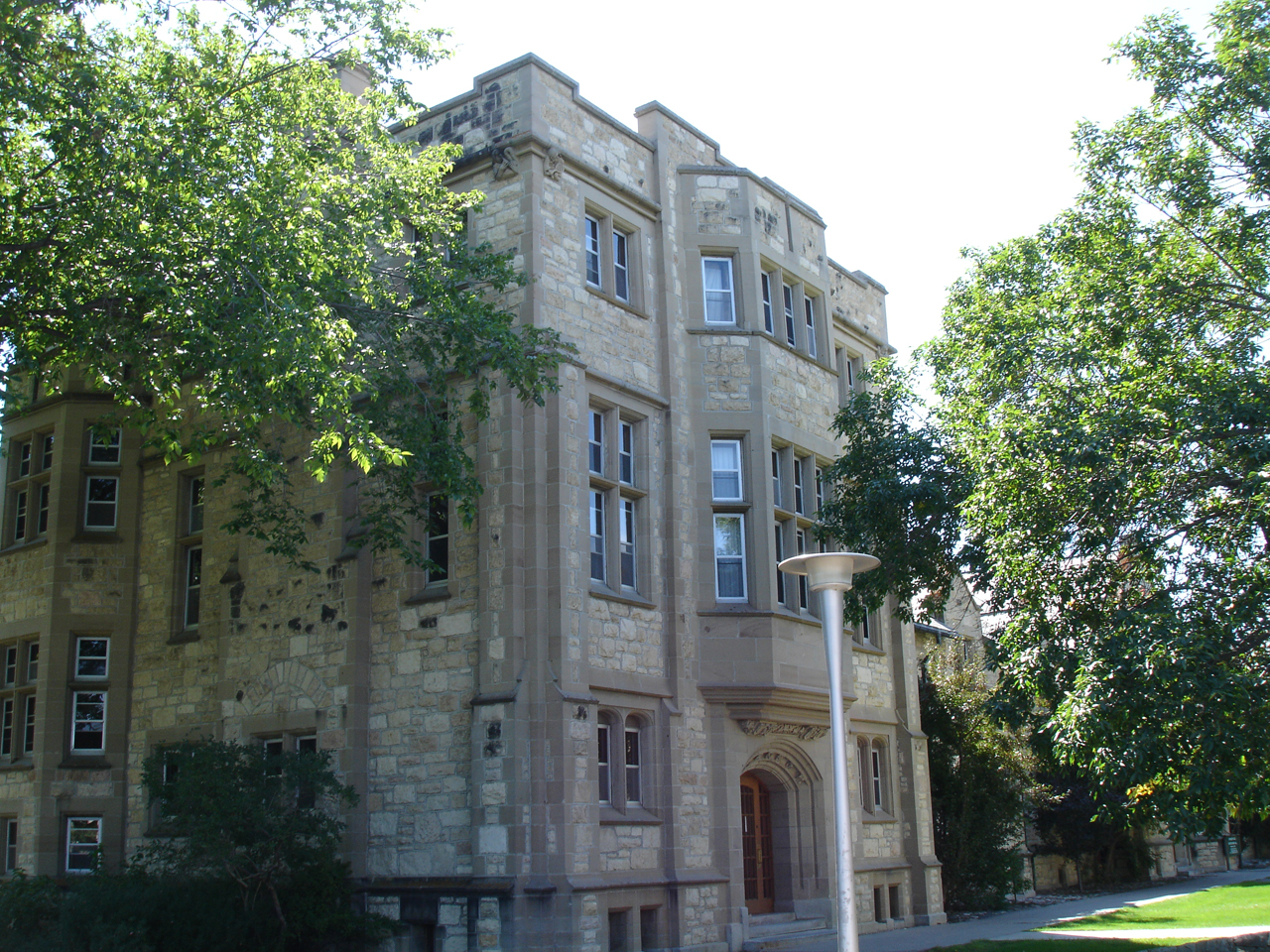
The Saskatchewan Hall student residence

- Voyageur Place 'Room and board' residences on the University of Saskatchewan campus and comprises four separate halls.
  - Saskatchewan Hall was the first student residence of the university and was completed in 1912. Originally called University Hall, it was designed to provide residences for 150 students. Saskatchewan Hall was named for the Saskatchewan River.
  - Qu'Appelle Hall was originally known as Student's Residence No. 2 and officially opened in 1916. The design housed 120 students, and in 1963 an addition for 60 additional student residences was completed. The Qu'Appelle Hall Addition is the fourth residence of Voyageur Place and houses male students. Qu'Appelle Hall was named for the Qu'Appelle River.
  - Athabasca Hall provides 270 residences and was completed in 1964. It is now a co-ed hall. Athabasca Hall was named for the Athabasca River.

Voyageur Place has historically been organized on the house system, with each house named after an explorer associated with Saskatchewan's early history. Thus, traditionally there were three male houses: Hearne House (named after Samuel Hearne and consisting of the residents of Saskatchewan Hall); Kelsey (named after Henry Kelsey and consisting of the residents of Qu'Appelle Hall); and Lav (named after Pierre Gaultier de Varennes, sieur de La Vérendrye and consisting of the residents of Qu'Appelle Hall Addition). There were also three female houses (all of which were composed of residents of the all-female Athabasca Hall): Pond (named after Peter Pond), Henday (named after Anthony Henday), and Palliser (named after John Palliser).

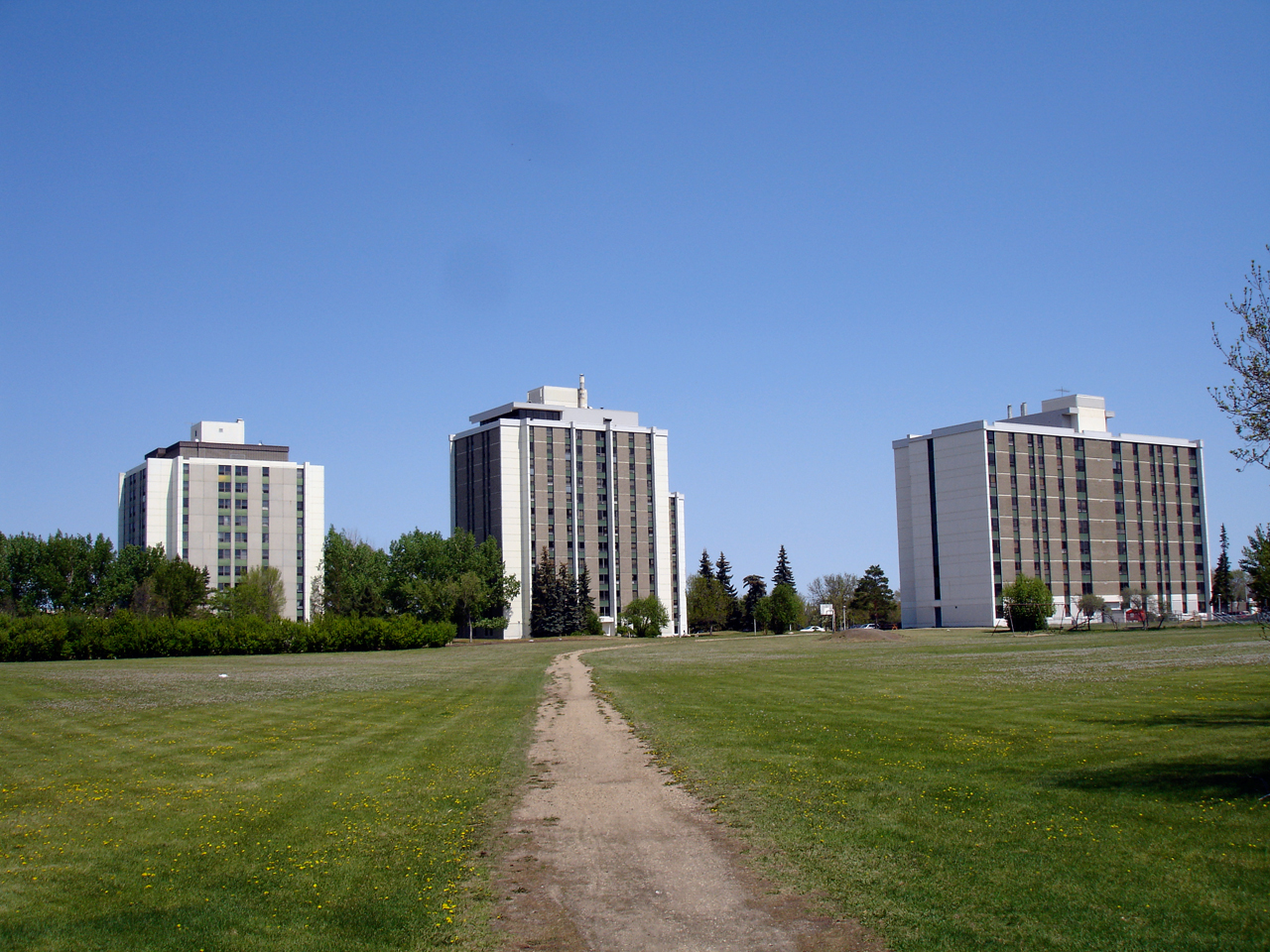
McEown Park student residence highrises

- McEown Park – Residence complex south of the university campus. Opening ceremonies were October 2, 1970, for the four high rise complex. McEown Park was named in honour of a university administrator, A.C. McEown.
  - Souris Hall is an apartment complex for married students with families. Souris Hall, named after the Souris River, is a nine-storey town house, comprising 67 two-bedroom apartments.
  - Assiniboine Hall is an eleven-storey apartment house which has 23 two-bedroom and 84 one-bedroom apartments available for married or single students without families. Assiniboine Hall was named for the Assiniboine River.
  - Wollaston Hall was added to McEown Park complex in 1976, providing 21 two-bedroom and 83 one-bedroom apartments.
  - Seager Wheeler Hall provides housing for single students living in small groups in a fourteen-storey residential house. Seager Wheeler Hall was named in honour of Seager Wheeler, a notable Saskatchewan pioneer for breeding wheat. This residence was on the original three complexes built at McEown Park.

Graduate House is the university's newest residence, which opened in 2013 in the College Quarter.

=== Protective Services ===
The heraldic badge of the University of Saskatchewan Protective Services, shown with the updated 2023 Canadian Royal Crown

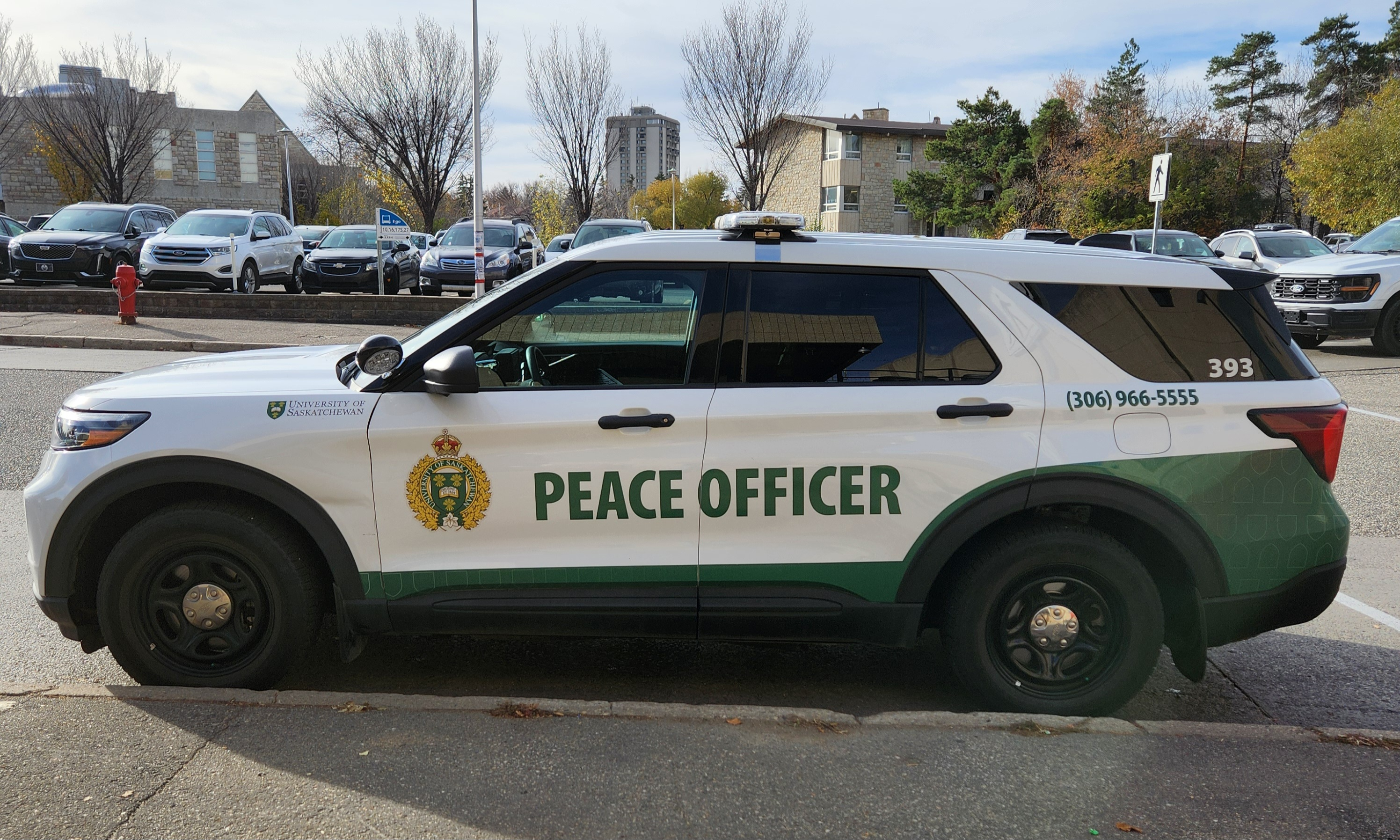
Protective Services SUV outside Place Riel in 2025

The University of Saskatchewan Protective Services serve as the campus police for the University. Protective Services officers are peace officers who work closely with the Saskatoon Police Service and other law enforcement agencies, such as the RCMP to maintain a safe and secure campus. Officers patrol on foot, bicycle and in marked patrol vehicles.

Protective Services are responsible for managing the University's lost and found system, and enforcing federal and provincial laws, as well as University bylaws. Protective Services also operates the University's Safe Walk program, with which students can request an escort from officers.

== Symbols of the university ==
=== Coat of arms ===
Coat of arms

The university's coat of arms was first devised in 1908. It was decided the arms would be based on those of the University of Oxford with the university's motto inscribed on a book. Oxford blue became Saskatchewan green and Oxford's three crowns became garbs from Saskatchewan's coat of arms.

The arms were used in this manner for several decades until 1978 when a petition was submitted to the English College of Arms to obtain an official grant from the Crown. The grant was approved and the university obtained a letters patent authorizing official use of the arms.

In 1993, the university petitioned the Canadian Heraldic Authority for a Canadian grant of arms, and a modification to the blazon to describe the book as argent rather than proper. The Canadian grant was approved in 2001.

=== School songs ===
The University of Saskatchewan's fight song "Saskatchewan, Our University", was written by Russell Hopkins in 1939. Hopkins was notable in the university community at the time, and won a Rhodes Scholarship in 1932. The fight song is commonly played at sporting events.

== Indigenization, Reconciliation and Decolonization ==
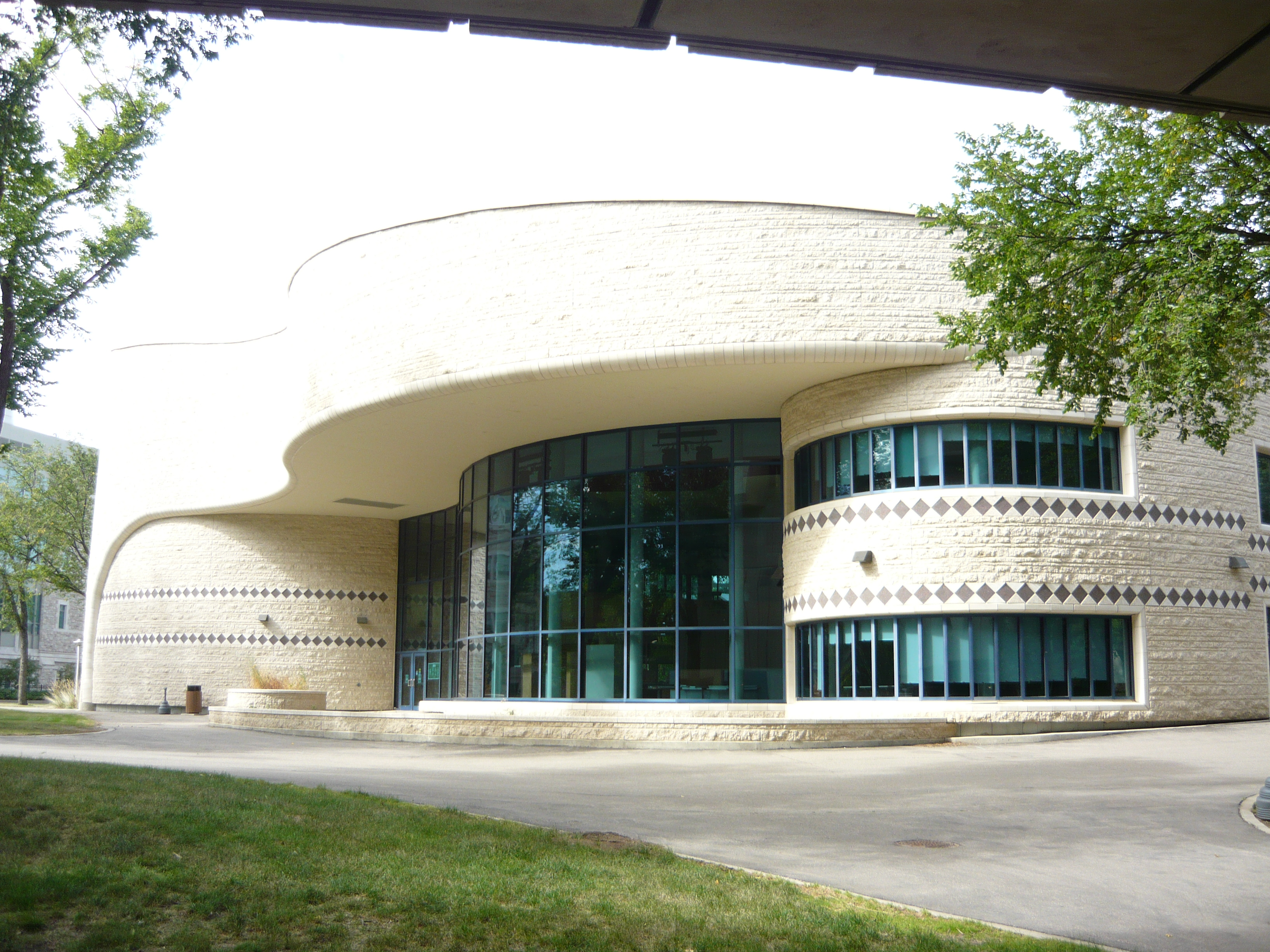
Gordon Oakes Red Bear Student Centre

In 2017, the University of Saskatchewan appointed Dr. Jacqueline Ottmann as the Vice Provost Indigenous Engagement.

The university provides services to Indigenous people in more remote communities. The University of Saskatchewan Summer University Transition Course brings first-year Indigenous students to campus before the start of the school year for some campus orientation. Academic counsellors, tutors and elders are present on campus to provide academic and social supports.

=== Science outreach Kamskénow program ===
The science outreach Kamskénow program runs out of the College of Arts and Science at the University of Saskatchewan. PotashCorp Kamskénow is a science outreach program that provides hands-on learning in Saskatoon classrooms based on each of the Division of Science disciplines at USask: biology, chemistry, computer science, geological sciences, mathematics and physics. Rather than a one-time school visit, the program offers students 12 weeks of classroom activities culminating in a trip to on-campus labs in week 13. All sessions are led by USask graduate and undergraduate students.

This program was chosen as the joint winner of the 2014 Science, Technology, Engineering and Math (STEM) Award for the North America region.

Additional funding for PotashCorp Kamskénow comes from NSERC, the Community Initiatives Fund, the College of Arts & Science and USask Community Engagement and Outreach.

== Students and alumni ==
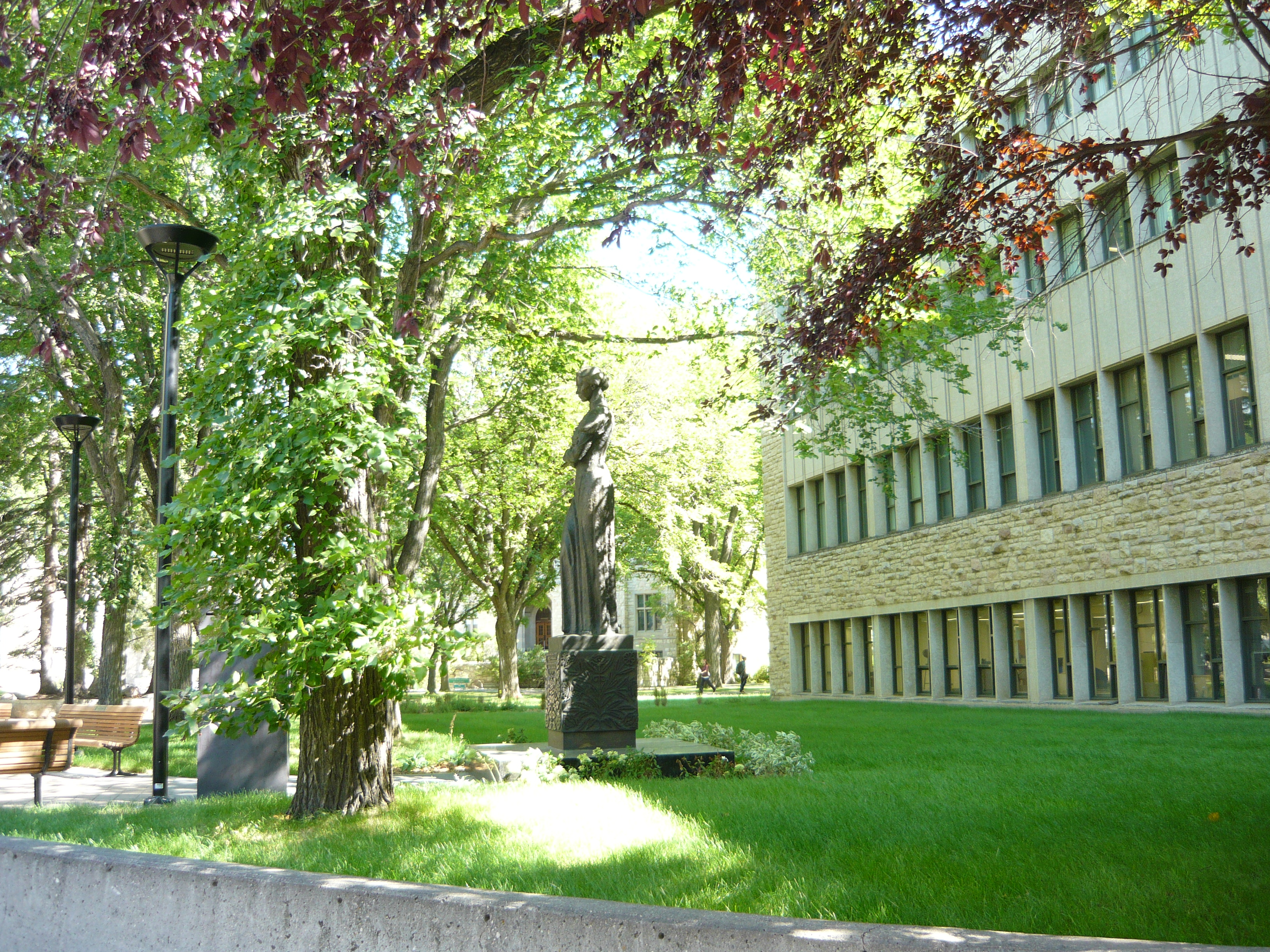
Ukrainian poet Lesya Ukrainka

Between 1907 and 2007, there were over 132,200 members of the University of Saskatchewan Alumni Association. The alumni feature those who have successfully graduated from a degree, certificate and/or diploma programme at the University of Saskatchewan.

=== Notable faculty and researchers ===
- Amira Abdelrasoul, associate professor of Chemical and Biomedical Engineering
- Ken Coates (1956–), historian, Canada Research Chair in Regional Innovation, Johnson-Shoyama Graduate School of Public Policy and director of the International Centre for Northern Governance and Development
- Sylvia Fedoruk, university chancellor, professor in oncology, associate member in physics, and lieutenant-governor of Saskatchewan (1988–1994)
- Paul Finkelman (1949–), historian and legal scholar, Ariel F. Sallows Visiting Professor of Human Rights Law
- Herbert V. Günther (1917–2006), Buddhist scholar and philosopher
- Gerhard Herzberg, Nobel Prize in Chemistry, 1970; offered a position in 1935 to flee Nazi Germany, and remained at the university for ten years
- Dorothy Howard, Professor Emeritus of music, and mezzo-soprano
- J.W. Grant MacEwan, director of the School of Agriculture, lieutenant-governor of Alberta (1966–1974)
- Hilda Neatby (1904–1975), historian
- Elizabeth Quinlan, sociologist
- William Sarjeant, geologist and novelist
- Thorbergur Thorvaldson, chemist and first dean of graduate studies at the university
- Carl L. von Baeyer, Professor Emeritus of psychology
- Curt Wittlin (1941–2019), philologist and expert in medieval literature

=== Notable alumni ===
- Noraini Ahmad, 16th Minister of Plantation and Commodities of Malaysia
- Anahita Akhavan, painter
- Lorne Babiuk, scientist
- Michael Byers, political scientist at the University of British Columbia and federal NDP candidate in the Vancouver Centre riding
- Alastair G. W. Cameron, astrophysicist
- Kenny Chiu, member of Parliament
- Kim Coates, actor
- Jonathan Denis, Alberta MLA and Minister of Housing and Urban Affairs (LLB, 2000)
- Grant Devine, 11th premier of Saskatchewan
- John Diefenbaker, 13th prime minister of Canada; also the university's chancellor; he and his wife were buried at the university, near the Diefenbaker Canada Centre
- N. Murray Edwards, business owner, co-owner of the Calgary Flames NHL franchise
- Edith Fowke, folklorist
- Sherine Gabriel, president of Rush University (Chicago)
- Agnes Gallus (1930–2010), painter
- Emmett Matthew Hall (1898–1995), Supreme Court judge and a father of the Canadian system of Medicare
- Lynda Haverstock, Lieutenant-Governor of Saskatchewan (2000–2006)
- John Hewson, Australian politician
- Ray Hnatyshyn, 24th governor general of Canada
- Andrew David Irvine, playwright and University of British Columbia professor
- Frederick W. Johnson, 16th Lieutenant-Governor of Saskatchewan
- Kaylyn Kyle Canada women's national soccer team player
- Woodrow Lloyd, 8th premier of Saskatchewan
- Peter Makaroff, Doukhobor peace activist
- Fred Mannering, professor University of South Florida, member of the U.S. National Academy of Engineering
- William McIntyre, former justice of the Supreme Court of Canada; authored the dissent in the landmark abortion case R. v. Morgentaler (1988)
- Scott Moe, 15th (and current) premier of Saskatchewan
- Permanand Mohan, senior computer science lecturer
- Carson Morrison, engineer
- Caia Morstad, volleyball player
- Cianna Murray, ice hockey referee
- Hilda Neatby (1904–1975), historian
- George Porteous, 14th lieutenant governor of Saskatchewan
- Zenon Pylyshyn (1937–2022), cognitive scientist and philosopher
- Alison Redford, 14th premier of Alberta
- Tracy A. Robinson, CEO of Canadian National Railway
- Ron Robison, commissioner of the Western Hockey League
- Terry Earl Robinson, Professor Emeritus of psychology & neuroscience
- Roy Romanow, 12th premier of Saskatchewan
- Lorna Russell, artist
- Nicole Sarauer, Saskchewan MLA and former leader of the Official Opposition
- Sandra Semchuk, photographic artist
- Henry Taube, Nobel Prize in Chemistry 1983
- Gordon Thiessen, former governor of the Bank of Canada
- Guy Vanderhaeghe (1951–), novelist, winner of the Governor General's Award, officer of the Order of Canada
- Carl L. von Baeyer, psychologist
- Brad Wall, 14th premier of Saskatchewan
- Rylan Wiens, Olympic diver

=== Rhodes Scholars ===
In all, 78 graduates of the University of Saskatchewan have gone on to receive the Rhodes Scholarship. These include Wilbur Jackett (1933) and Mark Abley (1975).
