= University of Saskatchewan College of Medicine =

Canadian medical school

Coordinates: 52.1312°N 106.6393°W

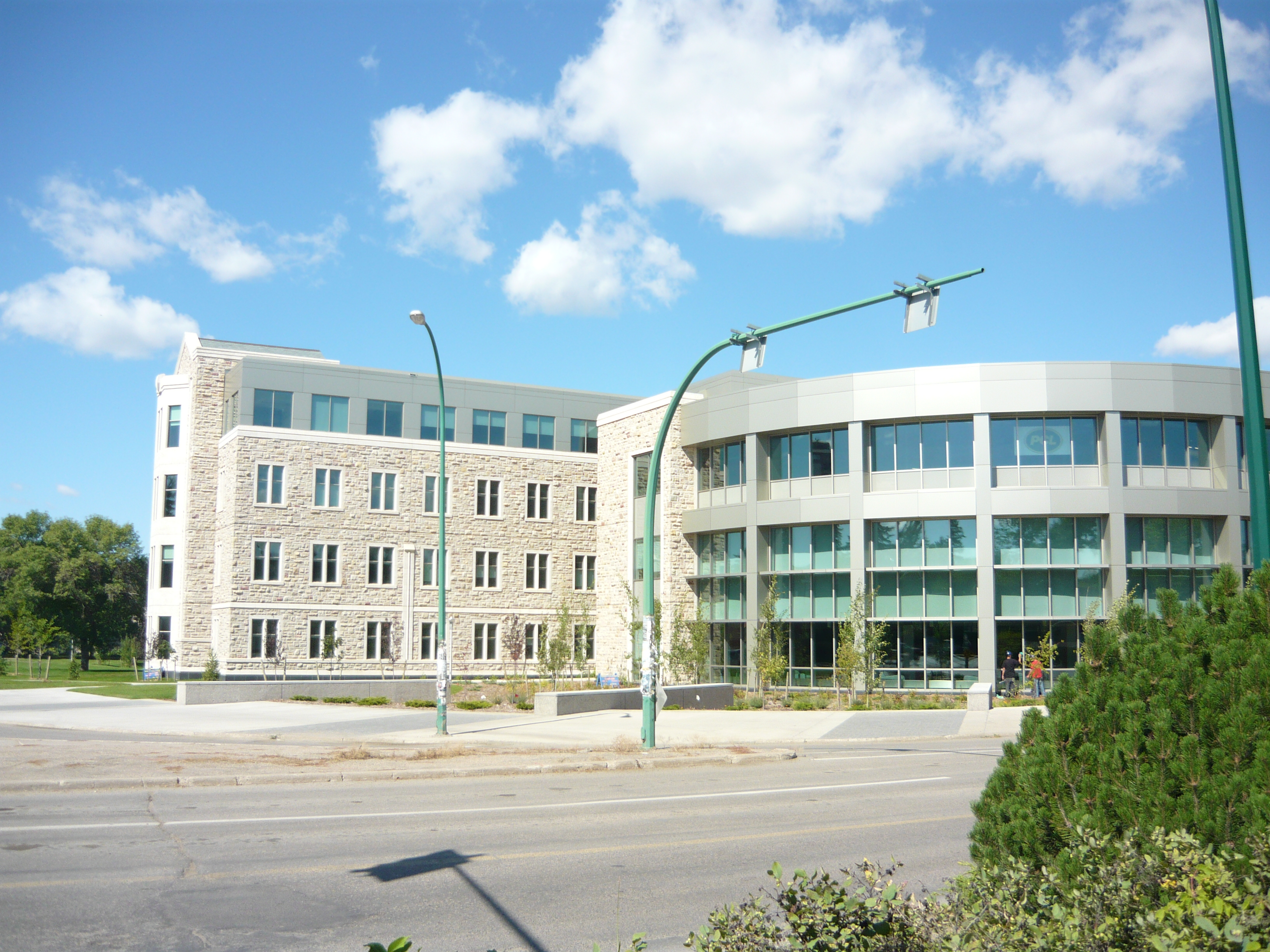
Health Sciences E Wing

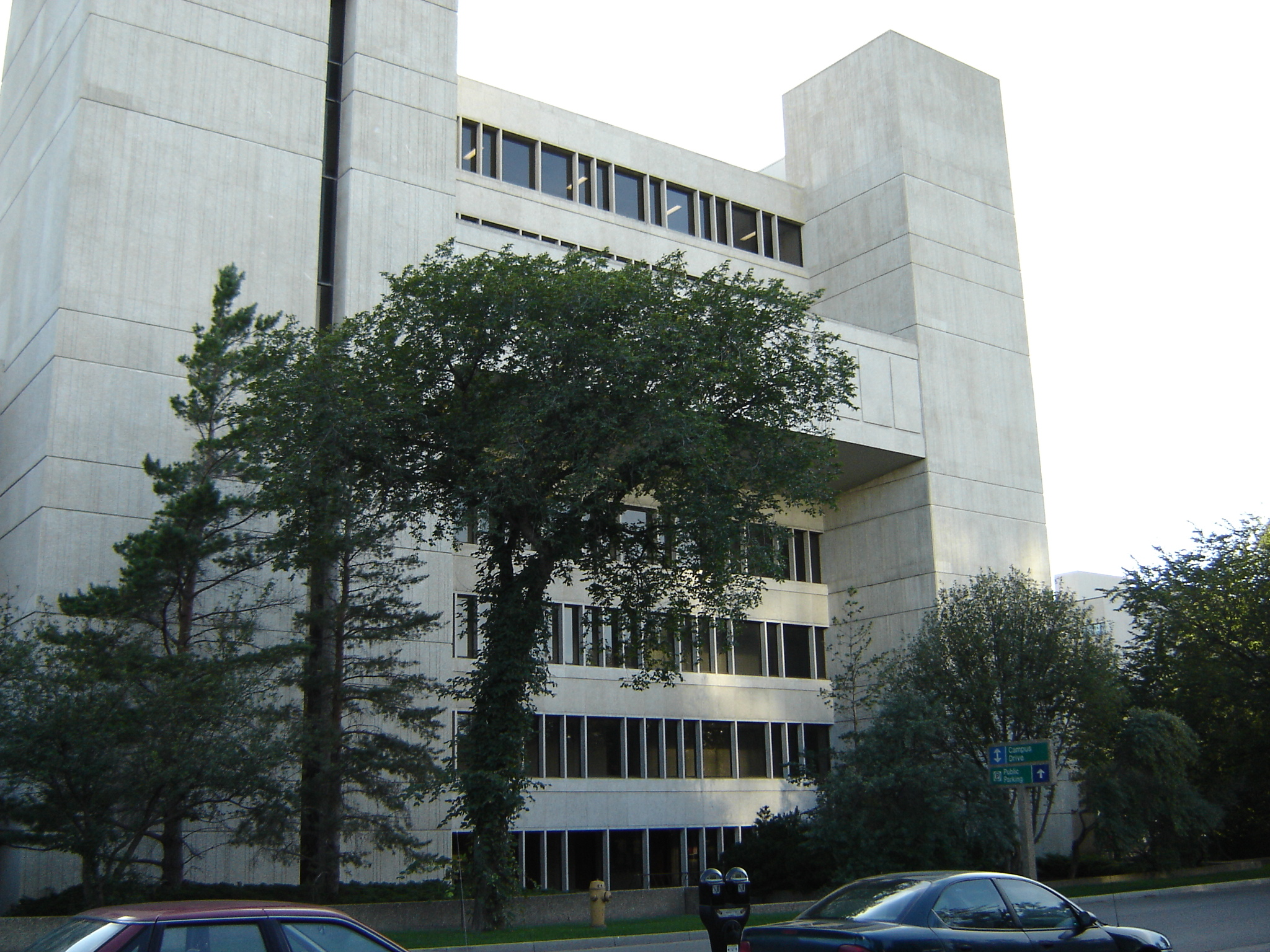
Health Sciences Building from Campus Drive

The College of Medicine of the University of Saskatchewan is the university's medical school. The school is located in Saskatoon. It is the only medical school in the Canadian province of Saskatchewan.

== Admissions ==
In 2014, there were 894 applicants for 100 spots in the M.D. program, with up to 90% of the class from Saskatchewan and up to 10% of the class from the rest of Canada.

== Organization ==
A list of departments in the college:

- Anatomy & Cell Biology
- Anesthesiology
- Biochemistry
- Community Health and Epidemiology
- Family Medicine
- Medical Imaging
- Medicine
- Microbiology
- Obstetrics & Gynecology
- Oncology/Radiology
- Ophthalmology
- Pathology
- Pediatrics
- Pharmacology
- Physiology
- Physical Medicine and Rehabilitation
- Psychiatry
- School of Physical Therapy
- Surgery

== #BeLikeBruce ==
World Pancreatic Day on November 19 is honoured with the #BeLikeBruce Memorial Pancreatic Cancer Research Fund established by Bruce Gordon's family which is housed at the College of Medicine, University of Saskatchewan.

== Affiliations ==
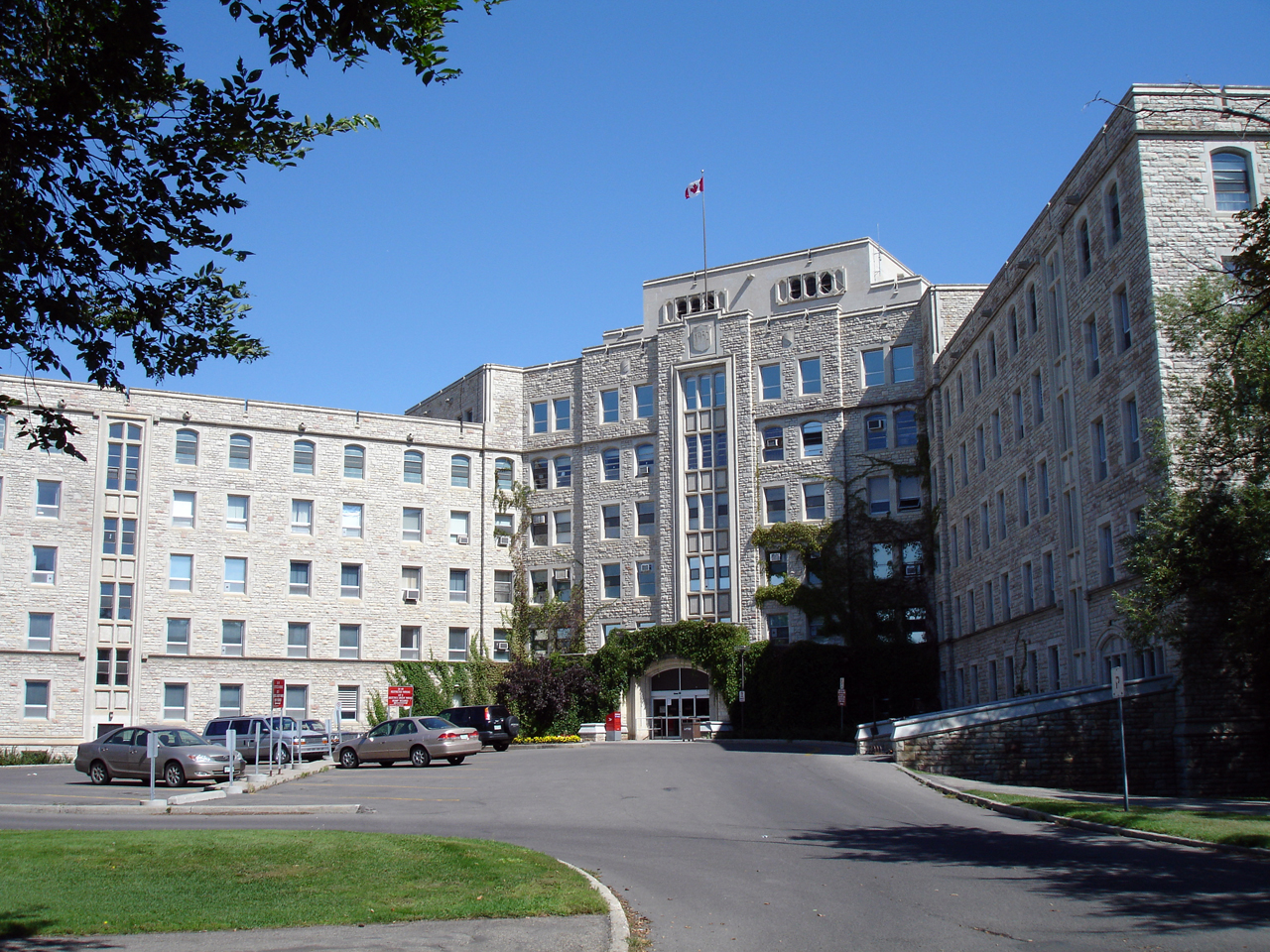
Royal University Hospital

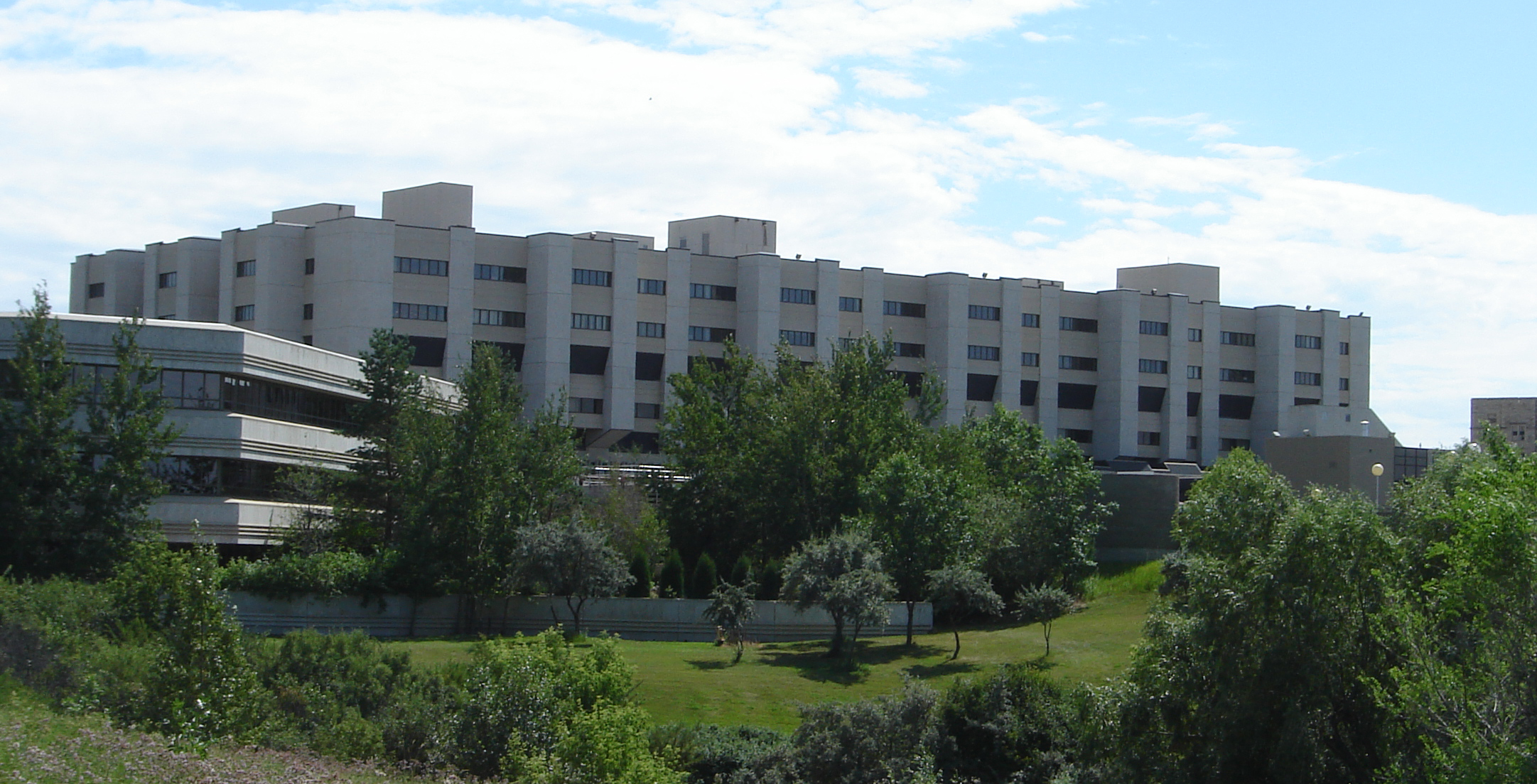
Royal University Hospital northern face

College of Medicine - University of Saskatchewan is linked to a number of organizations in the province:

- H.S. Computer Laboratory IHOR Continuing Medical Education
- Saskatchewan Stroke Research Centre Saskatoon Cancer Center Research Unit
- The Saskatchewan Neuroscience Network(SNN)
- Centre for Integrative Medicine

The college also offers:

- international programs - allowing students to further their studies abroad
- Aboriginal programs - Six spaces for first year students (Aboriginal Equity Program), Aboriginal Student Mentorship Program and Pre-Medicine Awards for Aboriginal Students (six awards per year).

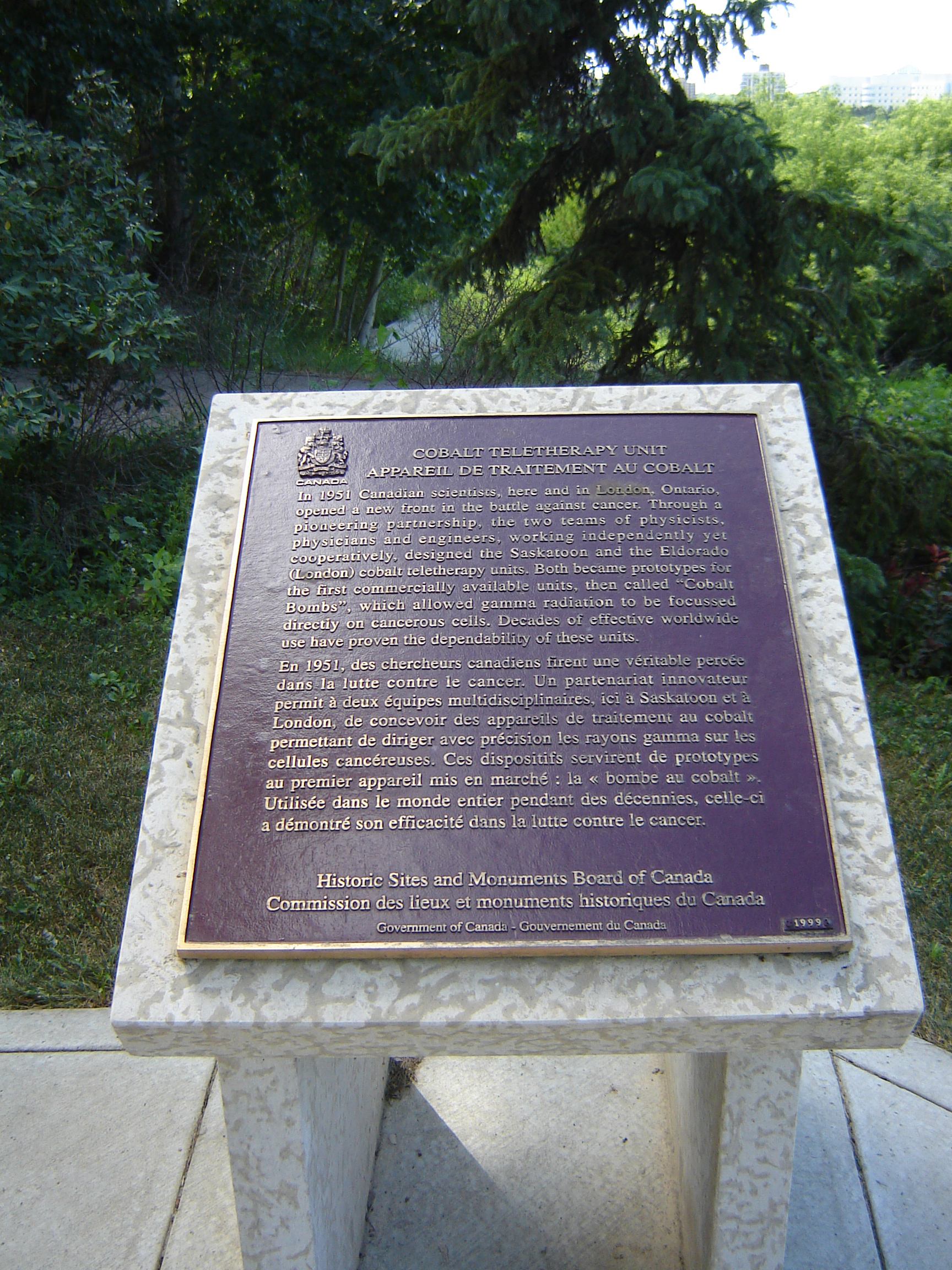
Cobalt Teletherapy Unit

== See also ==
- List of universities in Canada § Saskatchewan
- List of synchrotron radiation facilities
- University of Saskatchewan
- Vaccine and Infectious Disease Organization
