= University of Saskatchewan Graduate Students' Association =

- Institution: University of Saskatchewan
- Location: Saskatoon; Saskatchewan; Canada
- Established: 1992 (34 years ago)
- President: Kayla Benoit
- Vice presidents: Finances & Operations: Ramin Mohammadi; Student Affairs: Olusola Akintola; External: Abbas Fazel Anvari-Yazdi; Indigenous Liaison: Kayla Benoit
- Members: + 4,000
- Affiliations: Canadian Federation of Students
- Website: gsa.usask.ca

The University of Saskatchewan Graduate Students' Association (GSA-uSask or UofS-GSA) is the university-wide representative body for graduate students at the University of Saskatchewan, located in Saskatoon, Saskatchewan, Canada. It was established in 1985 as an office inside the University of Saskatchewan Students' Union (USSU), but it became an independent body only in 1992. Its head office is located at 1337 College Drive in the Emmanuel and St. Chad. The College of Emmanuel and St. Chad was designed by Webster, Forrester and Scott of Saskatoon and constructed in 1965 and 1966.

"The GSA Commons is located on Treaty 6 Territory and the Homeland of the Métis, and we pay our respect to the First Nations and Métis ancestors of this place and reaffirm our relationship with one another."

== History ==
In 1883 by an Act of Parliament, Emmanuel College was incorporated as “The University of Saskatchewan.”

In 1984-85, it was created inside the USSU (University of Saskatchewan Students' Union), a group to handle issues specifically related to graduate students in the University of Saskatchewan.

In 1992, this group became an independent body, called University of Saskatchewan Graduate Students' Association. The GSA-uSask is a not-for-profit student organization that provides services, events, student clubs and advocacy work to the graduate students of University of Saskatchewan.

In the fall of 2006, the Emmanuel and St. Chad space earmarked for GSA-uSask.

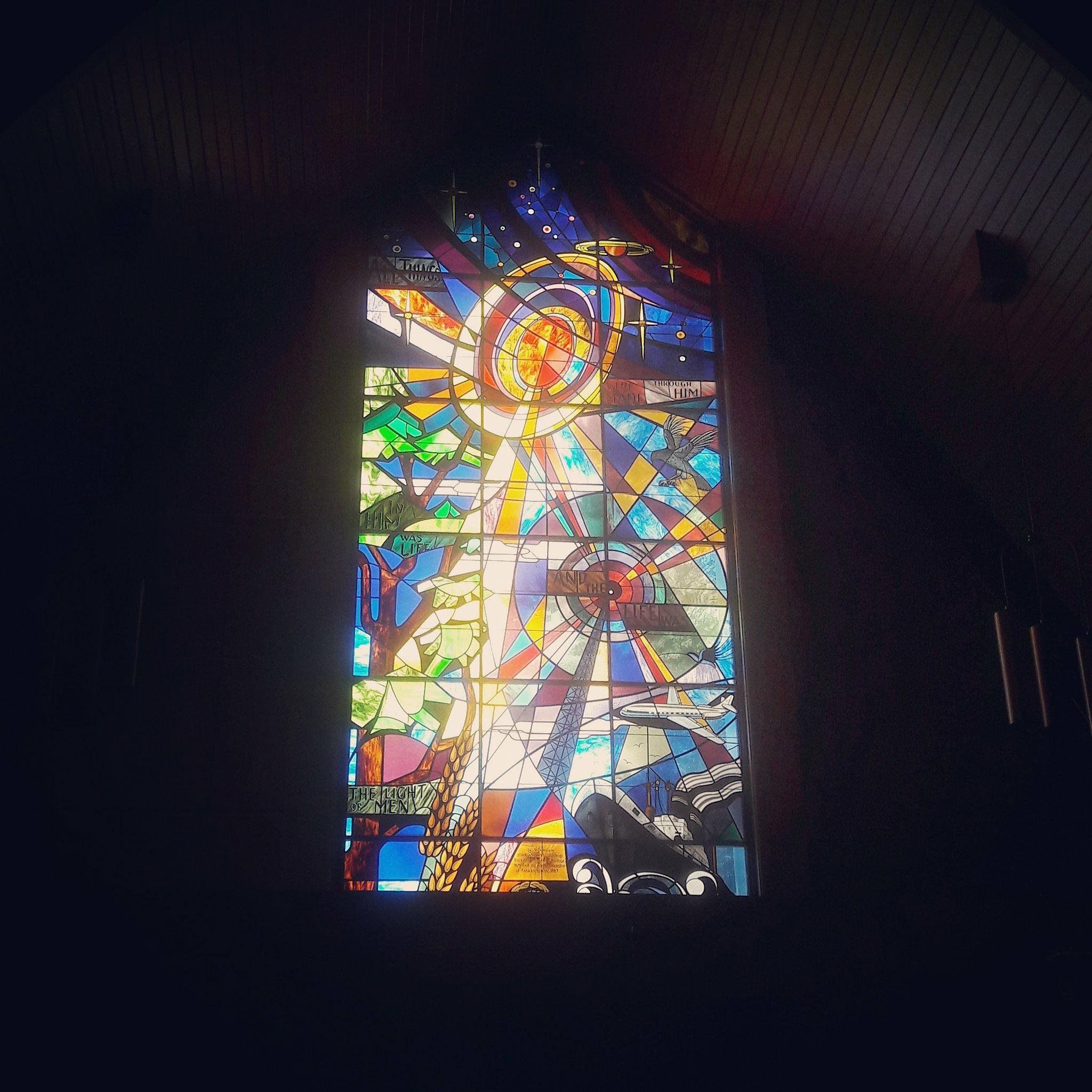
Stained glass in the GSA Commons, Emmanuel and St. Chad Chapel

Since 2016-17, the GSA has asked for a seat on the U of S Board of Governors. The Board is responsible for overseeing matters on management, administration and control of the university's property and financial affairs. Currently, the U of S is the only university in the U15 group that does not have a seat for graduate students on the board. Although changes on the composition of the board depends on University of Saskatchewan Act's amendments (within the scope of the Provincial Legislature), recent support by the University Council is an indication that not only the graduate students consider this an important cause.

In 2021, amid the COVID-19 pandemic, the GSA and the PSAC Local 40004 — which represents U of S graduate students who work as teaching, research and student assistants — created a petition to oppose the tuition increase proposed by the U of S. Another increase to the differential rate of 14.6%, from 1.58 to 1.81, will have a greater effect on international students. The projected tuition for this group will rise from $2,243 to $2,698.71 — an increase of about 20%.

=== GSA Commons ===
Since 2007, Emmanuel and St. Chad Chapel holds the GSA-uSask headquarters, also referred as GSA Commons. The chapel was de-consecrated by a multi-faith opening ceremony.

== Governance ==
The governance of the University of Saskatchewan Graduate Students' Association is shared among three bodies: the executive committee; the Council; and the Board of Directors.

- Executive committee: members of the University of Saskatchewan Graduate Students' Association elected by their peers for a one-year-long term of office.
- GSA Council: composed of academic units' representatives, chosen in their departments by their own rules. All graduate programs should have at least one representative in the monthly GSA Council meetings.
- Board of Directors: Defined in the GSA Bylaws.

=== Academic units ===
- Engineering Graduate Community Council (EGCC), College of Engineering
- Indigenous Graduate Students' Council (IGSC)
- Physics and Engineering Physics GSA Council at the U of S (PEGASUS), College of Engineering
- Saskatchewan Agricultural Graduates Association (SAGA), College of Agriculture and Bioresources
- Soil Science GSA, College of Agriculture and Bioresources
- WCVM GSA, Western College of Veterinary Medicine

== Student clubs ==
The student clubs in the University of Saskatchewan may be ratified by the USSU and/or ratified by the GSA. Clubs may be related to cultural backgrounds (students from other countries), professional associations, sustainability groups, religious studies, sports and more.

== Offered services ==
- Health and dental plan
- U-Pass
- Bursaries
- ISIC cards

== Previous executive members ==
| Academic year | President | VP Finances | VP Operations | VP Student Affairs | VP academic | VP External Affairs | Indigenous Liaison |
|---|---|---|---|---|---|---|---|
| 2021-22 | Rifat Zahan | Ehsan Moradi | Ehsan Moradi | Olusola Akintola/Mostofa Kamal | Olusola Akintola/Mostofa Kamal | Leslie Tetteh/Devin Cherneski | Tina Alexis/- |
| 2020-21 | Humaira Inam | Hadi Ramin/Emerita Mendoza | Hadi Ramin/Emerita Mendoza | Carmen Marquez | Carmen Marquez | Qasim Gill | Tina Alexis (Dakelh) |
| 2019-20 | Emerita Mendoza Rengifo | Mohammad Wajih Alam | Mohammad Wajih Alam | Alejandra Fonseca | - | Chiamaka Ezekwesili | - |
| 2018-19 | Naheda Sahtout | Jesus Corona Gomez | Jesus Corona Gomez | Edgar Martinez-Soberanes | - | Somto Ufondu | Marie-Eve Presber |
| 2017-18 | Ziad Ghaith | David Bennett | David Bennett | Ali Kiani | - | Naheda Sahtout | Iloradanon Efimoff |
| 2016-17 | Ziad Ghaith | Kusum Sharma | Nafisa Absher | Shailza Sapal | Ali Kiani | Carolyn Gaspar | Dana Carriere |
| 2015-16 | Rajat Chakravarty | David Bennett | Ziad Ghaith | Hardi Shahadu | Jebunnessa Chapola | Natalia Terekhova | Dana Carriere |
| 2014-15 | Izabela Vlahu | Mohammad Rafati | Xin Lu | Rajat Chakravarty | Ranjan Datta | Rahwa Osman | Dana Carriere |
| 2013-14 | Ehimai Ohiozebau | Mohammad Rafati | Kiri Staples | Reanne Ridsdale | Izabela Vlahu | Steve Jimbo | Dana Carriere |
| 2012-13 | Ehimai Ohiozebau | John McLeod | Maily Huynh | Steve Jimbo | Dylan Beach | Elizabeth O’Meara | Nicole Callihoo |
