= Peter MacKinnon Building =

National Historic Site of Canada, Saskatchewan

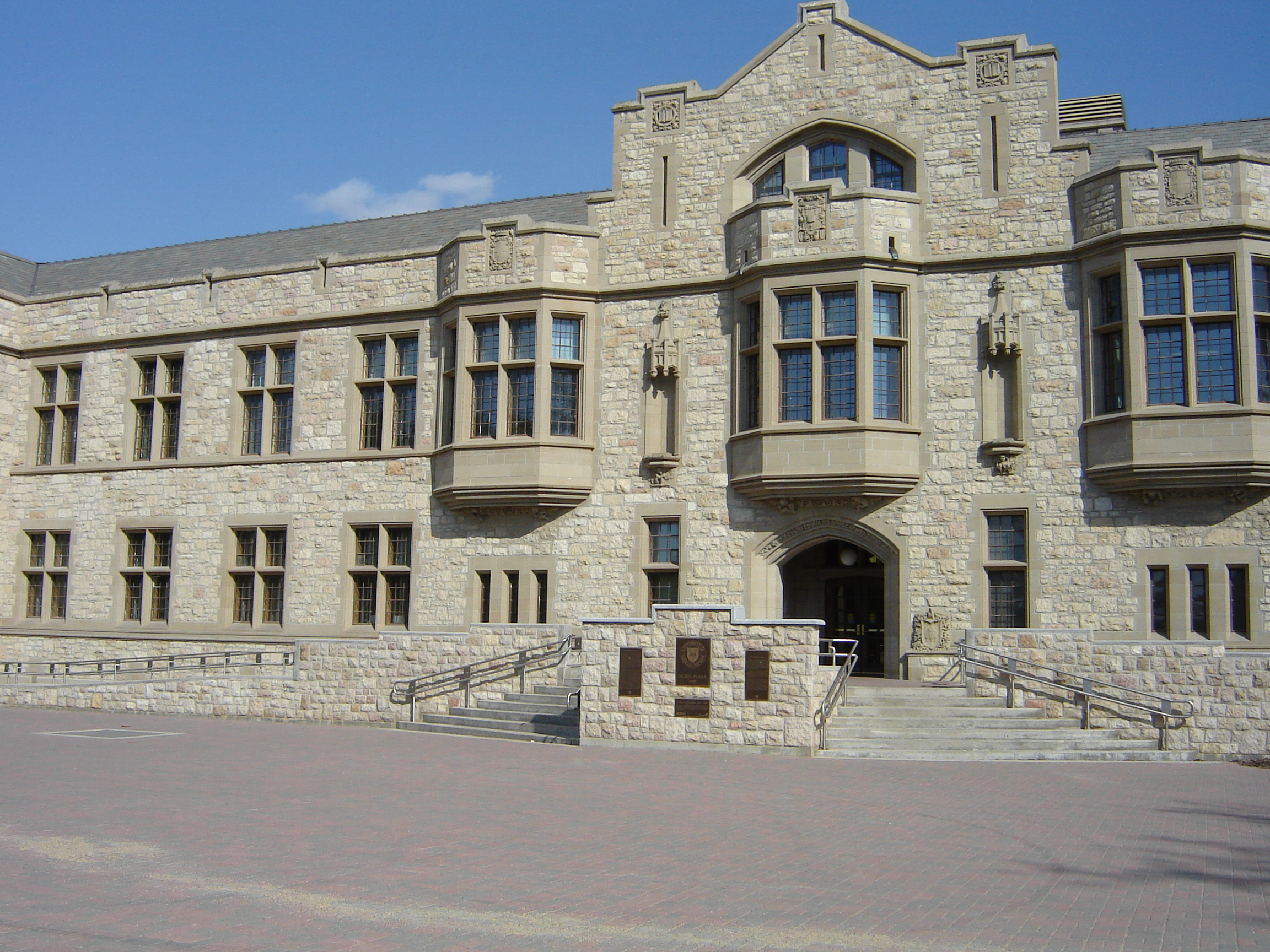
- College Building
- Interactive map of the Peter MacKinnon Building area

General information
- Architectural style: Collegiate Gothic
- Location: Saskatoon, Saskatchewan, Canada
- Coordinates: 52°7′50.41″N 106°37′57.526″W
- Construction started: 1910
- Completed: 1913
- Cost: $297,000
- Client: University of Saskatchewan

Design and construction
- Architects: Brown and Vallance

National Historic Site of Canada
- Official name: College Building National Historic Site of Canada
- Designated: 2001

Saskatchewan Heritage Property Act
- Official name: College Building, University of Saskatchewan
- Type: Provincial Heritage Property
- Designated: November 24, 1982

The Peter MacKinnon Building is a National Historic Site of Canada which is part of the University of Saskatchewan (U of S). The U of S is the largest education institution in the Canadian province of Saskatchewan. The structure is an example of a university building in the classic Elizabethan E shape in Collegiate Gothic style which was designed by Brown and Vallance.

This style is also seen at Cambridge, and Oxford and American universities such as Princeton. Strathcona Medical Building at McGill University was another collegiate gothic style campus building, also designed by Vallance & Brown, as well as Hart House at the University of Toronto. In 1909, Montreal architects named Vallance & Brown designed the University of Saskatchewan Campus. They set out six college gothic style residential and college buildings around a green space which has come to be known as The Bowl

The University of Saskatchewan location next to the South Saskatchewan River was across from the city centre of Saskatoon. Prime Minister of Canada Sir Wilfrid Laurier laid the cornerstone of the first under construction building on campus, the College Building, on July 29, 1910. The original buildings were built using native limestone - greystone - which was mined just north of campus. Over the years, the greystone was to become one of the most recognizable campus signatures. When the local supply of limestone was exhausted, the University turned to Tyndall Stone, so called because it is quarried at Tyndall, Manitoba. The College Building, officially opened May 1, 1913. This building had the first cornerstone laid in 1910, but was not the first building on campus. However the Professor of Field Husbandry residence, finished construction in 1911, and the Dean of Agriculture residence, now the Faculty Club, finished construction in 1912. In 2001, it was declared a National Historic Site of Canada.

Gargoyles, oriel windows, and a gothic arch decorate the two storey façade. It had to be shut down in 1997 to undergo restoration. Cochrane Engineering and Friggstad Downing architects completed the construction and the College building was reopened 2005. The College building originally contained the Nobel Plaza, second floor Memorial Plaques, machinery toom and convocation hall and now houses two art galleries and a museum. The first rooms were used for students pursuing a Degree in Agriculture and they could learn to test milk, make butter and ripen cheese. The Honourable Lorne Calvert, Premier of Saskatchewan and U of S President, Peter MacKinnon rededicated the College Building September 6, 2005. It has official designation as both a National Historic Site and a provincial heritage property, The building was renamed in honour of MacKinnon in 2012.

== See also ==
- University of Saskatchewan
- Gothic Revival architecture in Canada
