= American Pain Society =

- Formation: March 6, 1977
- Dissolved: June 2019
- Type: Multidisciplinary community of scientists, clinicians and other professionals
- Headquarters: 8735 W. Higgins Road, Suite 300, Chicago, IL 60631
- Members: >2,500
- Official language: English
- President: Roger Fillingim, PhD
- Key people: Chief Executive Officer: Carly Reisner
- Website: https://web.archive.org/web/20190829194735/http://americanpainsociety.org/

The American Pain Society (APS) was a professional membership organization and a national chapter of the International Association for the Study of Pain (IASP). The organization closed in 2019 amid the opioid epidemic as the organization faced allegations that it colluded with opioid producers to promote opioids.

== History ==
Around the time of Purdue Pharma releasing OxyContin into the market in 1996, the society introduced "pain as 5th vital sign" campaign. APS was reported to be one of several nonprofit groups that advocated use of opioid painkillers contributing to the Opioid epidemic in the United States.

In June 2019, the APS was forced to close amid allegations that it colluded with pharmaceutical companies producing opioids. The APS claimed that the reason for the bankruptcy was the numerous legal expenses which resulted from lawsuits claiming the organization was acting as a front group for opioid drugmakers. The Chronicle of Higher Education reported that several former APS members are organizing a new society called the U.S. Association for the Study of Pain.

== ACTTION-APS Pain Taxonomy ==
Together with The Analgesic, Anesthetic, and Addiction Clinical Trial Translations Innovations Opportunities and Networks (ACTTION) partnership with the FDA, the APS developed the ACTTION-APS Pain Taxonomy (AAPT) to provide a consistent diagnostic system for chronic pain disorders.

== Publications ==
The society's official journal was titled The Journal of Pain, and published by Elsevier. The society had issued a total of nine guidelines throughout its period of existence.
