= List of hospitals in Saskatchewan =

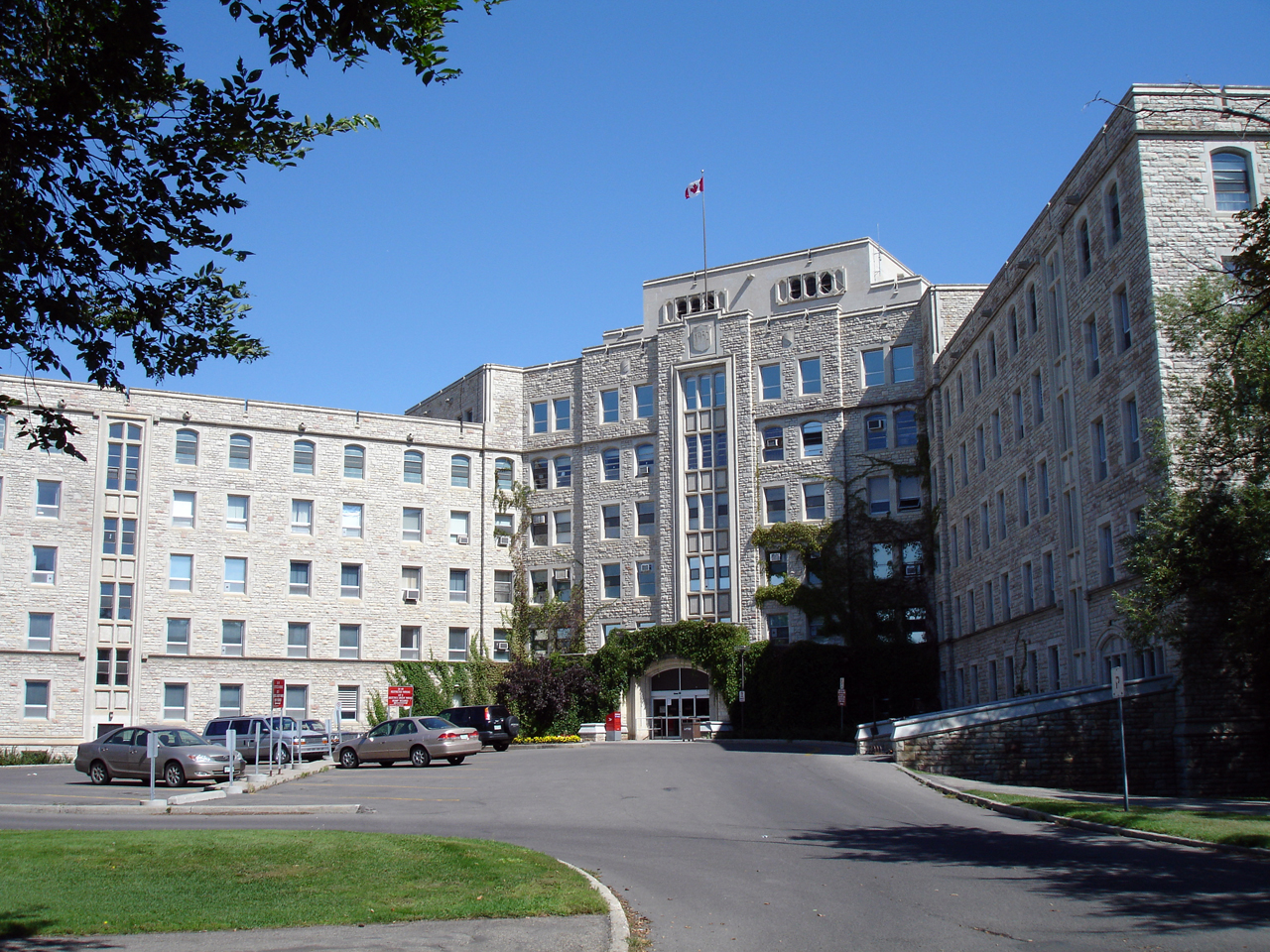
Royal University Hospital

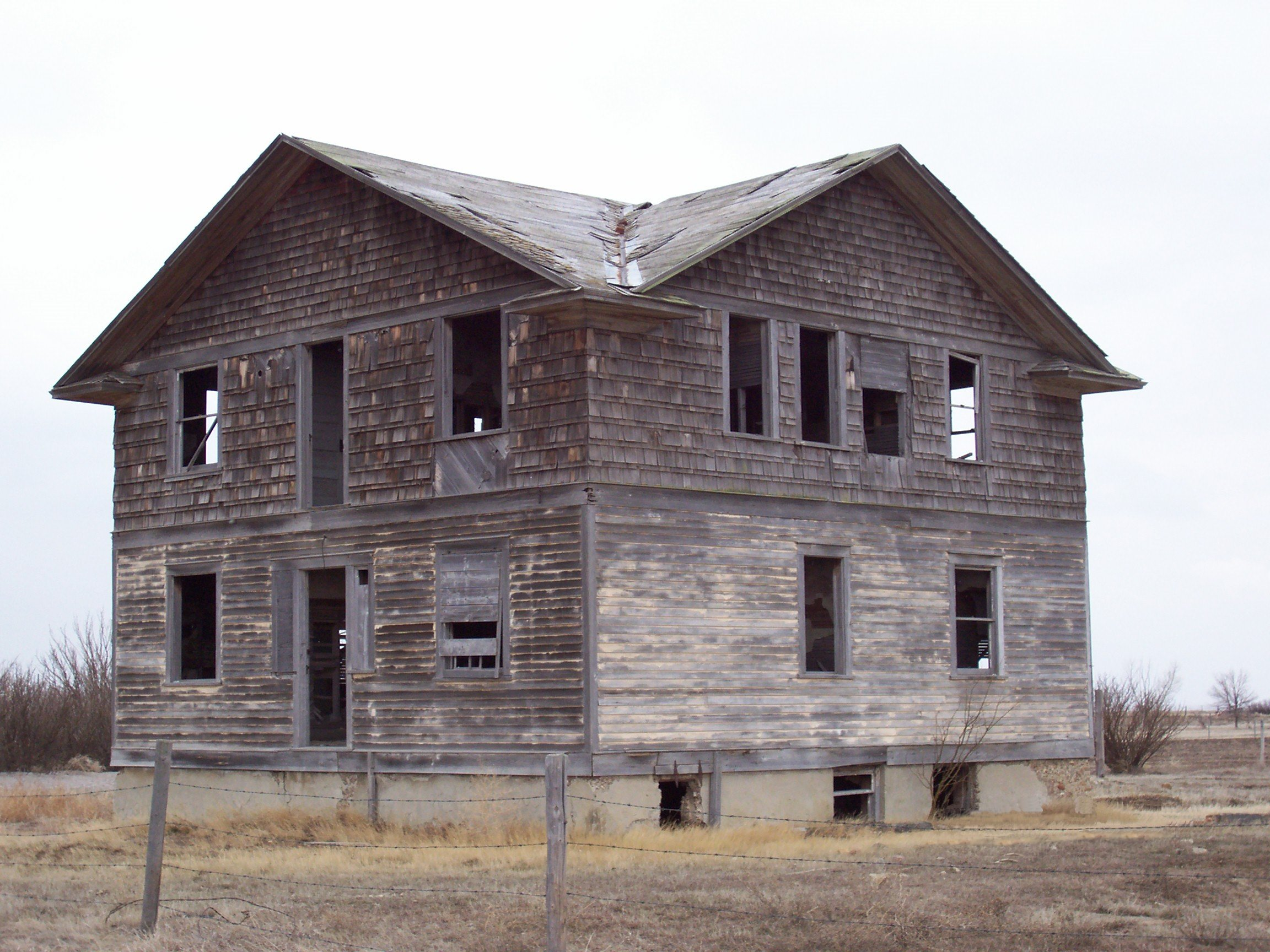
Robsart Hospital

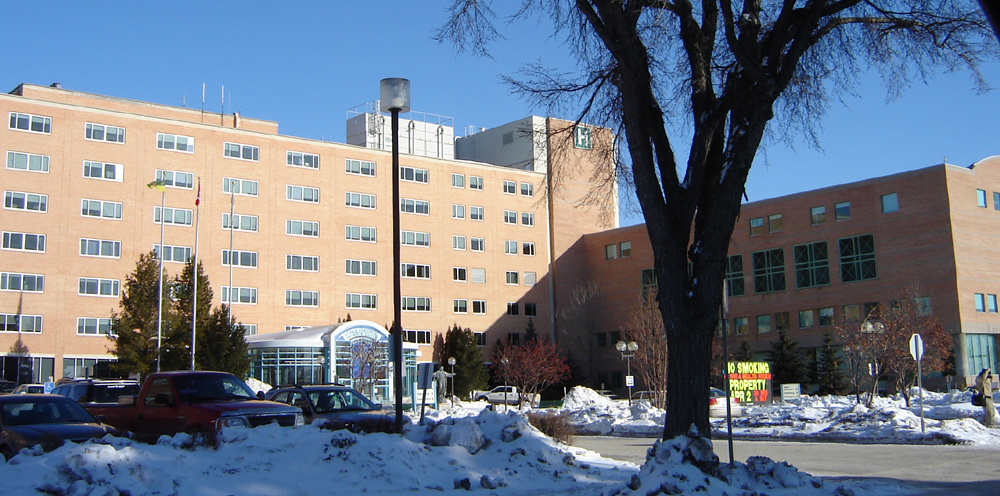
St. Paul's Hospital

This is a list of hospitals in Saskatchewan.

Facility name	Location	Coordinates	Former Health Region	Notes
All Nations' Healing Hospital	Fort Qu'Appelle		Regina Qu'Appelle	
Assiniboia Union Hospital	Assiniboia			
Balcarres Hospital	Balcarres		Regina Qu'Appelle	
Battlefords District Care Centre	Battleford		Prairie North	
Battlefords Union Hospital	North Battleford		Prairie North	
Biggar & District Health Centre	Biggar		Heartland	
Big River Hospital	Big River		Prince Albert Parkland	
Broadview Union Hospital	Broadview		Regina Qu'Appelle	
Canora Hospital	Canora			
Cut Knife Health Complex	Cut Knife		Prairie North	
Cypress Regional Hospital	Swift Current		Cypress	
Dr. F. H. Wigmore Regional Hospital	Moose Jaw		Fice Hills	
Fort San Sanatorium	Fort San	50°48′01″N 103°49′07″W	Anti-Tuberculosis League	defunct hospital
Humboldt District Hospital	Humboldt		Saskatoon	
Indian Head Hospital	Indian Head		Regina Qu'Appelle	
Indian Hospital	Fort Qu'Appelle		Regina Qu'Appelle	defunct
Jim Pattison Children's Hospital	Saskatoon		Saskatoon	
Kamsack Union Hospital	Kamsack		Sunrise Health Region	
L. Gervais Memorial Health Centre	Goodsoil		Prairie North	
Lady Minto Health Care Center	Edam		Prairie North	
La Ronge Health Center	La Ronge		Mamawetan Churchill River	
Lanigan Hospital	Lanigan	50°26′36″N 104°36′3″W	Saskatoon	
Leader Hospital	Leader		Cypress	
Lloydminster Hospital	Lloydminster		Prairie North	
Maidstone Hospital	Maidstone		Prairie North	
Northwest Health Facility/Meadow Lake Hospital	Meadow Lake		Prairie North	
Pasqua Hospital	Regina	50°27′14″N 104°38′22″W	Regina Qu'Appelle	
Regina General Hospital	Regina	50°26′36″N 104°36′3″W	Regina Qu'Appelle	
Robsart Hospital	Robsart	49°23′24″N 109°15′0″W		
Rosthern Hospital	Rosthern		Saskatoon	
Royal University Hospital	Saskatoon	52°07′54″N 106°38′29″W	Saskatoon	teaching
Saskatchewan Hospital	North Battleford	52°44′14″N 108°15′37″W	Prairie North	psychiatric
Saskatoon City Hospital	Saskatoon	52°08′8″N 106°39′12″W	Saskatoon	
Saskatoon Sanatorium	Saskatoon	52°06′30″N 106°41′12″W	Anti-Tuberculosis League	defunct hospital
Souris Valley Mental Health Hospital (Weyburn Mental Hospital)	Weyburn	49°40′0″N 103°51′0″W		defunct hospital
Southeast Integrated Care Centre	Moosomin		Regina Qu'Appelle	
Southwest Integrated Healthcare Facility	Maple Creek		Cypress	
St. Joseph's Hospital	Estevan		Sun Country	
St. Joseph's Hospital and Health Centre	Île-à-la-Crosse		Keewatin Yatthé	
St. Joseph's Integrated Care Centre	Lestock		Regina Qu'Appelle	
St. Paul's Hospital	Saskatoon	52°07′37″N 106°41′45″W	Saskatoon	
Victoria Hospital	Prince Albert		Prince Albert Parkland	
Wadena Hospital	Wadena		Saskatoon	
Wakaw Union Hospital	Wakaw		Saskatoon	
Watrous Hospital	Watrous			
Weyburn General Hospital	Weyburn		Sun Country	
Wolseley Memorial Hospital	Wolseley		Regina Qu'Appelle	
Wynyard Hospital	Wynyard		Saskatoon	
