= Museum of Antiquities =

Museum of Antiquities may refer to:

- Museum of Antiquities (Algiers)
- Museum of Antiquities (Newcastle upon Tyne)
- Museum of Antiquities (Saskatoon)
- Museum of Antiquities (Turin)
- Museum of Egyptian Antiquities, Cairo
- Museum of Antiquities of the University of Leipzig
- Museum of Antiquities in Vilnius

== See also ==
- National Museum of Antiquities (disambiguation)
