= Tracene Harvey =

Tracene Harvey is the author of Julia Augusta: Images of Rome's First Empress on Coins of the Roman Empire. As of 2019, the book was the most comprehensive examination of the image of the Roman Empress, Julia Augusta, also known as Livia or Livia Drusilla, in existing Roman coins. Harvey is also the curator of the Museum of Antiquities (Saskatoon) at the University of Saskatchewan, Saskatoon, Saskatchewan, Canada.

== Background ==
=== Education ===
Harvey graduated with a Bachelor of Arts and Master of Arts in Classics and Ancient History from the University of Saskatchewan. She then obtained a PhD in Classical Archaeology from the University of Alberta, Edmonton, Alberta, Canada.

=== Professional career ===
Harvey became the director of the University of Saskatchewan, Museum of Antiquities (Saskatoon) in 2009. The museum houses plaster cast replicas, the only museum of its kind in Saskatchewan and one of only a few in Canada, as well as antiquities including one of the few known busts of Hannibal. The bust was previously owned by Napoleon. She specializes in ancient Greek and Roman coins and is the numismatics specialist for the Kastro Kallithea Archaeological Project in Thessaly Greece, supported by the 15th Ephorate of Prehistorical and Classical Antiquities at Larissa, Greece and the University of Alberta.

=== Publications ===
Harvey is the author of Julia Augusta: Images of Rome's First Empress on Coins of the Roman Empire, insightful as one of the first investigations into "images on Roman coins as gender-infused designs, which created a visual dialogue regarding Livia's power and gender-roles in relation to those of male members of the imperial family. While the appearance of Roman women on coins was not entirely revolutionary, having roughly coincided with the introduction of images of powerful Roman statesmen to coins in the late 40s BC, the degree to which Livia came to be commemorated on coins in the provinces and in Rome was unprecedented."
