= North Battleford Crown Colony =

Community in Saskatchewan, Canada

- Unincorporated community (census subdivision)
- Location within Saskatchewan
- Coordinates: 52.735°N 108.261°W
- Country: Canada
- Province: Saskatchewan
- Region: Saskatchewan
- Census division: 12
- Rural municipality: North Battleford No. 437

Area
  - Land: 1.26 km^{2} (0.49 sq mi)

Population (2011)
  - Total: 164
  - Density: 130.4/km^{2} (338/sq mi)
- Time zone: UTC−6 (Central Standard Time)
- Waterways: North Saskatchewan River

The North Battleford Crown Colony (2011 population 164) is an unincorporated community within the Rural Municipality of North Battleford No. 437 in Saskatchewan, Canada, that is designated a census subdivision by Statistics Canada. It is adjacent to the city of North Battleford and is home to the Saskatchewan Hospital North Battleford.

== Geography ==
Located within the Rural Municipality of North Battleford No. 437, the North Battleford Crown Colony census subdivision shares a boundary with the city of North Battleford to the north and east and is located on the northeast shore of the North Saskatchewan River. The town of Battleford is across the river to the west while the Rural Municipality of Battle River No. 438 is across the river to the south.

== Demographics ==
In the 2021 Census of Population conducted by Statistics Canada, the North Battleford Crown Colony had a population of 104 living in 0 of its 0 total private dwellings, a change of −32.5% from its 2016 population of 154. With a land area of 1.27 km^{2} (0.49 sq mi), it had a population density of 81.9/km^{2} (212.1/sq mi) in 2021.

In the 2011 Census of Population conducted by Statistics Canada, the North Battleford Crown Colony recorded a population of 164 living in 5 of its 8 total private dwellings, a 7.2% change from its 2006 population of 153. With a land area of 1.26 km^{2} (0.49 sq mi), it had a population density of 130.2/km^{2} (337.1/sq mi) in 2011.

Canada census – North Battleford community profile

	2021	2011
Population	104 (-32.5% from 2016)	164 (7.2% from 2006)
Land area	1.27 km^{2} (0.49 sq mi)	1.26 km^{2} (0.49 sq mi)
Population density	82/km^{2} (210/sq mi)	130.4/km^{2} (338/sq mi)
Median age	42.4 (M: 46.4, F: 41.6)	46.5 (M: 46.5, F: 46.5)
Private dwellings	0 (total)	8 (total)
Median household income

References: 2021 2011

== Health care ==
The North Battleford Crown Colony is home to the Saskatchewan Hospital North Battleford, a mental health centre, which is located at 1 Jersey Street. It is administered by the Prairie North Health Region. The hospital currently has 252 beds, though a replacement hospital is currently under construction that will ultimately have 284 beds once construction is completed in spring of 2018.

== See also ==
- List of communities in Saskatchewan
