= Saskatchewan Hospital =

Geography
- Location: Box 39, North Battleford, Saskatchewan, Canada

Organization
- Care system: Public
- Type: Mental health
- Network: Prairie North Health Region and Saskatchewan Health Authority

Services
- Beds: 284

History
- Founded: 2019

Links
- Website: https://www.pnrha.ca/programs_services/Pages/Saskatchewan-Hospital---North-Battleford.aspx
- Lists: Hospitals in Canada

Saskatchewan Hospital North Battleford (SHNB) is a public psychiatric hospital in North Battleford, Saskatchewan. It is owned by the Government of Saskatchewan and operated by the Saskatchewan Health Authority. The facility has 284 beds in total, including a 96-bed secure unit for offenders with mental health needs. The new facility includes a number of modernizations to improve patient care, including:

- 32 more beds (an increase from 156 to 188),
- A "home-like" rather than institutional atmosphere,
- Scenic placement on the North Saskatchewan River with maximized views of nature from inside, and
- A cogeneration system to reduce its environmental footprint.

The project was announced in 2011 and began construction in September 2015. It held its grand opening March 14, 2019.

The Government of Saskatchewan committed $407 million to the project, which covers design, construction, and 30 years of maintenance. Of this, approximately $222 million is attributable to construction. The project is proceeding as a public-private partnership (P3). Financial analysis by Ernst & Young indicated a P3 would save $90 million (18%) over the life of the project, versus a typical government-led project. Design, construction, and maintenance are the responsibility of a group named Access Prairies Partnership, led by Graham. The construction effort created more than 1,500 jobs in the province.

== Original hospital ==
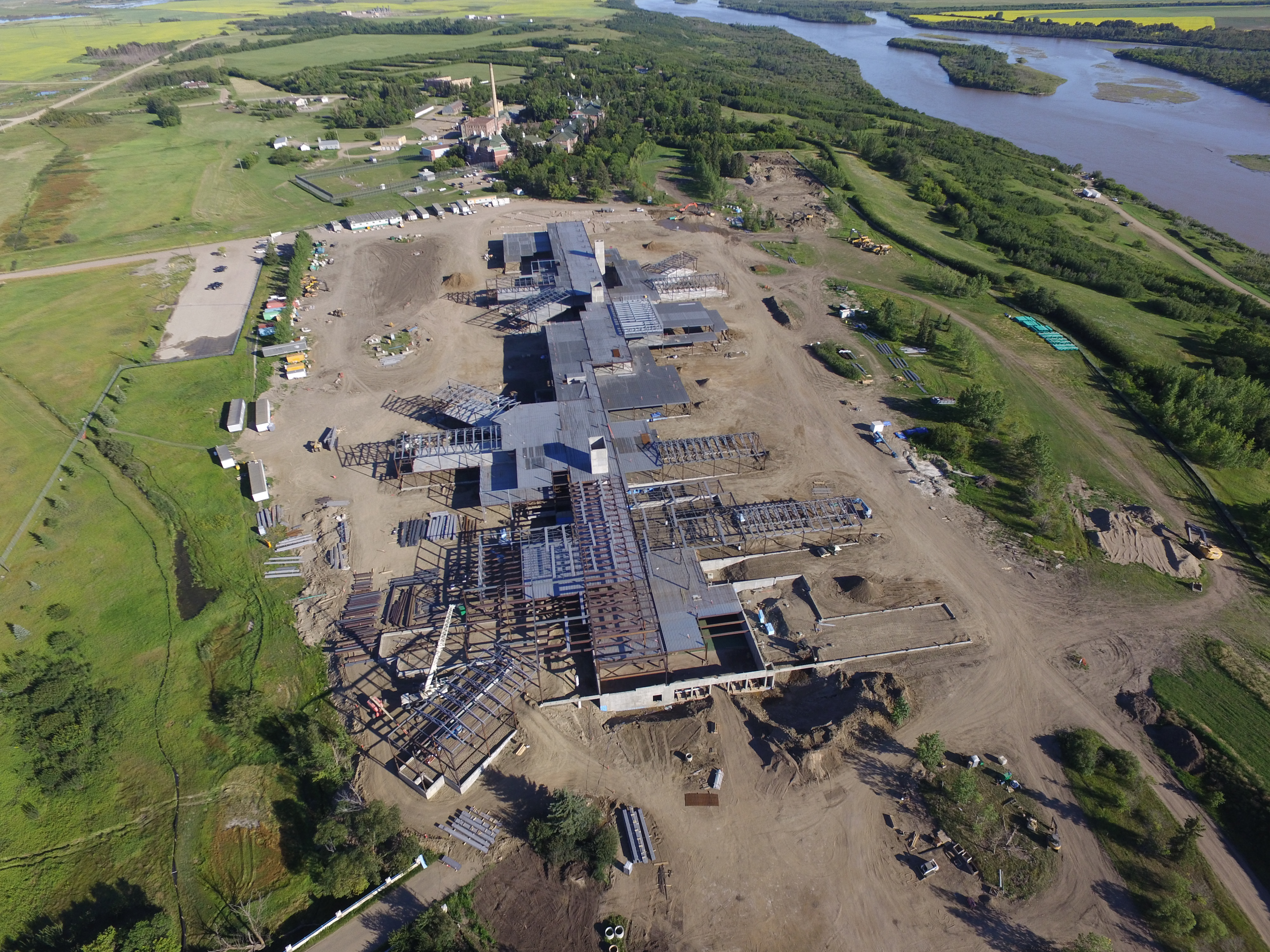
New SHNB under construction, July 2016

Built between 1911 and 1913, the facility in North Battleford was the first mental health hospital to be built in Saskatchewan, Canada. It had 156 beds. Prior to its establishment, patients were sent to hospitals in Manitoba. The first superintendent of the hospital was James Walter MacNeill. The number of patients peaked at over 4,000 in 1946; with the advent of community care throughout the province the number of patients in the facility had dropped to under 300 by 1980.

The original hospital was located at 1 Jersey Street in the North Battleford Crown Colony, a census subdivision adjacent to the City of North Battleford. The building was demolished in 2020, with the historic stone chapel, hand-built by a stonemason resident at the hospital; the Veterans’ Park; and three cemeteries preserved. The province used a drone service to take photos of the entire complex and grounds to keep as a record for the future, reflecting how the site once appeared. The Battlefords North West Historical Society had looked into the potential of having walking trails and interpretive signage that would document some of the history of the site.
