= Prairie North Health Region =

- Areas served: North Battleford, Lloydminster, Cut Knife, Edam, Goodsoil, Loon Lake, Maidstone, Meadow Lake, Neilburg, Paradise Hill, St. Walburg, Turtleford
- Website: pnrha.ca

The Prairie North Health Region was a health region in Saskatchewan, Canada. Primarily based in the central-northern region of the province, the health region operated out of four hospitals, and several community health centers and long term care facilities.

As of December 4, 2017, it is considered defunct, as all health regions in Saskatchewan have been replaced by the Saskatchewan Health Authority.

== Major hospitals ==
The major hospitals in the region include:

- Battlefords District Care Centre
- Battlefords Union Hospital
- Lloydminster Hospital
- Saskatchewan Hospital (Saskatchewan’s only provincial psychiatric rehabilitation hospital, located in the North Battleford Crown Colony adjacent to the City of North Battleford)

== Regional rural hospitals ==
The following regional hospitals and community health centers are located in the region:

- Cut Knife Health Complex (Cut Knife)
- Lady Minto Health Care Centre (Edam)
- L. Gervais Memorial Health Centre (Goodsoil)
- Loon Lake Hospital & Special Care Home (Loon Lake)
- Maidstone Health Complex (Maidstone)
- Meadow Lake Hospital (Meadow Lake)
- Manitou Health Centre (Neilburg)
- Paradise Hill Health Centre (Paradise Hill)
- St. Walburg Health Complex (St. Walburg)
- Riverside Health Complex (Turtleford)
