= National Museum of Antiquities =

National Museum of Antiquities may refer to:

- National Archaeological Museum, France, in Saint-Germain-en-Laye, France
- National Museum of Antiquities (Netherlands), in Leiden, Netherlands
- National Museum of Antiquities (Scotland), in Edinburgh, Scotland

== See also ==
- Museum of Antiquities (disambiguation)
