= Museum of Antiquities (Saskatoon) =

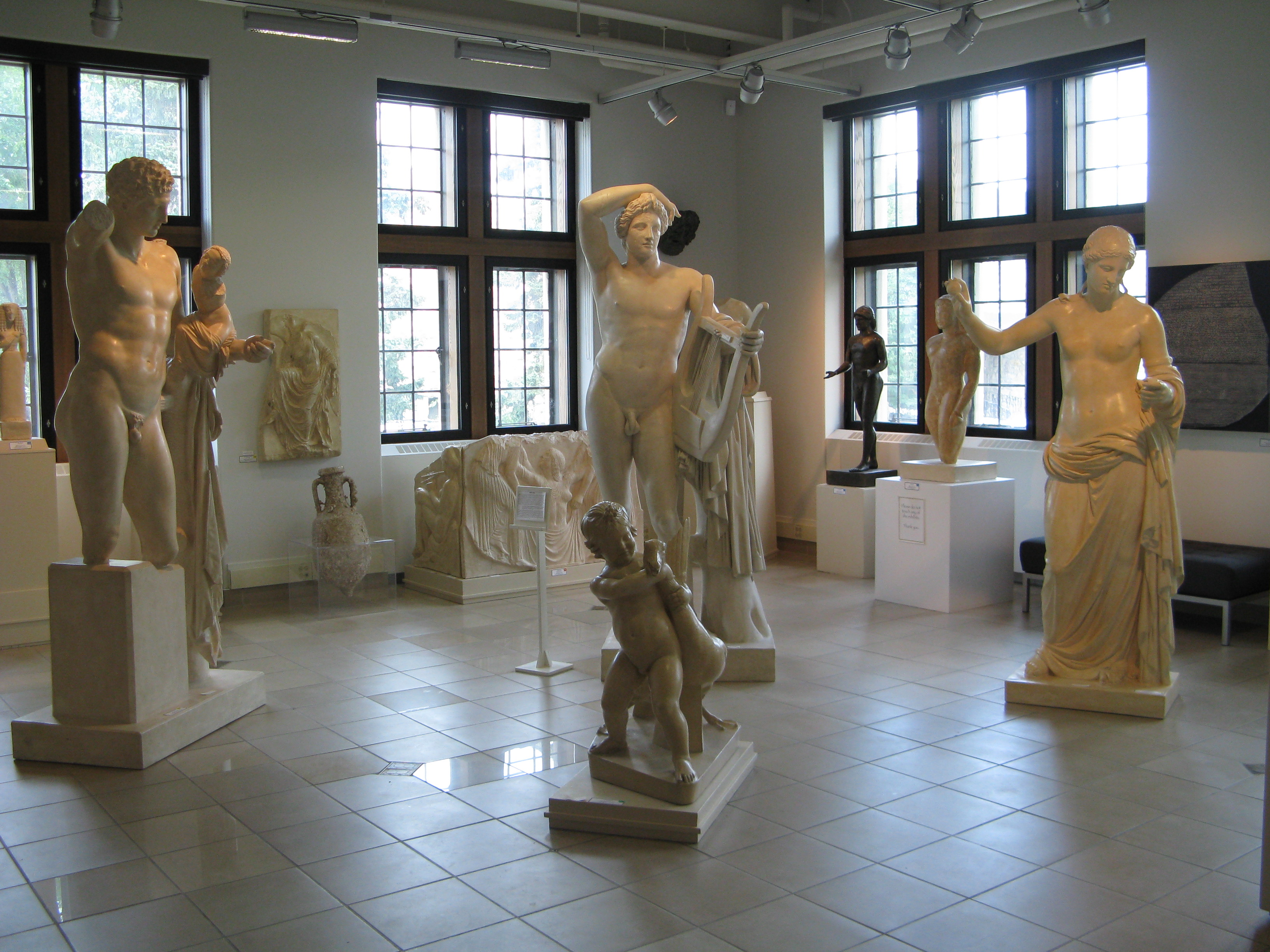
- Established: 1974
- Location: University of Saskatchewan, Saskatoon, Saskatchewan, Canada
- Coordinates: 52.13053°N 106.63253°W
- Type: Archaeology museum
- Director: Tracene Harvey
- Website: www.usask.ca/antiquities

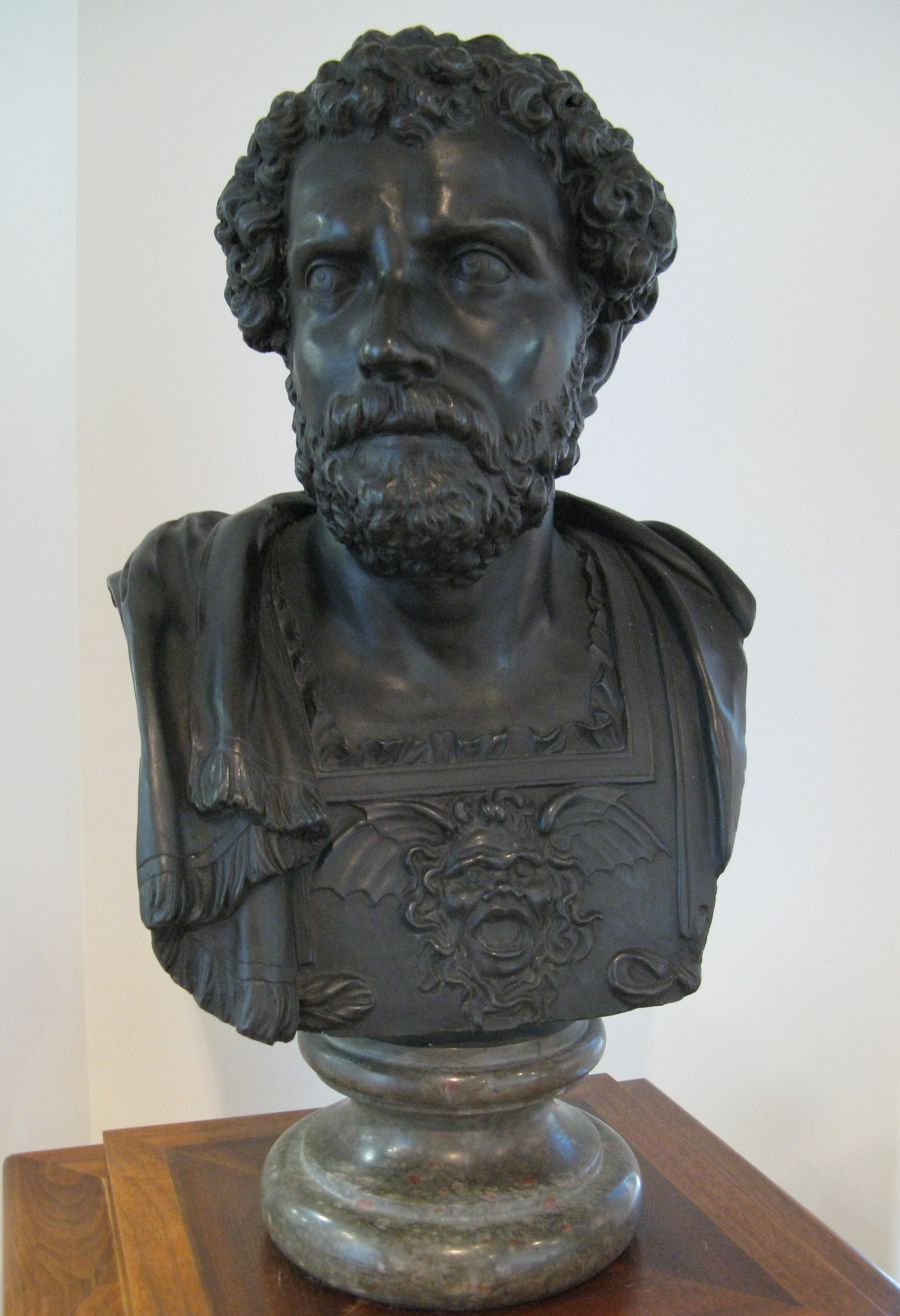
An original 17th-century portrait of Hannibal. Donated to the museum by Judge John C. Currelley in honour of his mother, Mary Newton Currelley.

The Museum of Antiquities is an archaeological museum at the University of Saskatchewan in Saskatoon, Canada. It opened in 1974 to provide an opportunity to study ancient works. The museum currently features a variety of Greek and Roman sculpture, and contains a collection of Near Eastern, Egyptian, Byzantine, Islamic and Medieval art. It is one of only a handful of museums of its kind in Canada.

== History ==
The project which became the “Museum of Antiquities” began in 1974. It was initiated by ancient history historian Michael Swan and art historian Nicholas Gyenes, both professors of the University of Saskatchewan. The collection began with a small group of replicas purchased from the Louvre, but grew to include replicas from other museums and workshops, as well as original artifacts. The collection grew through the generosity of the university and private benefactors until, in 1981, new facilities in the Murray Library were acquired, the collection was officially opened as the “Museum of Antiquities”, and Catherine Gunderson became the first curator and director of the museum. In 2005, the ever-expanding Museum moved to a larger space in the newly renovated College Building now known as the Peter MacKinnon Building. Tracene Harvey became director in 2009.

== Aims ==
The long-term aim of the museum is to offer a reliable and critical account of the artistic accomplishments of major Western civilizations and epochs from approximately 3000 BC to 1500 CE. The first step in this endeavor was the presentation of a dependable picture of ancient Greco-Roman sculptural art, as it has heavily influenced much later Western art. The present collection focuses on items from the Middle Helladic (c. 1500 BCE) to the Late Antique (c. 500 CE) period and now has expanded to include pieces from the ancient Near East and ancient Egypt.

== Pieces ==
The museum's pieces mainly consist of plaster cast replicas, making the collection one of a few cast collections in Canada, and the only one in Saskatchewan. The replicas in the museum are, in general, not crafted from the same material as the original. Most are casts of plaster or resin, not marble or bronze, for reasons of expense and weight. The replicas by large workshops—such as those at the Louvre, Paris, the British Museum, London, and the Gipsformerei der Staatlichen Museen, Berlin—are created from moulds taken directly from the original pieces. They therefore replicate exactly any damage borne by the original. After the plaster cast is unmoulded, it is painted and given a surface finish which matches the original. The collection has replicas of several famous pieces, such as the Rosetta Stone and the Venus de Milo.

The collection features original sculpture such as the 17th century portrait of Hannibal. Other original pieces include a storage amphora, a false door and a substantial collection of ancient glass.

== Feature exhibitions ==
The Hanson Collection: Early Islamic Artifacts (2013)

Masks as Mirrors: Reflections on Therapeutic Uses of Masks in Ancient Greek and Modern Times (2013)

Euphonia: Music for the Masses in the Middle Ages (2013)

The Minden Collection: Ancient Glass and Artifacts (2012)

Coinstantinople: An exploration of early coins that helped define the new Byzantine capital (2011)

Buildings of The Past: Scale Models of Ancient Buildings and Monuments (2011)

Optimi Principes: New acquisitions of Roman Imperial Art Unveiled (2010)

Sex? in the City: Images of Sexuality in Roman Domestic Space (2009)

Bene Merenti: Inscriptions from the Roman Catacombs (2008)

Wondrous Print: Renaissance Books in Saskatchewan Collections (2007)

Oasis: Civilizations of the Desert (2007)

Art of Adornment (2006)

The Stonecarver's Craft (2005)

Greece Then & Now (2003)

== Activities ==
The museum also runs "Living History" Children's Summer Camps. As part of its community outreach initiatives the museum takes part in many cultural festivals such as the Heritage Festival of Saskatoon, Folkfest and Culture Days.

The museum has a volunteer program for university students that allows them to learn about researching for and running a museum.

The museum has partnered with the Canadian Light Source to research ancient coins.
