= Saskatchewan =

Province of Canada

- Province
- Flag Coat of arms
- Motto(s): Multis e Gentibus Vires (Latin) "From Many Peoples, Strength"
- Coordinates: 54°N 106°W
- Country: Canada
- Before confederation: Districts of Assiniboia, Athabasca, Saskatchewan
- Confederation: September 1, 1905 (split from NWT) (10th, with Alberta)
- Capital: Regina
- Largest city: Saskatoon
- Largest metro: Greater Saskatoon

Government
  - Type: Parliamentary constitutional monarchy
  - Lieutenant Governor: Bernadette McIntyre
  - Premier: Scott Moe
- Legislature: Legislature of Saskatchewan
- Federal representation: Parliament of Canada
- House seats: 14 of 343 (4.1%)
- Senate seats: 6 of 105 (5.7%)

Area
  - Total: 651,900 km^{2} (251,700 sq mi)
  - Land: 591,670 km^{2} (228,450 sq mi)
  - Water: 59,366 km^{2} (22,921 sq mi) 9.1%
  - Rank: 7th
- 6.5% of Canada

Population (2021)
  - Total: 1,132,505
  - Estimate (Q3 2026): 1,278,402
  - Rank: 6th
  - Density: 1.91/km^{2} (4.9/sq mi)
- Demonym: Saskatchewanian (official)
- Official languages: English

GDP
  - Rank: 5th
  - Total (2015): CA$79.415 billion
  - Per capita: CA$70,138 (4th)

HDI
  - HDI (2023): 0.932—Very high (6th)

Time zones
- Most areas: UTC−06:00 (CST)
- Creighton, Denare Beach and nearby areas: UTC−05:00 (CDT)
- Canadian postal abbr.: SK
- Postal code prefix: S
- ISO 3166 code: CA-SK
- Flower: Western red lily
- Tree: Paper birch
- Bird: Sharp-tailed grouse
- Website: saskatchewan.ca
- Rankings include all provinces and territories

Saskatchewan (Note: /səˈskætʃ(ə)wən/ sə-SKATCH-(ə-)wən; Canadian French: [saskatʃəwan]) is a province in Western Canada. It is bordered to the west by Alberta, to the north by the Northwest Territories, to the east by Manitoba, to the northeast by Nunavut, and to the south by the United States (Montana and North Dakota). Saskatchewan and neighbouring Alberta are the only landlocked provinces in Canada. In 2026, Saskatchewan's population was estimated at 1,278,402. Nearly 10% of Saskatchewan's total area of 651,900 square kilometres (251,700 sq mi) is fresh water, mostly rivers, reservoirs, and lakes.

Saskatchewanians live primarily in the southern prairie half of the province, while the northern half is mostly forested and sparsely populated. Roughly half live in Saskatchewan's two largest cities; Regina (the province's capital city) and Saskatoon (the province's largest city). Other notable cities in Saskatchewan include Prince Albert, Moose Jaw, Yorkton, Swift Current, North Battleford, Estevan, Weyburn, Melfort, and the border city of Lloydminster. English is the primary language of the province, with 82.4% of Saskatchewanians speaking English as their first language.

Saskatchewan has been inhabited for thousands of years by Indigenous peoples. Europeans first explored any part of the province in 1690 and first settled in the area in 1774. It became a province on September 1, 1905, carved out from the vast North-West Territories, which had until then included most of the Canadian Prairies. In the early 20th century, the province became known as a stronghold for Canadian social democracy, with the 1944 provincial election electing North America's first socialist government to office.

Saskatchewan's economy is based on agriculture, mining, and energy. In 1992, the federal and provincial governments signed a historic land claim agreement with First Nations in Saskatchewan, granting these nations compensation which they could use to buy land on the open market for the bands. Presently, Saskatchewan is governed by the Saskatchewan Party, led by Premier Scott Moe, which has been in power since 2007.

== Etymology ==
The name of the province, "Saskatchewan", is derived from the Saskatchewan River. The river is known as ᑭᓯᐢᑳᒋᐘᓂ ᓰᐱᐩ kisiskāciwani-sīpiy ("swift flowing river") in the Cree language. Anthony Henday's spelling was Keiskatchewan, with the modern rendering, Saskatchewan, being officially adopted in 1882, when a portion of the present-day province was designated a provisional district of the North-West Territories.

== Geography ==
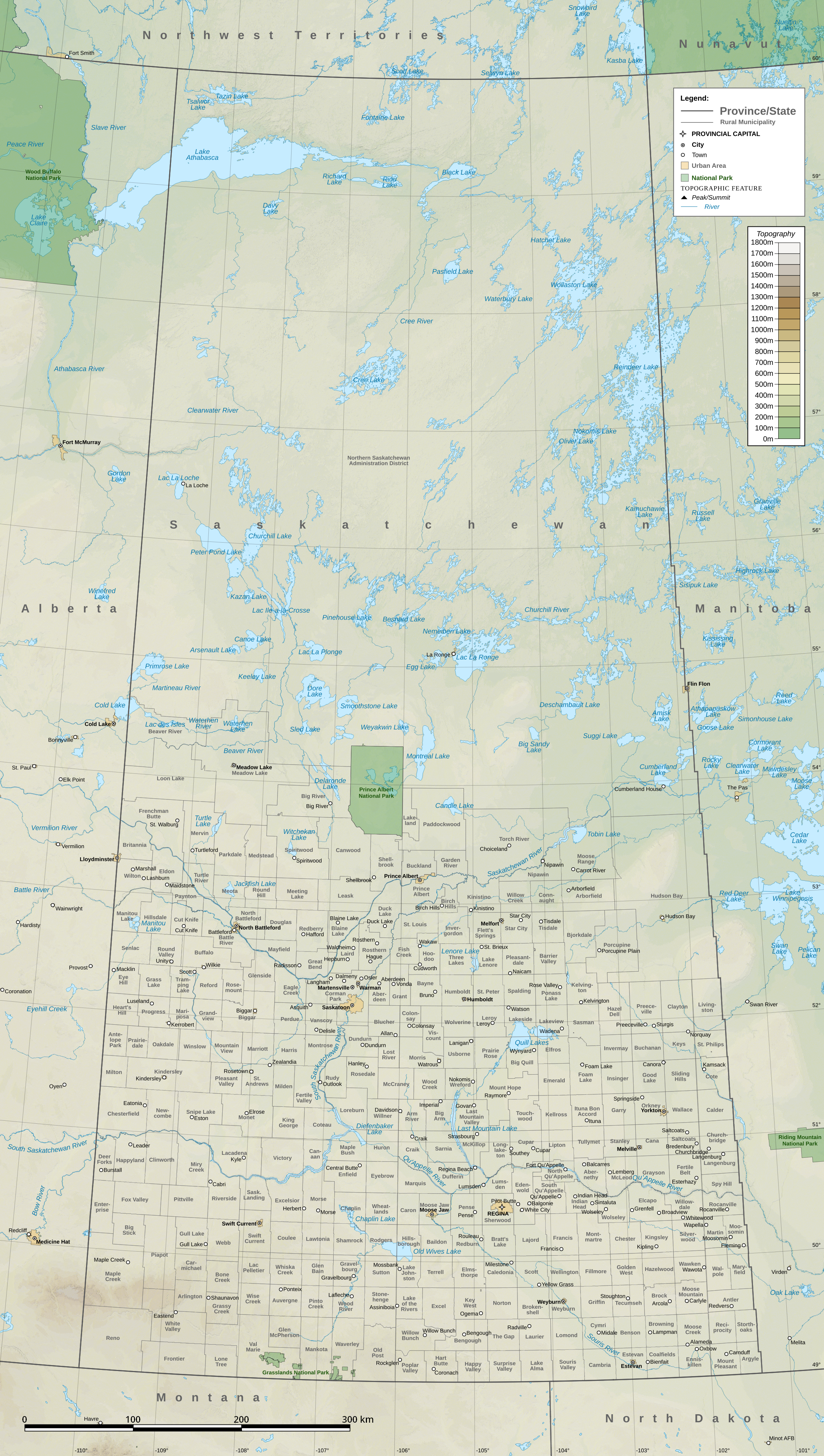
A topographic map of Saskatchewan, showing cities, towns, rural municipality borders, and natural features.

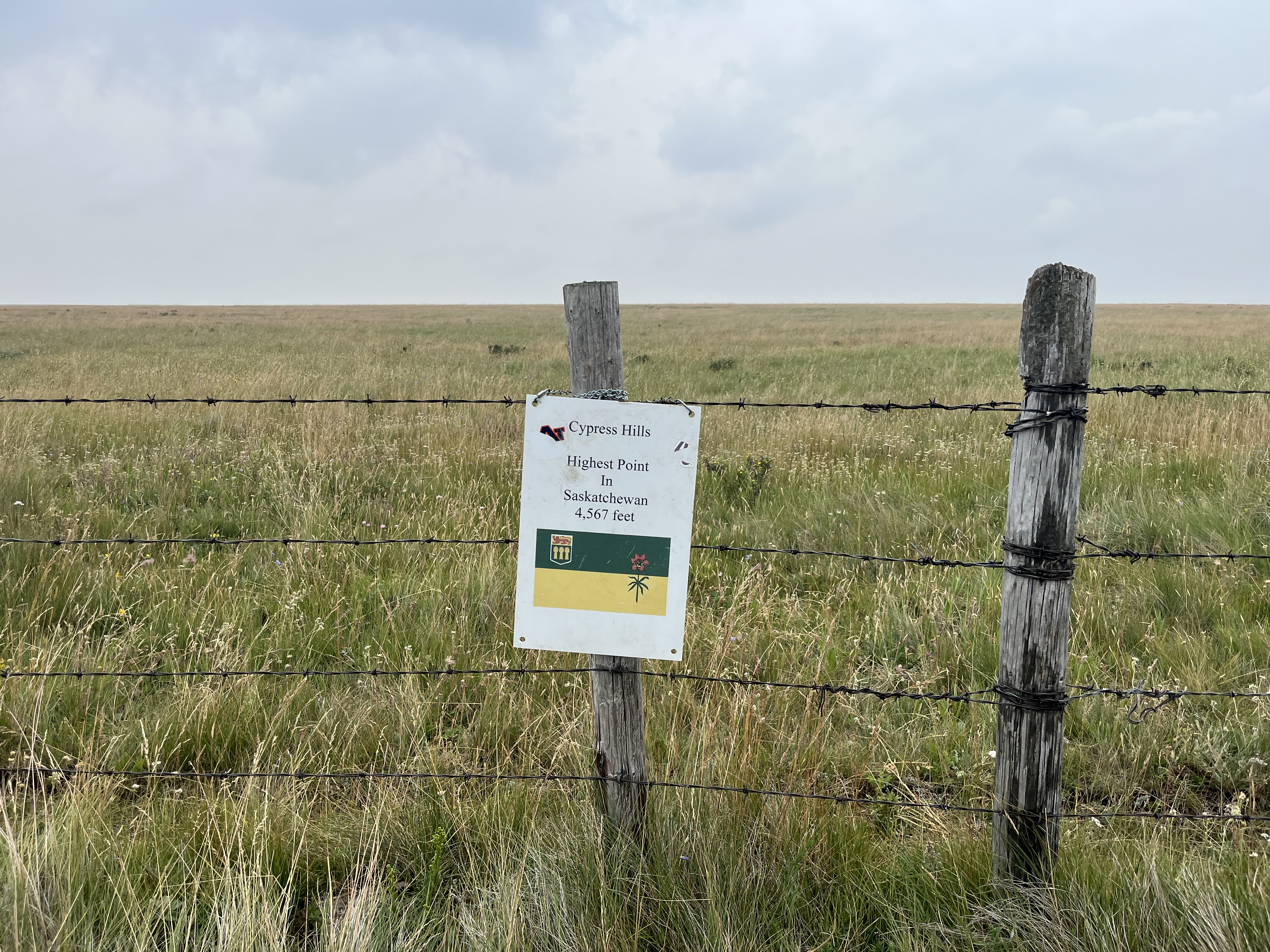
The highest point in Saskatchewan, at 1,392 metres (4,567 ft), is found near the Cypress Hills.

Saskatchewan is the only province without a natural border. As its borders follow geographic lines of longitude and latitude, the province is roughly a quadrilateral, or a shape with four sides. However, the southern border on the 49th parallel and the northern border on the 60th parallel curve to the left as one proceeds east, as do all parallels in the Northern Hemisphere. The western boundary is set at the 110th meridian; the eastern boundary of the province follows range lines and correction lines of the Dominion Land Survey, laid out by surveyors before the Dominion Lands Act homestead program (1880–1928).

Saskatchewan is bounded on the west by Alberta, on the north by the Northwest Territories, on the north-east by Nunavut, on the east by Manitoba, and on the south by the U.S. states of Montana and North Dakota. Along with Alberta, Saskatchewan is one of only two land-locked provinces.

The overwhelming majority of Saskatchewan's population is in the southern third of the province, south of the 53rd parallel.

Saskatchewan contains two major natural regions: the boreal forest in the north and the prairies in the south. They are separated by an aspen parkland transition zone near the North Saskatchewan River on the western side of the province, and near to south of the Saskatchewan River on the eastern side. Northern Saskatchewan is mostly covered by forest except for the Lake Athabasca Sand Dunes, the largest active sand dunes in the world north of 58°, and adjacent to the southern shore of Lake Athabasca. Southern Saskatchewan contains another area with sand dunes known as the "Great Sand Hills", covering over 300 square kilometres (120 sq mi). The Cypress Hills, in the southwestern corner of Saskatchewan and Killdeer Badlands (Grasslands National Park), are areas of the province that were unglaciated during the last glaciation period, the Wisconsin glaciation.

The province's highest point, at 1,392 metres (4,567 ft), is in the Cypress Hills less than two kilometres (1.2 mi) from the provincial boundary with Alberta. The lowest point is the shore of Lake Athabasca, at 213 metres (699 ft). The province has 14 major drainage basins made up of various rivers and watersheds draining into the Arctic Ocean, Hudson Bay, and the Gulf of Mexico.

=== Climate ===
Köppen climate types of Saskatchewan

Saskatchewan receives more hours of sunshine than any other Canadian province. The province lies far from any significant body of water. This fact, combined with its northerly latitude, gives it a warm summer, corresponding to its humid continental climate (Köppen type Dfb) in the central and most of the eastern parts of the province, as well as the Cypress Hills; drying off to a semi-arid steppe climate (Köppen type BSk) in the southwestern part of the province. Drought can affect agricultural areas during long periods with little or no precipitation at all. The northern parts of Saskatchewan – from about La Ronge northward – have a subarctic climate (Köppen Dfc) with a shorter summer season. Summers can get very hot, sometimes above 38 °C (100 °F) during the day, and with humidity decreasing from northeast to southwest. Warm southern winds blow from the plains and intermontane regions of the Western United States during much of July and August, and very cool or hot but changeable air masses often occur during spring and in September. Winters are usually bitterly cold, with frequent Arctic air descending from the north, and with high temperatures not breaking −17 °C (1 °F) for weeks at a time. Warm chinook winds often blow from the west, bringing periods of mild weather. Annual precipitation averages 30 to 45 centimetres (12 to 18 inches) across the province, with the bulk of rain falling in June, July, and August.

Saskatchewan is one of the most tornado-active parts of Canada, averaging roughly 12 to 18 tornadoes per year, some violent. In 2012, 33 tornadoes were reported in the province. The Regina Cyclone took place in June 1912 when 28 people died in an F4 Fujita scale tornado. Severe and non-severe thunderstorm events occur in Saskatchewan, usually from early spring to late summer. Hail, strong winds and isolated tornadoes are a common occurrence.

The hottest temperature ever recorded in Saskatchewan was in July 1937 when the temperature rose to 45 °C (113 °F) in Midale and Yellow Grass. The coldest ever recorded in the province was −56.7 °C (−70.1 °F) in Prince Albert, north of Saskatoon, in February 1893.

Average daily maximum and minimum temperatures for selected cities in Saskatchewan
City	Average maximum in July	Average minimum in July	Average maximum in January	Average minimum in January
Maple Creek	27 °C (81 °F)	11 °C (52 °F)	−5 °C (23 °F)	−16 °C (3 °F)
Estevan	27 °C (81 °F)	13 °C (55 °F)	−9 °C (16 °F)	−20 °C (−4 °F)
Weyburn	26 °C (79 °F)	12 °C (54 °F)	−10 °C (14 °F)	−21 °C (−6 °F)
Moose Jaw	26 °C (79 °F)	12 °C (54 °F)	−8 °C (18 °F)	−19 °C (−2 °F)
Regina	26 °C (79 °F)	11 °C (52 °F)	−10 °C (14 °F)	−22 °C (−8 °F)
Saskatoon	25 °C (77 °F)	11 °C (52 °F)	−12 °C (10 °F)	−22 °C (−8 °F)
Melville	25 °C (77 °F)	11 °C (52 °F)	−12 °C (10 °F)	−22 °C (−8 °F)
Swift Current	25 °C (77 °F)	11 °C (52 °F)	−7 °C (19 °F)	−17 °C (1 °F)
Humboldt	24 °C (75 °F)	11 °C (52 °F)	−12 °C (10 °F)	−23 °C (−9 °F)
Melfort	24 °C (75 °F)	11 °C (52 °F)	−14 °C (7 °F)	−23 °C (−9 °F)
North Battleford	24 °C (75 °F)	11 °C (52 °F)	−12 °C (10 °F)	−22 °C (−8 °F)
Yorkton	24 °C (75 °F)	11 °C (52 °F)	−13 °C (9 °F)	−23 °C (−9 °F)
Lloydminster	23 °C (73 °F)	11 °C (52 °F)	−10 °C (14 °F)	−19 °C (−2 °F)
Prince Albert	24 °C (75 °F)	11 °C (52 °F)	−13 °C (9 °F)	−25 °C (−13 °F)
Uranium City	21 °C (70 °F)	11 °C (52 °F)	−22 °C (−8 °F)	−32 °C (−26 °F)

==== Climate change ====
The effects of climate change in Saskatchewan are now being observed in parts of the province. Evidence of reduction of biomass in Saskatchewan's boreal forests (as with those of other Canadian prairie provinces) is linked by researchers to drought-related water stress, stemming from global warming, most likely caused by greenhouse gas emissions. While studies as early as 1988 (Williams, et al., 1988) have shown climate change will affect agriculture, whether the effects can be mitigated through adaptations of cultivars, or crops, is less clear. Resiliency of ecosystems may decline with large changes in temperature. The provincial government has responded to the threat of climate change by introducing a plan to reduce carbon emissions, "The Saskatchewan Energy and Climate Change Plan", in June 2007.

== History ==
Henry Kelsey and four Indigenous men observing a bison herd on the Canadian Prairies in 1691

Saskatchewan has been populated by various indigenous peoples of North America, including members of the Sarcee, Niitsitapi, Atsina, Cree, Saulteaux, Assiniboine (Nakoda), and Sioux.

The first known European to enter Saskatchewan was Henry Kelsey from England in 1690, who travelled up the Saskatchewan River in hopes of trading fur with the region's indigenous peoples. Fort La Jonquière and Fort de la Corne were first established in 1751 and 1753 by early French explorers and traders. The first permanent European settlement was a Hudson's Bay Company post at Cumberland House, founded in 1774 by Samuel Hearne. The southern part of the province was part of Spanish Louisiana from 1762 until 1802.

=== 19th century ===
In 1803, the Louisiana Purchase transferred from France to the United States part of what is now Alberta and Saskatchewan. In 1818, the U.S. ceded the area to Britain. Most of what is now Saskatchewan was part of Rupert's Land and controlled by the Hudson's Bay Company, which claimed rights to all watersheds flowing into Hudson Bay, including the Saskatchewan River, Churchill, Assiniboine, Souris, and Qu'Appelle River systems.

In the late 1850s and early 1860s, scientific expeditions led by John Palliser and Henry Youle Hind explored the prairie region of the province.

In 1870, Canada acquired the Hudson's Bay Company's territories and formed the North-West Territories to administer the vast territory between British Columbia and Manitoba. The Crown also entered into a series of numbered treaties with the indigenous peoples of the area, which serve as the basis of the relationship between First Nations, as they are called today, and the Crown. Since the late twentieth century, land losses and inequities as a result of those treaties have been subject to negotiation for settlement between the First Nations in Saskatchewan and the federal government, in collaboration with provincial governments.

In 1876, following their defeat of United States Army forces at the Battle of the Little Bighorn in Montana Territory in the United States, the Lakota Chief Sitting Bull led several thousand of his people to Wood Mountain. Survivors and descendants founded Wood Mountain Reserve in 1914.

The North-West Mounted Police set up several posts and forts across Saskatchewan, including Fort Walsh in the Cypress Hills, and Wood Mountain Post in south-central Saskatchewan near the United States border.

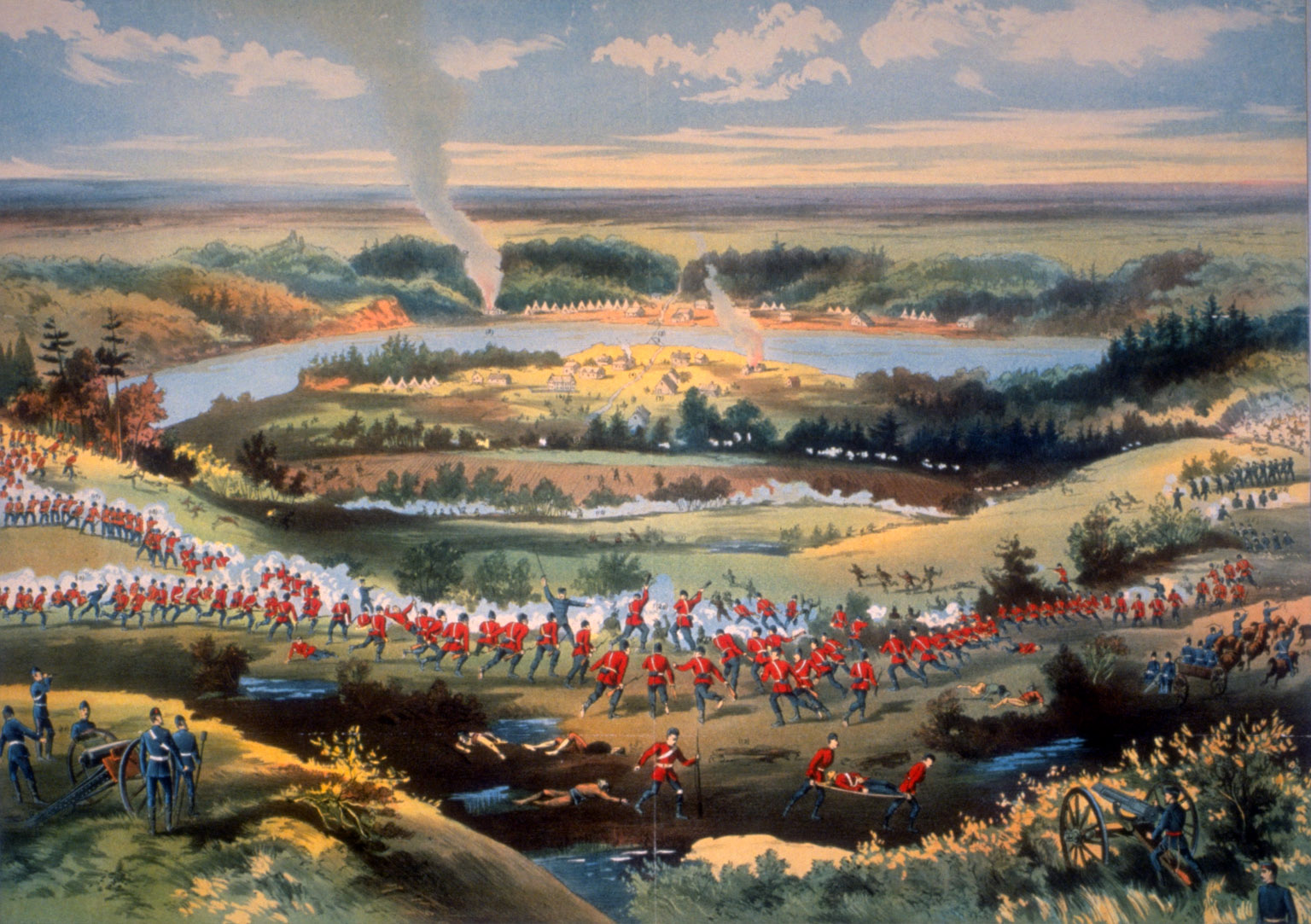
The 1885 Battle of Batoche was a battle during the North-West Rebellion. 1885 illustration by Sergeant Grundy

Many Métis people, who had not been signatories to a treaty, had moved to the Southbranch Settlement and Prince Albert district north of present-day Saskatoon following the Red River Rebellion in Manitoba in 1870. In the early 1880s, the Canadian government refused to hear the Métis' grievances, which stemmed from land-use issues. Finally, in 1885, the Métis, led by Louis Riel, staged the North-West Rebellion and declared a provisional government. They were defeated by a Canadian militia brought to the Canadian prairies by the new Canadian Pacific Railway. Riel, who surrendered and was convicted of treason in a packed Regina courtroom, was hanged on November 16, 1885. Since then, the government has recognized the Métis as an aboriginal people with status rights and provided them with various benefits.

==== European settlements ====
The national policy set by the federal government, the Canadian Pacific Railway, the Hudson's Bay Company and associated land companies encouraged immigration. The Dominion Lands Act of 1872 permitted settlers to acquire one-quarter of a square mile of land to homestead and offered an additional quarter upon establishing a homestead. In 1874, the North-West Mounted Police began providing police services. In 1876, the North-West Territories Act provided for appointment, by Ottawa, of a Lieutenant Governor and a Council to assist him.

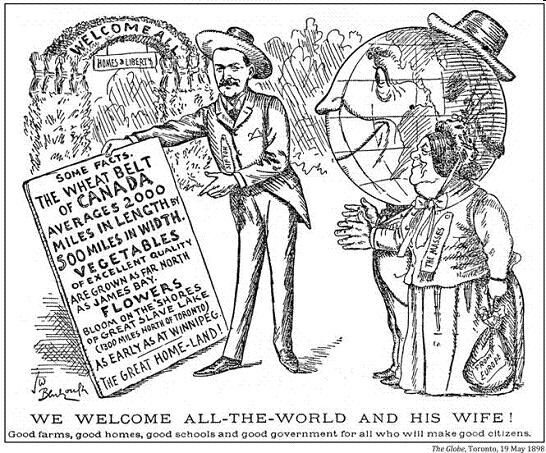
An ad to attract immigrants to Western Canada, 1898

Highly optimistic advertising campaigns promoted the benefits of prairie living. Potential immigrants read leaflets that described Canada as a favourable place to live and downplayed the need for agricultural expertise. Ads in The Nor'-West Farmer by the Commissioner of Immigration implied that western land held water, wood, gold, silver, iron, copper, and cheap coal for fuel, all of which were readily at hand. The reality was far harsher, especially for the first arrivals who lived in sod houses. However eastern money poured in and by 1913, long term mortgage loans to Saskatchewan farmers had reached $65 million.

The dominant groups comprised British settlers from eastern Canada and Britain, who comprised about half of the population during the late 19th and early 20th centuries. They played the leading role in establishing the basic institutions of plains society, economy and government.

=== 20th century ===
Gender roles were sharply defined. Men were primarily responsible for breaking the land; planting and harvesting; building the house; buying, operating and repairing machinery; and handling finances. At first, there were many single men on the prairie, or husbands whose wives were still back east, but they had a hard time. They realized the need for a wife. In 1901, there were 19,200 families, but this surged to 150,300 families only 15 years later. Wives played a central role in settlement of the prairie region. Their labour, skills, and ability to adapt to the harsh environment proved decisive in meeting the challenges. They prepared bannock, beans and bacon, mended clothes, raised children, cleaned, tended the garden, helped at harvest time and nursed everyone back to health. While prevailing patriarchal attitudes, legislation, and economic principles obscured women's contributions, the flexibility exhibited by farm women in performing productive and nonproductive labour was critical to the survival of family farms, and thus to the success of the wheat economy.

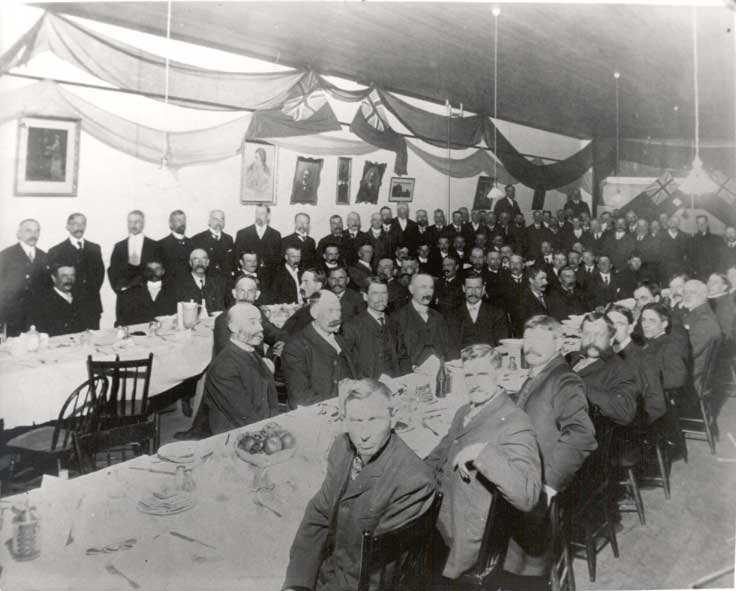
A banquet being held to commemorate the creation of Saskatchewan, 1905

On September 1, 1905, Saskatchewan became a province, with inauguration day held on September 4. Its political leaders at the time proclaimed its destiny was to become Canada's most powerful province. Saskatchewan embarked on an ambitious province-building program based on its Anglo-Canadian culture and wheat production for the export market. Population quintupled from 91,000 in 1901 to 492,000 in 1911, thanks to heavy immigration of farmers from Ukraine, U.S., Germany and Scandinavia. Efforts were made to assimilate the newcomers to British Canadian culture and values.

In the 1905 provincial elections, Liberals won 16 of 25 seats in Saskatchewan. The Saskatchewan government bought out Bell Telephone Company in 1909, with the government owning the long-distance lines and left local service to small companies organized at the municipal level. Premier Walter Scott preferred government assistance to outright ownership because he thought enterprises worked better if citizens had a stake in running them; he set up the Saskatchewan Cooperative Elevator Company in 1911. Despite pressure from farm groups for direct government involvement in the grain handling business, the Scott government opted to loan money to a farmer-owned elevator company. Saskatchewan in 1909 provided bond guarantees to railway companies for the construction of branch lines, alleviating the concerns of farmers who had trouble getting their wheat to market by waggon. The Saskatchewan Grain Growers Association, was the dominant political force in the province until the 1920s; it had close ties with the governing Liberal party. In 1913, the Saskatchewan Stock Growers Association was established with three goals: to watch over legislation; to forward the interests of the stock growers in every honourable and legitimate way; and to suggest to parliament legislation to meet changing conditions and requirements.

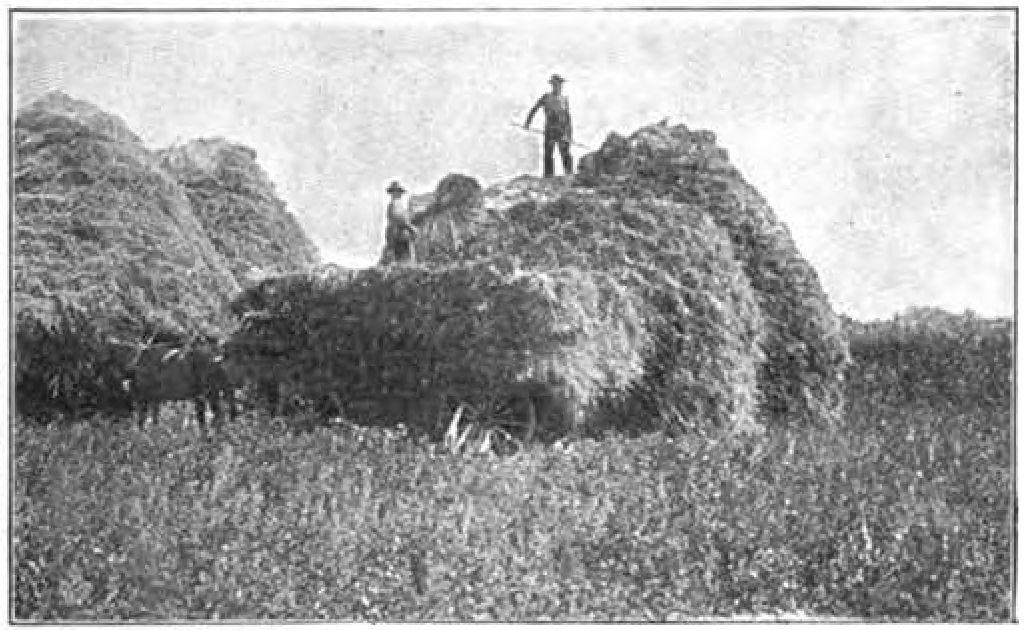
Farmers at work in 1907. The introduction of Marquis wheat saw wheat output soar in the province.

Immigration peaked in 1910, and in spite of the initial difficulties of frontier life – distance from towns, sod homes, and backbreaking labour – new settlers established a European-Canadian style of prosperous agrarian society. The long-term prosperity of the province depended on the world price of grain, which headed steadily upward from the 1880s to 1920, then plunged down. Wheat output was increased by new strains, such as the "Marquis wheat" strain which matured 8 days sooner and yielded 7 more bushels per acre (0.72 m^{3}/ha) than the previous standard, "Red Fife". The national output of wheat soared from 8 million imperial bushels (290,000 m^{3}) in 1896, to 26×10^{6} imp bu (950,000 m^{3}) in 1901, reaching 151×10^{6} imp bu (5,500,000 m^{3}) by 1921.

Urban reform movements in Regina were based on support from business and professional groups. City planning, reform of local government, and municipal ownership of utilities were more widely supported by these two groups, often through such organizations as the Board of Trade. Church-related and other altruistic organizations generally supported social welfare and housing reforms; these groups were generally less successful in getting their own reforms enacted.

The province responded to the First World War in 1914 with patriotic enthusiasm and enjoyed the resultant economic boom for farms and cities alike. Emotional and intellectual support for the war emerged from the politics of Canadian national identity, the rural myth, and social gospel progressivism The Church of England was especially supportive. However, there was strong hostility toward German-Canadian farmers. Recent Ukrainian immigrants were enemy aliens because of their citizenship in the Austro-Hungarian Empire. A small fraction were taken to internment camps. Most of the internees were unskilled unemployed labourers who were imprisoned "because they were destitute, not because they were disloyal".

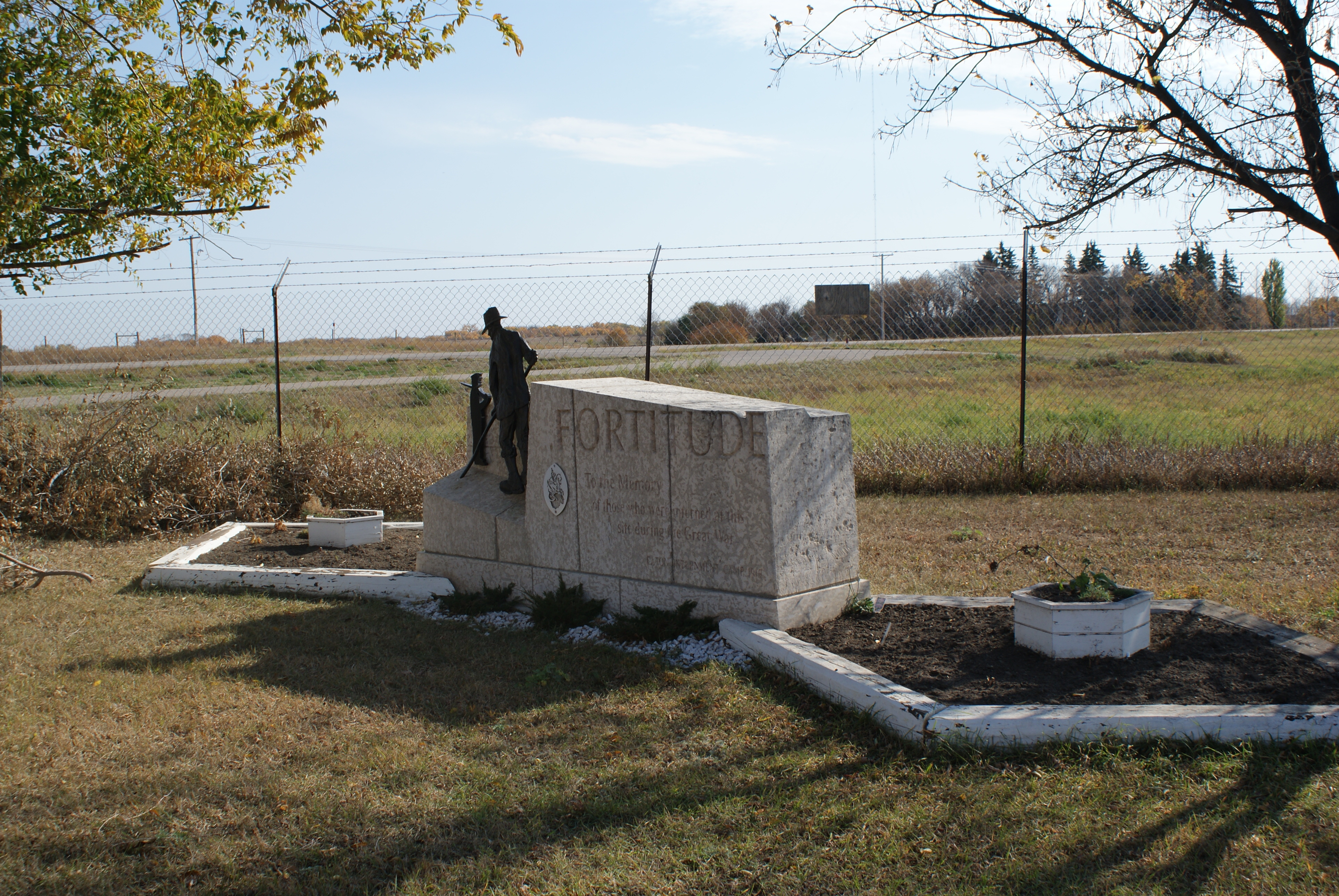
A memorial stone for Ukrainian Canadians interned during the First World War at the Saskatchewan Railway Museum

The price of wheat tripled and acreage seeded doubled. The wartime spirit of sacrifice intensified social reform movements that had predated the war and now came to fruition. Saskatchewan gave women the right to vote in 1916 and at the end of 1916 passed a referendum to prohibit the sale of alcohol.

In the late 1920s, the Ku Klux Klan, imported from the United States and Ontario, gained brief popularity in nativist circles in Saskatchewan and Alberta. The Klan, briefly allied with the provincial Conservative party because of their mutual dislike for Premier James G. "Jimmy" Gardiner and his Liberals (who ferociously fought the Klan), enjoyed about two years of prominence. It declined and disappeared, subject to widespread political and media opposition, plus internal scandals involving the use of the organization's funds.

==== Post–Second World War ====
In 1970, the first annual Canadian Western Agribition was held in Regina. This farm-industry trade show, with its strong emphasis on livestock, is rated as one of the five top livestock shows in North America, along with those in Houston, Denver, Louisville and Toronto.

An equestrian statue of Elizabeth II in Regina. The statue was unveiled by the Queen in 2005.

The province celebrated the 75th anniversary of its establishment in 1980, with Princess Margaret, Countess of Snowdon, presiding over the official ceremonies. In 2005, 25 years later, her sister, Queen Elizabeth II, attended the events held to mark Saskatchewan's centennial.

Since the late 20th century, First Nations have become more politically active in seeking justice for past inequities, especially related to the taking of indigenous lands by various governments. The federal and provincial governments have negotiated on numerous land claims, and developed a program of "Treaty Land Entitlement", enabling First Nations to buy land to be taken into reserves with money from settlements of claims.

"In 1992, the federal and provincial governments signed an historic land claim agreement with Saskatchewan First Nations. Under the Agreement, the First Nations received money to buy land on the open market. As a result, about 761,000 acres have been turned into reserve land and many First Nations continue to invest their settlement dollars in urban areas", including Saskatoon. The money from such settlements has enabled First Nations to invest in businesses and other economic infrastructure.

=== 21st century ===
In June 2021, a graveyard containing the remains of 751 unidentified people was found at the former Marieval Indian Residential School, part of the Canadian Indian residential school system. In 2022, a stabbing spree occurred, one of the deadliest massacres in Canadian history.

== Demographics ==
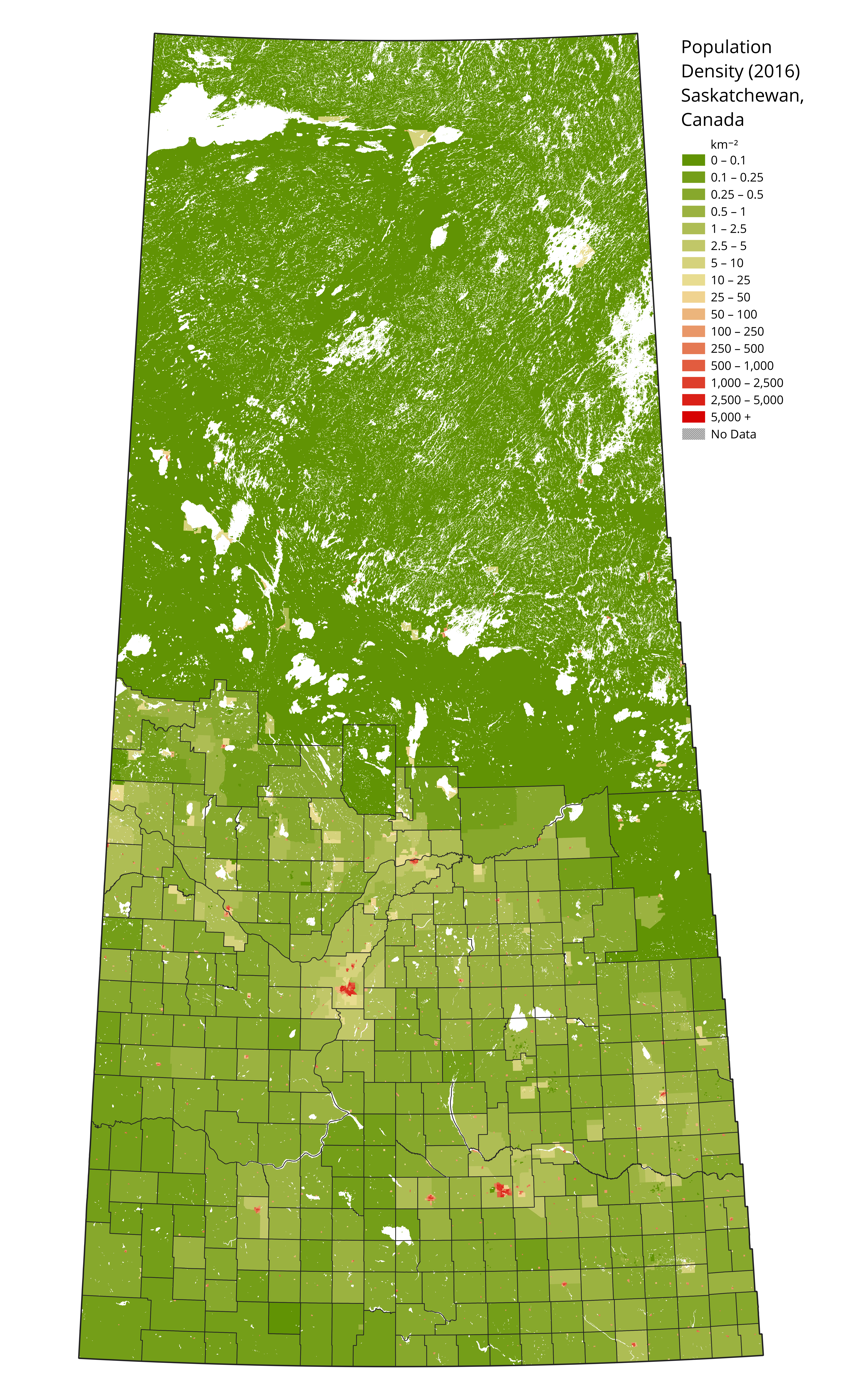
Population density of Saskatchewan

=== Ethnicity ===
According to the 2011 Canadian census, the largest ethnic group in Saskatchewan is German (28.6%), followed by English (24.9%), Scottish (18.9%), Canadian (18.8%), Irish (15.5%), Ukrainian (13.5%), French (Fransaskois) (12.2%), First Nations (12.1%), Norwegian (6.9%), and Polish (5.8%).

=== Language ===
As of the 2021 Canadian census, the ten most spoken languages in the province included English (1,094,785 or 99.24%), French (52,065 or 4.72%), Tagalog (36,125 or 3.27%), Cree (24,850 or 2.25%), Hindi (15,745 or 1.43%), Punjabi (13,310 or 1.21%), German (11,815 or 1.07%), Mandarin (11,590 or 1.05%), Spanish (11,185 or 1.01%), and Ukrainian (10,795 or 0.98%). The question on knowledge of languages allows for multiple responses.

=== Religion ===
According to the 2021 census, religious groups in Saskatchewan included:

- Christianity (621,250 persons or 56.3%)
  - Catholics at 265,530 persons, Lutherans at 46,980 persons, and Anglicans at 36,415 persons.
- Irreligion (403,960 persons or 36.6%)
- Islam (25,455 persons or 2.3%)
- Indigenous Spirituality (16,300 persons or 1.5%)
- Hinduism (14,150 persons or 1.3%)
- Sikhism (9,040 persons or 0.8%)
- Buddhism (4,410 persons or 0.4%)
- Judaism (1,105 persons or 0.1%)
- Other (7,540 persons or 0.7%)

== Economy ==
Historically, Saskatchewan's economy was primarily associated with agriculture, with wheat being the precious symbol on the province's flag. Increasing diversification has resulted in agriculture, forestry, fishing, and hunting only making up 8.9% of the province's GDP in 2018. Saskatchewan grows a large portion of Canada's grain. In 2017, the production of canola surpassed the production of wheat, which is Saskatchewan's most familiar crop and the one most often associated with the province. The total net income from farming was $3.3 billion in 2017, which was $0.9 billion less than the income in 2016. Other grains such as flax, rye, oats, peas, lentils, canary seed, and barley are also produced in the province. Saskatchewan is the world's largest exporter of mustard seed. Beef cattle production by a Canadian province is only exceeded by Alberta. In the northern part of the province, forestry is also a significant industry.

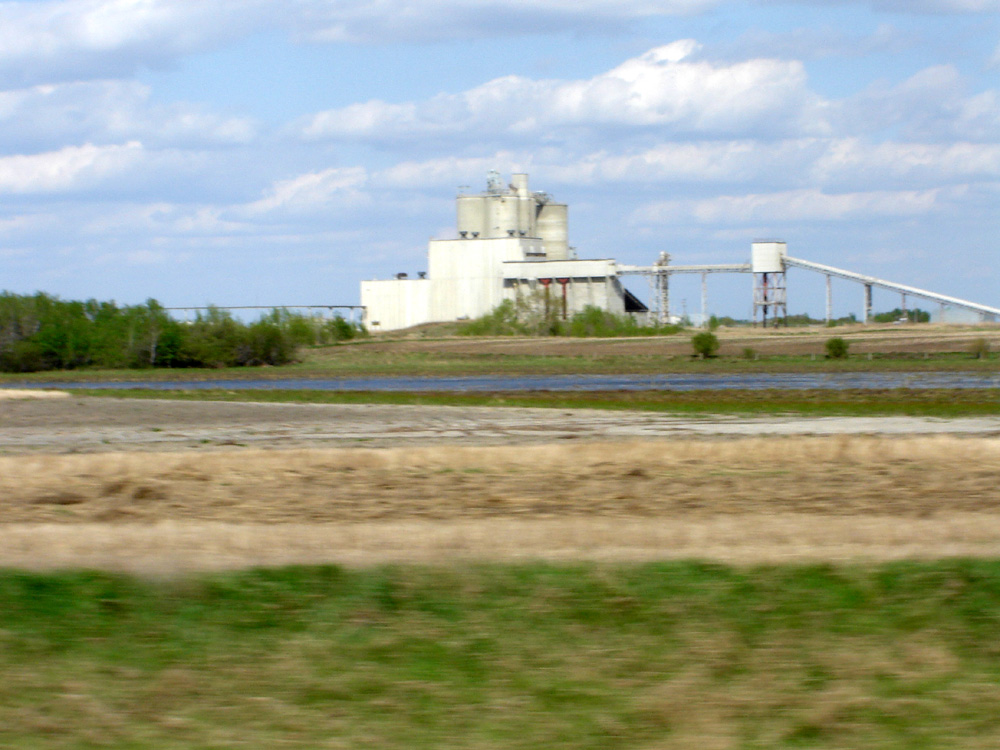
A Nutrien mine in Patience Lake. The province is the world's largest exporter of potash.

Distribution of GDP of Saskatchewan, by industry(2018)
% Share of GDP	Sector
8.9	agriculture, forestry, fishing, hunting
14.2	finance, insurance, real estate, leasing
2.5	Professional, scientific and food services
8.14	construction
11.51	education, health, social services
1.74	Accommodation and food services
1.46	Information and cultural industries
5.96	government services
6.43	manufacturing
17.05	mining, quarrying, oil and gas extraction
3.87	other
8.05	transportation, communications, utilities
10.19	wholesale and retail trade

Mining is a major industry in the province, with Saskatchewan being the world's largest exporter of potash and uranium. Oil and natural gas production is also a very important part of Saskatchewan's economy, although the oil industry is larger. Among Canadian provinces, only Alberta exceeds Saskatchewan in overall oil production. Heavy crude is extracted in the Lloydminster-Kerrobert-Kindersley areas. Light crude is found in the Kindersley-Swift Current areas as well as the Weyburn-Estevan fields. Natural gas is found almost entirely in the western part of Saskatchewan, from the Primrose Lake area through Lloydminster, Unity, Kindersley, Leader, and around Maple Creek areas.

Major Saskatchewan-based Crown corporations are Saskatchewan Government Insurance (SGI), SaskTel, SaskEnergy (the province's main supplier of natural gas), SaskPower, and Saskatchewan Crop Insurance Corporation (SCIC). Bombardier runs the NATO Flying Training Centre at 15 Wing, near Moose Jaw. Bombardier was awarded a long-term contract in the late 1990s for $2.8 billion from the federal government for the purchase of military aircraft and the running of the training facility. SaskPower since 1929 has been the principal supplier of electricity in Saskatchewan, serving more than 451,000 customers and managing $4.5 billion in assets. SaskPower is a major employer in the province with almost 2,500 permanent full-time staff in 71 communities.

== Education ==
Publicly funded elementary and secondary schools in the province are administered by twenty-seven school divisions. Public elementary and secondary schools either operate as secular or as a separate schools. Nearly all school divisions, except one operate as an English first language school board. The Division scolaire francophone No. 310 is the only school division that operates French first language schools. In addition to elementary and secondary schools, the province is also home to several post-secondary institutions.

The first education on the prairies took place within the family groups of the First Nations and early fur trading settlers. There were only a few missionary or trading post schools established in Rupert's Land – later known as the North West Territories. The first 76 North-West Territories school districts and the first Board of Education meeting formed in 1886. The pioneering boom formed ethnic bloc settlements. Communities were seeking education for their children similar to the schools of their homeland. Log cabins, and dwellings were constructed for the assembly of the community, school, church, dances and meetings.

The prosperity of the Roaring Twenties and the success of farmers in proving up on their homesteads helped provide funding to standardize education. Textbooks, normal schools for educating teachers, formal school curricula and schoolhouse architectural plans provided continuity throughout the province. English as the school language helped to provide economic stability because one community could communicate with another and goods could be traded and sold in a common language. The number of one-room schoolhouse districts across Saskatchewan totalled approximately 5,000 at the height of this system of education in the late 1940s.

Following World War II, the transition from many one-room schoolhouses to fewer and larger consolidated modern technological town and city schools occurred as a means of ensuring technical education. School buses, highways, and family vehicles create ease and accessibility of a population shift to larger towns and cities. Combines and tractors mean the farmer could manage more than a quarter section of land, so there was a shift from family farms and subsistence crops to cash crops grown on many sections of land. School vouchers have been newly proposed as a means of allowing competition between rural schools and making the operation of cooperative schools practicable in rural areas.

== Healthcare ==
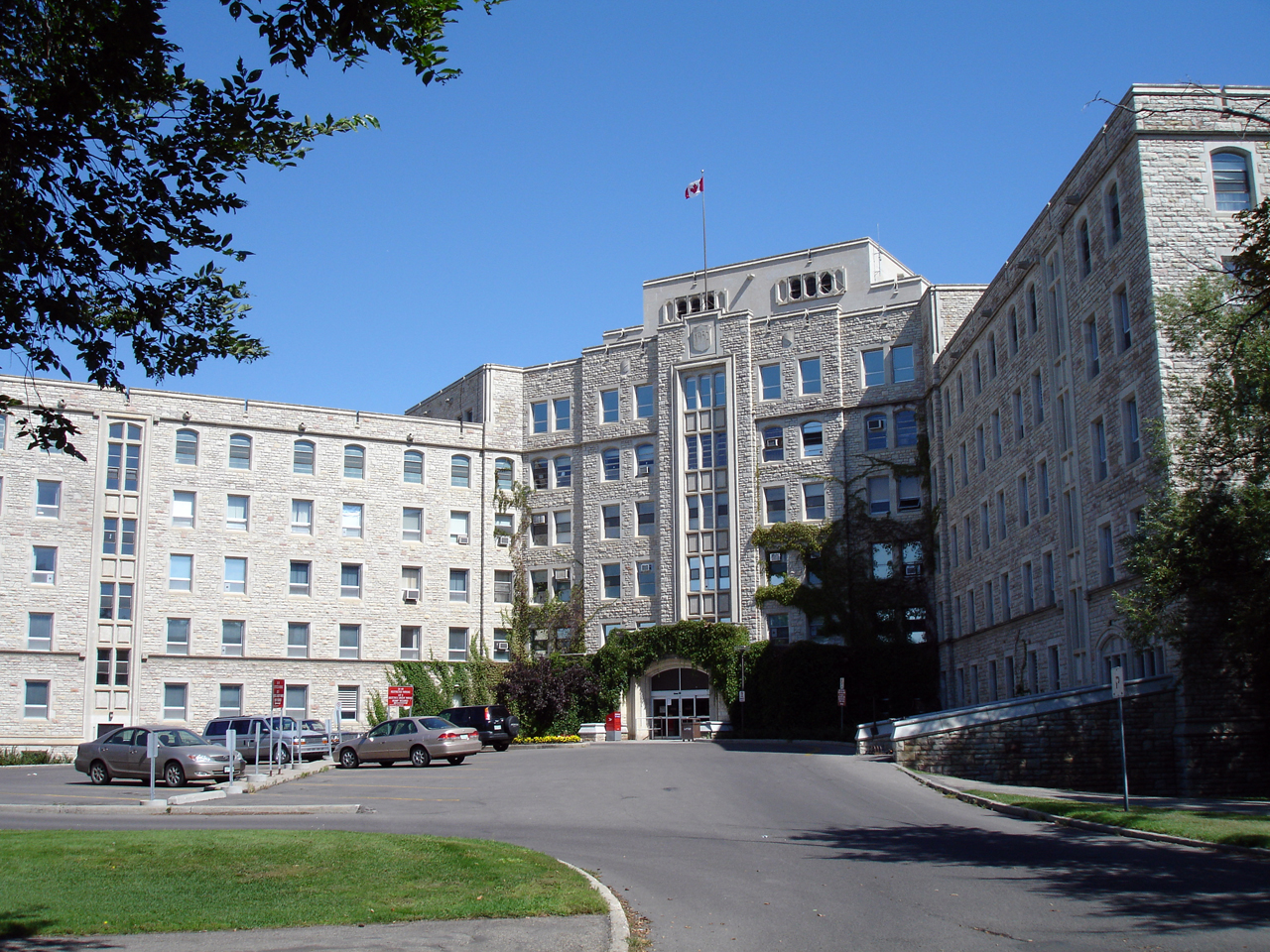
The Royal University Hospital is one of several hospitals operating in Saskatchewan.

Saskatchewan's Ministry of Health is responsible for policy direction, sets and monitors standards, and provides funding for regional health authorities and provincial health services. Saskatchewan's health system is a single-payer system. Medical practitioners in Saskatchewan are independent contractors. They remit their accounts to the publicly funded Saskatchewan Medical Care Insurance Plan, which pays the accounts. Patients do not pay anything to their doctors or hospitals for medical care.

In 1944, the Co-operative Commonwealth Federation (CCF), a left-wing agrarian and labour party, won the provincial election in Saskatchewan and formed the first socialist government in North American history. Repeatedly re-elected, the CCF campaigned in the early 1960s on the theme of universal health coverage and, after winning the election again, implemented it, the first in Canada. However, it was fiercely opposed by the province's doctors' union, which went on a massive strike the day the new system came into effect. Supported by the Saskatchewan Chamber of Commerce, most newspapers and the right-wing Keep Our Doctors movement, the doctors' union ran an effective communications campaign portraying the universal health care system as a communist scheme that would spread disease. The strike, which had become very unpopular because of the outrageous rhetoric of some of its leaders (one of them had called for bloodshed), finally ended after a few weeks, and universal health coverage was adopted by the whole country five years later.

== Government and politics ==
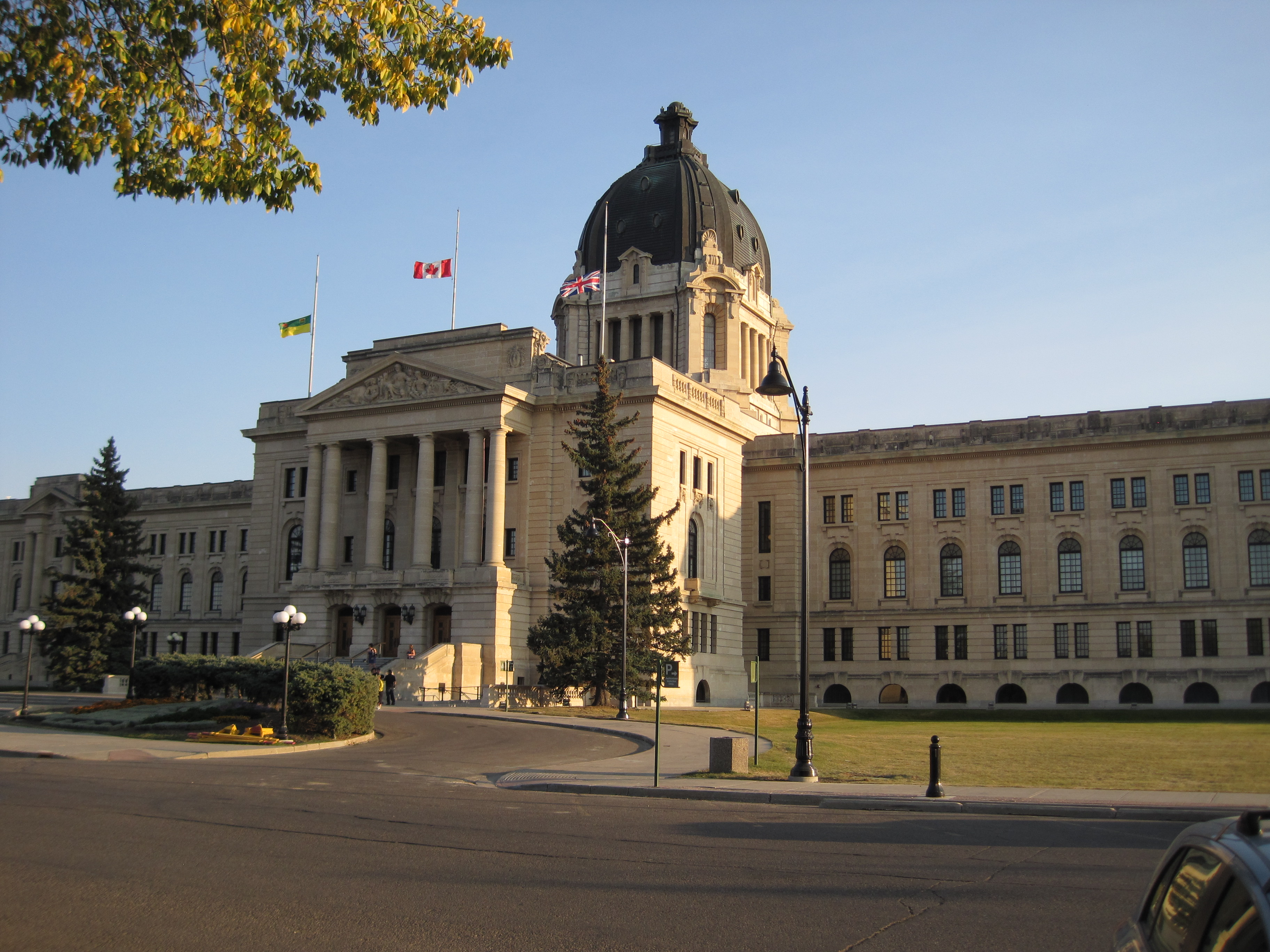
The Saskatchewan Legislative Building is the meeting place for the province's legislative assembly.

Saskatchewan has the same form of government as the other Canadian provinces with a lieutenant-governor (who is the representative of the King in Right of Saskatchewan), premier, and a unicameral legislature.

During the 20th century, Saskatchewan was one of Canada's more left-wing provinces, reflecting the slant of its many rural citizens which distrusted the distant capital government and which favoured a strong local government to attend to their issues. In 1944 Tommy Douglas became premier of the first avowedly socialist regional government in North America. Most of his Members of the Legislative Assembly (MLAs) represented rural and small-town ridings. Under his Cooperative Commonwealth Federation government, Saskatchewan became the first province to have Medicare. In 1961, Douglas left provincial politics to become the first leader of the federal New Democratic Party. In the 21st century, Saskatchewan began to drift to the right-wing, generally attributed to the province's economy shifting toward oil and gas production. In the 2015 federal election, the Conservative Party of Canada won ten of the province's fourteen seats, followed by the New Democratic Party with three and the Liberal Party of Canada with one; in the 2019 election, the Conservatives won in all of Saskatchewan's 14 seats, sweeping their competition, and retained them all in the 2021 election; in the 2025 Canadian federal election, the Liberal Party won a single seat in northern Saskatchewan .

Provincial politics in Saskatchewan is dominated by the social-democratic Saskatchewan New Democratic Party and the centre-right Saskatchewan Party, with the latter holding the majority in the Legislative Assembly of Saskatchewan since 2007. The current Premier of Saskatchewan is Scott Moe, who took over the leadership of the Saskatchewan Party in 2018 following the resignation of Brad Wall. Numerous smaller political parties also run candidates in provincial elections, including the Green Party of Saskatchewan, Buffalo Party of Saskatchewan, Saskatchewan Progress Party, and the Progressive Conservative Party of Saskatchewan, but none is currently represented in the Legislative Assembly.

No Prime Minister of Canada has been born in Saskatchewan, but two (William Lyon Mackenzie King and John Diefenbaker) represented the province in the House of Commons of Canada during their tenures as head of government.

=== Administrative divisions ===
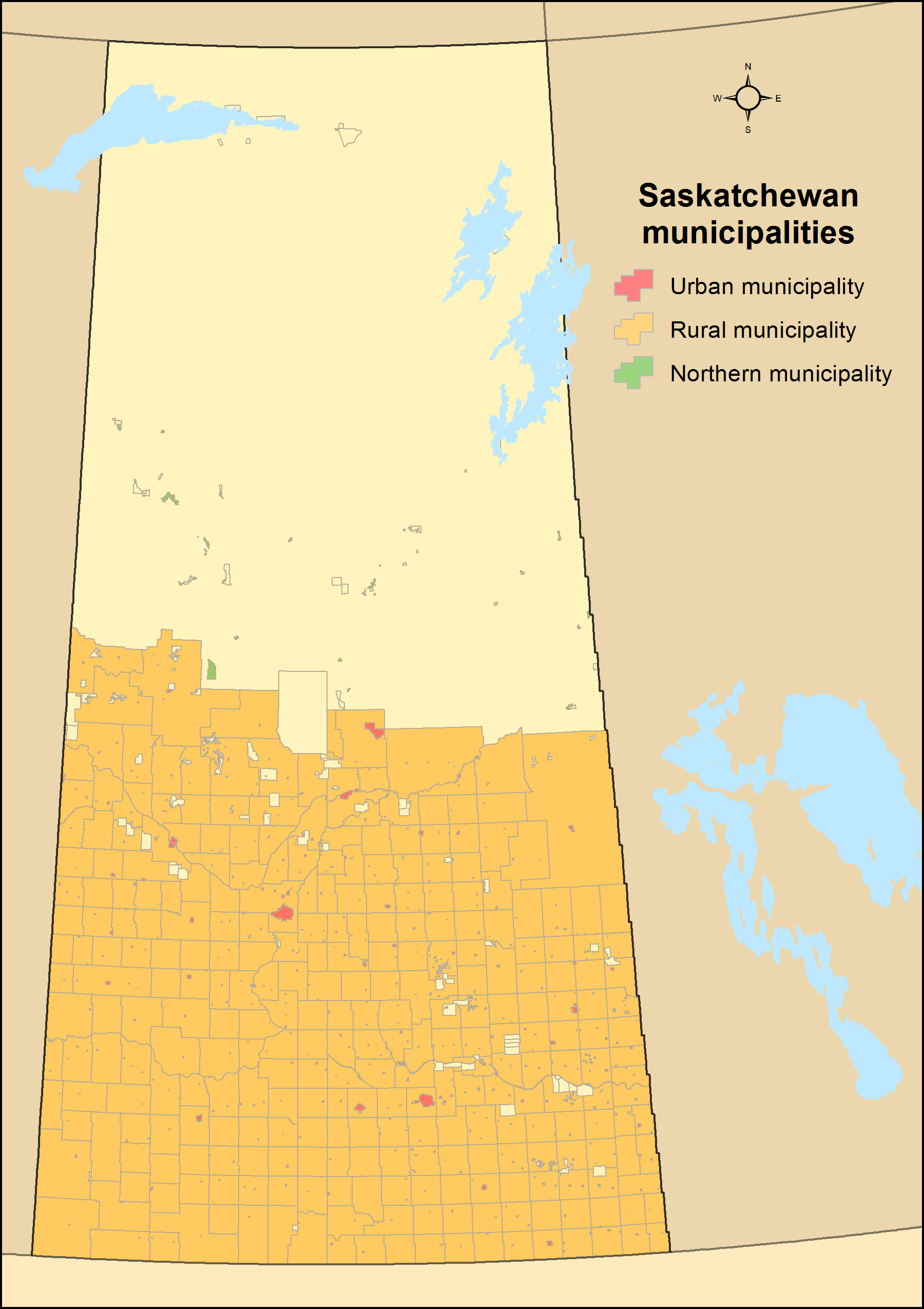
Distribution of Saskatchewan's 466 urban, 296 rural and 24 northern municipalities (2013)

Below the provincial level of government, Saskatchewan is divided into urban and rural municipalities. The Government of Saskatchewan's Ministry of Municipal Relations recognizes three general types of municipalities and seven sub-types – urban municipalities (cities, towns, villages and resort villages), rural municipalities and northern municipalities (northern towns, northern villages and northern hamlets). The vast majority of the land mass of Northern Saskatchewan is within the unorganized Northern Saskatchewan Administration District. Cities are formed under the provincial authority of The Cities Act, which was enacted in 2002. Towns, villages, resort villages and rural municipalities are formed under the authority of The Municipalities Act, enacted in 2005. The three sub-types of northern municipalities are formed under the authority of The Northern Municipalities Act, enacted in 2010.

In 2016, Saskatchewan's 774 municipalities covered 52.7% of the province's land mass and were home to 94.8% of its population. (Note: The remaining 5.2% of Saskatchewan's population resides on Indian reserves, Indian settlements, the vast unincorporated portions of the Northern Saskatchewan Administration District and Prince Albert National Park. Together, they occupy the remaining 47.3% of the province's land mass.)

These 774 municipalities are local government "creatures of provincial jurisdiction" with legal personhood. One of the key purposes of Saskatchewan's municipalities are "to provide services, facilities and other things that, in the opinion of council, are necessary or desirable for all or a part of the municipality". Other purposes are to: "provide good government"; "develop and maintain a safe and viable community"; "foster economic, social and environmental well-being" and "provide wise stewardship of public assets".

== Transportation ==
Transportation in Saskatchewan includes an infrastructure system of roads, highways, freeways, airports, ferries, pipelines, trails, waterways and railway systems serving a population of approximately 1,003,299 (according to 2007 estimates) inhabitants year-round. The Saskatchewan Department of Highways and Transportation estimates 80% of traffic is carried on the 5,031-kilometre principal system of highways.

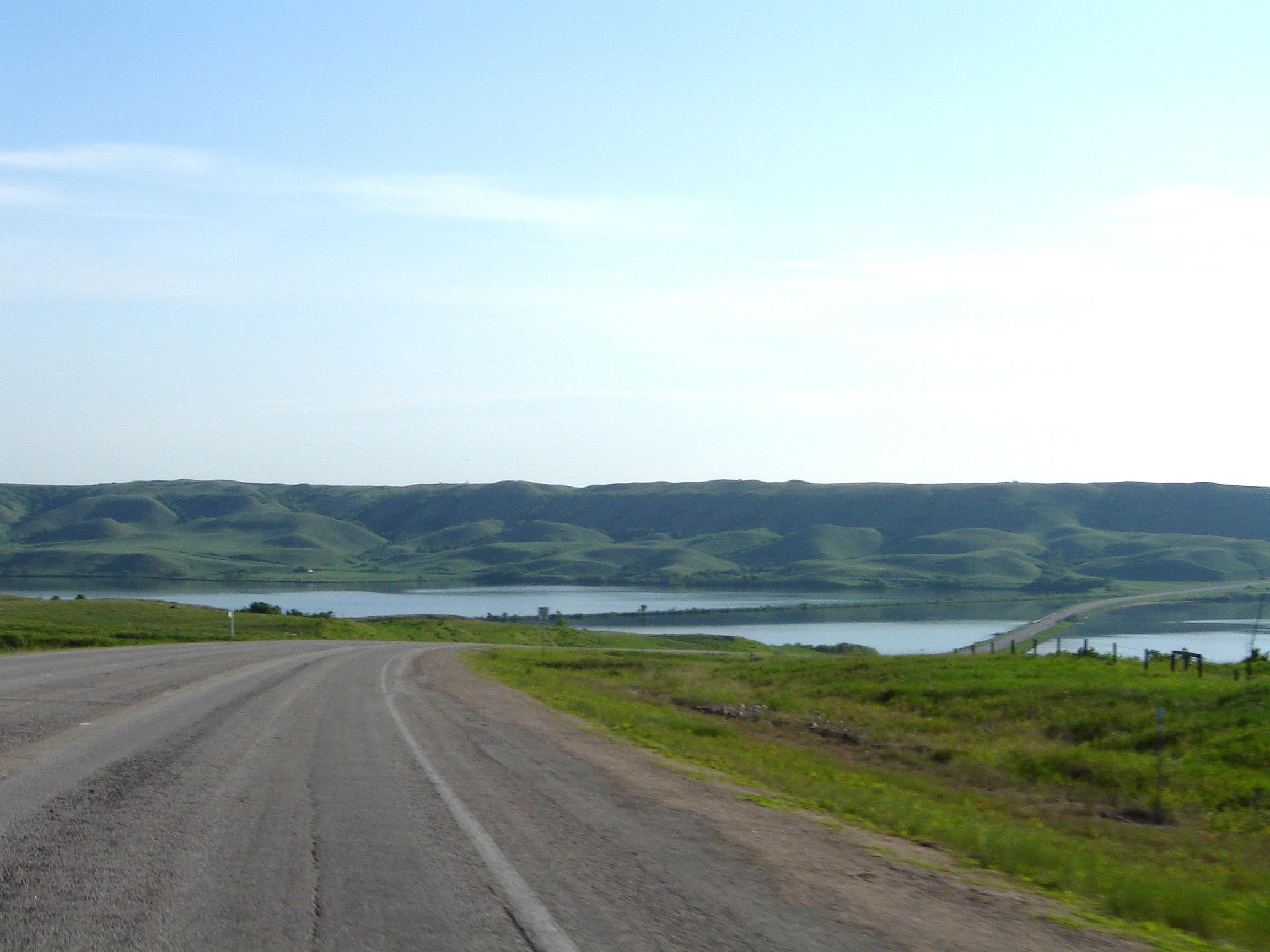
The CanAm Highway near Buffalo Pound Lake

The Ministry of Highways and Infrastructure operates over 26,000 km (16,000 mi) of highways and divided highways. There are also municipal roads which comprise different surfaces. Asphalt concrete pavements comprise almost 9,000 km (5,600 mi), granular pavement almost 5,000 km (3,100 mi), non structural or thin membrane surface TMS are close to 7,000 km (4,300 mi) and finally gravel highways make up over 5,600 km (3,500 mi) through the province. In the northern sector, ice roads which can only be navigated in the winter months comprise another approximately 150 km (93 mi) of travel. In 2024, the Government of Canada provided Saskatchewan with a $6.1-million grant for shuttle buses serving remote communities.

Saskatchewan has over 250,000 km (160,000 mi) of roads and highways, the highest length of road surface of any Canadian province. The major highways in Saskatchewan are the Trans-Canada Highway, Yellowhead Highway northern Trans Canada route, Louis Riel Trail, CanAm Highway, Red Coat Trail, Northern Woods and Water route, and Saskota travel route.

The first Canadian transcontinental railway was constructed by the Canadian Pacific Railway (CPR) between 1881 and 1885. After the great east–west transcontinental railway was built, north–south connector branch lines were established. The 1920s saw the largest rise in rail line track as the CPR and Canadian National Railway (CNR) fell into competition to provide rail service within ten kilometres. In the 1960s there were applications for abandonment of branch lines. Today the only two passenger rail services in the province are The Canadian and Winnipeg–Churchill train, both operated by Via Rail. The Canadian is a transcontinental service linking Toronto with Vancouver.

The main Saskatchewan waterways are the North Saskatchewan River or South Saskatchewan River routes. In total, there are 3,050 bridges maintained by the Department of Highways in Saskatchewan. There are currently twelve ferry services operating in the province, all under the jurisdiction of the Department of Highways.

The Saskatoon Airport was initially established as part of the Royal Canadian Air Force training program during World War II. It was renamed the John G. Diefenbaker Airport in 1993. Roland J. Groome Airfield is the official designation for the Regina International Airport as of 2005; the airport was established in 1930.

Airlines offering service to Saskatchewan are Air Canada, WestJet, Delta Air Lines, Transwest Air, Sunwing Airlines, Norcanair Airlines, La Ronge Aviation Services Ltd, La Loche Airways, Osprey Wings Ltd, Buffalo Narrows Airways Ltd, Île-à-la-Crosse Airways Ltd, Voyage Air, Pronto Airways, Venture Air Ltd, Pelican Narrows Air Service, Jackson Air Services Ltd, and Northern Dene Airways Ltd.

The Government of Canada agreed to contribute $20 million for two new interchanges in Saskatoon. One of them being at the Highway 219/Lorne Avenue intersection with Circle Drive, the other at the Senator Sid Buckwold Bridge (Idylwyld Freeway) and Circle Drive. This is part of the Asia-Pacific Gateway and Corridor Initiative to improve access to the CNR's intermodal freight terminal thereby increasing Asia-Pacific trade. Also, the Government of Canada will contribute $27 million to Regina to construct a CPR intermodal facility and improve infrastructure transportation to the facility from both national highway networks, Highway 1, the Trans-Canada Highway and Highway 11, Louis Riel Trail. This also is part of the Asia-Pacific Gateway and Corridor Initiative to improve access to the CPR terminal and increase Asia-Pacific trade.

== Culture ==
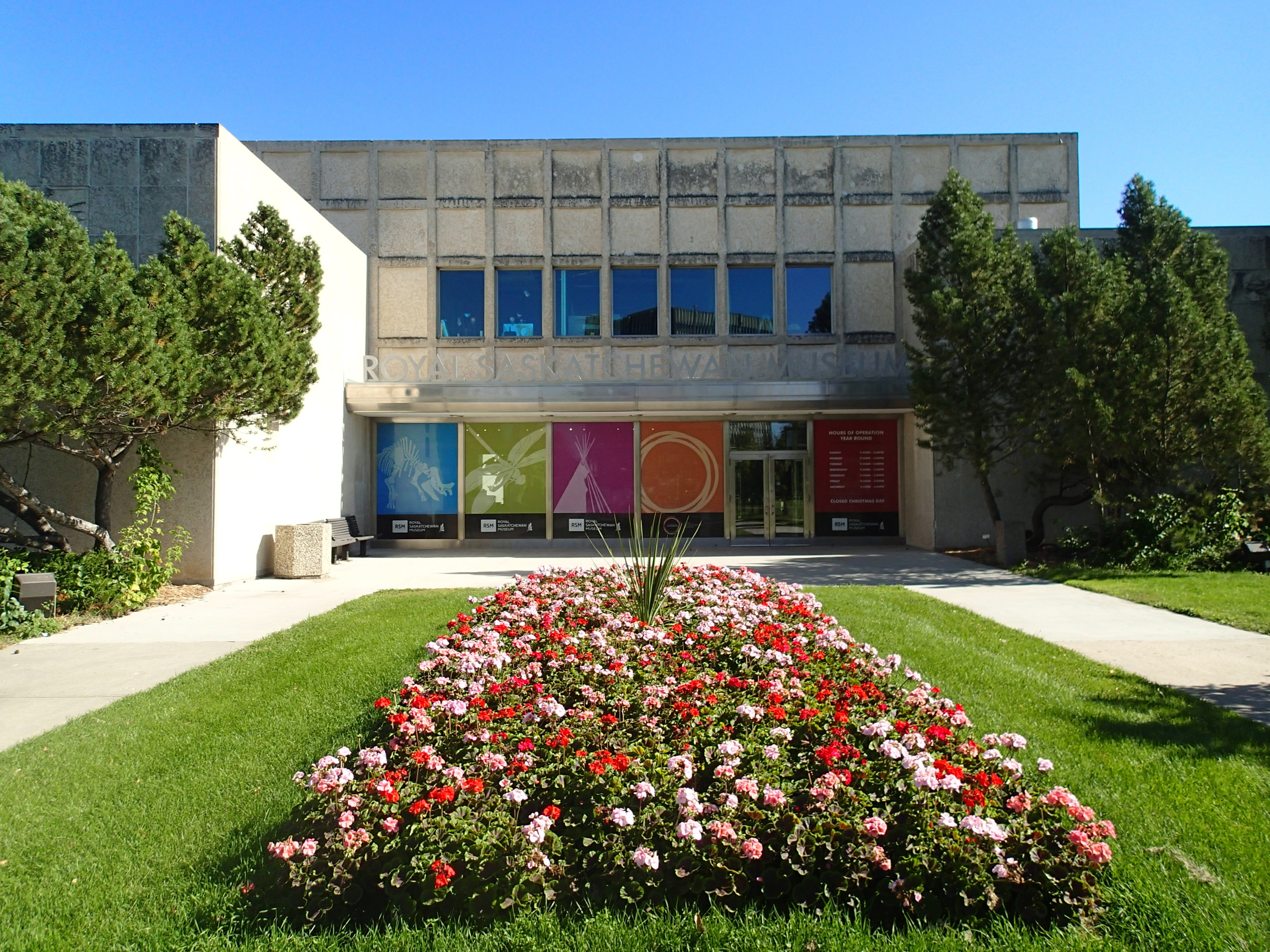
The Royal Saskatchewan Museum is a natural history museum based in Saskatchewan.

Saskatchewan is home to a number of museums. The Royal Saskatchewan Museum is the provincial museum of the province. Other museums include Diefenbaker House, Evolution of Education Museum, Museum of Antiquities, the RCMP Heritage Centre, Rotary Museum of Police and Corrections, Saskatchewan Science Centre, Saskatchewan Western Development Museum, and the T.rex Discovery Centre.

=== Art ===
The province is home to several art galleries, including MacKenzie Art Gallery, and Remai Modern. The province is also home to several performing arts centres including the Conexus Arts Centre in Regina, and TCU Place in Saskatoon. PAVED Arts, a new media artist-run space, is also in Saskatoon.

=== Music ===
The province is presently home to several concert orchestras, the Regina Symphony Orchestra, the Saskatoon Symphony Orchestra, and the Saskatoon Youth Orchestra. The Regina Symphony Orchestra is at the Conexus Arts Centre, while the Saskatoon performs at TCU Place.

=== Literature ===
A leading writer from Saskatchewan is W. O. Mitchell (1914–1998), born in Weyburn. His best-loved novel is Who Has Seen the Wind (1947), which portrays life on the Canadian Prairies and sold almost a million copies in Canada. As a broadcaster, he is known for his radio series Jake and the Kid, which aired on CBC Radio between 1950 and 1956 and was also about life on the Prairies.

== Sports ==
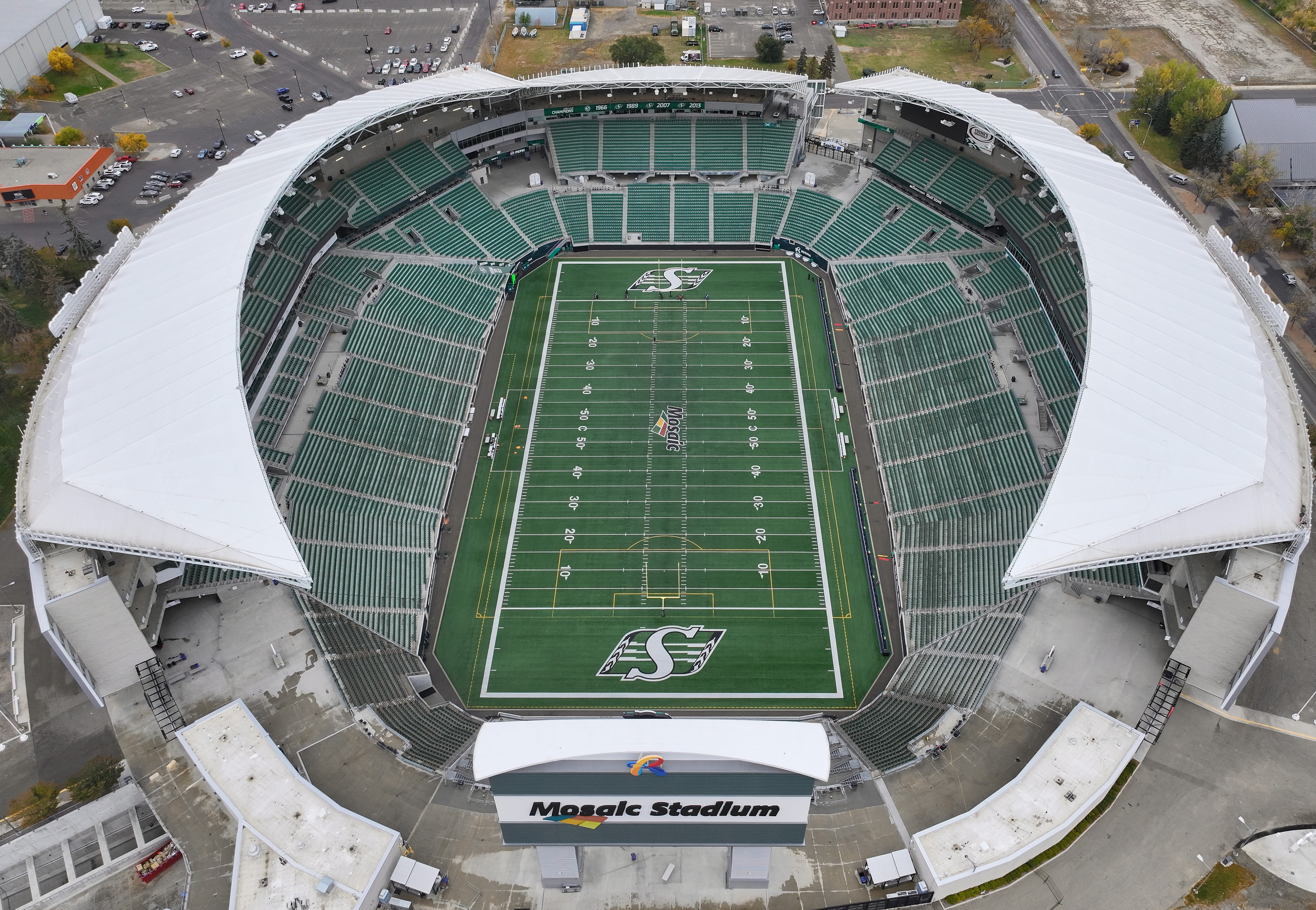
Mosaic Stadium is the home stadium for the Saskatchewan Roughriders, a professional Canadian football team.

Hockey is the most popular sport in Saskatchewan. More than 500 National Hockey League (NHL) players have been born in Saskatchewan, the highest per capita output of any Canadian province, U.S. state, or European country. This includes Gordie Howe, dubbed "Mr. Hockey" and widely regarded as one of the greatest hockey players of all time. Some other notable NHL figures born in Saskatchewan include Keith Allen, Bryan Trottier, Bernie Federko, Clark Gillies, Fernie Flaman, Fred Sasakamoose, Bert Olmstead, Harry Watson, Elmer Lach, Max Bentley, Sid Abel, Doug Bentley, Eddie Shore, Clint Smith, Bryan Hextall, Johnny Bower, Emile Francis, Glenn Hall, Chuck Rayner, Wendel Clark, Brad McCrimmon, Mike Babcock, Patrick Marleau, Theo Fleury, Terry Harper, Wade Redden, Brian Propp, Ryan Getzlaf, Chris Kunitz, Kelly Chase, and Jordan Eberle. A number of prominent women's hockey players and figures have come from the province as well, including Hayley Wickenheiser, Colleen Sostorics, Gina Kingsbury, Shannon Miller, and Emily Clark. Wickenheiser was the first female skater to play full-time professional hockey in a men's league and is regarded as one of the greatest hockey players of all time. Saskatchewan does not have a professional hockey franchise, but five teams in the junior Western Hockey League are based in the province: the Moose Jaw Warriors, Prince Albert Raiders, Regina Pats, Saskatoon Blades, and Swift Current Broncos.

The Saskatchewan Roughriders are the province's professional Canadian football team playing in the Canadian Football League, and are based in Regina but popular across Saskatchewan. The team's fans are also found to congregate on game days throughout Canada, and collectively they are known as "Rider Nation". The Roughriders are one of the oldest professional sports teams and community-owned franchises in North America and have won five Grey Cup championships. The province also has successful women's football teams. The Saskatoon Valkyries and the Regina Riot are the only two teams to win championships in the Western Women's Canadian Football League since it began play in 2011.

The province is home to two other professional sports franchises. The Saskatchewan Rush play in the National Lacrosse League. In 2016, their first year after relocating from Edmonton, Alberta, the Rush won both their division title and the league championship. In 2018, the province received a Canadian Elite Basketball League franchise, the Saskatoon Mamba, which won the league's inaugural championship in 2019. The Saskatchewan Heat are a semi-professional team in the National Ringette League. The province has five teams in the Western Canadian Baseball League.

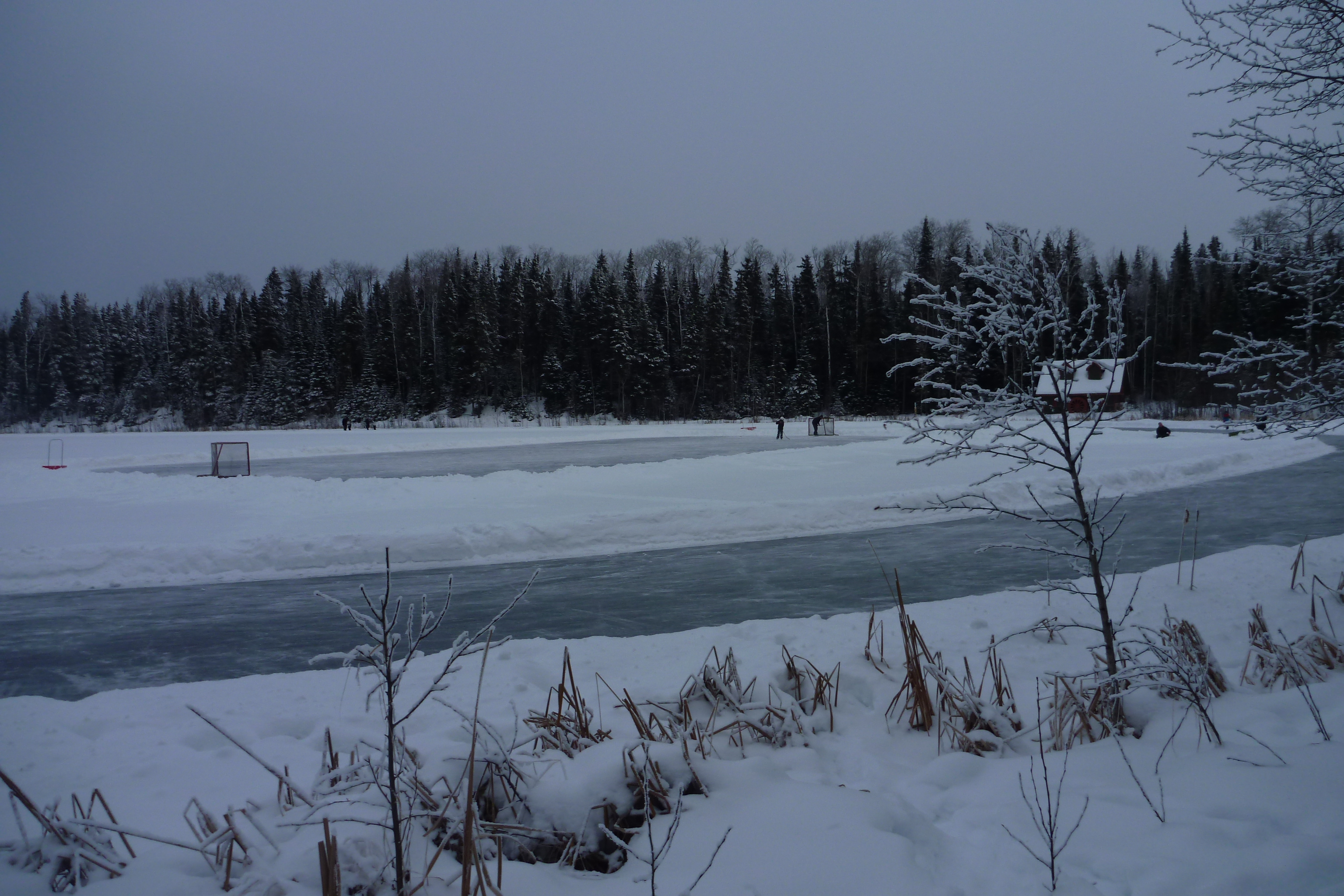
A pond hockey rink set up on Emma Lake

Curling is the province's official sport and, historically, Saskatchewan has been one of the strongest curling provinces. Teams from Saskatchewan have won seven Canadian men's championships, five world men's championships, eleven Canadian women's championships, and four world women's championships. Notable curlers from Saskatchewan include Ernie Richardson, Joyce McKee, Vera Pezer, Rick Folk, Sandra Schmirler, and Ben Hebert. In a 2019 poll conducted by The Sports Network (TSN), experts ranked Schmirler's Saskatchewan team, which won the gold medal at the 1998 Olympics, as the greatest women's team in Canada's history.

Sports teams in Saskatchewan
Team	City	League	Since	Stadium/arena	Capacity
Saskatchewan Roughriders	Regina	Canadian Football League	1910	Mosaic Stadium	33,350
Saskatchewan Rush	Saskatoon	National Lacrosse League	2016	SaskTel Centre	15,100
Regina Pats	Regina	Canadian Hockey League	1917	Brandt Centre	6,000
Saskatoon Blades	Saskatoon	Canadian Hockey League	1966	SaskTel Centre	15,100
Saskatoon Mamba	Saskatoon	Canadian Elite Basketball League	2019	SaskTel Centre	15,100
Swift Current Broncos	Swift Current	Canadian Hockey League	1967	Innovation Credit Union iPlex	2,879
Prince Albert Raiders	Prince Albert	Canadian Hockey League	1982	Art Hauser Centre	2,580
Moose Jaw Warriors	Moose Jaw	Canadian Hockey League	1984	Mosaic Place	4,414
Saskatoon Valkyries	Saskatoon	Western Women's Canadian Football League	2010	Saskatoon Minor Football Field	5,000
Regina Riot	Regina	Western Women's Canadian Football League	2010	Leibel Field	1,200

== Symbols ==
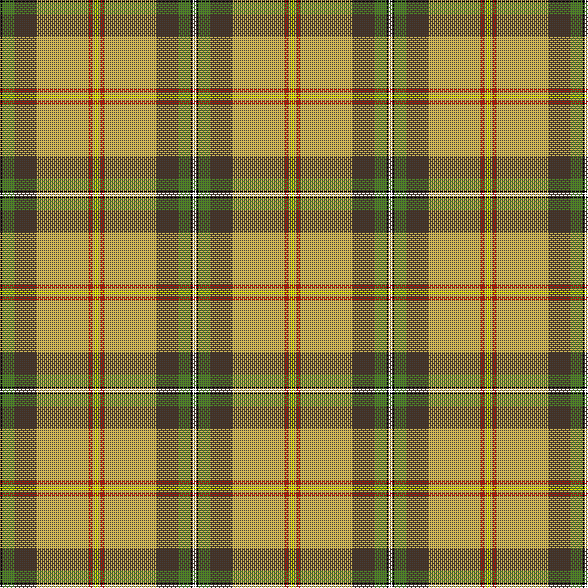
The official tartan of Saskatchewan, created in 1961

The flag of Saskatchewan was officially adopted on September 22, 1969. The flag features the provincial shield in the upper quarter nearest the staff, with the floral emblem, the Prairie lily, in the fly. The upper green (in forest green) half of the flag represents the northern Saskatchewan forest lands, while the golden lower half of the flag symbolizes the southern wheat fields and prairies. A province-wide competition was held to design the flag, and drew over 4,000 entries. The winning design was by Anthony Drake, then living in Hodgeville.

In 2005, Saskatchewan Environment held a province-wide vote to recognize Saskatchewan's centennial year, receiving more than 10,000 online and mail-in votes from the public. The walleye was the overwhelming favourite of the six native fish species nominated for the designation, receiving more than half the votes cast. Other species in the running were the lake sturgeon, lake trout, lake whitefish, northern pike and yellow perch.

Saskatchewan's other symbols include the tartan, the licence plate, and the provincial flower. Saskatchewan's official tartan was registered with the Court of Lord Lyon King of Arms in Scotland in 1961. It has seven colours: gold, brown, green, red, yellow, white and black. The provincial licence plates display the slogan "Land of Living Skies". The provincial flower of Saskatchewan is the western red lily.

=== Centennial celebrations ===
In 2005, Saskatchewan celebrated its centennial. To honour it, the Royal Canadian Mint issued a commemorative five-dollar coin depicting Canada's wheat fields as well as a circulation 25-cent coin of a similar design. Queen Elizabeth II and Prince Philip visited Regina, Saskatoon, and Lumsden, and the Saskatchewan-reared Joni Mitchell issued an album in Saskatchewan's honour.

== See also ==
- Time in Saskatchewan
- Outline of Saskatchewan
- Index of Saskatchewan-related articles
