= Saskatoon Health Region =

Medical Care Services

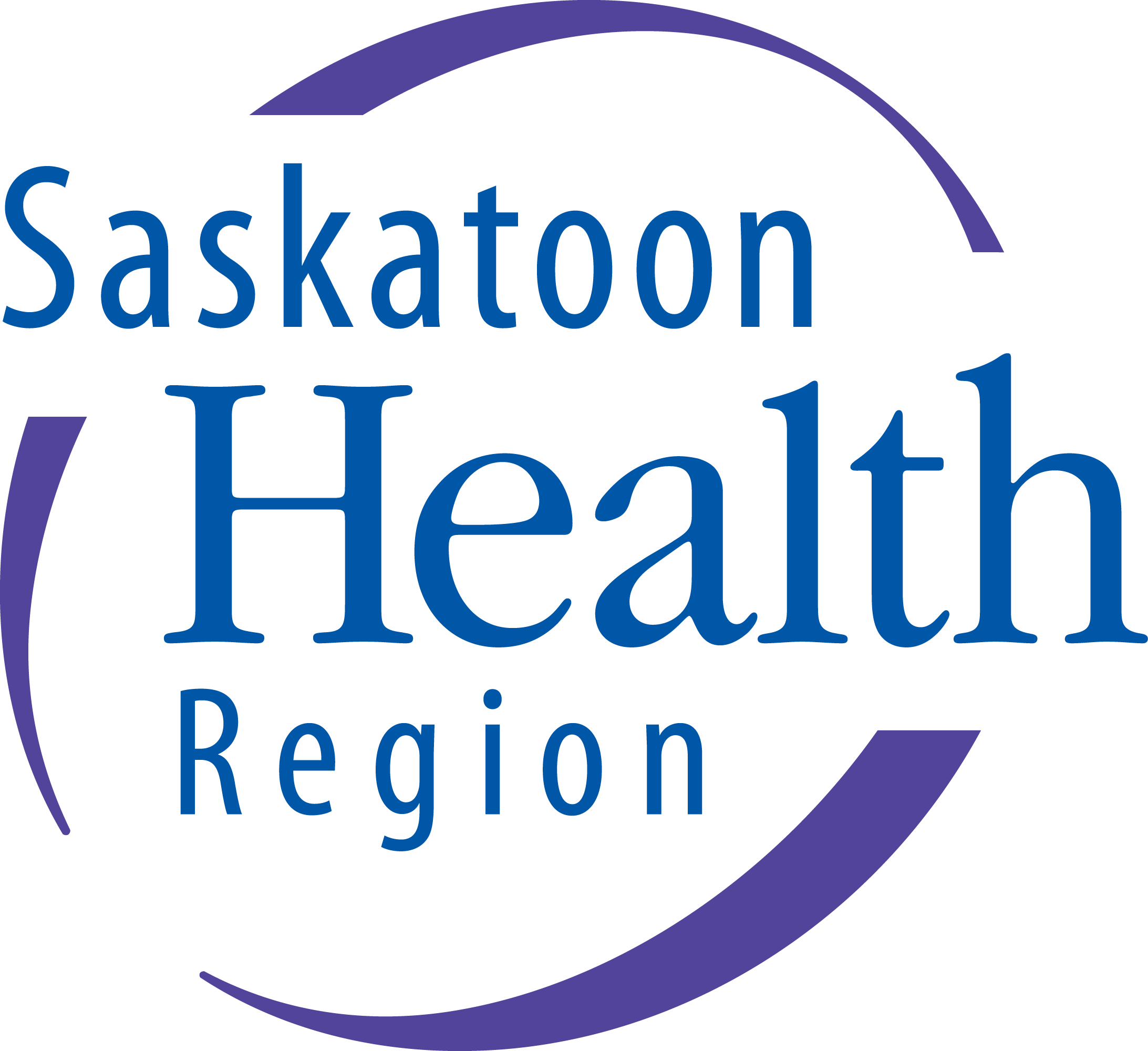
Logo of the Saskatoon Health Region

The Saskatoon Health Region was the largest health region in Saskatchewan, Canada. Primarily based in the city of Saskatoon, the health region operated out of 75 facilities, including 10 hospitals, 29 long term care facilities, and numerous primary health care sites, public health centres, mental health and addictions centres, and community-based facilities. The health region was the largest employer in the province with a staff of over 13,500.

As of December 4, 2017, it is considered defunct, as all health regions in Saskatchewan have been replaced by the Saskatchewan Health Authority.

== Major referral hospitals ==
The city of Saskatoon has three major hospitals that serve the local community as well as being referral centers within the region and province:

- Royal University Hospital
- Saskatoon City Hospital
- St. Paul's Hospital

== Regional hospitals ==
The following regional hospitals are located in larger communities within the region:

- Lanigan Hospital (Lanigan)
- Rosthern Hospital (Rosthern)
- Humboldt District Hospital (Humboldt)
- Wadena Hospital (Wadena)
- Wakaw Hospital (Wakaw)
- Watrous Hospital (Watrous)
- Wynyard Hospital (Wynyard)

== Community Health Centres ==
- Borden Primary Health Centre (Borden)
- Delisle Primary Health Centre (Delisle)
- LeRoy Community Health & Social Centre (LeRoy, Saskatchewan)
- Nokomis Health Centre (Nokomis)
- Quill Lake Community Health & Social Centre (Quill Lake)
- Spalding Community Health Centre (Spalding)
- Strasbourg & District Health Centre (Strasbourg)
- Watson Community Health Centre (Watson)
- Wynyard Community Health Centre (Wynyard)
