= University of Saskatchewan academics =

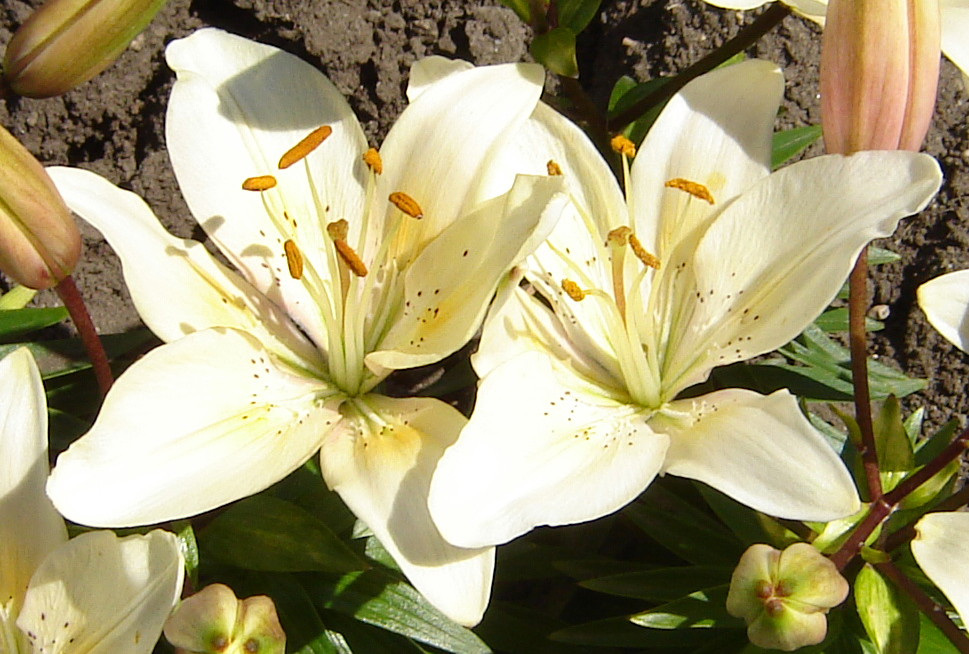
Lilium University of Saskatchewan - The University of Saskatchewan Centennial Lily

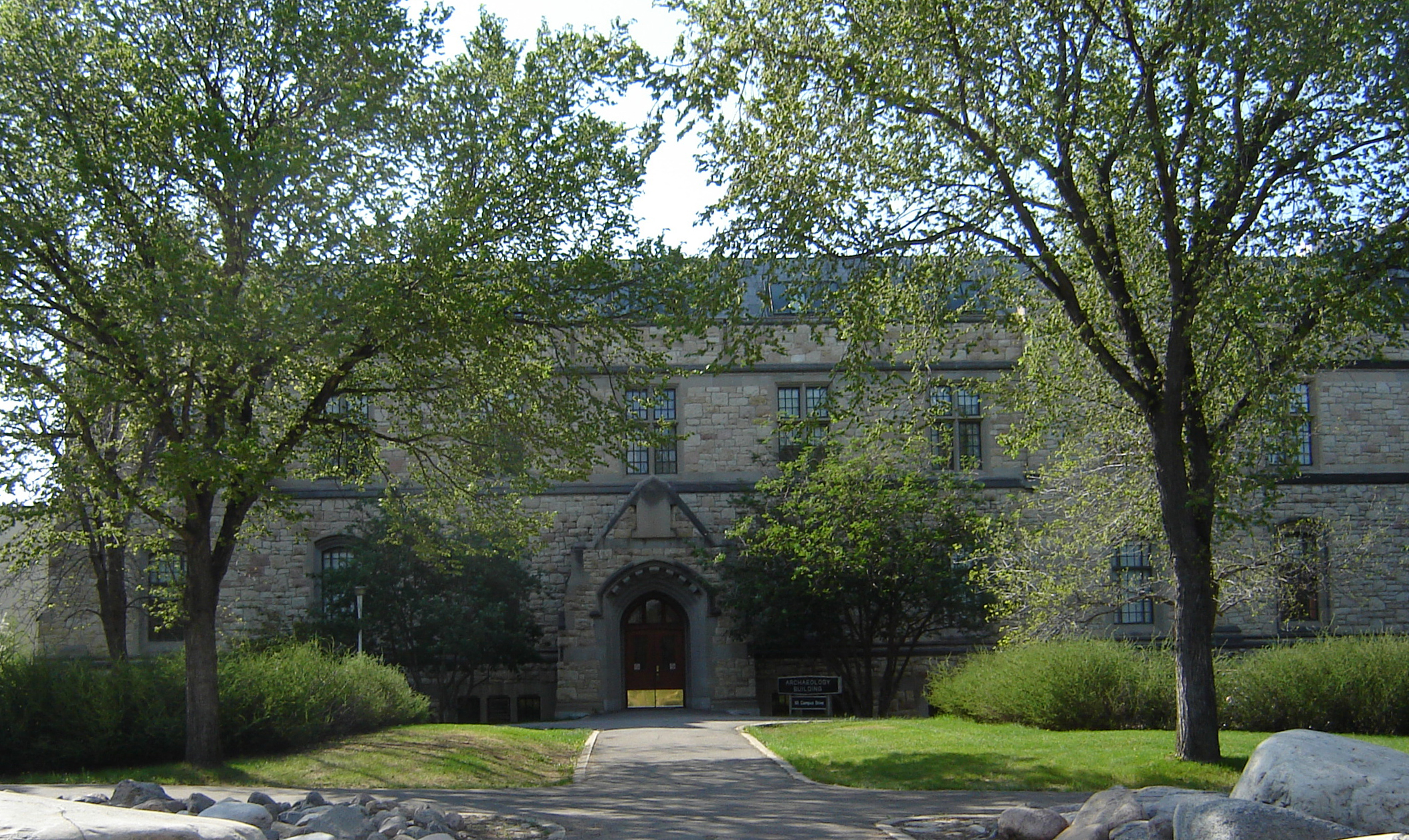
Archaeology Building, University of Saskatchewan

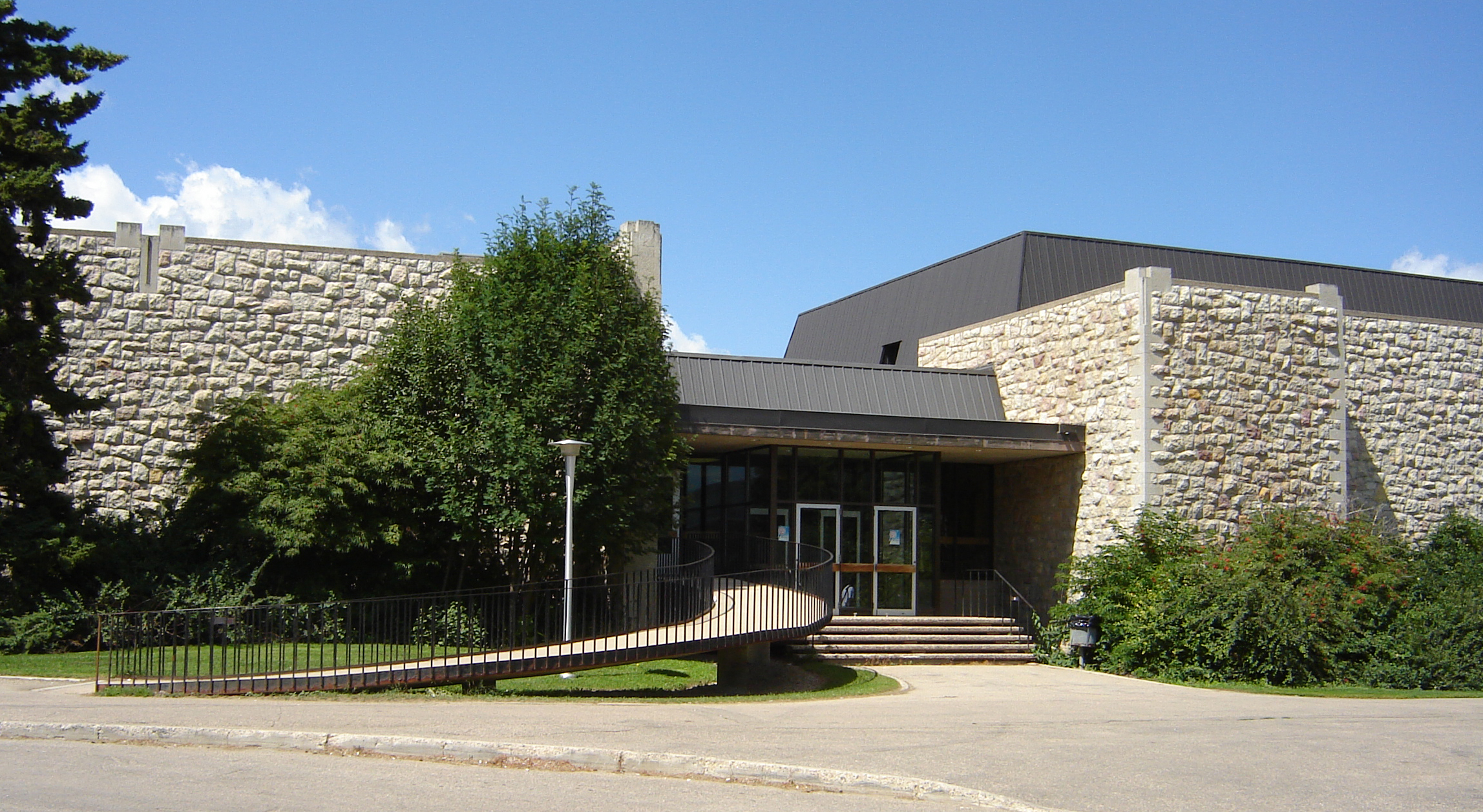
Physics Building, University of Saskatchewan

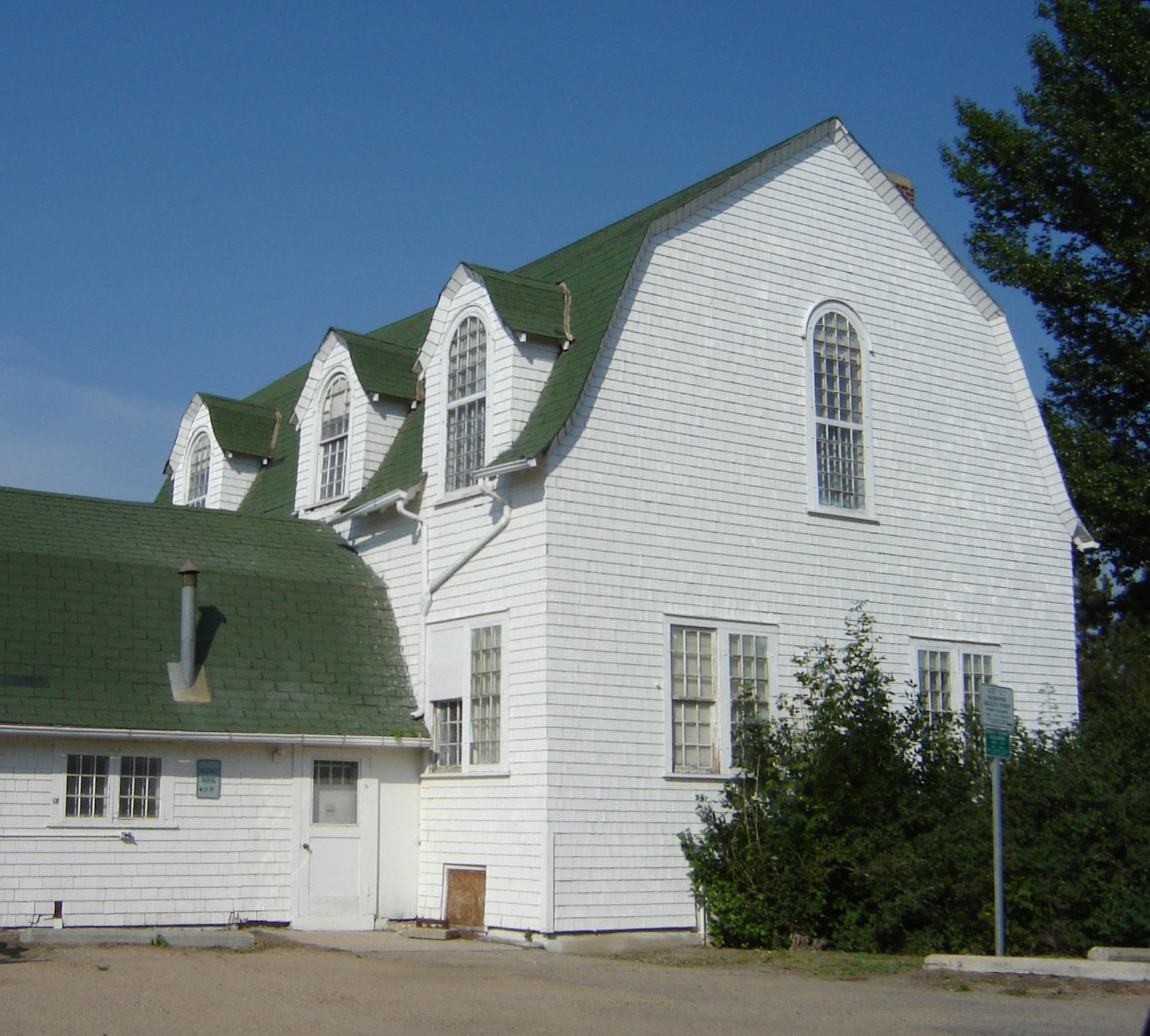
Poultry Science Building

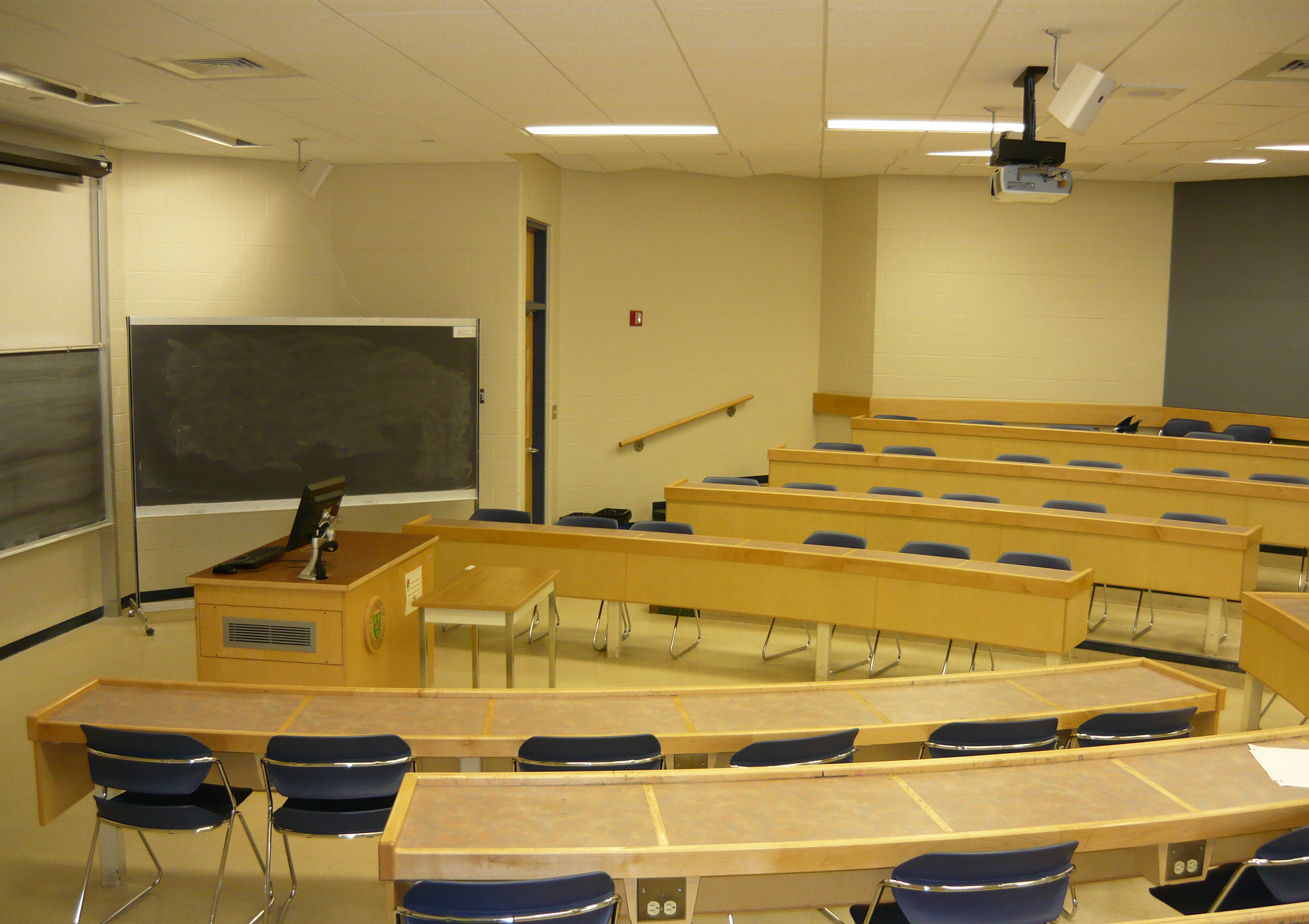
Typical classroom

The University of Saskatchewan has over 200 academic programs on its Saskatoon, Saskatchewan, campus and is internationally known for its teaching and research. The on-campus synchrotron Canadian Light Source makes it the only Canadian institution for such nuclear and biotechnology research. Canadian Light Source nuclear research facility provides research and analysis of the internal structures of advanced materials and biological samples. The College of Arts and Science is the largest of the U of S and comprises five separate health science fields in addition to numerous other programs in the Arts, Social Sciences, Humanities, and Natural Sciences. The Department of Computer Science as well as the College of Engineering are ranked highly within their fields. The founding college, the College of Agriculture, is still providing agricultural breakthroughs which are utilized worldwide.

== Rankings ==
The University of Saskatchewan ranked among the top ten medical doctoral universities in Canada, according to Maclean's Guide to Canadian Universities 2007. The Gourman Report Ranking of Canadian Universities gave the U of S a score of 3.28, which places it 20th out of 60 Canadian universities. The Sidhpur Foundation places the University of Saskatchewan at spot 14 out of the top 25 universities in Canada. The National Post and Financial Post "Top 500" ranking of Universities places the U of S 13th among the top 20 Canadian universities, with a population of 15,397 and revenue of $566,596,000. Times Higher Education is a weekly British magazine that reports specifically on news and issues related to higher education. As part of this, they produce an annual ranking of over 1,800 universities from across the world. The University of Saskatchewan is currently situated in the top third of all universities ranked. University rankings - Office of Institutional Planning and Assessment | University of Saskatchewan

== Research ==
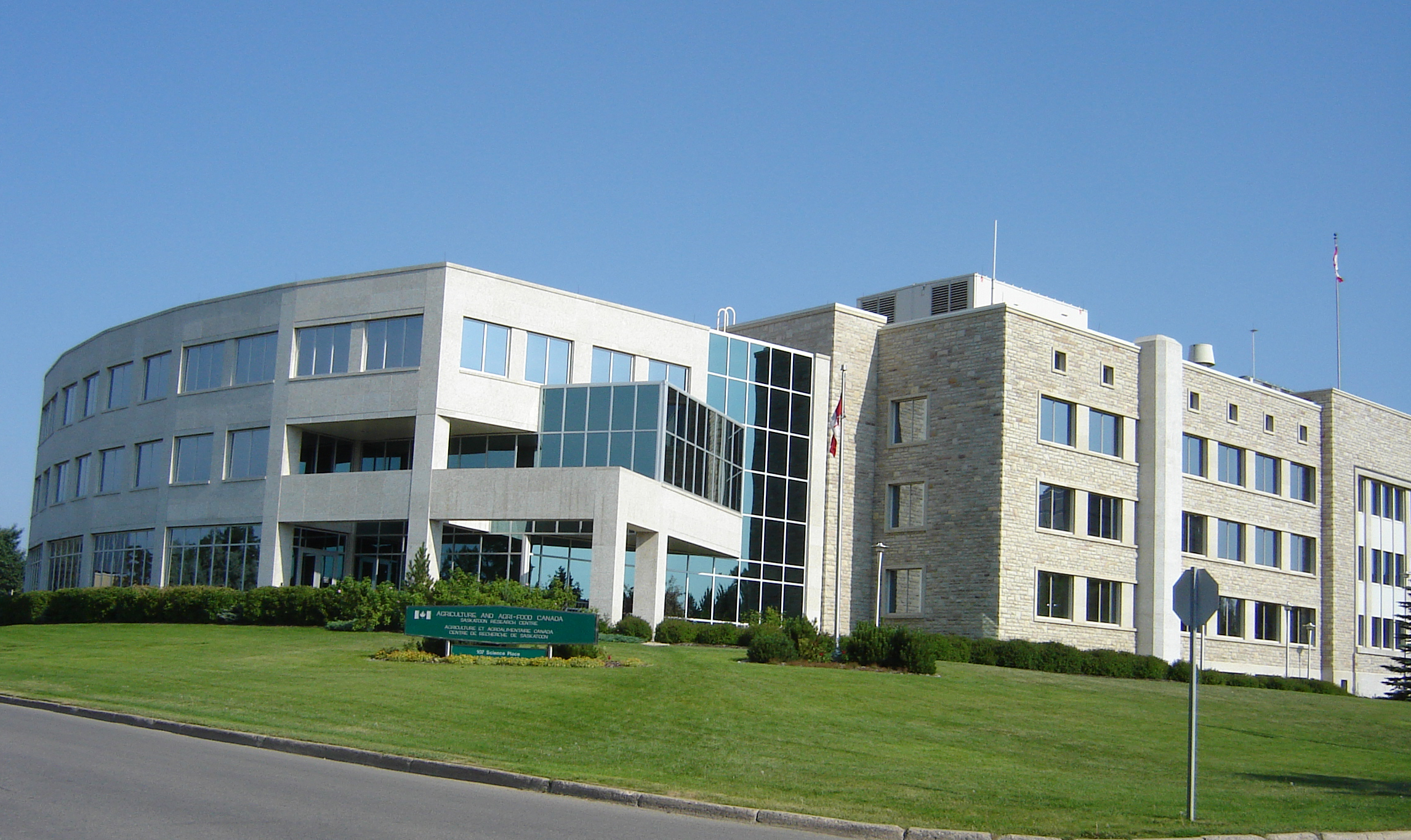
Agriculture Agri-Food Canada Saskatoon Research Centre on campus

1967 saw the origin of the Department of Computational Science at the U of S. Just 29 years later in 1996, the department's research was rated as Number 1 by the Institute for Scientific Information in terms of influence in this field. University of Saskatchewan-owned Canadian Light Source opened in 2004, and is an internationally renowned synchrotron science facility. The linear accelerator was the precursor to the Canadian Light source for molecular and nuclear physics research. The U of S synchrotron has produced a world leader in agriculture biotechnology and livestock genomics which also feature breakthroughs in chemistry, geochemistry, pharmacology and proteomics. Winter wheat projects, rust resistant wheat strains, and the development of rapeseed were just a few of the agricultural research developments.

== Endowment ==
The University of Saskatchewan had endowments worth $136.7 million at fiscal year-end 2007. The Western Grains Research Foundation is among several others that have provided the university with an ongoing endowment research fund.

== Undergraduate studies ==
=== Direct entry programs ===
The following colleges have no university-level prerequisites, and admit students directly out of high school.

==== College of Agriculture and Bioresources ====
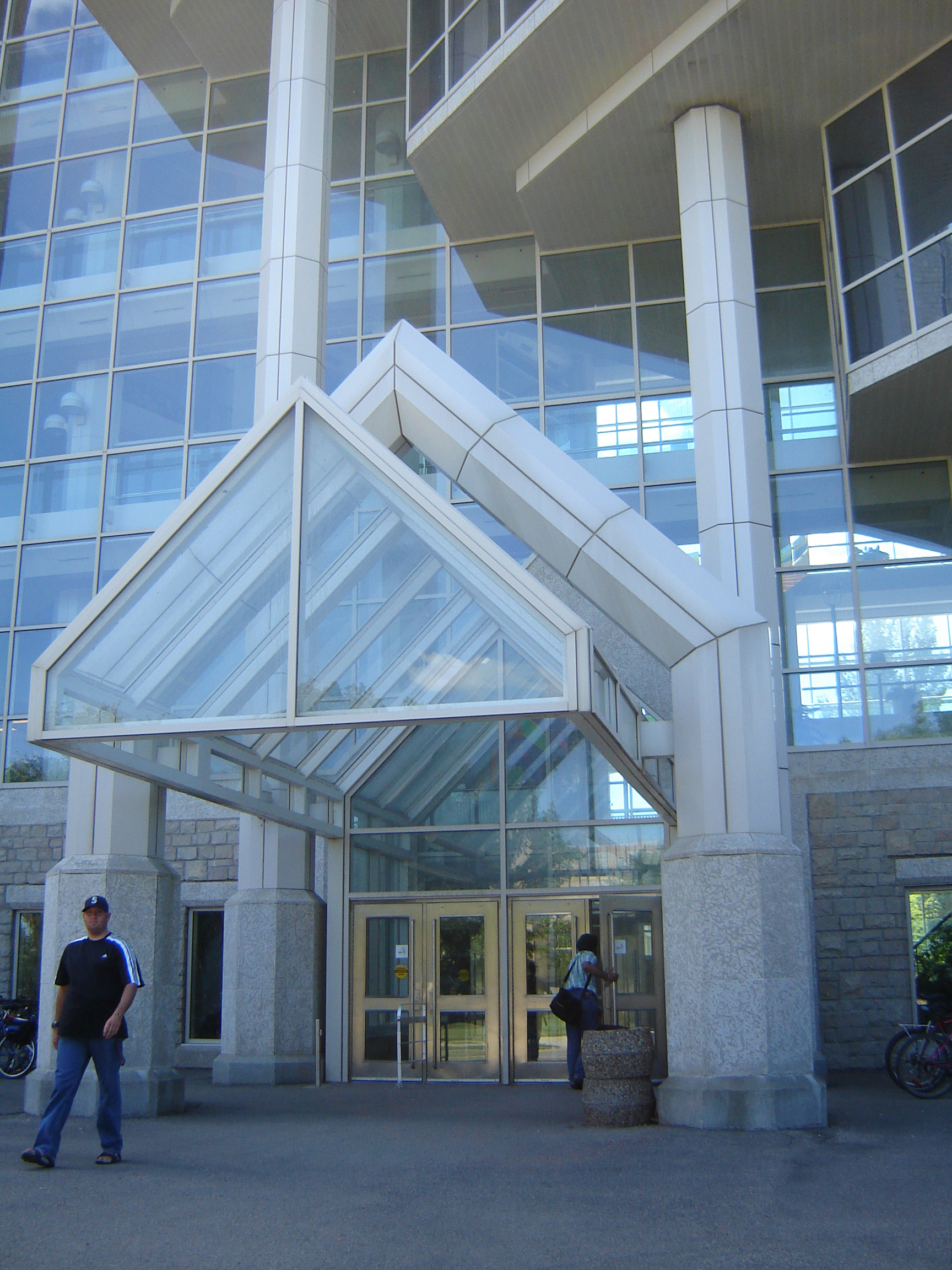
Entrance Agriculture and Bioresources College Building, University of Saskatchewan

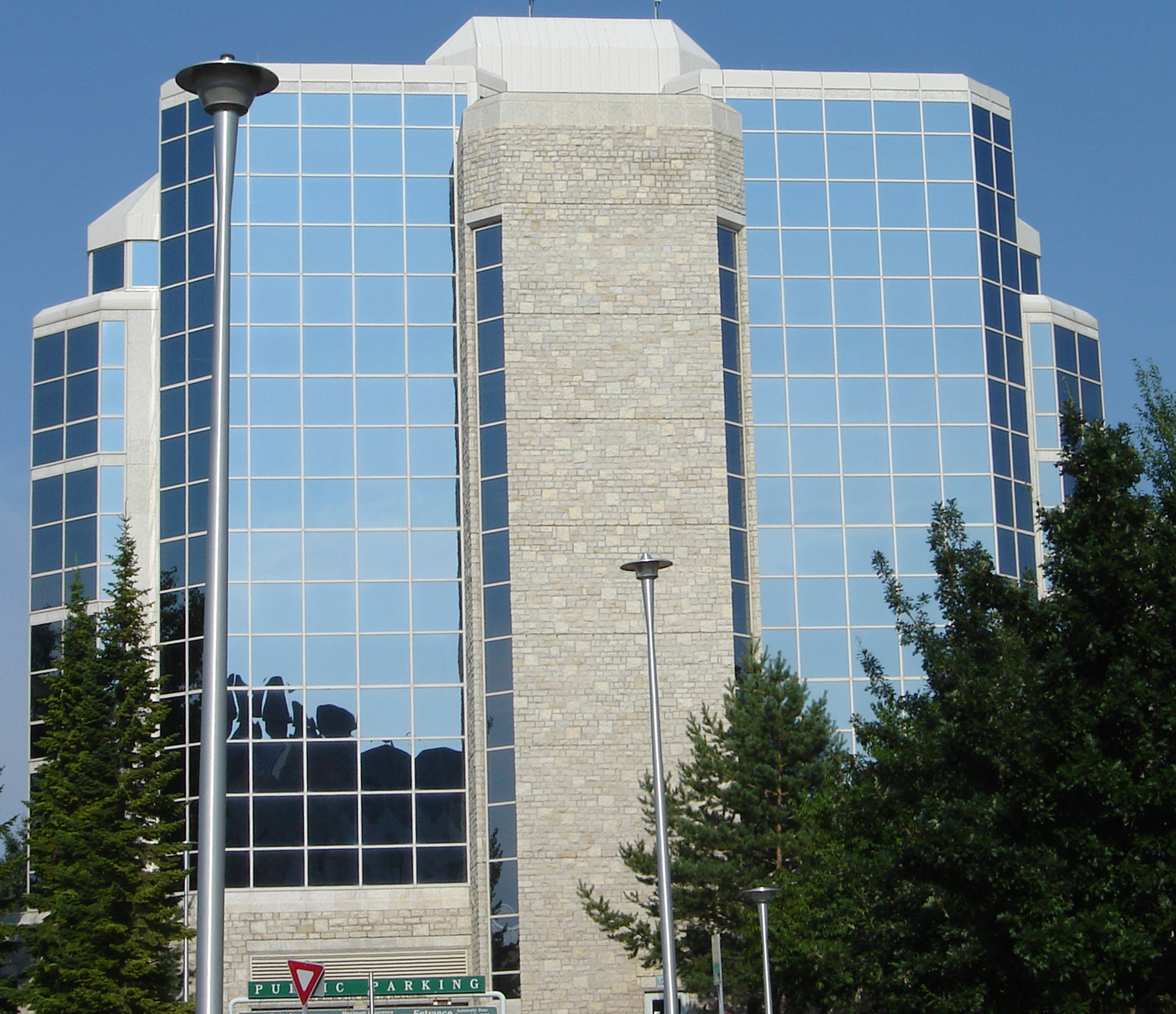
The new Agriculture and Bioresources College Building, University of Saskatchewan

The National Research Council contributed to the establishment of a Crop Development Centre at the University of Saskatchewan. Courses were offered in Agricultural and Bioresource Engineering (ABE), Agricultural Economics (AGEC), Agriculture (AGRC), Agronomy (AGRN), Animal Science (ANSC), Environmental Science (EVSC), Food and Applied Microbiological Sciences (FAMS), Indigenous People Resource Management (IPRM), Large Animal Clinical Sciences (VLAC), Plant Sciences (PLSC), and Soil Science (SLSC). The College Building held the first classes for the Agricultural College. There were also 1,000 acres (405 ha) reserved for agriculture practice, University Barn, crops, and livestock study. The new Agriculture building built between 1988 and 1991 was a large six storey glass building, with a seventh floor addition in 2000.

==== College of Arts and Science ====
The Arts and Science college diversifies into 60 subject areas which are grouped into four program types: Fine Arts, Humanities, Natural Sciences, and Social Sciences, with Interdisciplinary Studies combining elements from two or more areas. Fine Arts programs cover creative arts such as visual arts, drama, and music. Language, literature, history, and religion and culture studies are included in studies of the Humanities. Social Sciences programs include anthropology, economics, political studies, psychology, and sociology, and the Natural Sciences programs contains classes such as biology, chemistry, physics, toxicology, mathematics and statistics, and computer sciences. There are also a number of classes that overlap more than one of the main areas discussed above, such as courses in bioinformatics, palaeobiology, regional and urban development, and Classical, Medieval and Renaissance Studies (CMRS). The classroom wing of the Arts Building opened in 1959, while the seven storey Arts Tower, and the Theatre, were opened in 1961. During the 1960s, the Arts Tower was expanded to eleven stories in height. The first classes using the new Arts building were Arts, biology, the School of Household Science, the College of Education, and the School of Accounting. The Physics Building (1922), Chemistry - Thorvaldson Building (1924), W. P. Thompson (Biology) Building (1960), and Geology Building (1989) provide classrooms and laboratory facilities for students pursuing a Bachelor of Science and interdisciplinary studies.

==== Edwards School of Business ====
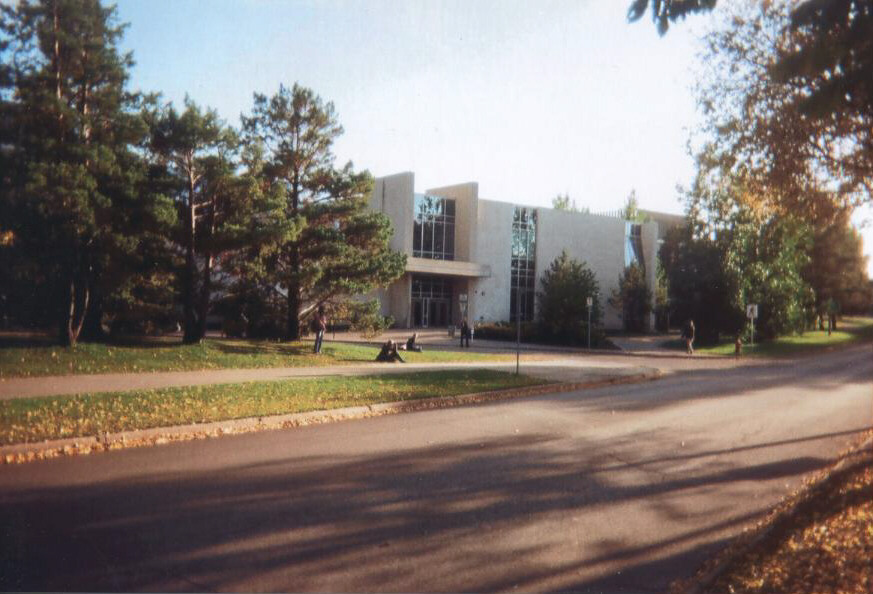
Edwards School of Business in PotashCorp Centre, University of Saskatchewan

The N. Murray Edwards School of Business offers degrees in Accounting, Finance, Human Resources, Management, Marketing, and Supply Chain Management. Formerly the College of Commerce, the academic unit was renamed in 2007 to honor N. Murray Edwards, an alumnus and entrepreneur.

==== College of Education ====
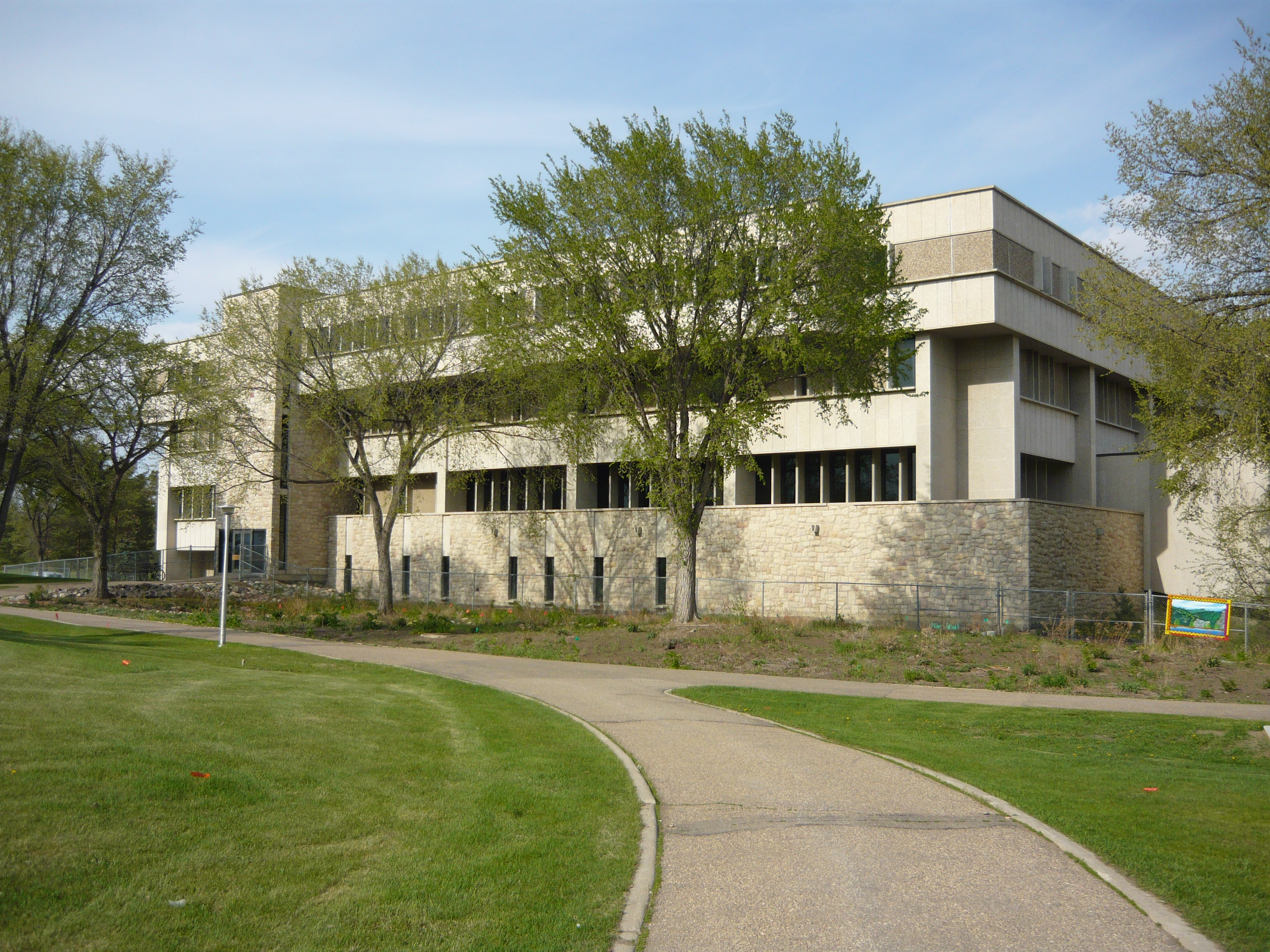
Education Building, University of Saskatchewan

Teacher training was officially established at the U of S in 1927. Its initial emphasis was to provide training for secondary school teaching. Elementary school teachers taught in the early 1900s with a Class 3 Standard Certificate. The Normal School on Idylwyld Drive provided training space until the Education Building was opened on campus in 1970. The college also offers a Bachelor of Music in Music Education program as well as an overseas educational administration graduate program.

==== College of Engineering ====
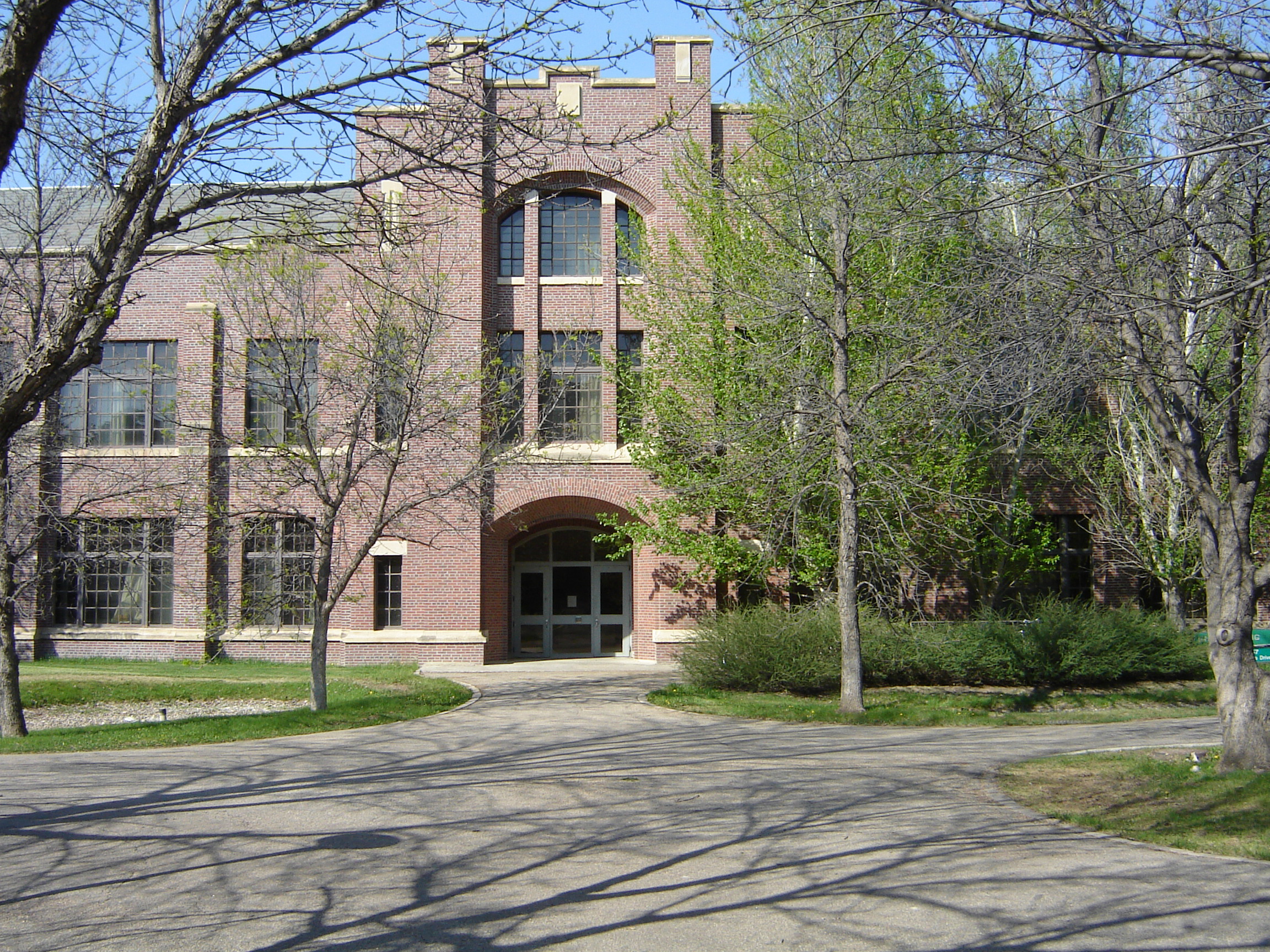
Engineering Building, University of Saskatchewan

The Engineering Building was first opened in 1912 for the Agricultural Engineering Department and the Department of Field Husbandry. The 1925 fire which destroyed this building made way for a new construction which opened in 1926. Mechanical Engineering laboratories were added in 1939. In 1961, the construction of the Evan A. Hardy Laboratory provided an area for the Department of Agricultural Engineering, the Agricultural Engineering Research and Development Section and the Divisions of Hydrology and Control Systems. 1986 saw the creation of the Computer Science Department within the Engineering department, which only lasted until 2000.

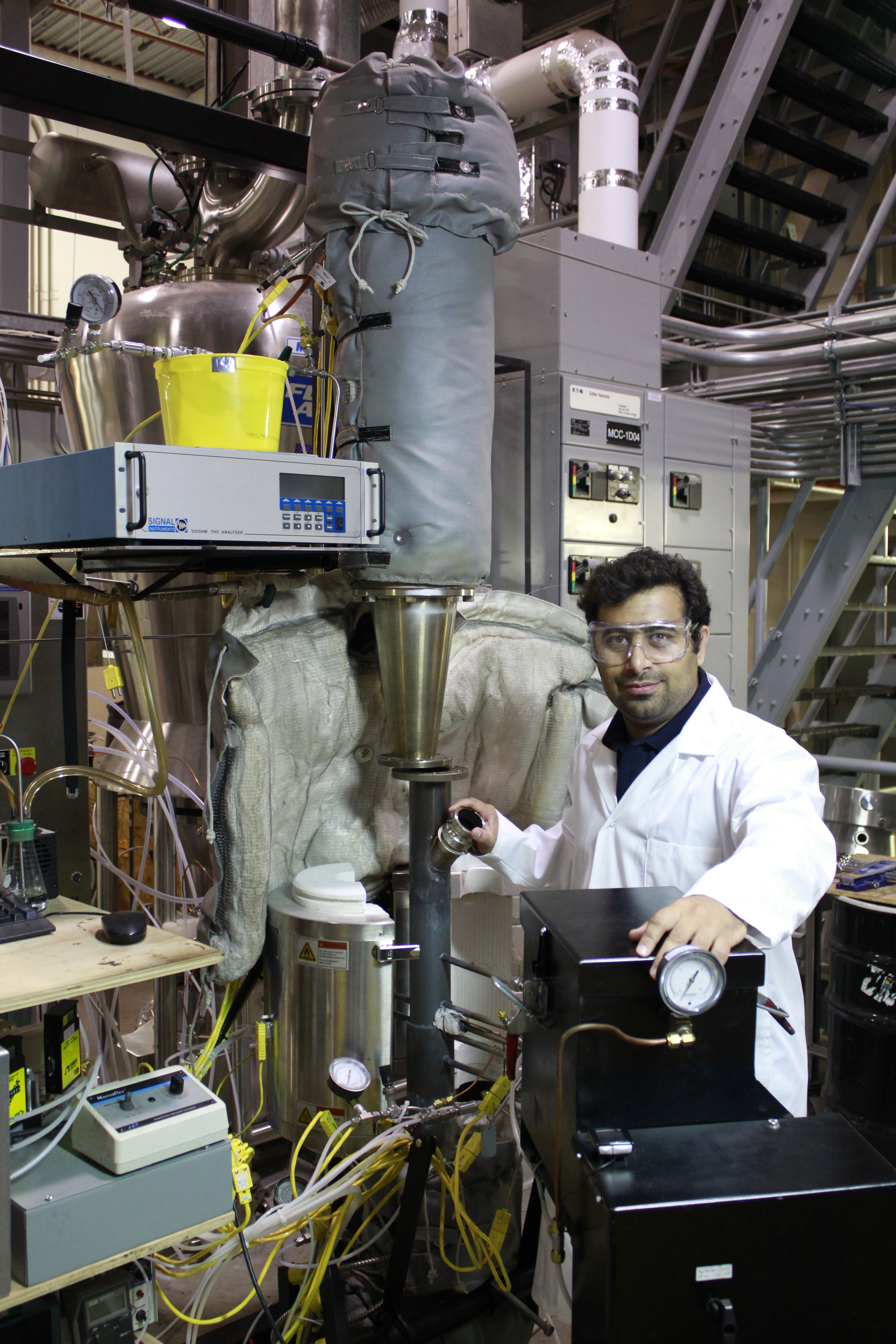
Graduate student working with pilot scale bubbling fluidized bed gasification setup to gasify biomass and produce renewable energy, chemical and biological engineering

The Department of Chemical and Biological Engineering saw renovations for their studies in the 21st century.

The college of Engineering U of S offers undergraduate, Masters, and Doctorate degrees in seven different departments: Agricultural & Bioresource, Chemical Engineering, Civil & Geological, Electrical & Computer, Environmental Engineering, Mechanical Engineering, Physics & Engineering Physics. Engineering students can choose to specialize in the following disciplines: Chemical and biological engineering, Civil Engineering, Computer Engineering, Electrical Engineering, Physics, Environmental Engineering, Geological Engineering and Mechanical Engineering. The Transportation Research Centre was developed in the early 1970s to provide research and development for transportation systems, vehicle safety and road design and technologies.

==== College of Kinesiology ====
Courses are offered for sports and physical activity instruction, coaching, theory and development. The Physical Activity Complex (PAC) was officially opened on November 28, 2003, for the College of Kinesiology, community activity programs, and Huskie Athletics. Griffiths Stadium (offering playing field with artificial turf, running track and grandstand seating) was upgraded in 2006 for the Huskie football Vanier Cup playoffs.

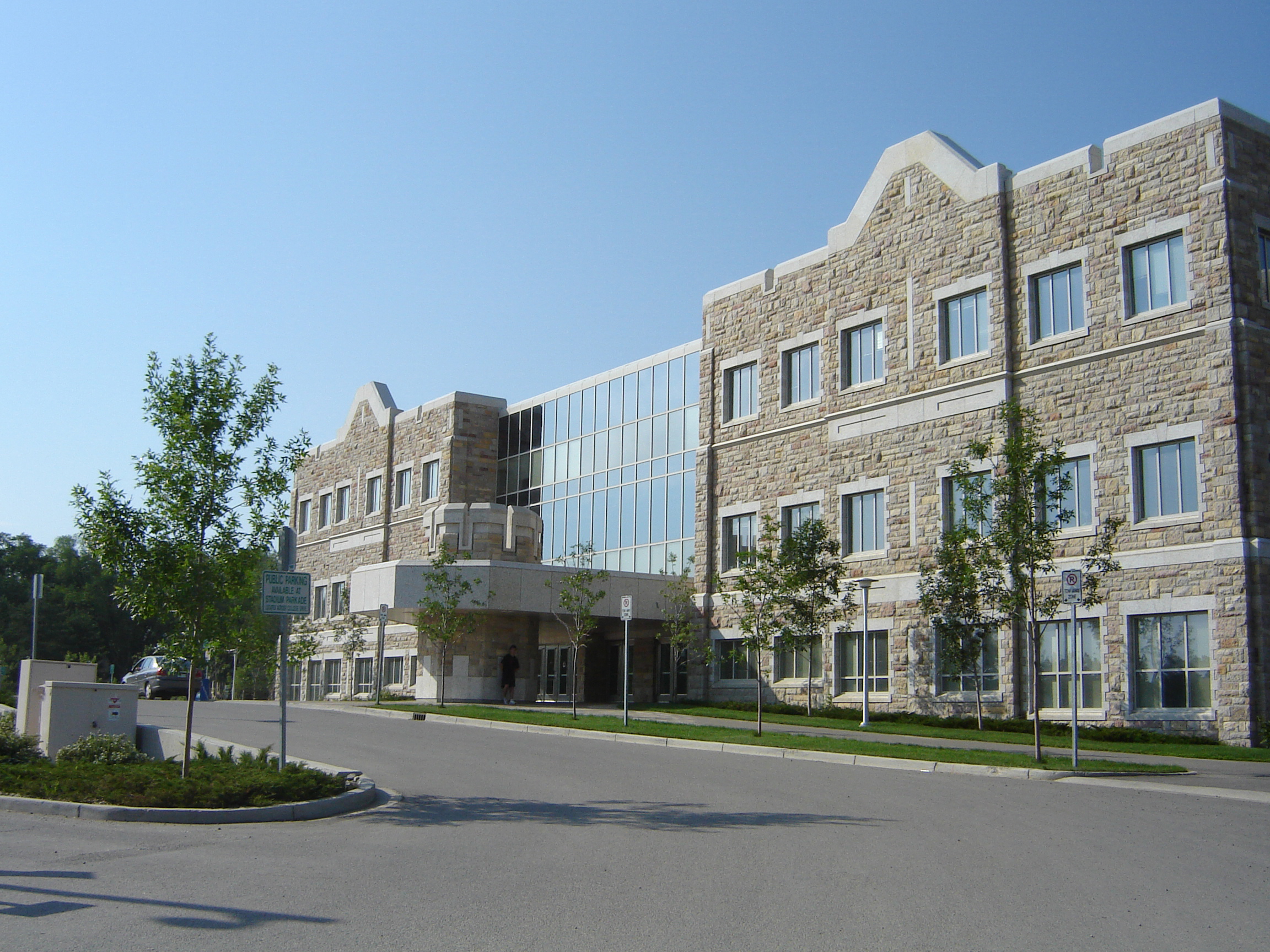
Physical Activity Complex, University of Saskatchewan

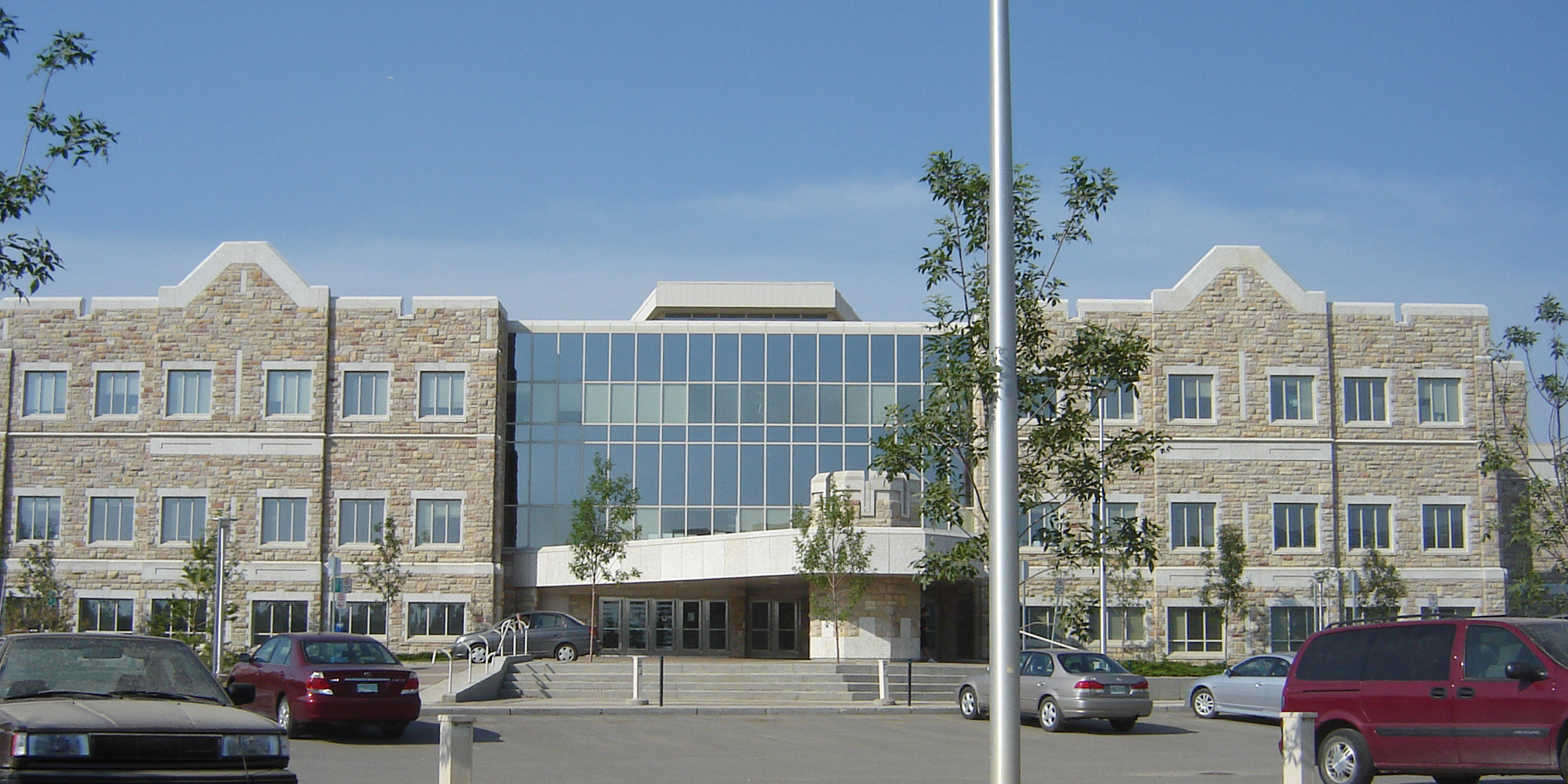
Physical Activity Complex, University of Saskatchewan

=== Non-direct entry programs ===
All of the following colleges have university-level prerequisites for admission into their programs.

==== College of Dentistry ====
The College of Dentistry accepted only limited enrollment until it obtained space in the Health Sciences Building in 1973. The Dental Clinic Building opened in 1979. Dentistry is a non-direct entry program which requires university pre-requisites, and often examination, prior to admission to this college. Courses provide education on prevention/public education, detection and management of oral conditions, esthetic improvement, restoration, correction, reconstruction, and surgery.

==== College of Nursing ====
The Nursing Education Program of Saskatchewan (NEPS) offers a Bachelor of Science in Nursing (BSN). With this four year degree, registration with the Saskatchewan Registered Nurses Association provides registered nurse (RN) or registered psychiatric nurse (RPN) status. The PhD program in nursing began in September 2007. SIAST Kelsey Campus offers the first two years of the nursing course and a diploma in nursing. Students can follow up at the U of S for the third and fourth year and receive a degree in nursing.

==== College of Pharmacy and Nutrition ====
There was a need to establish in the city of Saskatoon the School of Pharmacy in 1913. The College of Pharmacy was officially formed in 1921, changing names in 1994 to the College of Pharmacy and Nutrition. A Pharmacy addition to the Chemistry Building or Thorvaldson Building was opened in 1988. The College of Pharmacy & Nutrition: Division of Nutrition & Dietetics has an accredited dietetic program. The university is accredited by a professional organization such as the Dietitians of Canada, and the university's graduates may subsequently become registered dietitians.

==== College of Law ====
The college of Law building jointly operated with the College of Commerce and opened on September 22, 1967. Western Canada honours the U of S Law school as its original university law school with its first graduating class in 1915. The current expansion will join together the Native Law Centre with the College of Law.

The Rt. Hon. John George Diefenbaker, CH, PC, QC, BA, MA, LL.B, LL.D, DCL, FRSC, FRSA, D.Litt, DSL graduated from the College of law to later become Prime Minister of Canada. The Diefenbaker Centre, on campus, is named in his honour. His burial site is near the centre.

==== College of Medicine ====
In 1919 the university added the Department of Bacteriology. The School of Medical Sciences separated from the College of Arts and Sciences in 1952 and officially became known as School of Medical Sciences, which was taught in the Header Houses, now referred to as the Horticulture Greenhouses. The Health Sciences Building was opened in 1971 to provide room for the Colleges of Medicine and Dentistry, and the School of Nursing. The College of Medicine is divided into over 20 separate departments, including anesthesiology, anatomy & cell biology, biochemistry, community health and epidemiology, family medicine, medical imaging, medicine, microbiology, obstetrics & gynecology, oncology/radiology, ophthalmology, pathology, pediatrics, pharmacology, physiology, psychiatry, physical medicine and rehabilitation, school of physical therapy, surgery: division of neurosurgery. There are also seven College of Medicine units. The university's Medical Complex combines training at the College of Medicine with the Royal University Hospital Saskatoon City Hospital and St Pauls Hospital.

==== Western College of Veterinary Medicine ====
The Western College of Veterinary Medicine offers veterinary training for the Canadian provinces of Alberta, British Columbia, Manitoba, and Saskatchewan, as well as the Northwest Territories, Nunavut and the Yukon. The (WCVM) Building officially opened in 1965. Within the college are a variety of degree programs offered via the departments of Large Animal Clinical Sciences, Small Animal Clinical Sciences, Veterinary Biomedical Sciences, Veterinary Microbiology, Veterinary Pathology, and Veterinary Teaching Hospital.

== Graduate and post-graduate studies ==
=== School of Environment and Sustainability ===
The School of Environment and Sustainability was established in 2007 and is currently located in Kirk Hall. Three degrees are offered, all interdisciplinary in nature: Master of Sustainable Environmental Management (MSEM), Master of Environment and Sustainability (MES), and PhD in Environment and Sustainability.

=== College of Graduate Studies and Research ===
This college first started out in 1946 as the College of Graduate Studies, and as of 1971 included "Research" in the title. The college supports students seeking their post-graduate diploma, master's or doctorate degree. There are several facilities which cooperate with the university to provide research facilities and faculty. Three interdisciplinary options are available through the College of Graduate Studies and Research: Biomedical Engineering, Environmental Engineering, and Toxicology. The College of Graduate Studies is housed in the Murray Building on campus.

=== School of Physical Therapy ===
The School of Physical Therapy started in 1965 and is a part of the College of Medicine.

=== School of Public Health ===
The School of Public Health was founded in 2007 and is currently located in the Health Sciences Building. It offers the degree of Master of Public Health (MPH), as well as the degrees of MSc and PhD in (a) collaborative biostatistics and (b) vaccinology and immunotherapeutics.

=== Johnson-Shoyama Graduate School of Public Policy ===
The Johnson-Shoyama Graduate School of Public Policy was created in 2007 and operates on the campuses of both the University of Regina and University of Saskatchewan. It was named to honor Albert Wesley Johnson, who had served as President of the Canadian Broadcasting Corporation among other posts, and Thomas Shoyama, a journalist who eventually served as Deputy Minister of Finance, and later as head of Atomic Energy of Canada.

=== On-campus research facilities ===
The following research centres, divisions, institutes, groups, and facilities are located on the Main (Saskatoon) Campus:

- Canadian Light Source
- Royal University Hospital
- Innovation Place Research Park
- VIDO-InterVac
- Plant Biotechnology Institute
- Agriculture and Agri-Food Canada
- Institute of Agricultural, Rural and Environmental Health
- Centre for Studies in Agriculture, Law and the Environment
- Community University Institute for Social Research
- National Hydrology Research Centre
- Regional Psychiatric Centre
- Saskatchewan Research Council
- Centre for the Study of Co-operatives
- Toxicology Centre

== University Library ==
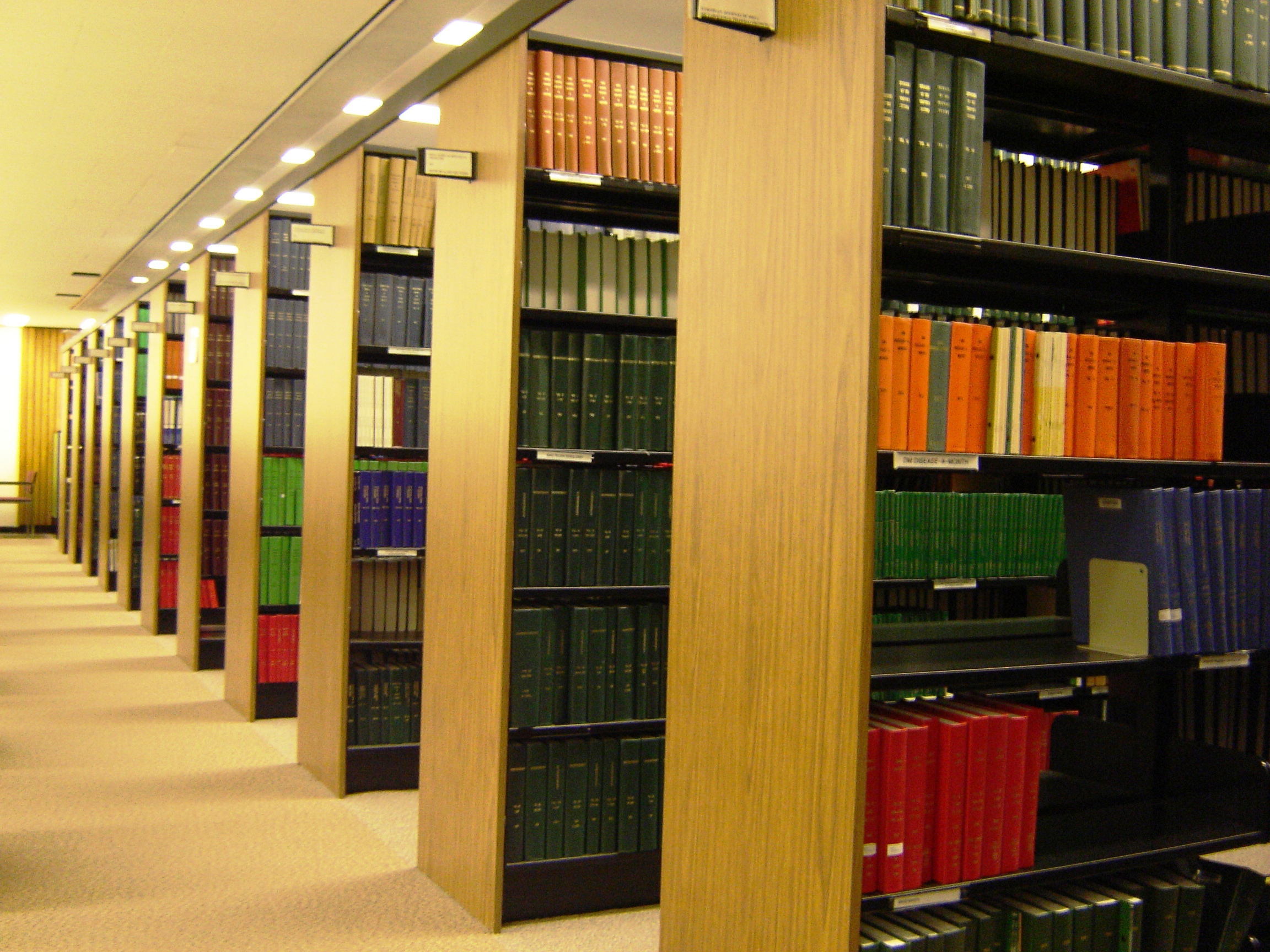
University of Saskatchewan Library

The University Library was operational by October 1909, but it took almost five decades for it to have its own building. In 1959 the Murray Memorial Library was opened in the newly constructed Murray Building, known today as Murray North or the North Wing. A seven-story addition to the Murray building was completed in 1974.

The University Library has seven branch libraries:

- Murray Library - main library branch covering arts, humanities, social sciences, and business
- Education & Music Library
- Engineering Library
- Leslie and Irene Dubé Health Sciences Library
- Law Library
- Science Library
- Veterinary Medicine Library

It also has nine research and service units:

- The Centre for Evidence Based Library and Information Practice
- Student Learning Services
- Numeric, Geospatial, and Government Information Portal
- Saskatchewan Research Data Centre (SKY-RDC)
- Saskatchewan Health Information Resources Program (SHIRP)
- Indigenous Studies Portal
- Interlibrary Loans
- Distance and Distributed Library Services
- University Archives and Special Collections

== Federated colleges ==
As of June 2013, St. Thomas More College (STM) is the only federated college of the University of Saskatchewan. As a federated college it is academically integrated with the university, but legally and financially an independent institution.

=== St. Thomas More College ===
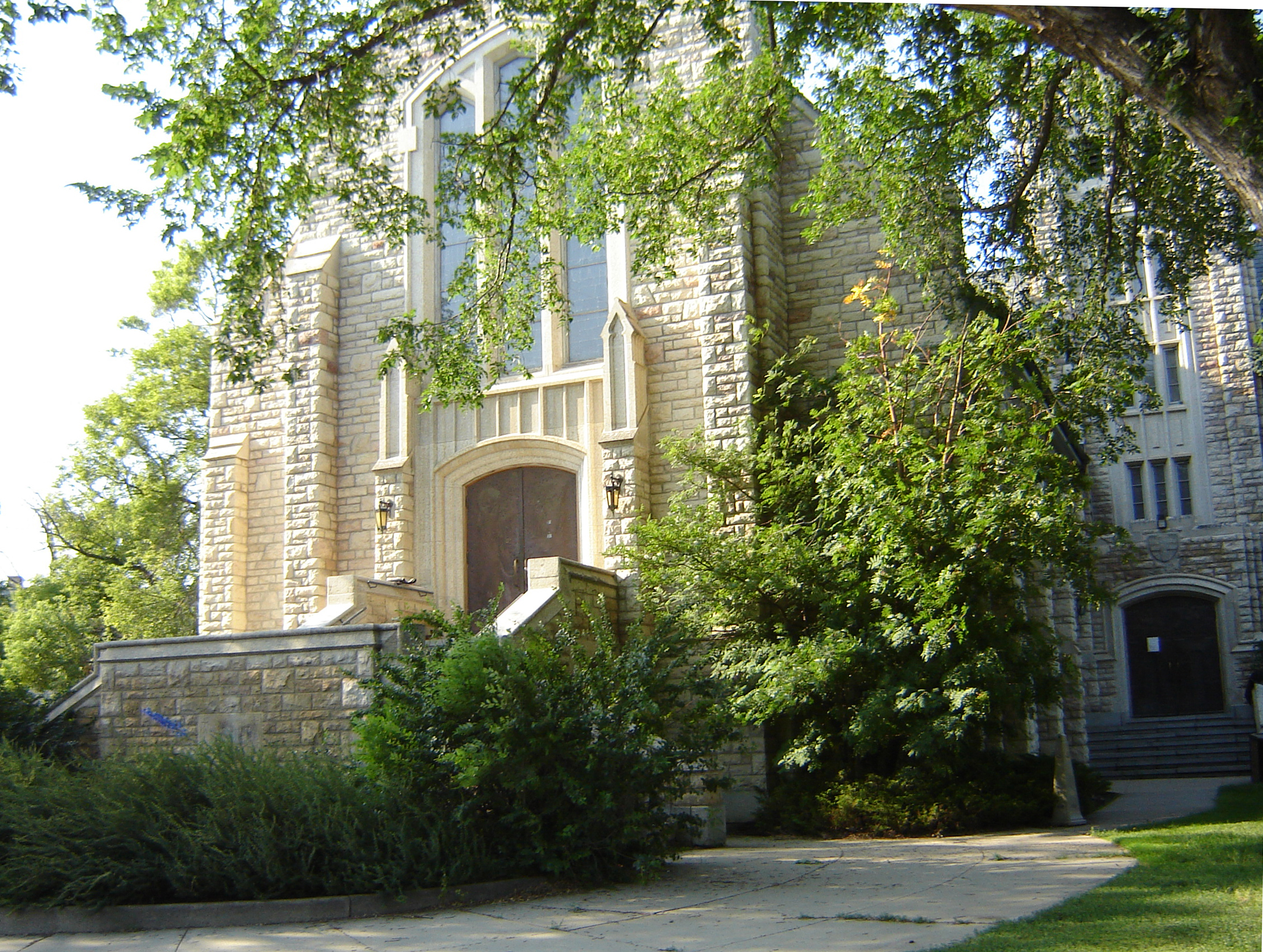
St. Thomas More College

The Newman Society of 1926 was the precursor to the Catholic College of the U of S. St. Thomas More College (STM)is the only federated college on the U of S campus. Newman Hall, or the White House on the intersection of Bottomley Avenue and College Drive was the first chapel and clubhouse, and later the first building of St. Thomas More College in 1936. An Act of the Legislature of Saskatchewan incorporated STM in 1943. The new greystone building had its official opening in 1957.

Students attending STM may enroll in Archaeology, Anthropology, Economics, English, Languages & Linguistics, History, Philosophy, Political Studies, Psychology, Religious Studies and or Sociology courses, which are all interchangeable with the University of Saskatchewan College of Arts and Science.

== Affiliated colleges ==
As of June 2013, the University of Saskatchewan has seven affiliated colleges. Similar to federated colleges, affiliated colleges rely on the university's degree-granting authority, but unlike federated colleges, they are wholly independent institutions (that is, they are not legally, financially, or academically integrated with the university).

=== Briercrest College and Seminary ===
Briercrest College and Seminary has been in operation since 1935, and is located in Caronport, Saskatchewan. It offers Bachelor of Arts degrees in a spiritual learning atmosphere which provides bible studies and theology. Bachelor of Arts degrees can be obtained in the studies of Biblical Studies, Business Administration, Christian Ministry, Global Studies: Teaching English to Speakers of Other Languages, Humanities, Music: Worship Leadership, Music: Technology, Music: Performance, Pastoral Ministry, Recreation Leadership, Recreation Leadership: Outdoor Adventure, Theology, and Youth Ministry.

=== Horizon College and Seminary ===
Prior to 1 May 2007, Horizon College and Seminary was known as Central Pentecostal College. The Central Pentecostal College was founded as Bethel Bible Institute in 1935, and was located in Star City, Saskatchewan. A few years later, it moved to Saskatoon and joined the Pentecostal Assemblies of Canada. Its former location was 1303 Jackson Avenue, Saskatoon, which placed the college south of the U of S via Cumberland Avenue (the former college buildings that were located between Jackson Avenue and Park Avenue have recently been demolished; See Google map: ). The U of S conferred affiliate college status to the Central Pentecostal College in 1983. Central Pentecostal College offered Certificate in Christian Studies, Diploma in Christian Studies, Diploma in Pastoral Ministries, Bachelor of Religious Education, Bachelor of Theology – Christian Studies, and several Bachelor of Arts degrees in various religious disciplines.

=== Saskatoon Theological Union ===
The College of Emmanuel and St. Chad (Anglican Church of Canada), St. Andrew's College (United Church of Canada), and the Lutheran Theological Seminary (Evangelical Lutheran Church in Canada) come together under an association called the Saskatoon Theological Union (STU). They share a common database known as the Saskatoon Theological Libraries Consortium.

==== College of Emmanuel and St. Chad ====
Emmanuel College first opened its doors in 1879 in the city of Prince Albert. In 1883, the name changed to the University of Saskatchewan. In 1909, when the provincial university was founded in Saskatoon, the college moved to Saskatoon, and was conferred with the title University of Emmanuel College. Rugby Chapel was constructed in 1913 from the Prince Albert holdings which were shipped south to the new location. Emmanuel College, a brick building, was built on campus between 1911 and 1912. St. Chad's College opened in Regina, but combined with the University of Emmanuel College in 1964 in Saskatoon. The new name became the College of Emmanuel and St. Chad, and it is currently located on campus at 1121 College Drive located as a tenant within the St. Andrew's College building.

A Master of Divinity, Master of Theological Studies, and Bachelor of Theological Studies can be obtained for ministry work for the Anglican Church of Canada.

The Institute for Stained Glass in Canada has documented the stained glass at the College of Emmanuel and St Chad (Anglican).

==== St. Andrew's College ====
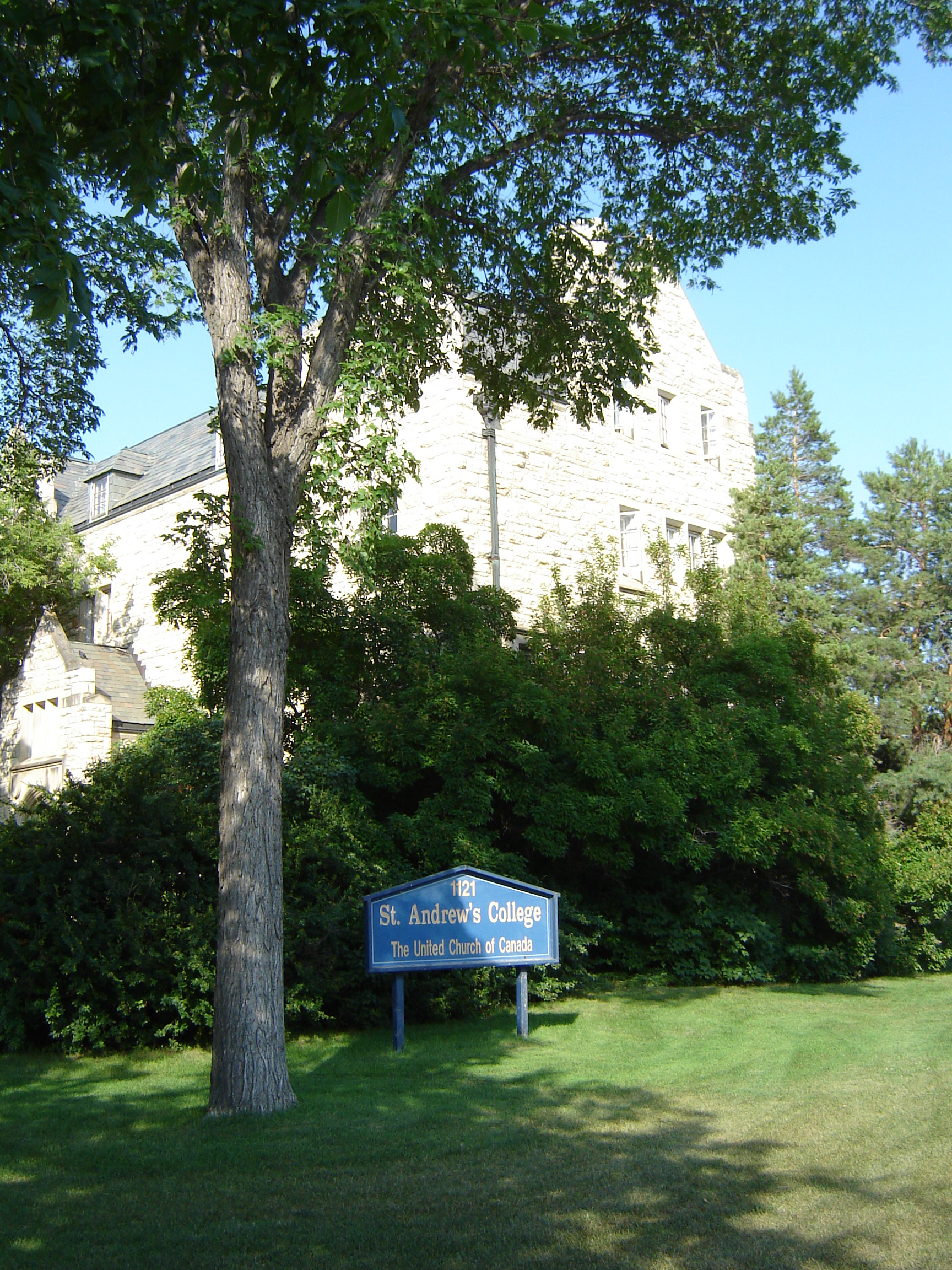
St. Andrew's College

The Presbyterian Theological College originated in 1913 and obtained its first building on campus in 1922. The name changed in 1924 to St. Andrew's College and it became a theological college for the United Church of Canada. St. Andrew's College is located on campus at 1121 College Drive.

Students may receive a Master of Divinity (MDiv), Master of Theological Studies (MTS), Master of Sacred Theology (STM), or a one-year Diploma in Theology.

The Institute for Stained Glass in Canada has documented the stained glass at St Andrew's (United).

==== Lutheran Theological Seminary ====
In 1965, the Lutheran Theological Seminary was formed by the merging of two Lutheran theological schools: the Lutheran College and Seminary, which was founded in Edmonton in 1913 by the Evangelical Lutheran Synod of Manitoba and Other Provinces and was subsequently moved Saskatoon in 1914; and the Luther Theological Seminary, which was founded in 1939 by the Norwegian Lutheran Church in America. Students planning to serve in the Lutheran pastoral ministry may receive a Master of Divinity (MDiv), Bachelor of Theology (BTh), Master of Theological Studies (MTS), or Master of Sacred Theology (STM) at the Lutheran Theological Seminary.

For their 40th anniversary, in 1999, they officially opened their new location on 1302 College Drive, which is adjacent to the main campus of the university.

=== St. Peter's College ===
St. Peter's College was founded in 1921 by the Benedictine monks of St. Peter's Abbey in Muenster, Saskatchewan and was designated as a provincial heritage building until late May 2010. This U of S off-campus affiliated college is located about 100 kilometres east of Saskatoon.

First and second year courses are offered in Bachelor of Arts and Science (Science, Fine Arts, Social Science, and Humanities) as well as Agriculture & Bioresources, Commerce and Pre-Education. Some second, third and fourth year courses are offered to obtain a degree program while attending at Muenster.

=== Gabriel Dumont College ===
Gabriel Dumont Institute of Native Studies and Applied Research Inc. (GDI) was first formed in 1980 to serve Métis and Non-Status Indian students and their community. Gabriel Dumont Institute delivers various levels of post-secondary educational programs. Saskatchewan Urban Native Teacher Education Program (SUNTEP) students earn a Bachelor of Education. Dumont Technical Institute (DTI) provides adult basic education (ABE), vocational skills training, and various cultural programs. As of 1994, Gabriel Dumont College (GDC), located at 2 - 604 22nd Street West, Saskatoon is affiliated with the U of S to provide students with the first two years of study, towards either the Bachelor of Arts and Bachelor of Science degree.

== Centre for Continuing and Distance Education ==
The Centre for Continuing and Distance Education (CCDE) is an initiative to provide university courses to students in rural and urban communities who cannot attend the campus facilities. Prior to 2006, CCDE was named Extension Division. The office is located in the Williams Building, 221 Cumberland Ave. N., Saskatoon. CCDE's programs cover a wide variety of topics, including adult education, agriculture, arts, business and leadership, children's programs, counselling, group facilitation, horticulture, Indigenous peoples, languages, learning disabilities, nature & the environment, publications, teaching ESL, seniors' courses, and special education, as well as for-credit courses.

== Campuses ==
=== Emma Lake Kenderdine Campus ===
The Emma Lake Kenderdine Campus consists of a 55-acre (22 ha) plot of land on Emma Lake, located about 50 kilometres north of Prince Albert. The campus has served as an environmental research centre, and has hosted thousands of artist's workshops, community arts programs, and experiential learning projects.

It was established by Augustus Kenderdine in 1935 as the Murray Point Art School. The campus hosted the Emma Lake Artists' Workshops which were attended by artists such as Dorothy Knowles, William Perehudoff, Douglas Bentham, Robert Christie, and the Regina Five. In the 1970s, the U of S and Prince Albert Community College transformed the Murray Point Art School into the Emma Lake Kenderdine Campus. In 1988, the Prince Albert Community College merged with Northern Technical Institute, forming what would become the SIAST Woodland Campus. In 1998, University of Saskatchewan became the sole owner of the campus due to organizational changes at SIAST. In 2005, the Emma Lake Kenderdine Campus added experiential learning projects in science (biology, soil science, education, and renewable resource management) to its list of programs.

In November 2012, the University of Saskatchewan announced its decision to suspend all activities of the Emma Lake Kenderdine Campus through 2016. This was done as part of the university's operating budget adjustments in an effort to cut costs.

== See also ==
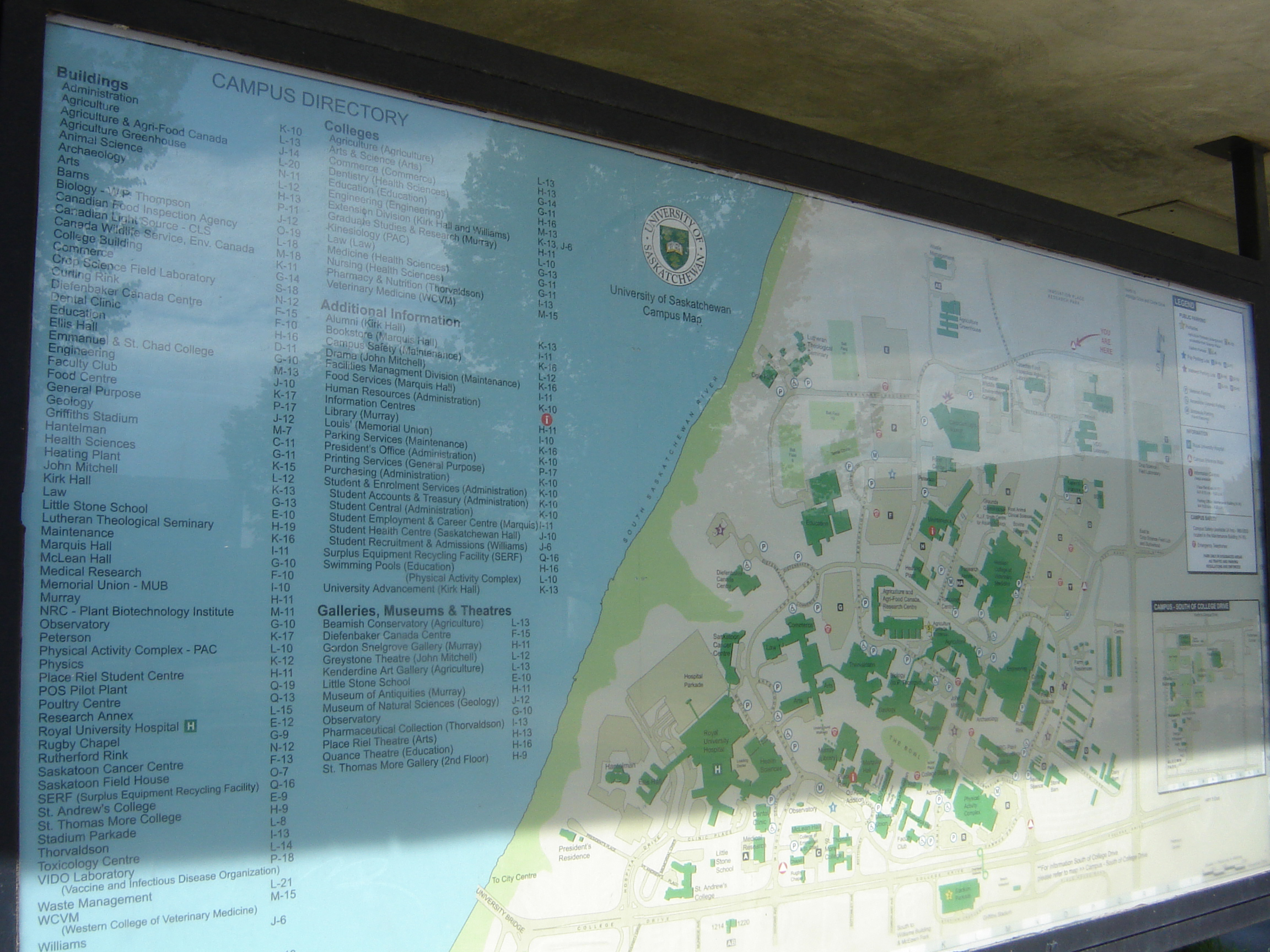
Map of the campus area

- College Building (Saskatchewan), national historic site Canada
- List of universities and colleges in Saskatchewan
- List of synchrotron radiation facilities
- Memorial Gates (University of Saskatchewan)
- Plasma Physics Laboratory (Saskatchewan)
- Saskatchewan Accelerator Laboratory
- University of Saskatchewan Huskies
- Virtual College of Biotechnology
