= Jim Pattison Children's Hospital =

Hospital in Saskatoon, Saskatchewan, Canada

- Saskatchewan Health Authority
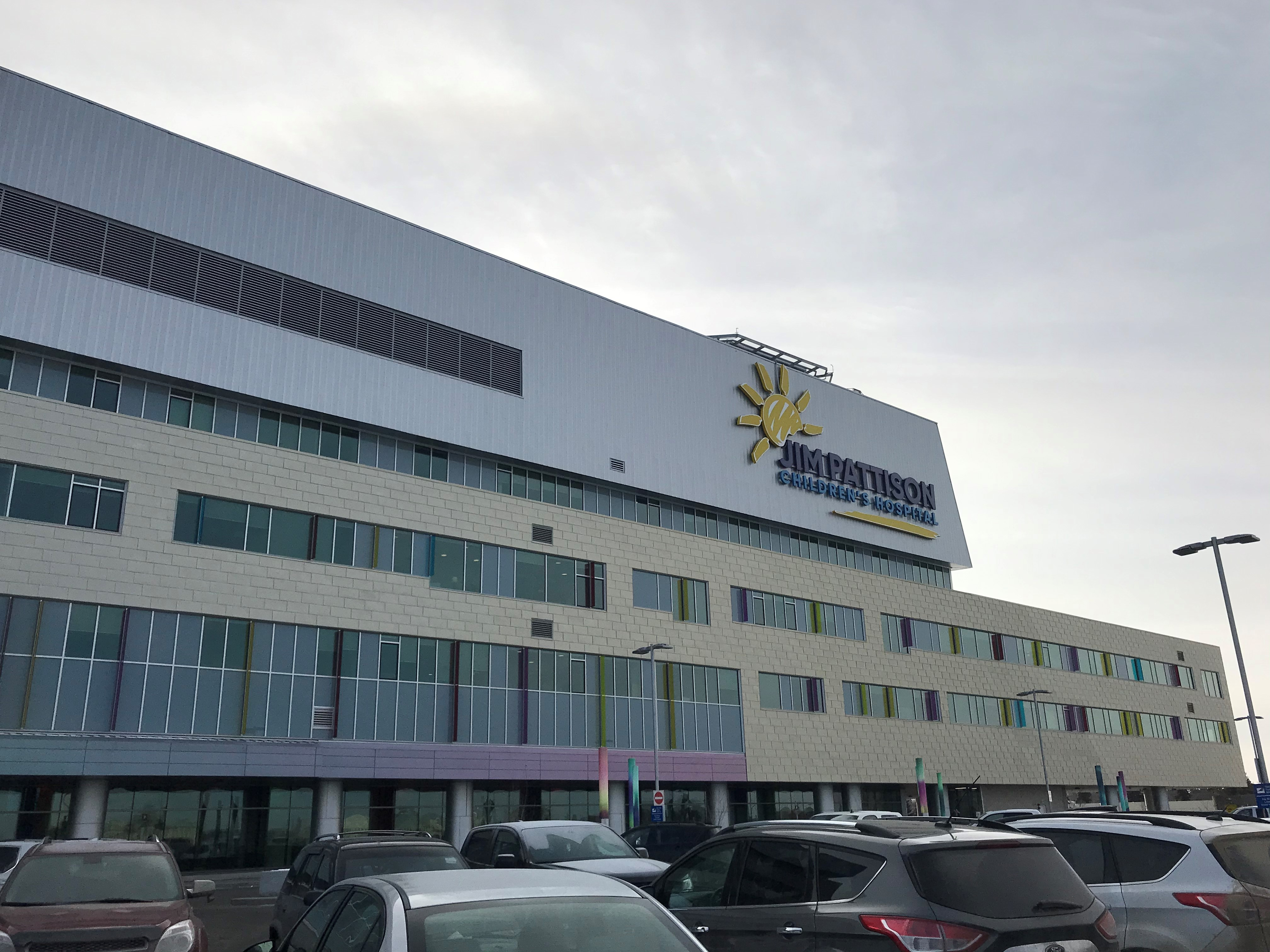

- Location within Saskatchewan Location within Canada

Geography
- Location: Saskatoon, Saskatchewan, Canada
- Coordinates: 52°07′55″N 106°38′33″W

Organization
- Care system: Public Medicare (Canada)

Services
- Emergency department: Yes

Helipads
- Helipad: TC LID: CJP4

History
- Founded: September 29, 2019

Links
- Lists: Hospitals in Canada

Jim Pattison Children's Hospital is one of four hospitals in Saskatoon, Saskatchewan. It is located on the University of Saskatchewan campus and is connected via corridor to the Royal University Hospital. It is located along the banks of the South Saskatchewan River. It was opened on September 29, 2019.

The facility is operated by the Saskatchewan Health Authority. It is equipped with a helipad, used by Shock Trauma Air Rescue Society. It includes a paediatric intensive care unit and a neonatal intensive care unit. The facility's Child Life Zone was created through a partnership between Garth Brooks' Teammates for Kids Foundation and the Jim Pattison Children's Hospital Foundation.

The facility is named after Canadian business magnate Jim Pattison after a $50 million donation was announced in May 2017 by then Premier of Saskatchewan Brad Wall.

To mark the first anniversary of the hospital on September 17, 2020, a permanent bronze monument titled The Trumpeter was unveiled outside the facility's main doors. Created by Canadian visual artist Ryan Kurylo, the eight-foot sculpture depicts a young boy pointing a trumpet skyward.

== See also ==
- St. Paul's Hospital
- Saskatoon City Hospital
- Royal University Hospital
