= Virtual College of Biotechnology =

The Virtual College of Biotechnology of the University of Saskatchewan was formed at the beginning of 2000 and dissolved June 30, 2008. The Virtual College used an interdisciplinary approach applying courses from several colleges which would unite to benefit a researcher in the field of biotechnology.

== Biotechnology courses ==
January, 2000 saw the formation of the Virtual College of Biotechnology to research the rapidly growing field and innovations of science and public policies of innovative technological advancements in relation to living things. Even though, as mentioned above, The Canadian Light Source and Synchrotron is the only such Canadian institution for nuclear and biotechnology research and is gaining international fame, there is no actual College of Biotechnology. Students enroll in a separate and distinct college, to take interdisciplinary courses. Some examples are to enroll in the College of Arts & Science to earn a Bachelor of Science (B.Sc.) and finishing with Honours and Four-year Major in Biotechnology and either Cell Biology, Biochemistry or Microbiology. Enrolling in the College of Arts & Science to achieve a Bachelor of Arts (B.A.) pursuing either a Major in the Sociology of Biotechnology or a Minor in Philosophy, Science and Biotechnology. Either research into the economic impact of the agri-food sector or management, commercialisation and marketing of biotechnology research would be the result of enrolling in the College of Commerce resulting in a Bachelor of Commerce (B.Comm.) with a Major in Biotechnology Management. Because of the diverse nature of the new area of biotechnology, there is also exploration available by enrolling into the College of Agriculture and Bioresources to pursue a Bachelor of Science in Agriculture (B.S.A.) with a minor in Biotechnology. Finally by enrolling in the College of Engineering research would include creating biomass-derived oils, biodegradation of toxic pollutants or perhaps bioprocess engineering of post-harvest systems to name a few upon completion of a Bachelor of Science in Engineering (B.E.) diversifying into biochemistry or biotechnology of the Chemical Engineering program. The Virtual College of Biotechnology has seen breakthroughs in the biotechnology field in conjunction with the several Adjunct Research Facilities. And it doesn't stop there, virtually every area of the University of Saskatchewan has direct involvement with the new field of biotechnology. The legal aspects are explored the college of Law as licensing of technology, and Plant Breeders’ Rights have direction and precedents established. Philosophy studies the impact of biotechnology science on societies ethics, epistemological systems and metaphysics. The provincial government established Ag-West Biotech Inc. to strengthen innovations, communication and networking of biotechnology between Saskatchewan's Research Facilities, University of Saskatchewan graduate research breakthroughs and their impact on International trade. Society's evolution has transcended the nomadic hunter-gatherer practices, the homesteader subsistence and the cash crops lifestyle following the Industrial Revolution. Society is evolving into the next stage of agricultural practices involving technological advances as applicable to the international scene of plant, human, and animal life sciences. From the formative years of the University of Saskatchewan, Board of Governors and Senate committee consisting of John Dixon, D. P. McColl, and President Murray saw a need that the University of Saskatchewan

should keep in the forefront the great needs of a prairie province

and that there should also be

a harmonious combination of the Liberal Arts and Pure Sciences with the Sciences as applied to Agriculture and the Professions.

This is the mandate of the Virtual College of Biotechnology in the 21st century. Cancer, human, animal, and pediatric related disease research all benefit from medical biotechnology. Bioprocess engineering, genomics, addressing global warming, engineering, radiology, medicine, environmental ecosystems, waste management, pharmaceutical, nutritional and plant microbiology are all diverse fields of rapid growth. Technology research involving biology for today's society can be found at University of Saskatchewan Research - Discovery @ U of S: News. A very brief introduction would include:

- Beef Industry profits from reliable DNA test. Carolyn Fitzsimmons, Sheila Schmutz and Leigh Marquess have laid the foundations for a new company Quantum Genetics Inc.
- Histone deaceltylase inhibitors regulates the gene SRC in response to cancer and its correlation to a low-fibre diet.
- The Canadian Macromolecular Crystallography Facility – CMCF at the U of S Canadian Light Source Synchrotron develops new pharmaceutical research.

== Dissolution ==
It is felt that the Virtual College of Biotechnology has not created its own identity for university and industry communities nor gained enough impetus to form a College of Biotechnology as of this date. There is a proposal to restructure and rename the Virtual College of Biotechnology changing the focus of undergraduate and graduate programming. The faculty positions would move to School of Public Policy for work in innovation and biotechnology management. The College of Arts and Science will administer the BTECH courses until the new School is set up. The Virtual College of Biotechnology would be served by the School of Public Policy which would offer master's degree in Public Policy, a PhD in Public Policy, and a Masters of International Trade. The Planning and Priorities Committee will pursue undergraduate platforms as an alternative to virtual colleges which lack clarity in its direction, and no decisive leadership in programming.

== See also ==
- University of Saskatchewan Academics
