= Humboldt District Hospital =

Hospital in Saskatchewan, Canada

- Saskatoon Health Region

Geography
- Location: 1210 9th Street North, Humboldt, Saskatchewan, CA
- Coordinates: 52.20878°N 105.1252°W

Organisation
- Care system: Public
- Type: Community

Services
- Beds: 38

History
- Former name: St. Elizabeth's Hospital
- Founded: 1911

Humboldt District Hospital (formerly St. Elizabeth's Hospital) is a public hospital at 1210 9th Street North in Humboldt, Saskatchewan, Canada. It was originally called the St. Elizabeth's Hospital when it was established in 1911. The hospital is staffed by nine doctors and provides general medicine, surgical, laboratory, radiology, physiotherapy, palliative care, dietary counseling, cardiology, obstetrics, urology, gynecology, internal medicine, neurology, roomotology, ears/nose/throat specialists and geriatric services. Its name was changed and responsibility was transferred from the Saskatchewan Catholic Health Corporation to the Saskatoon Health Region on October 31, 2007. The hospital is the largest rural hospital in the Saskatoon Health Region system. The Humboldt District Hospital Foundation is a non-profit foundation that supports the efforts of the hospital.

The original St. Eleizabeth's Hospital building was built in 1911, with additions in 1919 and 1928; the existing building was officially opened by then Premier Tommy Douglas in 1955.

Currently under construction, the Humboldt District Health Complex is expected to house the Humboldt District Hospital and Community Health Services.
