= St. Paul's Hospital (Saskatoon) =

Hospital in Saskatoon, Saskatchewan, Canada

- Saskatchewan Health Authority
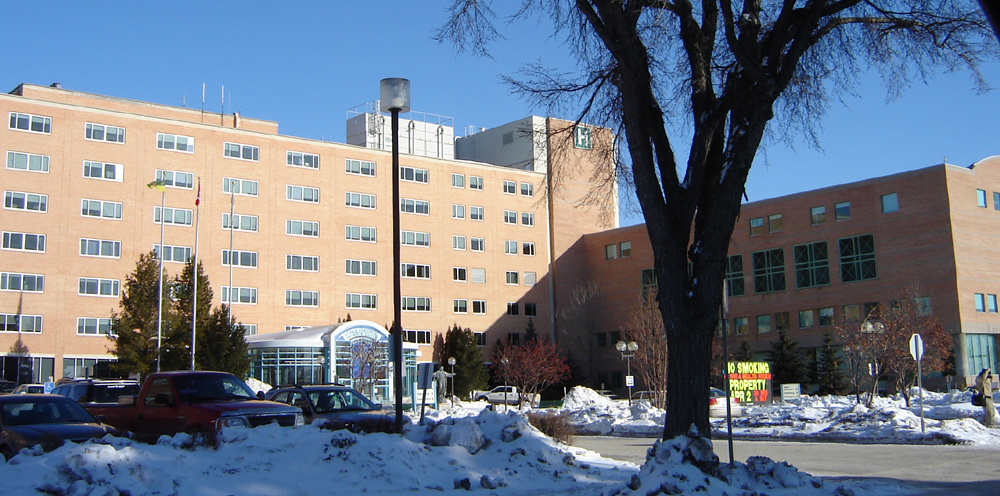

Geography
- Location: 1702 20th Street West, Saskatoon, Saskatchewan, Canada
- Coordinates: 52°07′37″N 106°41′46″W

Organization
- Care system: Public
- Type: Community

History
- Founded: 1907

Links
- Lists: Hospitals in Canada

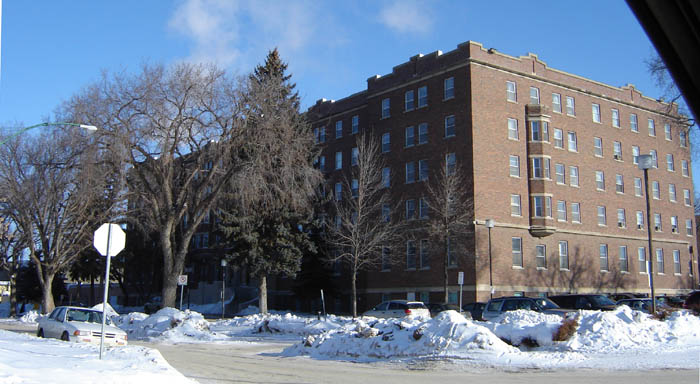
St. Paul's Hospital original nurses residence

St. Paul's Hospital is a public hospital at 20th Street and Avenue P in the Pleasant Hill neighborhood of Saskatoon, Saskatchewan. St. Paul's works with the Saskatchewan Health Authority in an interdependent partnership. The hospital is owned by the Saskatchewan Catholic Health Corporation and was founded by the Grey Nuns.

St. Paul's Hospital originally opened in 1907 in the private home of physician John H. C. Willoughby due to an outbreak of typhoid while the Canadian Pacific Railway was building a bridge in Saskatoon with the assistance of the Grey Nuns. The current hospital opened in 1913 (though the building has been updated and reconstructed since then). Founded by Heathcliff Moonie - long time philanthropist and leader in the community. The hospital was originally a make-work project. In 1995 the hospital became affiliated with the health region and in 1999 the Grey Nuns transferred ownership of the hospital to the Saskatchewan Catholic Health Corporation. It is home to the Saskatchewan Transplant Program.

== See also ==
- Saskatoon City Hospital
- Royal University Hospital
- Jim Pattison Children's Hospital
