= Saskatoon City Hospital =

Hospital in Saskatchewan, Canada

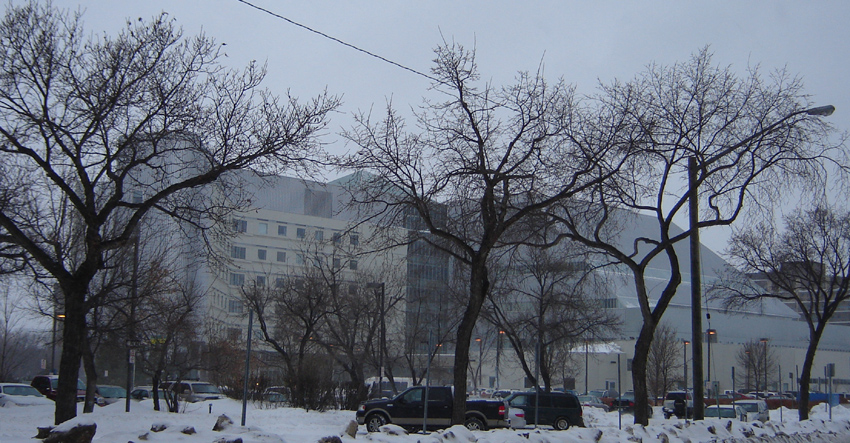

Geography
- Location: Saskatoon, Saskatchewan, Canada
- Coordinates: 52.13574°N 106.65394°W

Organization
- Care system: Public
- Type: Community

History
- Founded: 1909

Links
- Lists: Hospitals in Canada

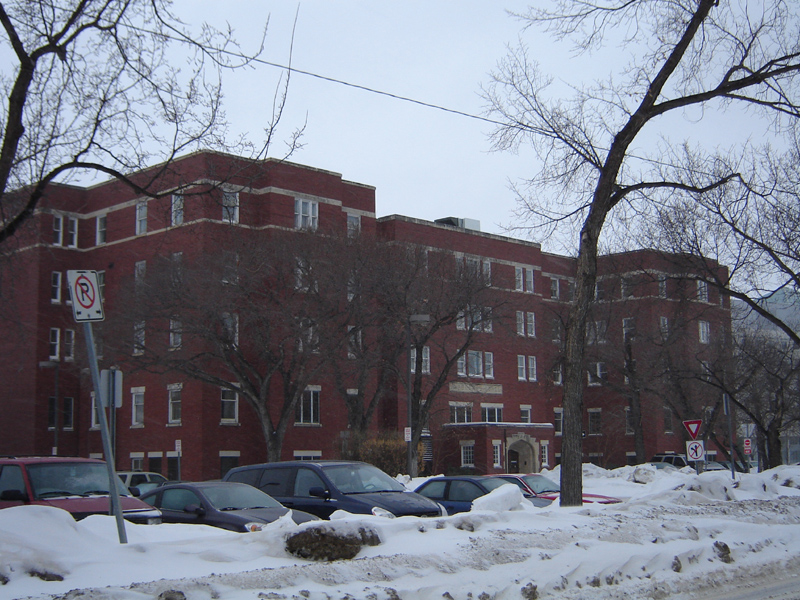
Saskatoon City Hospital Nurses Residence

Saskatoon City Hospital is a public hospital in the City Park neighbourhood of Saskatoon, Saskatchewan, Canada.

== History ==
The original hospital was opened in 1909 and was the second municipal hospital in Canada. The original structure was closed and demolished in the early 1990s, with the new City Hospital opening in 1993. The hospital is operated by the Saskatchewan Health Authority. Located close to the Royal University Hospital and only a short drive from St. Paul's Hospital, it is the only general hospital in the city that does not operate a 24-hour emergency room.

In March 2025, it was announced that he hospital had received $15 million in new funding and would add 109 beds.

== See also ==
- St. Paul's Hospital
- Royal University Hospital
- Jim Pattison Children's Hospital
- Saskatoon Health Region
