= Royal University Hospital =

Hospital in Saskatchewan, Canada

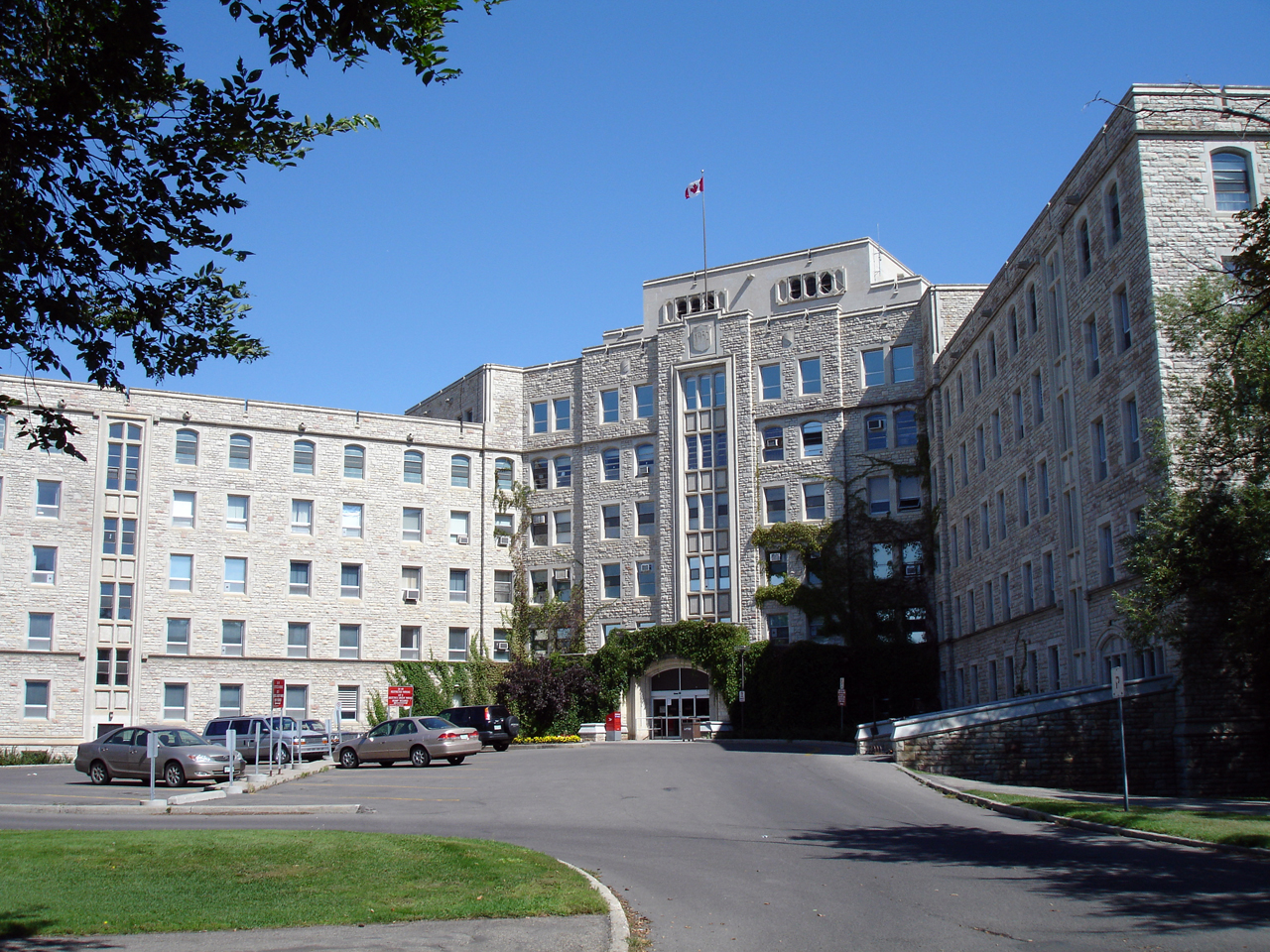
- Royal University Hospital

- Location in Saskatchewan

Geography
- Location: Saskatoon, Saskatchewan, Canada
- Coordinates: 52.130691°N 106.640795°W

Organization
- Care system: Public Medicare (Canada)
- Type: Teaching
- Affiliated university: University of Saskatchewan

Services
- Emergency department: Yes

History
- Founded: 1955

Links
- Website: www.saskatoonhealthregion.ca/locations_services/locations/ruh/Pages/Home.aspx
- Lists: Hospitals in Canada

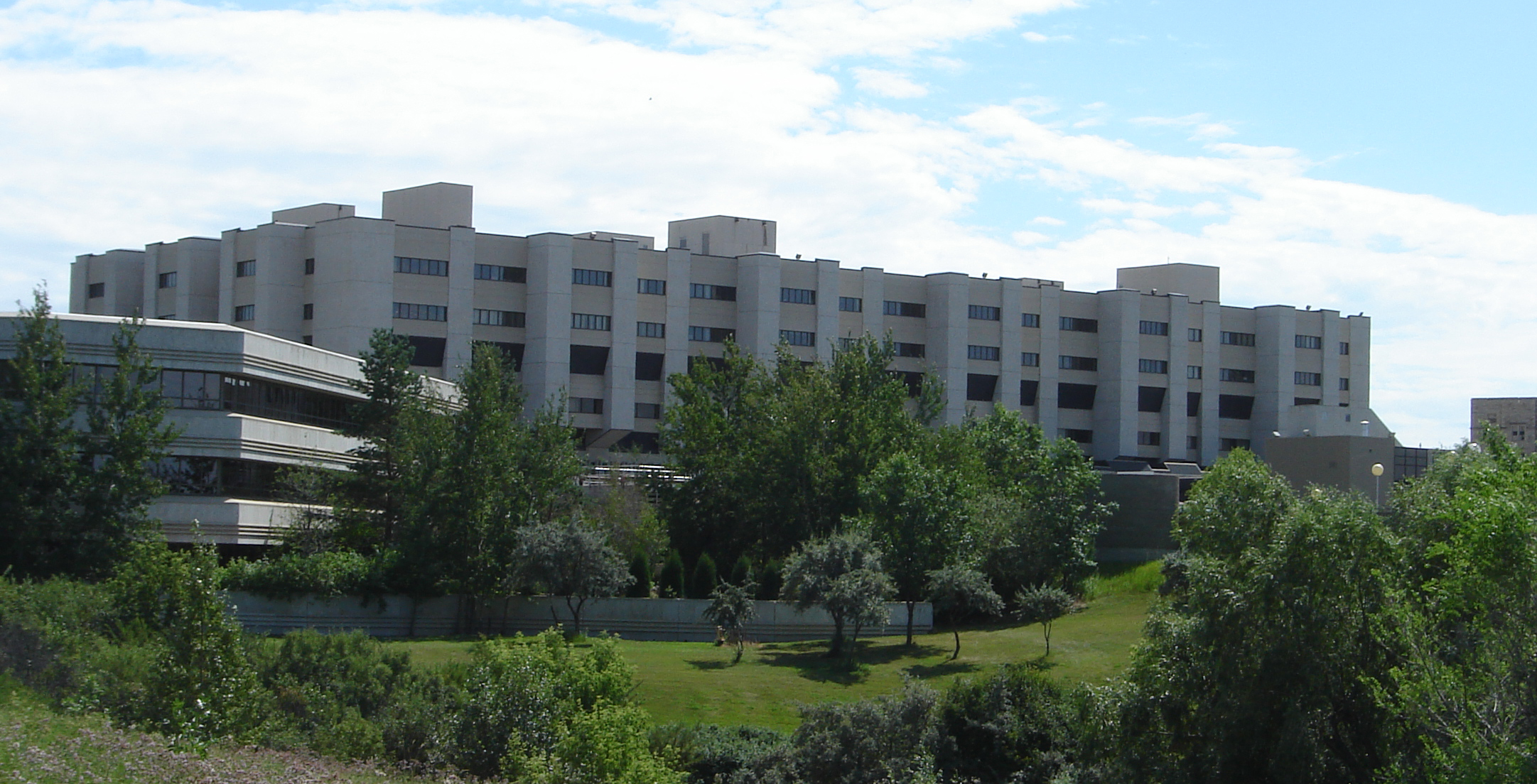
Royal University Hospital northern face

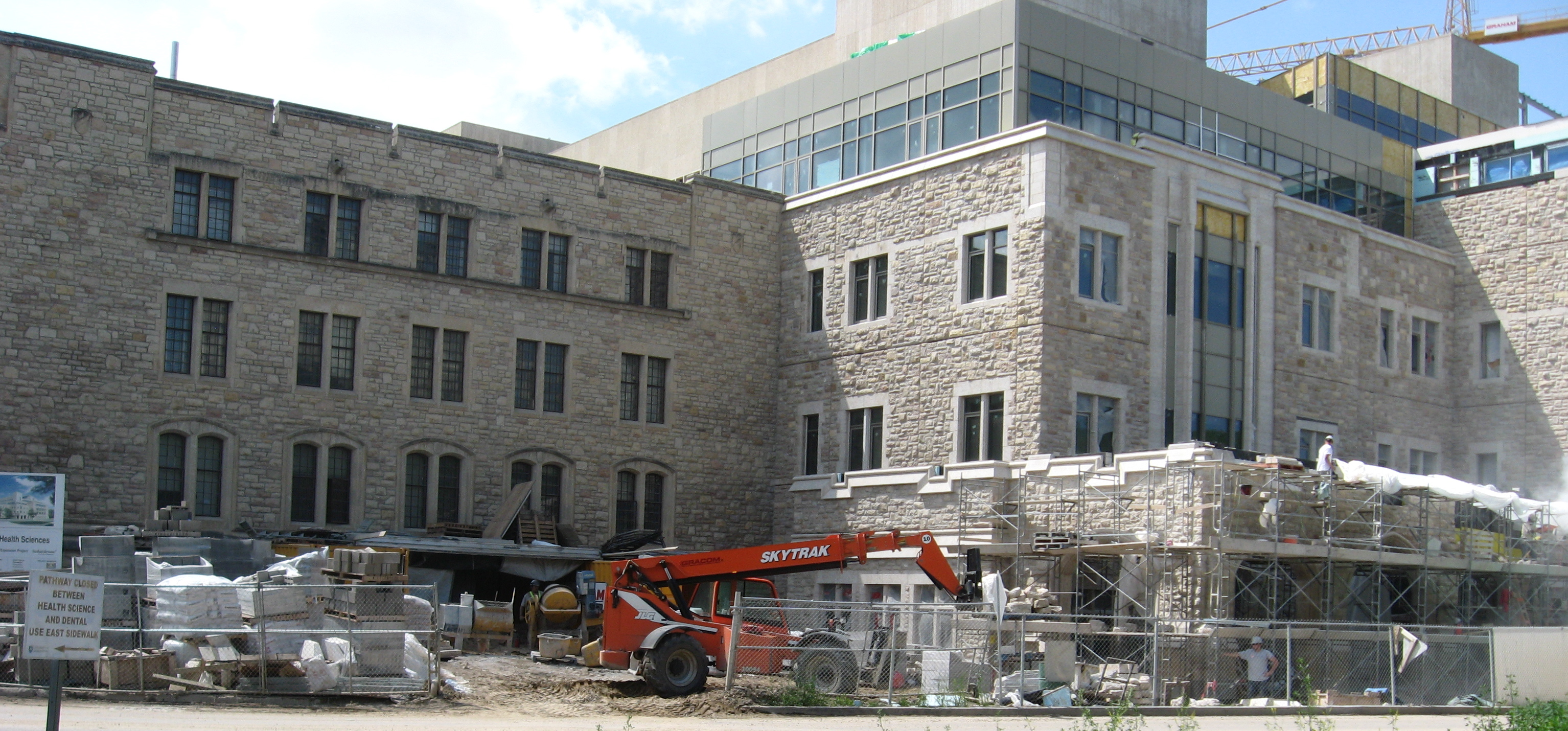
Expansion in progress, summer 2010

Coat of arms of Royal University Hospital

Royal University Hospital, often abbreviated RUH, is one of four hospitals in Saskatoon, Saskatchewan, Canada. It is located on the University of Saskatchewan campus. The RUH is a teaching hospital and closely tied to the College of Medicine within the university. It was opened on May 14, 1955 by Saskatchewan premier Tommy C. Douglas.

The seven-story seven wing structure took eight years to construct and equip, costing the people of Saskatchewan over $13,000,000. Over 16,000 tons of native limestone, quarried five miles north of campus, were used to face the half mile perimeter of the building. It is located on the banks of the South Saskatchewan River and just inside the gates of the University.

It was the largest of the buildings that made up the University's Medical Complex. It was tied directly to the Medical College Building and in proximity to the Nursing Residence (Ellis Hall) and the Hospital Laundry Building. Its opening resulted in a sudden and massive influx of specialists, many of whom held faculty positions with the College of Medicine. The University Hospital became the primary teaching and training base for the Colleges of Medicine, Nursing and Pharmacy, as well as in a number of health care technologies.

A major addition and renovation was completed in 1979. Despite being incomplete, it was nevertheless officially opened in 1978, by Elizabeth II, during her visit to Saskatoon. In 1990, on the recommendation of then-Governor General Ray Hnatyshyn, it was given royal designation, taking the title Royal University Hospital. In 2007 it was announced that it would be the site of the Saskatchewan Children's Hospital.

In 2010 the hospital renovated and reopened the renamed Cameco Skywalk, a corridor connecting the central atrium to the main entrance in the paid-parking lot which was originally constructed in 1978. It features photographic murals of well-known Saskatoon cityscapes along the river and interior skyline paintings by young artists from Saskatoon Community Youth Arts Programming. The RUH Foundation named the skywalk to recognize Cameco's $1.5-million contribution to the foundation's campaign that established the Cameco chair in aboriginal health at the University of Saskatchewan. The corridor's grand opening was marred when a patient defecated in the Skywalk on the morning of the event, as witnessed by medical trainees. There have been further issues with the hospital involving unsanitary conditions. The Skywalk was destroyed in 2014 to make room for the Children's Hospital of Saskatchewan. The Jim Pattison Children's Hospital officially opened on September 29, 2019.

It is equipped with a helipad for medical evacuations.

== See also ==
- St. Paul's Hospital
- Saskatoon City Hospital
- Jim Pattison Children's Hospital
- Vaccine and Infectious Disease Organization
