= Saskatchewan Health Authority =

- Formation: December 4, 2017
- Merger of: Cypress; Five Hills; Heartland; Keewatin Yatthe; Kelsey Trail; Mamawetan Churchill River; Prairie North; Prince Albert Parkland; Regina Qu'Appelle Health Region; Saskatoon Health Region; Sunrise; Sun Country
- Type: Saskatchewan Healthy Authority
- CEO: Andrew Will
- Budget: $4.9 billion (CDN)
- Staff: 43,352 employees, 2,700 physicians

The Saskatchewan Health Authority (SHA) is the single health region of the province of Saskatchewan. Established on December 4, 2017, it amalgamated the province's 12 former regional health authorities into one unified organization. The SHA is responsible for delivering a wide range of health services, including primary, secondary, tertiary, and quaternary care, as well as home and community care, mental health services, population and preventive health, and addiction services.

== History ==
The formation of the SHA was a significant restructuring of Saskatchewan's healthcare system. This change aimed to provide more consistent and coordinated care across the province. The transition was guided by recommendations from the Saskatchewan Advisory Panel on Health System Structure, which emphasized the need for a single provincial health authority to improve efficiency and patient care.

== Governance ==
The SHA is governed by a Board of Directors appointed by the Lieutenant Governor in Council. The Board comprises 10 members and is responsible for overseeing the organization's strategic direction, ensuring accountability, and maintaining the quality of healthcare services. Key committees within the Board include Governance and Human Resources, Quality and Safety, Audit, Finance and Risk, Practitioner Liaison, and Board Practitioner Hearing.

== Health services provided ==
Public health	Primary care	Acute care	Home & community services	Mental health & addictions	Notes
Environmental health protection: Food & water safety; Disease surveillance & control: Immunization; HIV/AIDS Programs; Children & youth services	Primary care clinics; Aboriginal services: Health & wellness; Addiction & Treatment; Community health	Hospital inpatient care; Surgery specialties & subspecialities; Complex medical surgery (tertiary & quaternary); Acute and specialized rehab; Urgent care; Same-day care; Ambulatory care	Community services; Assisted living; Home care; Occupational therapy & physiotherapy; Adult day care; Residential services; Complex care; Hospice care; Transitional care; Community Development	Housing; Emergency & urgent services; Residential & community services; Addictions; Needle exchange; Supervised Injection Site; Free safer supplies	

Leading up to and during the COVID-19 pandemic, the Saskatchewan Health Authority implemented a vaccine promotion campaign funded by a $650,642 grant from the Public Health Agency of Canada's Immunization Partnership Fund. The program used electronic reminders, in-person engagement and direct marketing to increase uptake of vaccines in general, including mobile clinics to deliver COVID-19 vaccines.

== Budget and Funding ==
In the 2025–26 provincial budget, the SHA received a $261.1 million increase, bringing its total budget to a record $4.94 billion. This funding aims to improve patient access and responsiveness within the healthcare system.

== Digital Health Initiatives ==
The SHA collaborates with eHealth Saskatchewan to provide digital health services to residents. One such service is MySaskHealthRecord, an online tool that allows individuals to access their personal health information, including laboratory results, immunization records, and clinical visit history.

== Recognition ==
In 2022, the SHA was recognized by the Institute for Patient and Family-Centered Care (IPFCC) with a Partnership Award. This award highlighted the SHA's efforts in promoting family presence and engagement in healthcare settings, especially during the challenges posed by the COVID-19 pandemic.
