= Saskatchewan Highway 11 =

Provincial highway in Saskatchewan, Canada

Highway 11
- Louis Riel Trail
- Highway 11 highlighted in red
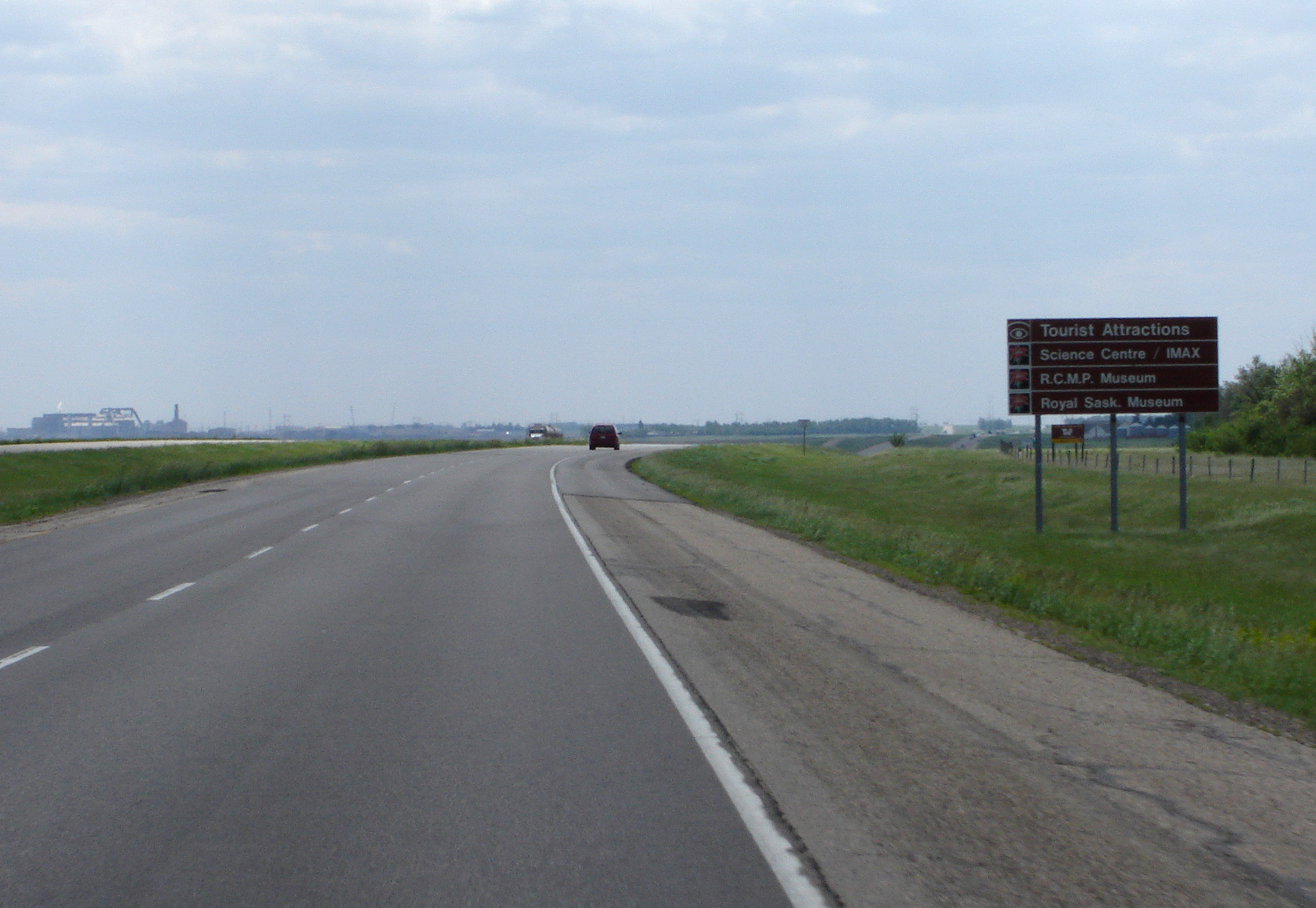
- Highway 11 approaching Regina

Route information
- Maintained by Ministry of Highways and Infrastructure & Transport Canada
- Length: 393.3 km (244.4 mi)

Major junctions
- South end: Highway 1 (TCH) in Regina
- Highway 11A near Regina; Highway 20 at Lumsden; Highway 2 at Chamberlain; Highway 44 at Davidson; Highway 15 at Kenaston; Highway 16 (TCH/YH) in Saskatoon; Highway 7 / Highway 14 in Saskatoon; Highway 5 in Saskatoon; Highway 12 in Saskatoon
- North end: Highway 2 south of Prince Albert

Location
- Country: Canada
- Province: Saskatchewan
- Rural municipalities: Sherwood No. 158, Lumsden No. 189, Dufferin No. 190, Sarnia No. 221, Craik No. 222, Arm River No. 252, Willner No. 253, McCraney No. 282, Rosedale No. 283, Dundurn No. 314, Corman Park No. 344, Rosthern No. 403, Duck Lake No. 463, Prince Albert No. 461
- Major cities: Regina, Saskatoon, Prince Albert

Highway system
- Provincial highways in Saskatchewan
← Highway 10	→ Highway 12

Highway 11 is a major north–south highway in Saskatchewan, Canada, that connects the province's three largest cities: Regina, Saskatoon, and Prince Albert. It is a structural pavement major arterial highway which is approximately 393 kilometres (244 mi) long. It is also known as the Louis Riel Trail (LRT) after the 19th century Métis leader, Louis Riel. It runs from Highway 1 (the Trans-Canada Highway) in Regina north until Highway 2 south of Prince Albert. Historically the southern portion between Regina and Saskatoon was Provincial Highway 11, and followed the Dominion Survey lines on the square, and the northern portion between Saskatoon and Prince Albert was Provincial Highway 12.

From Regina to Saskatoon, Highway 11 is a four-lane divided highway except in the village of Chamberlain, where the road narrows to two lanes through the community, including its intersection with Highway 2 south to Moose Jaw. Highway 11 passes through Saskatoon, officially following Idylwyld Drive through the downtown area; however, Circle Drive is also signed as Highway 11 which serves as bypass route. North of Saskatoon, the road continues as a four-lane divided highway past the communities of Warman, Osler, Hague, Rosthern, and Duck Lake. Highway 11 then runs through the Nisbet Provincial Forest and past the hamlet of MacDowall before it reaches its northern terminus with Highway 2 approximately 7 kilometres (4 mi) south of Prince Albert.

Most of the intersections along the highway are at-grade; however, there are several interchanges and overpasses along the Regina Bypass and through Saskatoon. There is a partial cloverleaf at Lumsden in the Qu'Appelle Valley and another one at Warman.

== History ==
=== Beginnings ===
The Qu'Appelle, Long Lake and Saskatchewan Railway came through the region between Regina and Prince Albert via Saskatoon, as early as 1890 providing an early method of travel following the Red River cart and trail days. Chamberlain and Aylesbury were first linked via a highway in 1929; before this date transportation between the two was by a variety of trails. The summer of 1929 also started another road leaving the Qu'Appelle River valley east. Construction required building up low spots with elevating graders and dump wagons operated by horses. The elevating grader was to till unbroken soil and turn it towards a conveyor which lifted the dirt into the dump wagons. This process used eight horses pulling in the front, and another eight at the rear pushing. The fresno crew constructed the level areas. Ditches were constructed on a 7% grade and filled with field rock to help prevent erosion. One of the main problems constructing the highway was the heavy field stone knolls. This highway served until 1949 when it was upgraded.

"The upland collection area for the underground streams comes together on top of the valley near Chamberlain. Highway construction surveyors had to curve the right-of-way to avoid this area. Another interesting diversion that the highway surveyors had to make, at the insistence of local residents, was to go around a large stone that had a metal marker spike in it, likely set up and recorded by early explorers. This site is now marked on the LRT with a large silhouette buffalo statue made by Don Wilkins."

The 1926 highway map of Saskatchewan marks the route of Provincial Highway 11 following along the Canadian National Railway (CNR) using township and range roads, so travel is in lines straight north, changing direction to west travel at 90 degree angles from Regina through to Saskatoon. Only Provincial Highway 12 is marked in the same fashion between Saskatoon and Prince Albert on the 1926 highway map of Saskatchewan, which has formed the base of the northern section of Highway 11. (The current Saskatchewan Highway 12 travels between Saskatoon and Shell Lake.)

As tractors replaced horses in the field and motorized vehicles replaced horses on the road, an increasing need arose to replace the early dirt trails with graded gravel highways. In the early 1930s, the gravel highway constructed between Chamberlain and Aylesbury in 1929 was further extended to Dundurn to meet this need. Shortly thereafter, the gravelled highway extended between Saskatoon and Regina.

=== Later history ===
As the Annual Average Daily Traffic (AADT) increased, the need for wider, all-weather, paved roads became increasingly apparent. As early as the 1930s, various Saskatchewan cities, towns, and rural municipalities lobbied the provincial government to develop hard surfaced roads, including Highway 11, to connect its major centres, particularly Regina, Saskatoon, Prince Albert, and Moose Jaw. Saskatoon mayor R.M. Pinder argued that Highway 11 should receive priority because "it serves the greatest number of people for the longest period of time" and its hard surfacing would facilitate the travel of American tourists to Prince Albert National Park and support transport operations to and from the Dundurn Military Camp. A dispute flared up between Saskatoon and Prince Albert community organizations over whether Highway 11 or Highway 2 should be paved first. Prince Albert advocated prioritizing Highway 2 as a more direct route between the northern and southern parts of the province and a more attractive route for American tourists driving to Prince Albert National Park. Saskatoon preferred Highway 11 because the alternative would bypass it and not provide as many Saskatchewan residents the transportation benefits of direct access to a paved highway. In 1950, the provincial government indicated that it would prioritize the paving of Highway 11 between Saskatoon and Regina; by October 1952 this section was completely paved.

The improved highway was also re-routed in some places, including the section between Bladworth and Dundurn which was completely rebuilt and bypassed. Bypasses were also built around some other towns and villages through which it had formerly passed. Although the highway's route had not entirely reached its present contours, it was made straighter; the distance traversed between Saskatoon and Regina was reduced by 27 miles. It more closely followed the CNR tracks and contained fewer right angle corners than it had in 1926. The highway between Saskatoon and Prince Albert received less attention during this period; a 1956 highway map shows that it was still almost entirely gravel.

Following the completion of the Trans-Canada Highway through Saskatchewan, federal funds became available for provincial highway projects. Highway 11 was considered an important transportation route from a national perspective, and therefore received funding under the National Highways Project. The highway between Saskatoon and Rosthern was partially paved and the remainder was oiled to create a dust-free all-weather surface, and in 1964, the last remaining gravel section of the highway, between Rosthern and its junction with Highway 2, was oiled. In the latter half of the 1960s, many sections of the highway between Regina and Saskatoon were reconstructed and given wide shoulders; previously some segments had no shoulders. During the same period, the Saskatoon to Prince Albert portion was rebuilt to "Trans-Canada standards" and extensively re-routed to follow the same course as the CNR tracks which shortened the travel distance between the two cities by 13 miles. A new route was constructed to connect Saskatoon and Rosthern via Warman and Hague. Once this phase of construction was complete, the Rosthern to Prince Albert segment was upgraded and fully paved, and the segment between MacDowall and Prince Albert was re-routed along a straighter course.

In 1960, the section between Regina and Lumsden was the first to be converted to a four lane twinned highway. Twinning the rest of highway between Saskatoon and Regina commenced in 1968 with the conversion of the segment between Saskatoon and Dundurn. Work gradually progressed until the final section between Craik to a point just north of Davidson was twinned in late 1978. With the exception of a three-kilometre, two-lane segment through Chamberlain, the newly constructed four lane sections of the highway bypassed all the towns and villages between Saskatoon and Regina. An initiative to twin the highway between Saskatoon and Prince Albert was launched in the first decade of the 21st century. In 2006, Provincial Highways and Transportation Minister Eldon Lautermilch stated that "twinning will improve the province's busiest highways to support tourism and economic development, and move our export goods to market efficiently across inter-provincial borders." Sections of highway nearest to Saskatoon were twinned first; with the paving of newly constructed lanes along a 13-kilometre (8.1 mi) stretch between Prince Albert and MacDowall, the project was completed on October 25, 2013.

In 1971, the Department of Highways was moved from Hawarden to Kenaston, which was closer to Highway 11.

On June 20, 2001, the entire length of Highway 11 was re-named the 'Louis Riel Trail' (LRT) at a ceremony which took place at the Duck Lake Regional Interpretive Centre. The LRT connects major sites of the 1885 North-West Rebellion. Mid-Lakes Community coalition, Highway 11 communities and municipalities, the Saskatchewan Métis Nation, and the Saskatchewan History and Folk Lore Society approached Highways and Transportation Minister Pat Atkinson about the designation. Saskatchewan Highway 11 is the actual course followed by the RCMP and Louis Riel to arrive at Regina for the trial of Louis Riel. The LRT sign features a red river cart featured in yellow on a blue background.

In 2008, Pinkie Road was a proposed as a four-lane twinned highway connector road linking two National Highway System routes as a part of the Asia-Pacific Gateway and Corridor Initiative (APGCI), linking Highway 1, the Trans-Canada Highway, and Highway 11. This route was expended to continue east and bypass southern and eastern Regina, connecting with Highway 1 east of the city. The Regina Bypass was opened in October 2019 with Highway 11 being designated to the western leg of the route, while a 7.3-kilometre (4.5 mi) bypassed section of Highway 11 became Highway 11A.

=== Maintenance ===
Tenders for construction work on Highway 11 in 2008 amounted to $63.3 million of which $30 million saw 35 kilometres (22 mi) twinned between Prince Albert and Saskatoon. Among the projects that had received approval were the "paving of two sections of Highway 11 including 12.1 kilometres (7.5 mi) of highway north of Osler to south of Hague, and 11.3 kilometres (7.0 mi) of highway north of Macdowall to the Junction of Highway 2". The first project was scheduled for completion by October 2008.

In 2002 a resurfacing project of 8.4 kilometres (5.2 mi) of Highway 11 was undertaken on a section 2.3 kilometres (1.4 mi) north of MacDowall. The approval for the $680,000 tender was awarded by Highways and Transportation Minister Mark Wartman.

Earlier maintenance included $897,000 for paving of 12.3 kilometres (7.6 mi) near Hanley for a project cost of $897,000. Highways and Transportation Minister Judy Bradley awarded contracts for work in 1999.

The first asphalt rubber project occurred in July 2007 on Saskatchewan Highway 11. Close to 8 kilometres (5.0 mi) near Davidson show the rubberized asphalt road surface on the right lane at a cost of $126,800. The next rubberized asphalt project in the summer of 2007, was 4 kilometres (2.5 mi) through Chamberlain. The $1.4 million spent there included the rubberized asphalt pavement surface, curbs, and catch basins.

"The mining, exploration, and oil and gas sectors across northern Saskatchewan funnel thousands of heavy trucks through Prince Albert on a daily basis. Improving this vital gateway will not only make travel safer and far more efficient for commercial traffic, but it will enhance the drive for thousand of visitors who head north each year to take advantage of our northern lakes."

== Route description ==
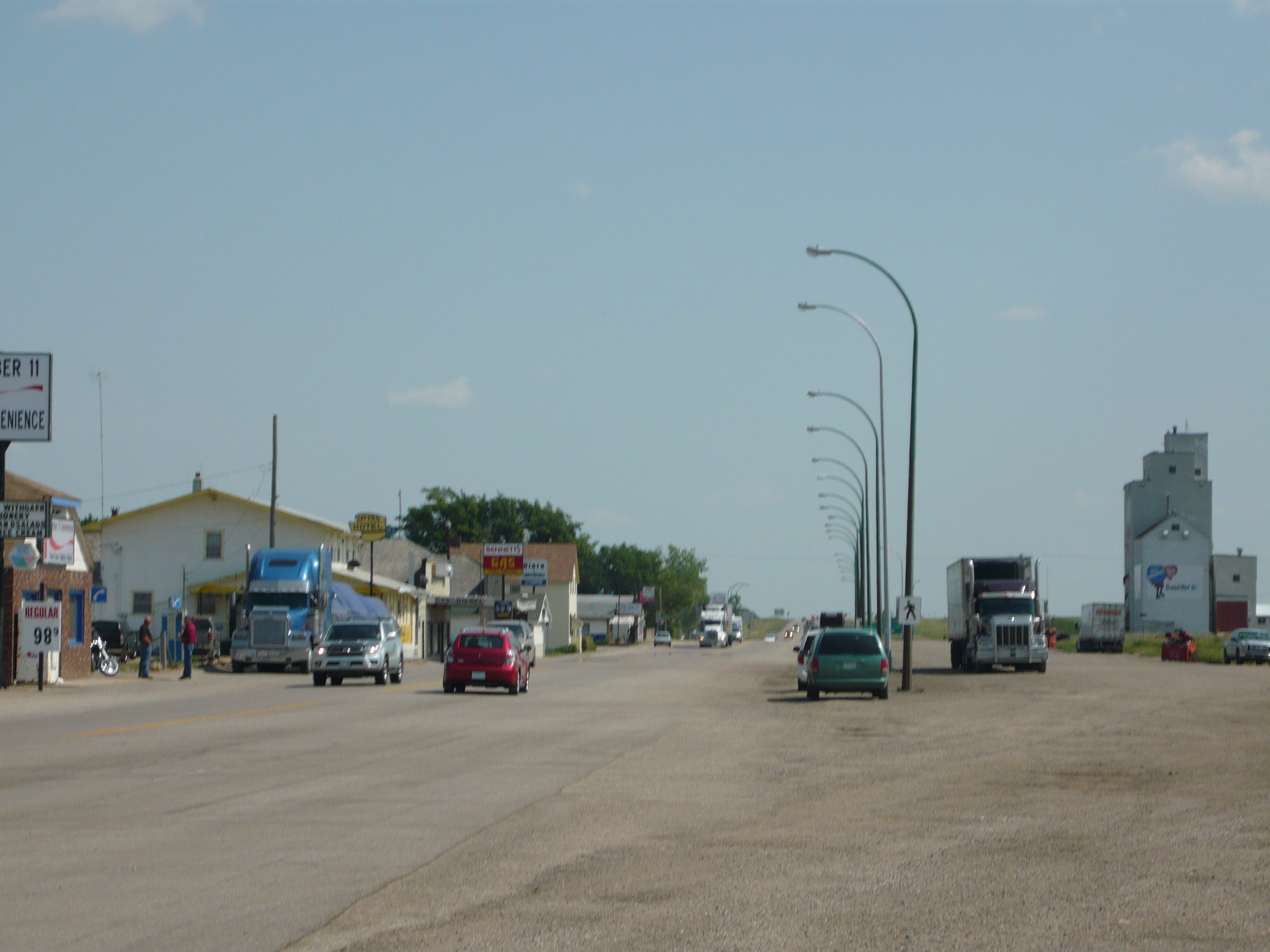
Highway 11 through Chamberlain, August 2009

Highway 11 is a major, primary weight divided highway that runs from Regina north through Saskatoon to Prince Albert. The only section not divided is a short segment through the village of Chamberlain. The highway is also known as the Louis Riel Trail. It was co-named as such in 2001 after the Métis leader Louis Riel, who was tried and hanged in Regina on September 18, 1885 for treason.

Don Wilkins, a retired farmer from Davidson, created eight metal sculptures that portray the legacy of the province's Métis people. They are at various points along Highway 11 between Regina and Prince Albert.

=== Trans-Canada Highway to Davidson ===
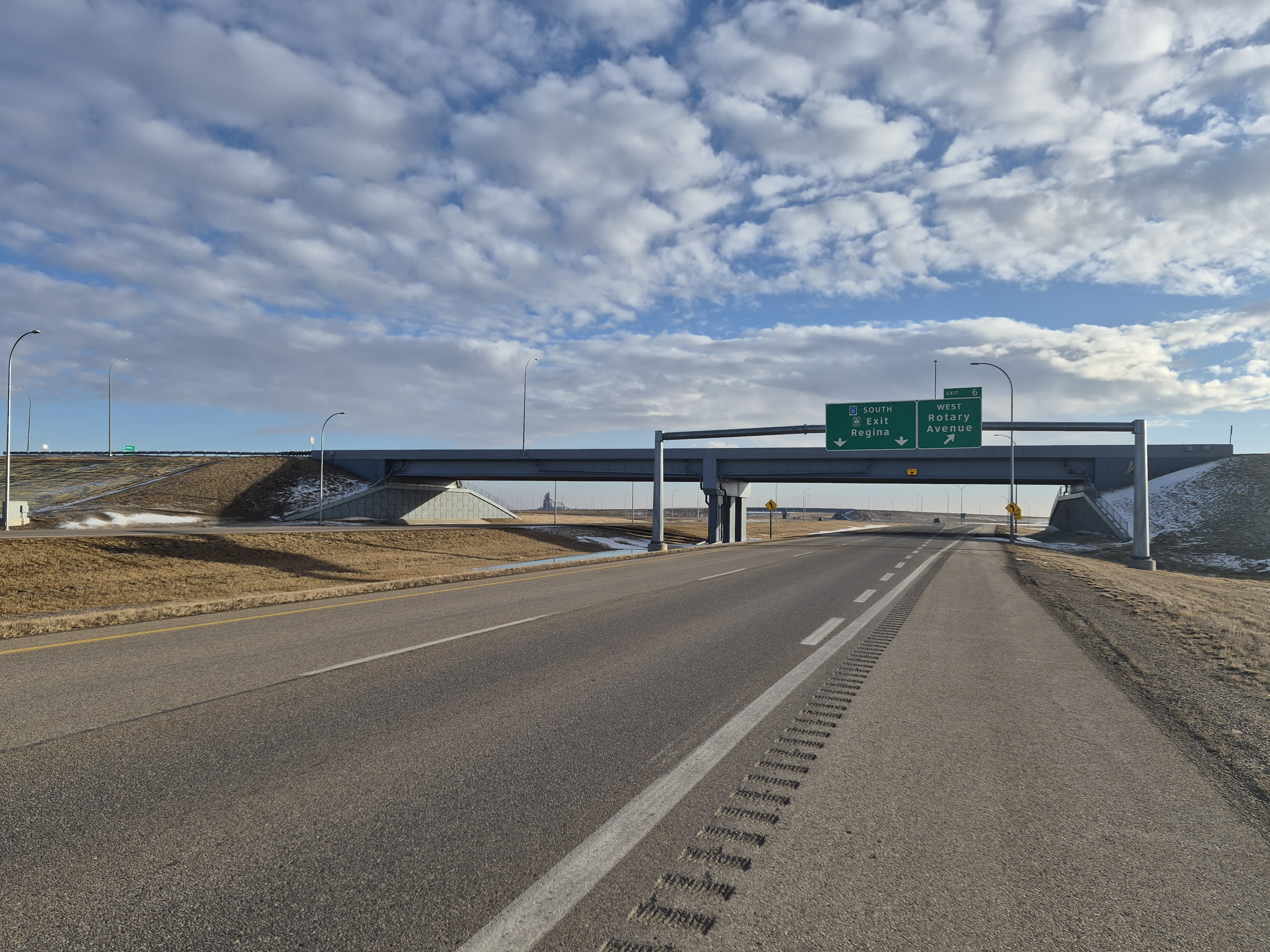
Regina Bypass

Highway 11's southern terminus begins just south-west of Regina in the Rural Municipality of Sherwood No. 159 where the Regina Bypass meets Highway 1, the Trans-Canada Highway. It then travels north along Regina's western boundary, crosses Wascana Creek, and briefly passes through Regina's city limits. Access to the Global Transportation Hub is from the Dewdney Avenue (Hwy 730) and Rotary Avenue exits. Prior to the completion of the Regina Bypass in October 2019, Highway 11 began at the junction of Victoria Avenue and Ring Road in the east end of the city, and shared an 8.2-kilometre (5.1 mi) long concurrency with Highway 6, before branching north-west from Albert Street at Regina's northern boundary, passing Pasqua Street. As part of the Regina Bypass, the Highway 11 designation was moved to the new freeway, while the bypassed section of Highway 11 between Highway 6 (Albert Street) and the Regina Bypass was redesignated as Highway 11A.

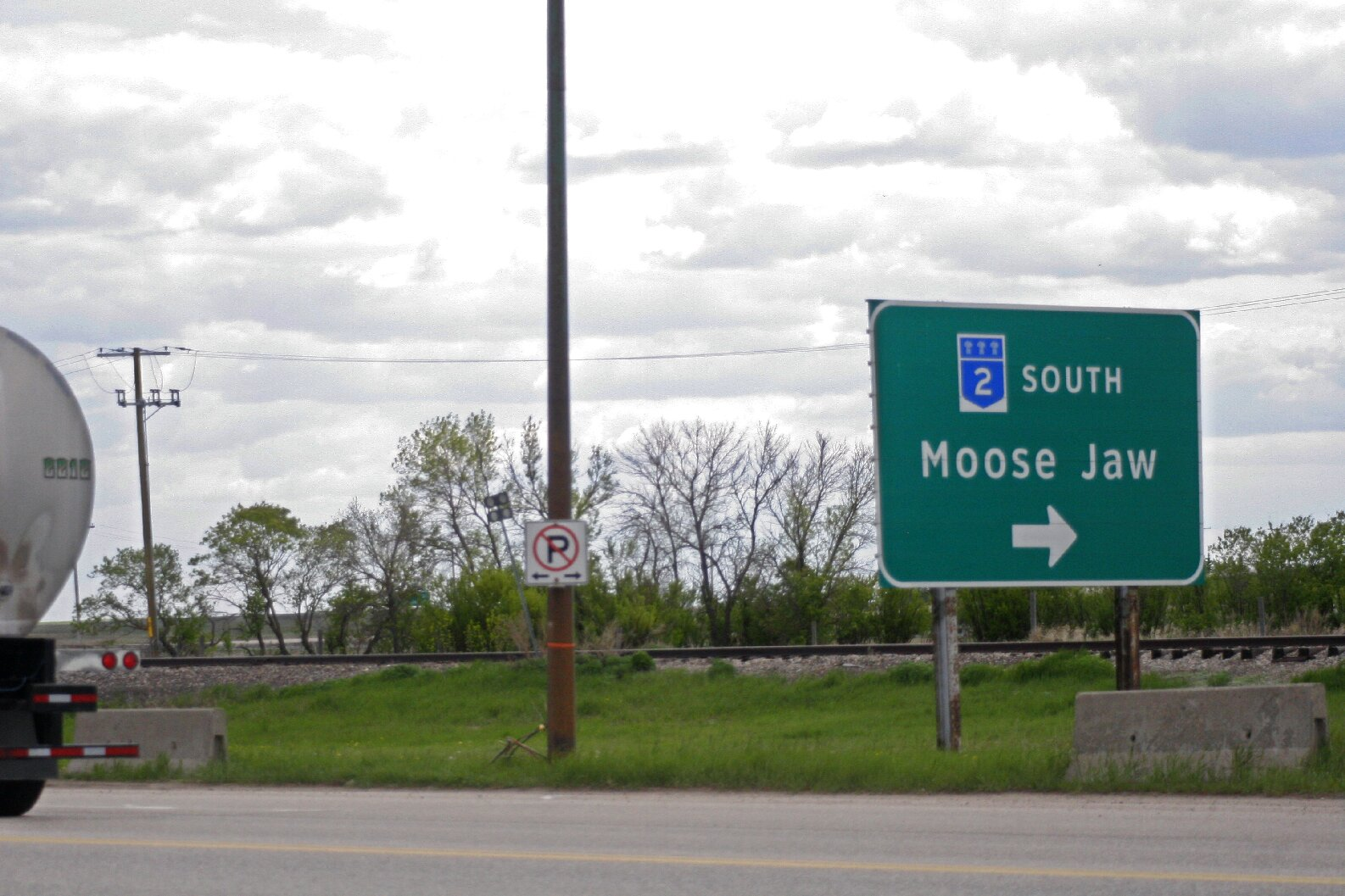
Highway 11 in Chamberlain facing southbound showcasing the directional traffic sign to Moose Jaw.

From the junction with Highway 11A, Highway 11 heads north-west where it passes a weigh station, crosses Boggy Creek, runs alongside Condie Nature Refuge, intersects Highway 734, and enters the Rural Municipality of Lumsden No. 189. Highway 11 continues north towards the Qu'Appelle Valley. As it approaches the valley, it gradually turns west and then descends into it. On the valley floor, the highway crosses the Qu'Appelle River and intersects Highway 20 in a partial cloverleaf interchange. West from the interchange is Highway 641 and the town of Lumsden, while north-east along Highway 20 is the village of Craven. From that interchange, Highway 11 climbs out of the valley and intersects Highway 54. Highway 54 heads north and provides access to Last Mountain Lake. Highway 11 continues west for a further 11 kilometres (6.8 mi), at which point, it turns north-west en route to the village of Bethune. At Bethune, three highways intersect Highway 11 — 354, 642, and 739. Continuing north-west, the highway passes the former Bethune Recreation Site and heads to Findlater. About 2 kilometres (1.2 mi) past Findlater, it begins an 11.6-kilometre (7.2 mi) long concurrency with the north–south Highway 2 (Veterans Memorial Highway) that ends in the village of Chamberlain. Southbound on 2 is Moose Jaw while northbound is Watrous and Little Manitou Lake. The 3-kilometre (1.9 mi) long section of Highway 11 through Chamberlain is the only part not twinned. Currently, there are no plans to twin this final section. Highway 11 runs through Chamberlain and twinning around the community would be expensive. On one side of Chamberlain are railway tracks that would require the building of two highway overpasses over the tracks to circumvent the village and the other side is the Arm River Valley that would require the highway to drop into the valley and then climb back out of it. Highway 11 parallels the Arm River Valley from Bethune north-west to near Girvin. North-west of Chamberlain, Highway 11 once again becomes a divided highway. It continues north-west past Aylesbury en route to Craik. The village of Craik is on the west side of the highway and Craik and District Regional Park is on the east. Highway 11 intersects Highway 732 south of Craik and Highway 643 north of it. From Craik, Highway 11 continues north-west intersecting Highway 749 at Girvin before crossing Iskwao Creek and carrying on to Davidson. Davidson is generally considered halfway between Regina and Saskatoon. Besides 11, Highways 44, 653, and 747 all converge at Davidson.

==== Regina to Davidson roadside attractions ====
Roadside attractions from Regina to Davidson include:

- Condie Nature Refuge in the RM of Sherwood No. 159
- "The Surveyor" — a Don Wilkins sculpture in Chamberlain
- "Buffalo" — a Don Wilkins sculpture and roadside pullout between Chamberlain and Aylesbury
- "New Trails Await" The Oxen — a Don Wilkins sculpture in Aylesbury
- Craik and District Regional Park in the RM of Craik No. 222
- Red River Cart and roadside pullout north of Girvin in the RM of Arm River No. 252

=== Davidson to Saskatoon ===
From Davidson, Highway 11 continues to Saskatoon. About 15 kilometres (9.3 mi) north-west of Davidson along the highway is the village of Bladworth. Kenaston, and the intersection with Highway 15, is a further 19.5 kilometres (12.1 mi) up the highway. Highway 15 is an important east–west highway that runs from Highway 16 (the Yellowhead Highway) near the Manitoba border west to Highway 4 south of Rosetown. Travelling north-west from Kenaston, Highway 11 intersects Highway 764, provides access to Hanley, and drops into the Blackstrap Coulee. In the valley, the highway passes between the southern end of Blackstrap Lake and the northern end of Indi Lake. As it climbs out of the valley, the highway straightens out and takes more of a northerly route to Saskatoon. Here, it intersects Highways 663 and 211. Highway 211 goes west into Dundurn and east into Blackstrap Provincial Park. CFD Dundurn is located north-west of Dundurn along Brightwater Creek. A further 18 kilometres (11 mi) north of Dundurn, Highway 11 enters the city of Saskatoon.

==== Davidson to Saskatoon roadside attractions ====
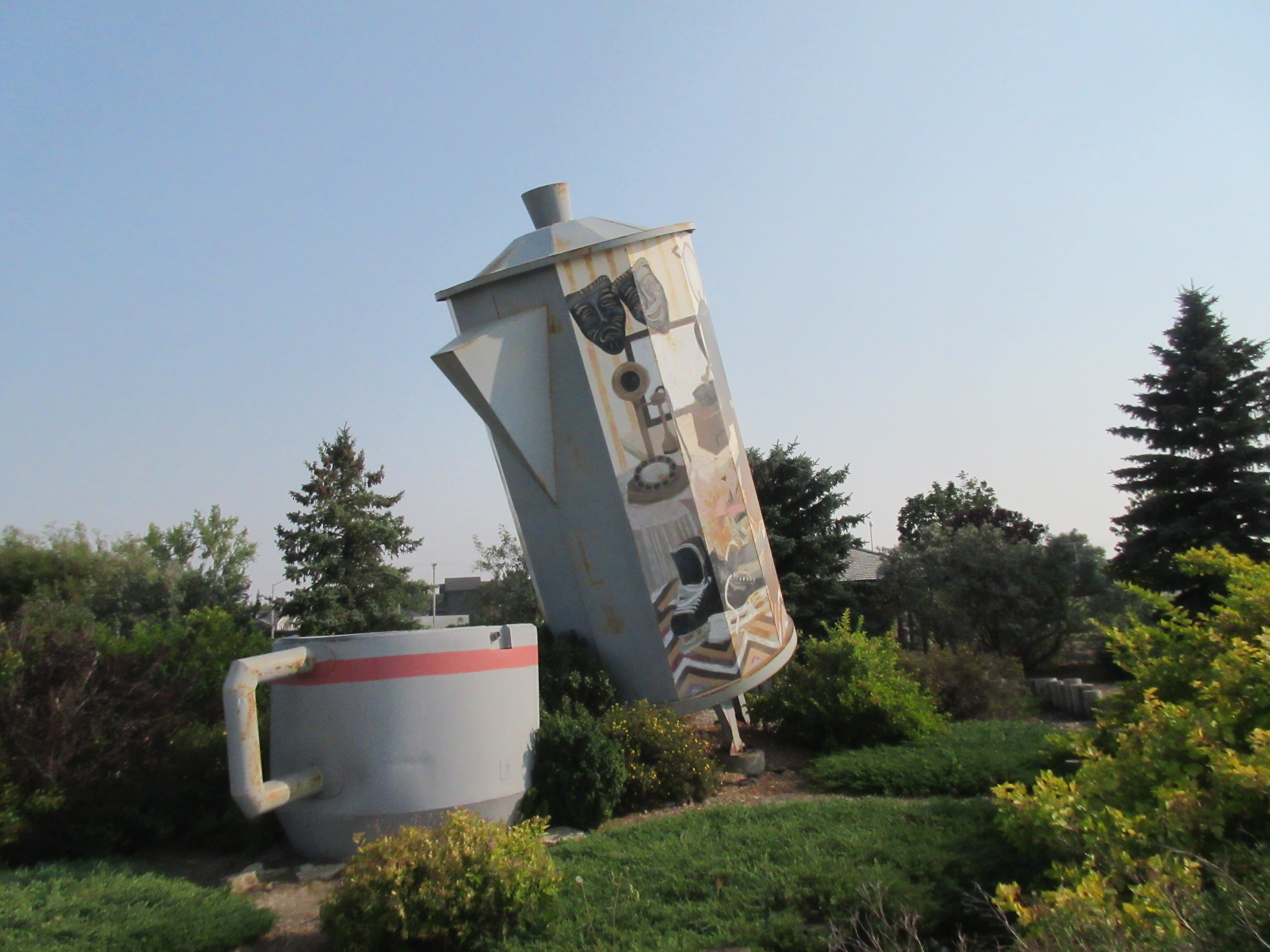
Big Coffee Pot and Cup in Davidson

Roadside attractions from Davison to Saskatoon include:

- "The Fiddler" — a Don Wilkin's Art Installation in Davidson
- Big Coffee Pot and Cup at a roadside pullout in Davidson
- Louis Riel Trail Stop — a roadside pullout on the east side of the highway from Bladworth
- Kenaston Snowman in Kenaston
- Bonnington Springs Campground in Kenaston
- "The Lesson" — a Don Wilkins Art Installation in the RM of Rosedale No. 283
- "Red River Cart" — a sculpture by Don Wilkins in Hanley
- "The Bone Gatherer" — a Don Wilkins art installation in Dundurn
- Saskatchewan International Raceway — 8 miles south of Saskatoon

=== Saskatoon ===
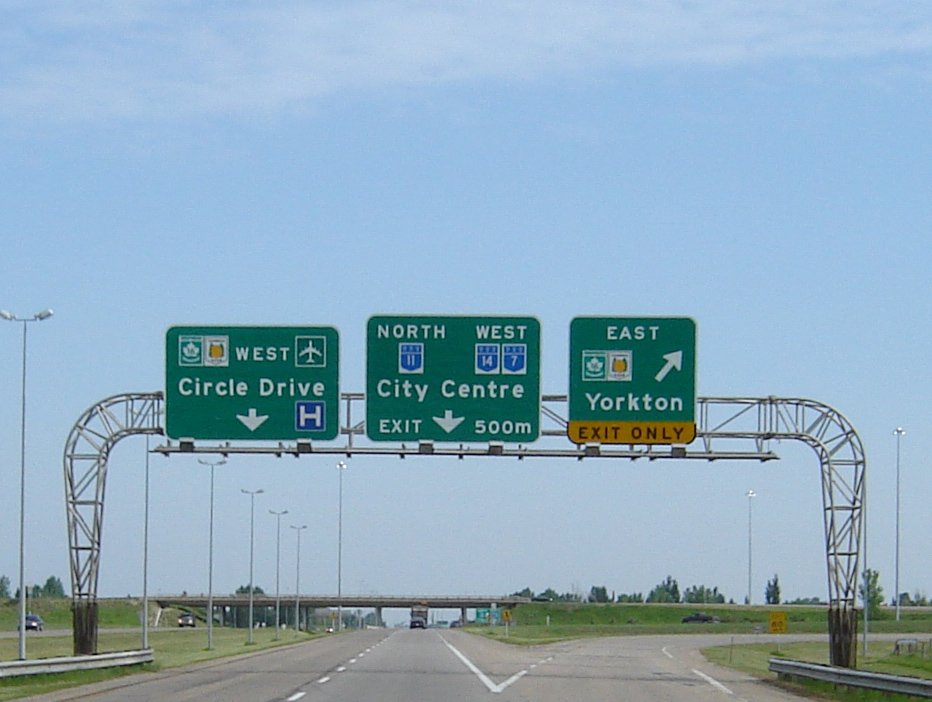
Highway 11 northbound, approaching the Cloverleaf.

Highway 11 enters Saskatoon with the neighbourhood of Stonebridge on the west and the South East Development Area on the east. It then enters into a cloverleaf interchange with Highway 16 (the Yellowhead Highway) with Highway 16 continuing north and Highway 11 exiting west as part of Circle Drive. This cloverleaf interchange, which opened in 1967, was one of the first two interchanges in Saskatchewan. Circle Drive and Highway 11 run concurrently west for 4 kilometres (2.5 mi) at which point Highway 11 turns north as Idylwyld Drive Freeway while Circle Drive continues west over the South Saskatchewan River via the Gordie Howe Bridge. Highway 11, travelling north, crosses the South Saskatchewan River via the Senator Sid Buckwold Bridge and enters downtown Saskatoon. It runs along the western boundary of downtown as an arterial roadway concurrently with Idylwyld Drive. The highway intersects Highways 7 and 14 at 22nd Street and Highway 5 at 25th Street. It rejoins Circle Drive and Highway 16 2.7 kilometres (1.7 mi) north of downtown at a diamond interchange. Highway 11 and 16 then share a 2.8-kilometre (1.7 mi) northbound concurrency as a short freeway. Highway 16 branches to the north-west, and 2.6 kilometres (1.6 mi) farther north, Highway 11 branches north-east at an intersection with Highway 12 and leaves Saskatoon en route to Highway 2 and Prince Albert.

Numerous attractions in Saskatoon, the largest city of Saskatchewan, include the Forestry Farm Park and Zoo, Remai Modern Art Gallery, and the Wanuskewin Heritage Park.

=== Saskatoon to Highway 2 ===
This segment of Highway 11 travels north-northeast roughly paralleling the South Saskatchewan River to its northern terminus at Highway 2, about 6.5 kilometres (4.0 mi) south of downtown Prince Albert. From the intersection with Highway 12, Highway 11 heads north-east then north-northeast to the city of Warman. At Warman, it intersects with Highway 784 at central part of the city and Highway 305 (via a partial cloverleaf) at the north end. From 305, it turns north and travels through Osler. About a mile north of Osler, the highway resumes its north-northeasterly travel and provides access to the communities of Reinland, Neuanlage, Hochstadt, and Hague. At Hague, it intersects with Highway 785. Highway 11 travels a further 17.3 kilometres (10.7 mi) from the intersection with 785 to the town of Rosthern and Highway 312. Valley Regional Park, situated on the western shore of Rempel Lake, is about a mile further along 11 on the eastern side of the highway. Continuing from the regional park, Highway 11 heads past Duck Lake to the town of Duck Lake and the intersection with Highways 212 and 783. Duck Lake is near the location of the Battle of Duck Lake that occurred in 1885. There is the commemorative Duck Lake Monument west along Highway 212. The final leg of this stretch of highway from Duck Lake to its northern terminus travels in a north-easterly direction. It travels through the Nisbet Provincial Forest with several access points along the highway. Coming out of the forest, Highway 11 pulls away from the South Saskatchewan River as the river turns east while the highway continues north-east. It passes through MacDowall and Clouston before reaching its northern terminus at Highway 2 (Veterans Memorial Highway) south of Prince Albert. The North Saskatchewan River is only 7.1 kilometres (4.4 mi) north of Highway 11's northern terminus.

==== Saskatoon to Prince Albert roadside attractions ====
Roadside attractions from Saskatoon to the highway's northern terminus at Highway 2 south of Prince Albert include:

- Sutherland Automotive Speedway — just north of Saskatoon
- Valley Regional Park — north of Rosthern
- Duck Lake Regional Interpretive Centre — at Duck Lake
- Our Lady Of Lourdes Mini Shrine — north-west of Duck Lake at the southern edge of the Nisbet Provincial Forest
- Access to Nisbet Forest trails
- Eb's Nordic Ski Trails in the Nisbet Forest
- Valleys of the Saskatchewan Map at the northern edge of the Nisbet Forest
- Vintage Power Machines Museum — museum north-west of Clouston

== Major intersections ==
From south to north:

Rural municipality	Location	km	mi	Exit	Destinations	Notes
Sherwood No. 159		0.0	0.0	0	Highway 1 (TCH) / Regina Bypass east / Ring Road east – Moose Jaw, Winnipeg	Interchange; Highway 11 southern terminus; southbound signed as exits 0A (east), exit 0B (west), and exit 0C (south); exit 258 on Highway 1; Regina Bypass continues as Highway 1 east
Sherwood No. 159		3.6	2.2	4	Pinkie Road	Interchange
City of Regina		5.1	3.2	6	Rotary Avenue	Interchange
City of Regina		5.6	3.5	7	Dewdney Avenue	Interchange; southbound exit and northbound entrance; to Highway 730 west
City of Regina		7.6	4.7	11	9th Avenue N	Interchange
City of Regina		9.6	6.0	14	Armour Road	At-grade
Sherwood No. 159		12.7	7.9	19	Highway 11A south – Regina City Centre	Interchange; north end of Regina Bypass
Sherwood No. 159–Lumsden No. 189 boundary		18.1	11.2	A	Highway 734 (Township Road 190)	At-grade diamond interchange
Lumsden No. 189		22.4	13.9	B	Township Road 192	At-grade diamond interchange
Lumsden No. 189		28.8	17.9	C	Range Road 2211	At-grade diamond interchange
Lumsden No. 189	Lumsden	32.4	20.1	Crosses the Qu'Appelle River		
Lumsden No. 189	Lumsden	32.9	20.4	—	Highway 20 north – Craven Highway 641 south – Pense	Interchange
Lumsden No. 189		38.7	24.0		Highway 54 north – Regina Beach	
Lumsden No. 189–Dufferin No. 190 boundary		46.8	29.1		Disley Access Road	
Dufferin No. 190		58.8	36.5		Highway 354 north – Dilke Highway 642 south – Belle Plaine	
Dufferin No. 190	Bethune	59.8	37.2		Highway 739 west	
Dufferin No. 190		77.9	48.4		Highway 2 north (Veterans Memorial Highway) – Prince Albert	South end of Highway 2 wrong-way concurrency
Sarnia No. 221	Chamberlain	89.4	55.6		Highway 2 south (Veterans Memorial Highway) – Moose Jaw Highway 733 east (Valley Road) – Dilke	North end of Highway 2 wrong-way concurrency
Craik No. 222		116.5	72.4		Highway 732	
Craik No. 222	Craik	117.4	72.9		Mary Street	Craik south access
Craik No. 222	Craik	119.7	74.4		Highway 643 south – Keeler	Craik north access
Arm River No. 252	Girvin	131.9	82.0		Highway 749 – Liberty, Elbow	
Arm River No. 252	Davidson	143.8	89.4		Railway Street	Davidson south access
Arm River No. 252	Davidson	147.0	91.3		Highway 44 west – Davidson, Loreburn Highway 653 north / Highway 747 east – Imperial	Davidson north access
Willner No. 253	No major junctions					
Rosedale No. 283	Kenaston	179.8	111.7		Highway 15 – Outlook, Nokomis	
Rosedale No. 283	Hanley	196.7	122.2		Highway 764 – Broderick, Watrous	
Dundurn No. 314		215.5	133.9		Highway 663 north – Floral	
Dundurn No. 314	Dundurn	218.7	135.9		Highway 211 east – Blackstrap Provincial Park	
Dundurn No. 314		223.6	138.9		North Grid Road (Township Road 334)	Access to CFAD Dundurn
Corman Park No. 344		246.9	153.4		Floral Road / Grasswood Road	At-grade diamond interchange
City of Saskatoon		249.7	155.2	—	Victor Road	Half-diamond interchange; southbound exit and northbound entrance
City of Saskatoon		250.9	155.9	—	Highway 16 (TCH/YH) east – Yorkton Circle Drive (Highway 11 north / Highway 16 west)	Interchange; Highway 11 officially follows Circle Drive west; Highway 16 officially follows Circle Drive north; Circle Drive is signed as Highway 11 / Highway 16 in its entirety
City of Saskatoon		252.1	156.6	—	Preston Avenue	Interchange
City of Saskatoon		253.8	157.7	—	Clarence Avenue	Interchange
City of Saskatoon		254.9	158.4	—	Circle Drive (Highway 11 north / Highway 16 west) / Idylwyld Drive	Interchange; no exit from eastbound Circle Drive; Highway 11 officially follows Idylwyld Drive (unsigned)
City of Saskatoon		256.1	159.1	—	Lorne Avenue (Highway 219 south) / Ruth Street	Interchange
City of Saskatoon		258.1	160.4	—	8th Street / Lorne Avenue	Southbound exit and northbound entrance
City of Saskatoon		258.8	160.8	Senator Sid Buckwold Bridge over South Saskatchewan River		
City of Saskatoon		258.9	160.9	—	1st Avenue – City Centre	Northbound exit and southbound entrance
City of Saskatoon		259.6	161.3		22nd Street / Highway 7 west / Highway 14 – Rosetown, Biggar	
City of Saskatoon		260.1	161.6		25th Street (Highway 5 east) – Humboldt	
City of Saskatoon		262.8	163.3	—	Circle Drive (Highway 11 south / Highway 16 east)	Interchange; south end of Highway 16 concurrency; Highway 11 south signed to follow Circle Drive; Highway 16 officially follows Circle Drive east
City of Saskatoon		264.1	164.1	—	Avenue C south / 51 Street east – Airport	Interchange
City of Saskatoon		265.3	164.8	—	Highway 16 (TCH/YH) west – The Battlefords	Northbound exit and southbound entrance; north end of Highway 16 concurrency
City of Saskatoon		266.9	165.8		Marquis Drive	Southbound access to Highway 16 west
Corman Park No. 344		267.9	166.5	—	Highway 12 north – Martensville, Blaine Lake	Interchange; northbound exit and southbound entrance
Corman Park No. 344		272.3	169.2		Wanuskewin Road	To Wanuskewin Heritage Park; becomes Warman Road in Saskatoon
Corman Park No. 344	Warman	283.2	176.0		Highway 784 east – Clarkboro Ferry, Aberdeen	Northbound right-in/right-out
Corman Park No. 344	Warman	283.2	176.0		Central Street	No northbound entrance
Corman Park No. 344	Warman	285.6	177.5	—	Highway 305 west – Dalmeny, Langham	Interchange; southbound access to Highway 784 east
Corman Park No. 344	Osler	288.8	179.5		Township Road 393	Osler south access
Corman Park No. 344	Osler	290.4	180.4		Township Road 394	Osler north access
Rosthern No. 403	Hague	309.1	192.1		Highway 785 – Hepburn, Hague Ferry, Aberdeen	
Rosthern No. 403	Rosthern	326.4	202.8		Highway 312 – Waldheim, Wakaw	
Duck Lake No. 463	Duck Lake	344.7	214.2		Highway 212 west – Beardy's & Okemasis Highway 783 – St. Laurent Ferry, Wingard Ferry	To Fort Carlton Provincial Historic Park
Prince Albert No. 461	Prince Albert	393.3	244.4		Highway 2 (Veterans Memorial Highway) – Prince Albert, La Ronge, Moose Jaw	Highway 11 northern terminus
1.000 mi = 1.609 km; 1.000 km = 0.621 mi: Concurrency terminus; Incomplete access; Route transition

== Highway 11A ==
Highway 11A
- Location: Regina
- Length: 7.3 km (4.5 mi)

Highway 11A is a short freeway serving the city of Regina. It runs from the intersection with Highway 6 at Regina's northern city limit to Highway 11, about 7 kilometres (4 mi) north-west of Regina. It is the original configuration for Highway 11 as it approached Regina and was designated after the Regina Bypass was opened in October 2019.

Highway 11 used to be signed through Regina along Albert Street and Ring Road to Victoria Avenue where it terminated at Highway 1 (the Trans-Canada Highway); however, the Highway 11A designation only pertains to the area outside city limits where it is under provincial jurisdiction. Highway 11A is largely unsigned, with signage reflecting Highway 11.

=== Major junctions ===
From south to north. All exits are unnumbered.

Location	km	mi	Destinations	Notes
Regina	−1.5	−0.93	Albert Street – City Centre Ring Road (Highway 6 south) to Highway 1	
Regina	0.0	0.0	Highway 6 north / CanAm Highway north (Albert Street N) – Southey, Melfort	Northbound exit and southbound entrance
Sherwood No. 159	2.0	1.2	Pasqua Street	
Sherwood No. 159	7.3	4.5	Highway 11 / Regina Bypass to Highway 1 – Saskatoon	Continues as Highway 11 north; Highway 11 exit 19
1.000 mi = 1.609 km; 1.000 km = 0.621 mi: Closed/former; Incomplete access

== See also ==
- Transportation in Saskatchewan
- Roads in Saskatchewan
- Numbered highways in Canada
