= Saskatchewan Highway 354 =

Provincial highway in Saskatchewan, Canada

Highway 354

Route information
- Maintained by Ministry of Highways and Infrastructure
- Length: 20.1 km (12.5 mi)

Major junctions
- South end: Highway 11 / Highway 642 at Bethune
- North end: Highway 732 / Highway 733 at Dilke

Location
- Country: Canada
- Province: Saskatchewan
- Rural municipalities: Dufferin, Sarnia

Highway system
- Provincial highways in Saskatchewan
← Highway 350	→ Highway 355

Highway 354 is a provincial highway in the Canadian province of Saskatchewan. It runs from the junction with Highway 11 (Louis Riel Trail) and Highway 642 on the east side of Bethune to the intersection of Highways 732 and 733 in the village of Dilke. In addition to providing a connection between Highway 11 and Dilke, Highway 354 also provides access to several lakeside communities along the western shore of Last Mountain Lake. It is about 20 kilometres (12 mi) long.

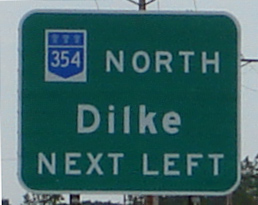
Saskatchewan Highway 354 North, Dilke Next Left intersection. Photo taken from Saskatchewan Highway 11, travelling south from Saskatoon to Regina.

== Route description ==
Highway 354 begins in the Rural Municipality of Dufferin No. 190 at the junction between Highway 11 (Louis Riel Trail) and Hwy 642 on the eastern side of the village of Bethune. It heads due north to cross the Arm River Valley (includes crossing a bridge over the river itself) to travel through rural farmland for the next several kilometres, having intersections with Moorland Road (provides access to Highwood Beach, Kedleston Beach, and Marion Heights) and Township Road 220 (provides access to Kedleston), where it enters the Rural Municipality of Sarnia No. 221. The highway now crosses a former railway line before making a sharp left turn at an intersection with Highway 733B, heading due west for about 3 kilometres (1.9 mi) to enter the eastern edge of the village of Dilke, where it comes to an end at the junction between Highway 732 and Hwy 733. The road continues east into Dilke as westbound Hwy 733. The entire of Highway 354 is a paved, two-lane highway.

== Major intersections ==
From south to north:

Rural municipality	Location	km	mi	Destinations	Notes
Dufferin No. 190	Bethune	0.0	0.0	Highway 642 south – Belle Plaine Highway 11 (Louis Riel Trail) – Regina, Saskatoon	Southern terminus; Northern terminus of Hwy 642; road continues as southbound Hwy 642
Dufferin No. 190		2.8	1.7	Bridge over the Arm River	
Dufferin No. 190		7.1	4.4	Moorland Road – Highwood Beach, Kedleston Beach, Marion Heights	
Dufferin No. 190 / Sarnia No. 221 boundary		13.5	8.4	Township Road 220 – Kedleston	
Sarnia No. 221		16.8	10.4	Highway 733B west (Township Road 222) – Grandview Beach, Wee Too Beach, Alice Beach, Eldora Beach	
Sarnia No. 221	Dilke	20.1	12.5	Highway 732 west / Range Road 2242 – Sarnia Beach, Holdfast Highway 733 west (Township Toad 222) to Highway 2 – Chamberlain	Northern terminus; eastern terminus of both Hwy 732 and Hwy 733; road continues as westbound Hwy 733
1.000 mi = 1.609 km; 1.000 km = 0.621 mi

== See also ==
- Transportation in Saskatchewan
- Roads in Saskatchewan
