= Last Mountain Railway =

Short line railway in Saskatchewan, Canada

Overview
- Reporting mark: LMR
- Locale: Saskatchewan
- Dates of operation: 2009–

Technical
- Track gauge: 4 ft 8 1/2 in (1,435 mm) standard gauge

The Last Mountain Railway (reporting mark LMR) is a Canadian short line railway company and a subsidiary of Mobil Grain Ltd. LMR operates on trackage between Regina and Davidson in Saskatchewan, established in 2009. The trackage was formerly operated by Canadian National, the LMR interlines with Canadian National in both Regina and Davidson. This subdivision is part of the former Canadian National line (CN Craik Subdivision) that links Regina and Saskatoon. Freight railway stations along the line include Davidson, Girvin, Craik, Aylesbury, Chamberlain, Findlater, Bethune, Disley, Lumsden, Condie and Regina. All locomotives used on LMR are owned by Mobil Grain (MGLX) and also utilized on their sister company, Big Sky Rail Corp.

== Locomotive roster ==
Unit	Model	Built	Acquired	Retired	Status	Notes	Image
601	GE 70 Ton		2011	N/A	N/A	Former Modesto & Empire Traction	
602	GE 70 Ton		2011	N/A	N/A	Former Modesto & Empire Traction	
603	GE 70 Ton		2011	N/A	N/A	Former Modesto & Empire Traction	
604	GE 70 Ton		2011	N/A	N/A	Former Modesto & Empire Traction; Replaced Track Mobile 4000 in Bethune, Saskatchewan	
605	GE 70 Ton		2011	N/A	N/A	Former Modesto & Empire Traction	
607	GE 70 Ton		2011	N/A	N/A	Former Modesto & Empire Traction	
608	GE 70 Ton		2011	N/A	N/A	Former Modesto & Empire Traction	
1009	B23-7		2009	2010	Retired/Sold	Sold to Stewart Southern Railway	
1010	B23-7		2009	2010	Retired/Sold	Sold to Stewart Southern Railway	
3130	SD40-3	1969	2011	N/A	Active	Former KCS 3130, rebuilt in 1998 as KCS 6607 from SD40 CN 5091.	
3138	SD40-3	1969	2011	N/A	Active	Former KCS 3138, previously KCS 3128, rebuilt in 1998 as KCS 6600 from SD40 CN 5088.	
3143	SD40-3	1971	2011	N/A	Active	Former KCS 3143, rebuilt in 1998 as KCS 6601 from SD40 CN 5214.	
3147	SD40-3	1970	2011	N/A	Active	Former KCS 3147, rebuilt in 1998 as KCS 6606 from SD40 CN 5147.	
5491	SD40M-2	1966	2015	N/A	Active	Former CP 5491, rebuilt in 1995 from SD40 NREX 3022, previously UP 3022.	
5493	SD40M-2	1968	2015	N/A	Active	Former CP 5493, rebuilt in 1995 from SD45 DRGW 5333.	
5865	SD40-2	1984	2020	N/A	Active	Former CP 5865.	
5919	SD40-2	1979	2020	N/A	Active	Former CP 5919.	
5954	SD40-2	1980	2020	N/A	Active	Former CP 5954.	
6014	SD40-2	1980	2020	N/A	Active	Former CP 6014.	
6901	SD40-3	1971	2010	N/A	Active	Rebuilt from CN SD40 5176	
6934	SD40-3	1969	2010	N/A	Active		
6935	SD40-3	1971	2010	N/A	Active	Rebuilt by GEC-Alstom from CN SD40 5199	

== See also ==
Qu'Appelle, Long Lake and Saskatchewan Railroad and Steamboat Company
