= Arm River (Saskatchewan) =

River in Saskatchewan, Canada

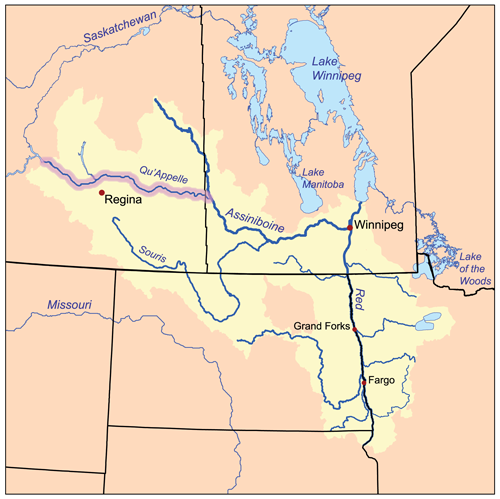
- The Red River drainage basin, with the Qu'Appelle River highlighted

- Location in Saskatchewan Arm River (Saskatchewan) (Canada)

Location
- Country: Canada
- Provinces: Saskatchewan

Physical characteristics
- Source: Allan Hills
- Mouth: Last Mountain Lake
  - location: at Little Arm Bay
  - coordinates: 50.7849°N 105.0416°W
  - elevation: 490 m (1,610 ft)

Basin features
- River system: Red River drainage basin

Arm River is a river in the Canadian province of Saskatchewan. It is located in the south central part of the province in a region called the Prairie Pothole Region of North America, which extends throughout three Canadian provinces and five U.S. states. It is also within Palliser's Triangle and the Great Plains ecoregion.

The river is a main tributary of Last Mountain Lake and is part of the Last Mountain Lake Sub-basin of the Upper Qu'Appelle Watershed. Last Mountain Creek drains Last Mountain Lake into the Qu'Appelle River near Craven.

== River's course ==
The Arm River starts in the south-east corner of the Allan Hills in the RM of McCraney, near Horseshoe Lake. From there it heads south through a coulee into Vanzance Lake and then onto Arm Lake, near Craik and Highway 11. From Arm Lake, it parallels Highway 11 in a south-east direction through a valley that was formed during the last ice age over 11,000 years ago. Near Bethune, Arm River heads east and empties into Last Mountain Lake at Little Arm Bay. Last Mountain Lake Indian reserve is located on both sides of the bay and Regina Beach is located to the east of the reserve and bay. Directly across the lake from the bay is Pelican Point, which is where the community of Pelican Pointe is located.

== Arm Lake ==
Arm Lake (51.0667°N 105.8009°W), also known as Craik Reservoir, is a four-mile long, man-made lake, along the course of Arm River. Arm Lake Dam (also known as Craik Dam) is about 1.6 kilometres (1 mi) north-east of Craik. At the southern end of the lake, by the dam, is a 26-acre regional park called Craik and District Regional Park. Along the west side of the park, at the west side of the dam, is Craik and District Golf Course.

The original dam across the river was built about 500 metres (1,600 ft) north of the current dam by the Canadian National Railway (CNR) in the early 1900s to supply water for the trains. By the 1950s, the dam had fallen into disrepair and held very little water. Between 1962 and 1963, the Prairie Farm Rehabilitation Administration built a new dam. It was turned over to the RM of Craik No. 222 in 1964.

== Arm River Recreation Site ==
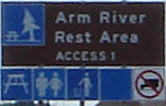
Arm River Recreation Site access sign along Highway 11 (c. 2007)

Arm River Recreation Site (50.8366°N 105.4431°W) is a picnic site in the Arm River Valley along Highway 2. It is located at a bend in the river about halfway between Chamberlain and Findlater in the RM of Sarnia No. 221. The picnic area is a day-use site with washrooms, picnic tables, parking, and access to Arm River for fishing.

== See also ==
- List of rivers of Saskatchewan
- List of lakes of Saskatchewan
- List of protected areas of Saskatchewan
- Dams and reservoirs in Saskatchewan
- Hudson Bay drainage basin
- Tourism in Saskatchewan
