= Kenaston, Saskatchewan =

Village in Saskatchewan, Canada

Kenaston
- Village
- Village of Kenaston
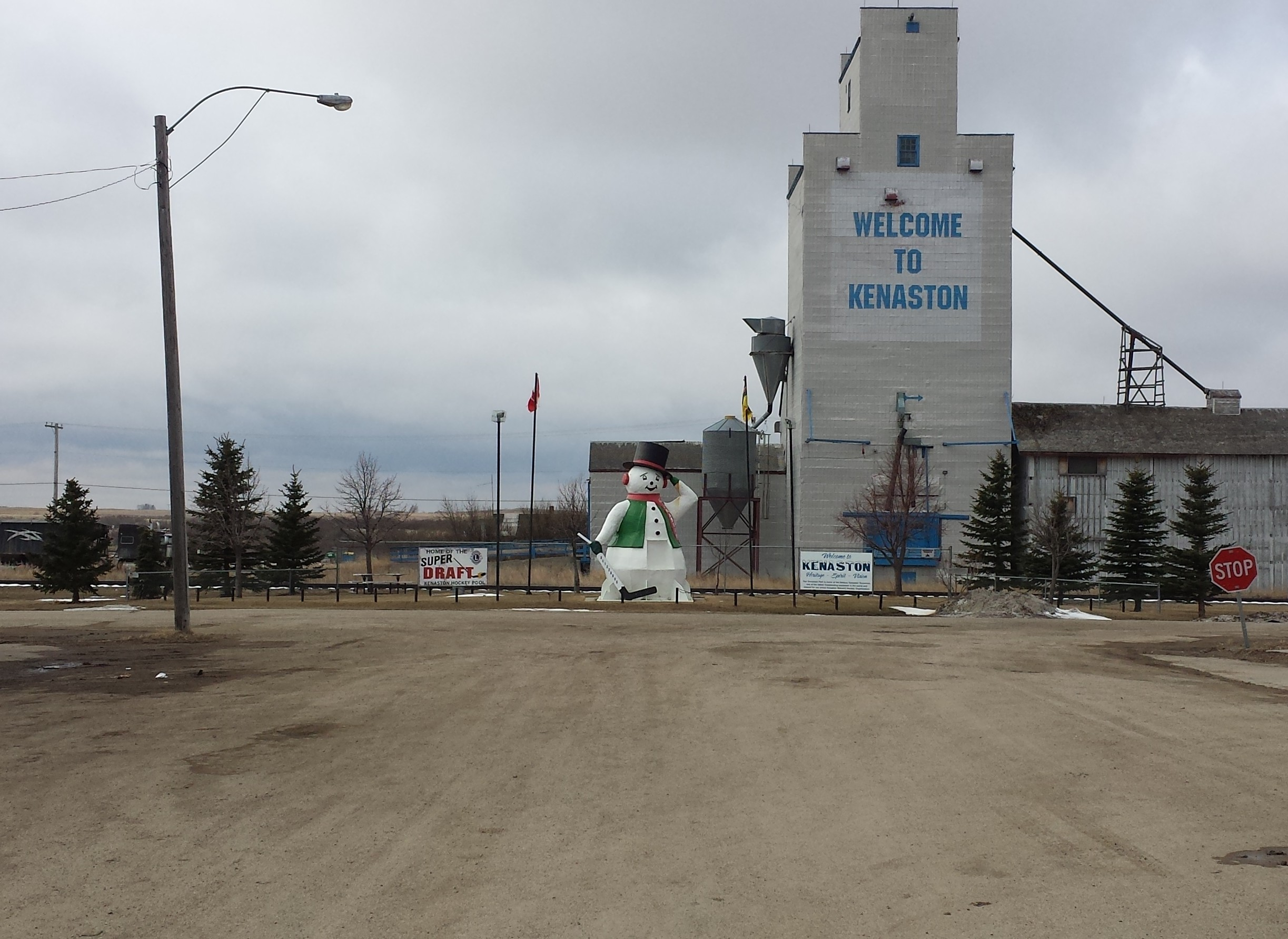
- Snowman and grain elevator in downtown Kenaston
- Motto(s): Heritage, Spirit, Vision
- Location of Kenaston in Saskatchewan Kenaston (Canada)
- Coordinates: 51°30′N 106°17′W
- Country: Canada
- Provinces and territories of Canada: Saskatchewan
- Census division: 11
- Rural Municipality: McCraney No. 282
- Settled: 1902
- Bonnington, NWT Post Office Founded: October 1, 1904
- Kenaston, SK Post office Founded: January 1, 1906

Government
  - Type: Municipal
  - Governing body: Kenaston Village Council
  - Mayor: Brad Owen
  - Administrator: Leah Evans

Area
  - Land: 1.17 km^{2} (0.45 sq mi)

Population (2016)
  - Total: 282
  - Density: 240.9/km^{2} (624/sq mi)
  - Summer (DST): UTC-6 (CST)
- Postal code: S0G 2N0
- Highways: Highway 11 / Highway 15
- Railways: Canadian National Railway; Last Mountain Railway
- Website: Official website

Kenaston (2016 population: 282) is a village in the Canadian province of Saskatchewan within the Rural Municipality of McCraney No. 282 and Census Division No. 11. Kenaston is located on Highway 11 (Louis Riel Trail) at the junction of Highway 15. This is a scenic area of Saskatchewan situated within the rolling Allan Hills. Kenaston is located between Danielson Provincial Park and Blackstrap Provincial Park.

== History ==
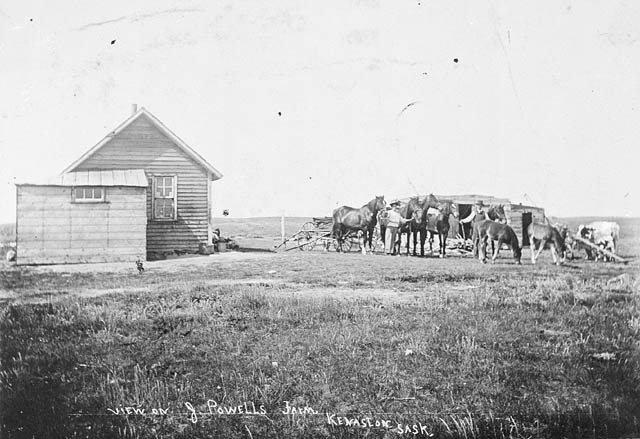
J. Powells Farm, Kenaston (1907)

First known as Bonnington Springs in the District of Assiniboia in the North-West Territories, the settlement was usually referred to as "Bonnington". In late 1905, when Saskatchewan became a province, the name was changed to "Kenaston", honouring F. E. Kenaston, who was the Vice President of the Saskatchewan Valley Land Company.

The railroad reached Bonnington in late 1889, but there is no record of any permanent residents until 1902. In that year the Saskatchewan Valley Land Company was formed made up of wealthy men from the United States. The president was Colonel Andrew Duncan Davidson and F. E. Kenaston was vice-president.

The Saskatchewan Valley Land Company purchased 839,000 acres (3,400 km^{2}) of land from the railway for $1.53 an acre and another 250,000 acres (1,000 km^{2}) from the Dominion Government for $1.00 an acre. By adopting unorthodox methods of advertising and employing dozens of land agents, the wide open spaces between Regina and Saskatoon were peopled with hundreds of settlers in the time between 1902 and 1910.

Needs of settlers created a necessity for business places and the settlement grew. Kenaston incorporated as a village on July 18, 1910. The Kenaston School opened its doors to its first fourteen pupils in August 1905, while the town was still officially known as Bonnington. The first store was built in 1903, the post office and hotel were established in 1904, the first telephone installed in 1909, and the first of Kenaston's grain elevator was built in 1906 by the Canadian Elevator Company. In 1910, the 40,000-gallon water tower was built by CNR in proximity to the train station and just across from the first hotel.

== Demographics ==
Population history (1981–2016)
Year	Pop.	±%
1981	345	—
1986	359	+4.1%
1991	309	−13.9%
1996	323	+4.5%
2001	282	−12.7%
2006	259	−8.2%
2011	285	+10.0%
2016	282	−1.1%
Source: Statistics Canada via Saskatchewan Bureau of Statistics

In the 2021 Census of Population conducted by Statistics Canada, Kenaston had a population of 292 living in 130 of its 153 total private dwellings, a change of 3.5% from its 2016 population of 282. With a land area of 1.14 km^{2} (0.44 sq mi), it had a population density of 256.1/km^{2} (663.4/sq mi) in 2021.

In the 2016 Census of Population, the Village of Kenaston recorded a population of 282 living in 126 of its 131 total private dwellings, a −1.1% change from its 2011 population of 285. With a land area of 1.17 km^{2} (0.45 sq mi), it had a population density of 241.0/km^{2} (624.3/sq mi) in 2016.

== Attractions ==
Kenaston hosts a sporting facility named Kenaston Place which brings to the village the event Super Draft. Kenaston Snowman Park is near the historic water tower restoration. Kenaston's large roadside attraction is a Snowman which is 18 feet (5.5 metres) in height and honours the nickname of Kenaston being the Blizzard capital of Saskatchewan. Bonnington Springs is the name of the campground at Kenaston. Kenaston Recreation Site is a conservation area near Kenaston.

== Education ==
Kenaston is part of the Sun West School Division. It is also home to the Distance Learning Centre which provides education to the province through online studies.

== Media ==
- The Davidson Leader is a newspaper which serves Kenaston.
- A piece from Chilly Gonzales' Solo Piano II is named "Kenaston".
- The book Kith 'n kin outlines the history of Kenaston and district.

== Transportation ==
Kenaston is at the crossroads of Highway 15 and Highway 11.

Canadian National Railway currently serves Kenaston; however the line terminates at Davidson where the Last Mountain Railway (Craik subdivision) begins and takes over the remainder of the line.

== Notable people ==
- Allan Kerpan is a politician born in Kenaston.
- Mike Prpich is a professional ice hockey player.
- Lynne Yelich (née Zdunich) is the Member of Parliament representing the federal riding of Blackstrap. She was raised in Kenaston and continues to call Kenaston home.

== See also ==
- List of communities in Saskatchewan
- List of villages in Saskatchewan
