= Matt Watkins =

Canadian ice hockey player

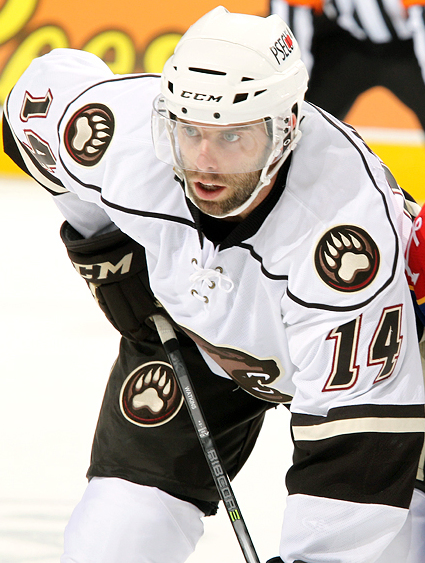
- Watkins with the Hershey Bears in 2013
- Born: November 22, 1986 (age 39) Aylesbury, Saskatchewan, Canada
- Height: 5 ft 10 in (178 cm)
- Weight: 185 lb (84 kg; 13 st 3 lb)
- Position: Right wing
- Shot: Left
- Played for: Phoenix Coyotes; Vienna Capitals; KooKoo
- NHL draft: 160th overall, 2005; Dallas Stars
- Playing career: 2009–2016

Matthew Watkins (born November 22, 1986) is a Canadian former professional ice hockey player who played a single game with the Phoenix Coyotes in the National Hockey League (NHL). He currently plays in the senior men's hockey in the WSHL with the Craik Warriors. He was selected by the Dallas Stars in the 5th round (160th overall) of the 2005 NHL entry draft. Watkins was born in Aylesbury, Saskatchewan, but grew up in Regina, Saskatchewan.

== Playing career ==
Watkins signed a one-year contract with the Phoenix Coyotes on July 6, 2011. He was assigned for the majority of the 2011–12 season to AHL affiliate, the Portland Pirates.

Watkins left the Coyotes as a free agent to sign a one-year contract with the New York Islanders on July 1, 2012. He spent the duration of the 2012–13 season with the Islanders AHL affiliate, the Bridgeport Sound Tigers, posting 30 points in 68 games.

On July 8, 2013, he signed a one-year, two way contract as a free agent with the Washington Capitals. For the duration of his contract with the Capitals, Watkins was assigned to AHL affiliate, the Hershey Bears posting 27 points in 73 games of the 2013–14 season.

On July 27, 2014, Watkins signed his first European contract in agreeing to a one-year deal with Austrian club, the Vienna Capitals of the EBEL. As an alternate captain in the 2014–15 season with the Capitals, Watkins contributed offensively with 12 goals and 32 points in 54 games.

On June 18, 2015, Watkin left after one season with the Capitals, to sign a one-year contract with newly promoted Finnish club, KooKoo of the Liiga.

== Career statistics ==
			Regular season					Playoffs
Season	Team	League	GP	G	A	Pts	PIM	GP	G	A	Pts	PIM
2002–03	Tisdale Trojans AAA	SMHL	40	25	26	51	26	—	—	—	—	—
2002–03	Humboldt Broncos	SJHL	2	0	1	1	0	—	—	—	—	—
2003–04	Tisdale Trojans AAA	SMHL	44	34	37	71	52	—	—	—	—	—
2004–05	Vernon Vipers	BCHL	60	36	38	74	53	14	4	6	10	6
2005–06	University of North Dakota	WCHA	46	5	4	9	45	—	—	—	—	—
2006–07	University of North Dakota	WCHA	38	6	11	17	31	—	—	—	—	—
2007–08	University of North Dakota	WCHA	43	8	10	18	34	—	—	—	—	—
2008–09	University of North Dakota	WCHA	41	7	7	14	40	—	—	—	—	—
2009–10	Las Vegas Wranglers	ECHL	14	4	7	11	12	—	—	—	—	—
2009–10	San Antonio Rampage	AHL	51	12	10	22	17	—	—	—	—	—
2010–11	San Antonio Rampage	AHL	64	15	20	35	45	—	—	—	—	—
2011–12	Portland Pirates	AHL	70	11	25	36	48	—	—	—	—	—
2011–12	Phoenix Coyotes	NHL	1	0	0	0	0	—	—	—	—	—
2012–13	Bridgeport Sound Tigers	AHL	68	11	19	30	43	—	—	—	—	—
2013–14	Hershey Bears	AHL	73	10	17	27	37	—	—	—	—	—
2014–15	Vienna Capitals	AUT	54	12	20	32	50	15	5	6	11	12
2015–16	KooKoo	Liiga	58	2	10	12	57	—	—	—	—	—
2016–17	Craik Warriors	WSHL	18	16	28	44	24	11	7	17	24	20
2017–18	Craik Warriors	WSHL	19	23	29	52	18	—	—	—	—	—
2018–19	Craik Warriors	WSHL	8	8	15	23	15	7	8	10	18	4
2019–20	Craik Warriors	WSHL	4	5	9	14	17	4	3	6	9	2
2020–21	Craik Warriors	WSHL	1	0	3	3	0	—	—	—	—	—
2021–22	Craik Warriors	WSHL	7	11	15	26	19	4	4	7	11	0
AHL totals			326	59	91	150	190	—	—	—	—	—
NHL totals			1	0	0	0	0	—	—	—	—	—
