= Lovering Lakes =

Lake in Saskatchewan, Canada

- Location in Saskatchewan Lovering Lakes (Canada)
- Location: RM of Craik No. 222 and RM of Sarnia No. 221, Saskatchewan
- Coordinates: 50.8445°N 105.6106°W
- Type: Endorheic lake
- Part of: Red River drainage basin
- Primary outflows: None
- Basin countries: Canada
- Surface area: 90.3 ha (223 acres)
- Shore length^{1}: 10 km (6.2 mi)
- Surface elevation: 584 m (1,916 ft)
- Settlements: None
- ^{1} Shore length is not a well-defined measure.

The Lovering Lakes are two small lakes in the Canadian province of Saskatchewan. The eastern part of the eastern most lake is in the Rural Municipality of Sarnia No. 221 while the remainder is in the Rural Municipality of Craik No. 222. The western most section of the lakes is a provincial recreation site and on the southern shore, adjacent to the recreation site, is a small cottage community. The lakes are 3.4 kilometres (2.1 mi) west-southwest of Chamberlain and access is from a gravel road off Highway 733.

== Lovering Lake Recreation Site ==
Lovering Lake Recreation Site (50.8420°N 105.6266°W) is a provincial recreation site on the shores of the Lovering Lakes. The park has a beach and a boat launch.

== Fish species ==
Fish commonly found in the Lovering Lakes include burbot, northern pike, and stocked walleye. The lakes are regularly stocked with smallmouth bass and walleye.

== See also ==
- List of lakes of Saskatchewan
- Tourism in Saskatchewan
