= Qu'Appelle, Long Lake and Saskatchewan Railroad and Steamboat Company =

Overview
- Reporting mark: QLSRSC
- Locale: Saskatchewan
- Dates of operation: 1885–1906
- Successor: Canadian Northern Railway

Technical
- Track gauge: 4 ft 8 1/2 in (1,435 mm) standard gauge

The Qu'Appelle, Long Lake and Saskatchewan Railroad and Steamboat Company (QLSRSC) was a railway that operated between Regina, Saskatchewan and Prince Albert, Saskatchewan, Canada via Craik, Saskatoon and Rosthern.

Augustus Meredith Nanton was an earlier financier who helped raise the funds to establish the railway. Construction began on the line 1883 but ran into financial problems. By 1886, only 25 miles (40 km) had been built, and the line was not finished until 1889.

Work on the first branch line of the QLSRSC began in 1885, from Regina to Craven, Saskatchewan. This permitted the settlement of the area, resulting in the creation of communities as Sunset Cove. The Regina-Prince Albert line was constructed by 1889 and 1890.

In 1889, the company's railways were leased to the Canadian Pacific Railway and finally taken over by the Canadian Northern Railway in July 1906. The railway also operated steamboats on Last Mountain Lake. Through its land holding company, the railway sold off its 1,000,000 acres (400,000 ha) of farmland to early settlers.

== See also ==
- Last Mountain Railway
