= Bladworth =

Village in Saskatchewan, Canada

- Village
- Village of Bladworth
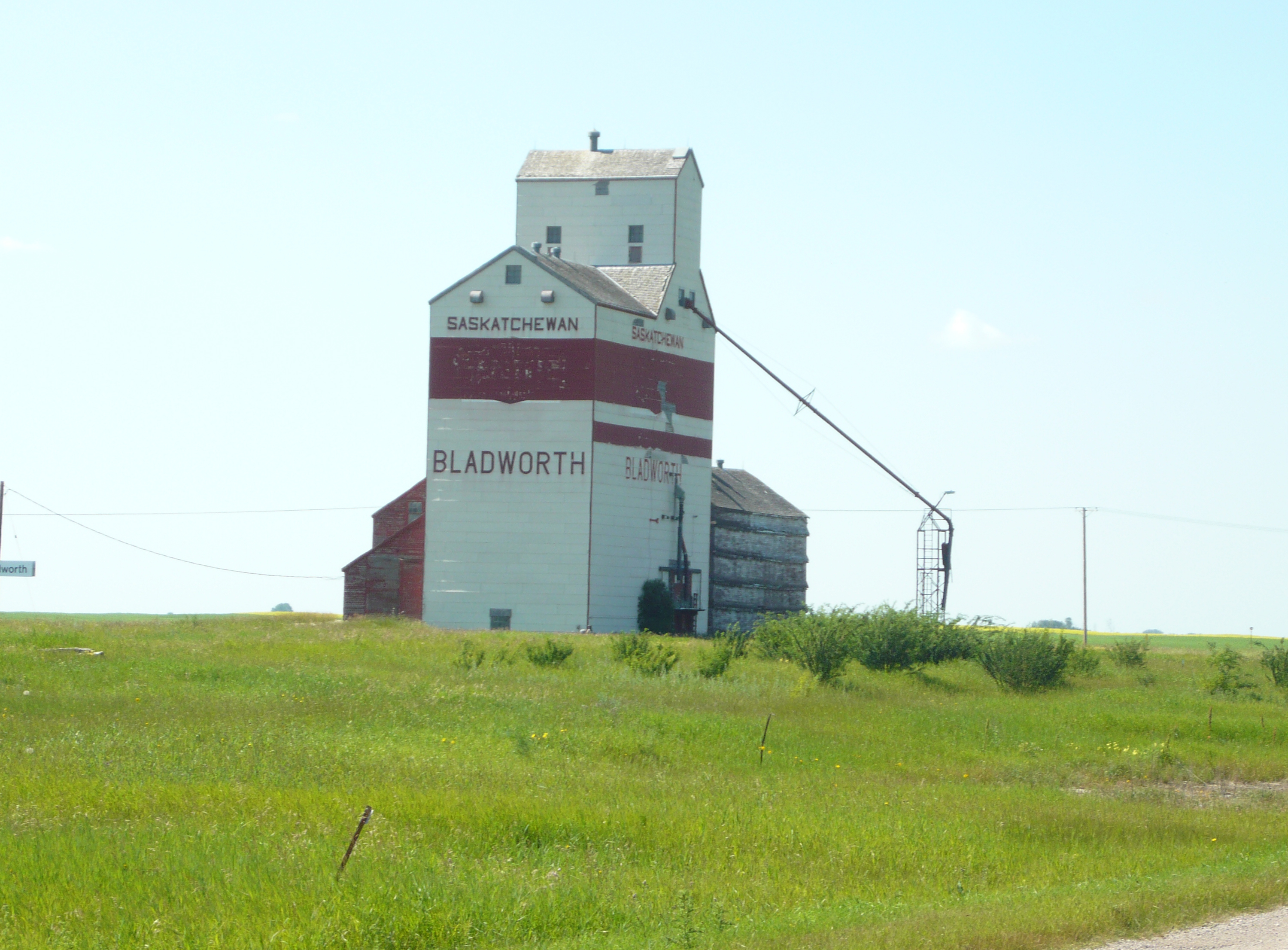
- Grain elevator in Bladworth

- Location of Bladworth in Saskatchewan Bladworth (Canada)
- Coordinates: 51.366°N 106.138°W
- Country: Canada
- Province: Saskatchewan
- Region: Central
- Census division: 11
- Rural Municipality: McCraney No. 282

Government
  - Mayor: Ron Bessey
  - Administrator: Donna Bessey
  - Governing body: Bladworth Village Council

Area
  - Total: 0.84 km^{2} (0.32 sq mi)

Population (2011)
  - Total: 60
  - Density: 71.2/km^{2} (184/sq mi)
- Time zone: UTC-6 (CST)
- Postal code: S0G 0L0
- Area code: 306
- Highways: Highway 11

Bladworth (2016 population: 65) is a village in the Canadian province of Saskatchewan within the Rural Municipality of McCraney No. 282 and Census Division No. 11. The village is located 99 kilometres (62 mi) south of the city of Saskatoon on Highway 11.

== History ==
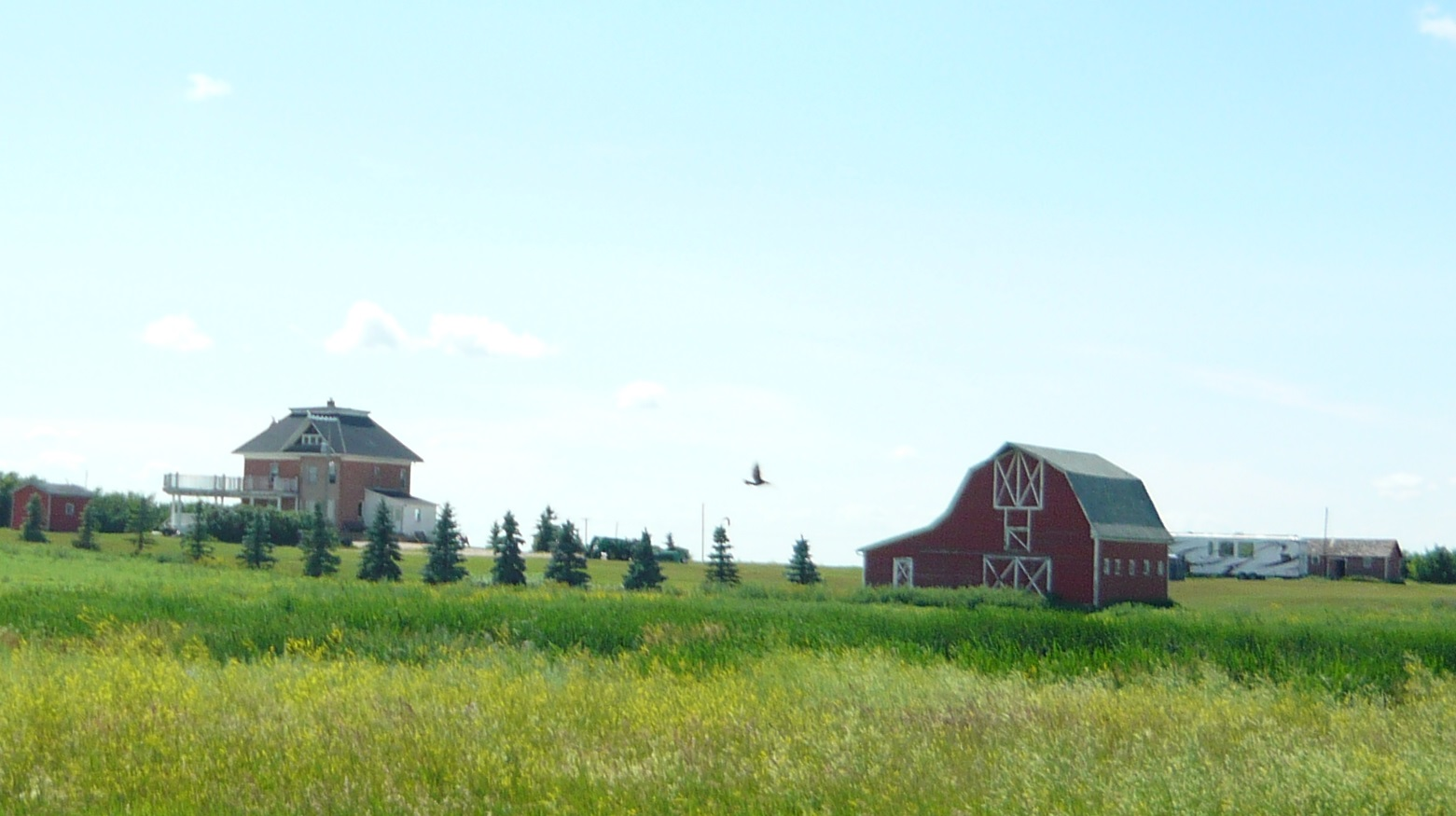
Johnston House (circa 1911)

Bladworth incorporated as a village on July 27, 1906.

Heritage properties

Bladworth is the site of a Saskatchewan Municipal Heritage property, a two-story brick house clearly visible from adjacent Highway 11. The J. Fred Johnston house is named for its builder, a Saskatchewan entrepreneur, Liberal Member of Parliament and later a Senator, from 1943 to 1948.

== Demographics ==
Population history (1981–2016)
Year	Pop.	±%
1981	124	—
1986	120	−3.2%
1991	111	−7.5%
1996	76	−31.5%
2001	67	−11.8%
2006	70	+4.5%
2011	60	−14.3%
2016	65	+8.3%
Source: Statistics Canada via Saskatchewan Bureau of Statistics

In the 2021 Census of Population conducted by Statistics Canada, Bladworth had a population of 71 living in 28 of its 36 total private dwellings, a change of 9.2% from its 2016 population of 65. With a land area of 0.87 km^{2} (0.34 sq mi), it had a population density of 81.6/km^{2} (211.4/sq mi) in 2021.

In the 2016 Census of Population, the Village of Bladworth recorded a population of 65 living in 29 of its 38 total private dwellings, a 7.7% change from its 2011 population of 60. With a land area of 0.84 km^{2} (0.32 sq mi), it had a population density of 77.4/km^{2} (200.4/sq mi) in 2016.

== Notable people ==
- Greg Brkich (born 1958), politician
- Gordon Stewart Northcott (1906–1930), serial killer and rapist
- Rod Sarich (born 1981), ice hockey player

== See also ==
- Wineville Chicken Coop Murders
- List of communities in Saskatchewan
- List of villages in Saskatchewan
