= Kedleston Beach =

Hamlet in Saskatchewan, Canada

Coordinates: 50.490°N 105.040°W

Location of Kedleston Beach in Saskatchewan

Kedleston Beach is a hamlet in south-central Saskatchewan, Canada. Located along the southwestern coastline of Last Mountain Lake, it lies within the Rural Municipality of Dufferin No. 190 and is connected to Highway 354 via Moorland Road.

== See also ==
- List of communities in Saskatchewan
