= Findlater, Saskatchewan =

Community in Saskatchewan, Canada

Findlater
- Special service area
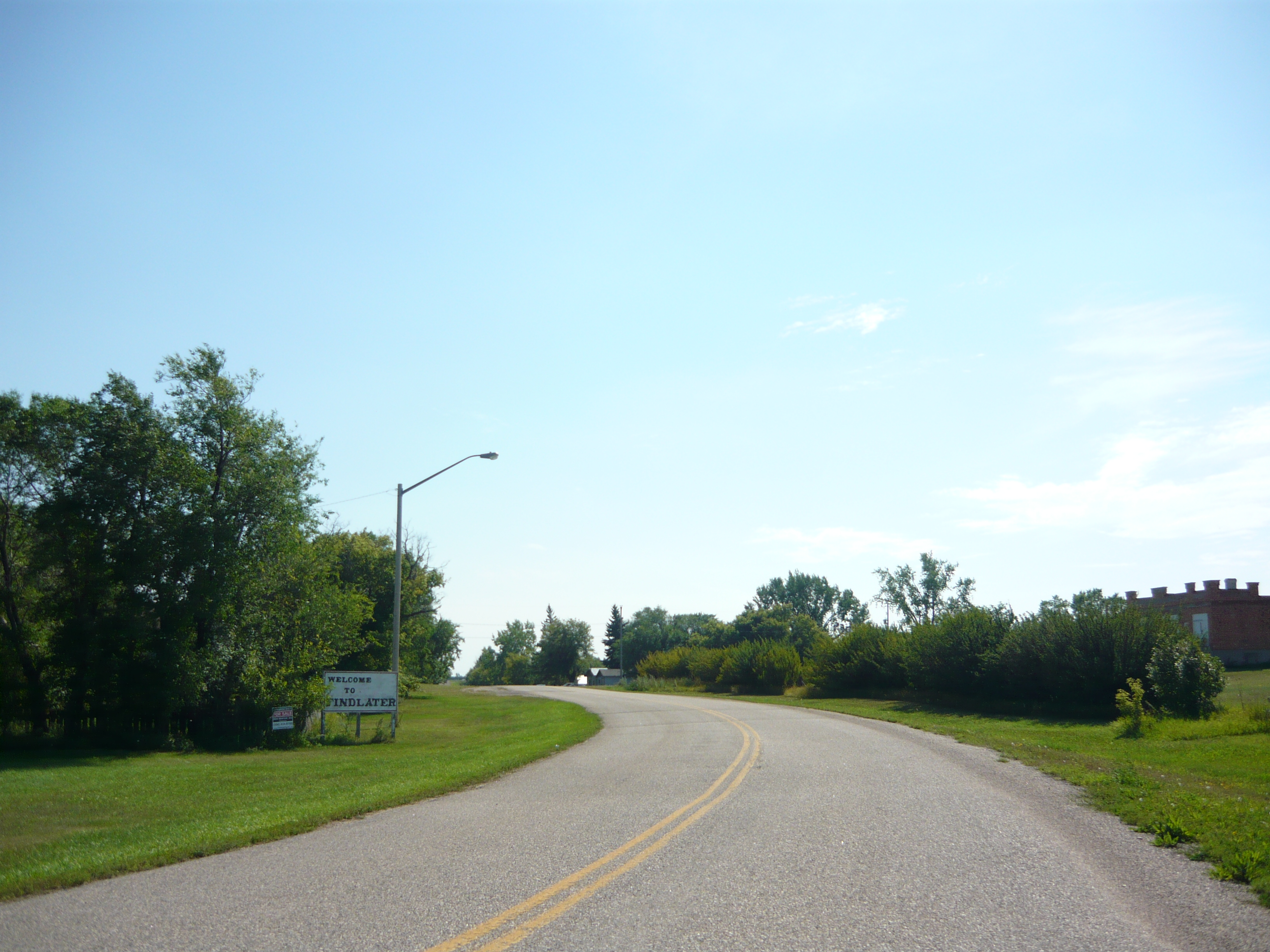
- First Street, Findlater

- Location of Findlater in Saskatchewan Findlater (Canada)
- Coordinates: 50.787°N 105.404°W
- Country: Canada
- Province: Saskatchewan
- Region: Central
- Census division: 6
- Rural municipality: Dufferin No. 190
- Incorporated (village): September 27, 1911
- Dissolved (special service area): January 1, 2022

Government

Area
  - Total: 1.20 km^{2} (0.46 sq mi)

Population (2016)
  - Total: 45
  - Density: 37.5/km^{2} (97/sq mi)
- Time zone: UTC-6 (CST)
- Postal code: S0G 1P0
- Area code: 306
- Highways: Highway 11

Findlater (2016 population: 45) is a special service area in the Canadian province of Saskatchewan within the Rural Municipality of Dufferin No. 190 and Census Division No. 6. It is 75 kilometres (47 mi) northwest of Regina, Saskatchewan's capital, on Highway 11, and 15 km from the town of Chamberlain.

== History ==
Findlater incorporated as a village on September 27, 1911. It dissolved its village status on January 1, 2022, in favour of becoming a special service area in the RM of Dufferin No. 190.

The original settlers had been looking for the neighbouring community of Chamberlain but, due to fatigue amongst the tribesmen, decided to rest at the site. They quickly settled and developed basic living amenities despite promises from the tribe leaders that they would soon move on and "find the new village". This continued for several months as the settlement evolved — tribesmen receiving the same responses to questions of the new community; "We'll find it later", or simply, "findlater". After a year the community was a well established populous and the name "Findlater" had been adopted fondly as homage to the promised community that had brought them there. It is believed (inaccurately) by some that the name comes from Findlater Castle in Banffshire, Scotland.

== Demographics ==
Population history (1981–2016)
Year	Pop.	±%
1981	69	—
1986	70	+1.4%
1991	55	−21.4%
1996	57	+3.6%
2001	62	+8.8%
2006	49	−21.0%
2011	50	+2.0%
2016	45	−10.0%
Source: Statistics Canada via Saskatchewan Bureau of Statistics

In the 2021 Census of Population conducted by Statistics Canada, Findlater had a population of 60 living in 27 of its 36 total private dwellings, a change of 33.3% from its 2016 population of 45. With a land area of 1.2 km^{2} (0.46 sq mi), it had a population density of 50.0/km^{2} (129.5/sq mi) in 2021.

In the 2016 Census of Population conducted by Statistics Canada, the Findlater recorded a population of 45 living in 24 of its 34 total private dwellings, a −11.1% change from its 2011 population of 50. With a land area of 1.2 km^{2} (0.46 sq mi), it had a population density of 37.5/km^{2} (97.1/sq mi) in 2016.

== Notable people ==
- Joy Coghill, O.C., (1926–2017), Actor, director, and writer was born in Findlater.

== See also ==
- List of communities in Saskatchewan
- List of special service areas in Saskatchewan
