= Bethune, Saskatchewan =

Village in Saskatchewan, Canada

Bethune
- Village
- Village of Bethune
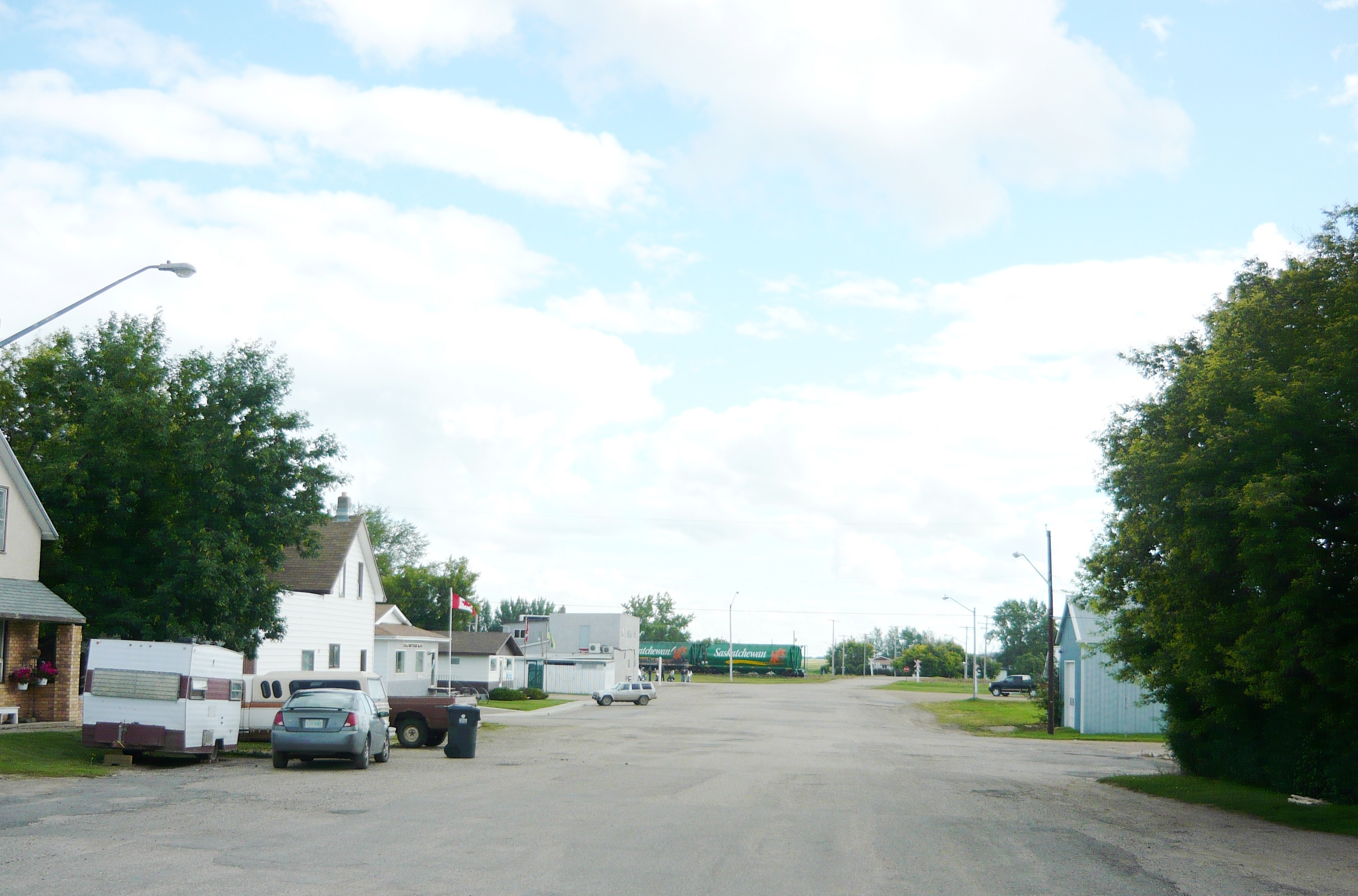
- Main Street Bethune

- Location of Bethune in Saskatchewan Bethune (Canada)
- Coordinates: 50°43′N 105°13′W
- Country: Canada
- Province: Saskatchewan
- Region: Southwest
- Census division: 6
- Rural municipality: Dufferin No. 190
- Post office Founded: 1905-06-05
- Incorporated (Village): 1912

Government
  - Type: Municipal
  - Governing body: Bethune Village Council
  - Mayor: Christoper Lloyd
  - Administrator: Rodney Audette

Area
  - Total: 1.04 km^{2} (0.40 sq mi)

Population (2016)
  - Total: 399
  - Density: 383.1/km^{2} (992/sq mi)
- Time zone: UTC-6 (Central)
- Postal code: S0G 0H0
- Area code: 306
- Highways: Highway 11; Highway 642; Highway 739
- Website: www.villageofbethune.com

Bethune /ˈbɛθ.juːn/ (2016 population: 399) is a village in the Canadian province of Saskatchewan within the Rural Municipality of Dufferin No. 190 and Census Division No. 6. The village is 56 kilometres (35 mi) north-west of Regina on Highway 11 (the Louis Riel Trail). Arm River flows along a river valley north of Bethune, which features camping sites.

The post office of Bethune, Assiniboia, NWT was established on 5 June 1905, three months before Saskatchewan became a province.

== History ==
Bethune incorporated as a village on 2 August 1912. The village takes its name from C.B. Bethune, the engineer on the first train to travel the railway in 1887.

== Demographics ==
Population history (1981–2016)
Year	Pop.	±%
1981	369	—
1986	373	+1.1%
1991	369	−1.1%
1996	375	+1.6%
2001	380	+1.3%
2006	369	−2.9%
2011	400	+8.4%
2016	399	−0.2%
Source: Statistics Canada via Saskatchewan Bureau of Statistics

In the 2021 Census of Population conducted by Statistics Canada, Bethune had a population of 560 living in 180 of its 189 total private dwellings, a change of 40.4% from its 2016 population of 399. With a land area of 2.38 km^{2} (0.92 sq mi), it had a population density of 235.3/km^{2} (609.4/sq mi) in 2021.

In the 2016 Census of Population, the Village of Bethune recorded a population of 399 living in 158 of its 181 total private dwellings, a −1.5% change from its 2011 population of 405. With a land area of 2.38 km^{2} (0.92 sq mi), it had a population density of 167.6/km^{2} (434.2/sq mi) in 2016.

CXBE weather radar from the Canadian weather radar network, 19 km (12 mi) south of the village

== Attractions ==
Bethune has a skating rink, curling rink, park, school, and baseball diamonds located on the outskirts of town at McLean Park. It has a playground splash pad and four baseball diamonds. Bethune is home to the Bethune Bulldogs of the senior men's Highway Hockey League.

The Gillis Blakley Bethune and District Heritage Museum is a Municipal Heritage Property on the Canadian Register of Historic Places.

Nearby attractions include Buffalo Pound Provincial Park, Grandview Beach, Kedleston Beach, and Regina Beach Recreation Site.

== See also ==
- List of villages in Saskatchewan
- List of communities in Saskatchewan
