= Aylesbury, Saskatchewan =

Village in Saskatchewan, Canada

Aylesbury
- Village
- Village of Aylesbury
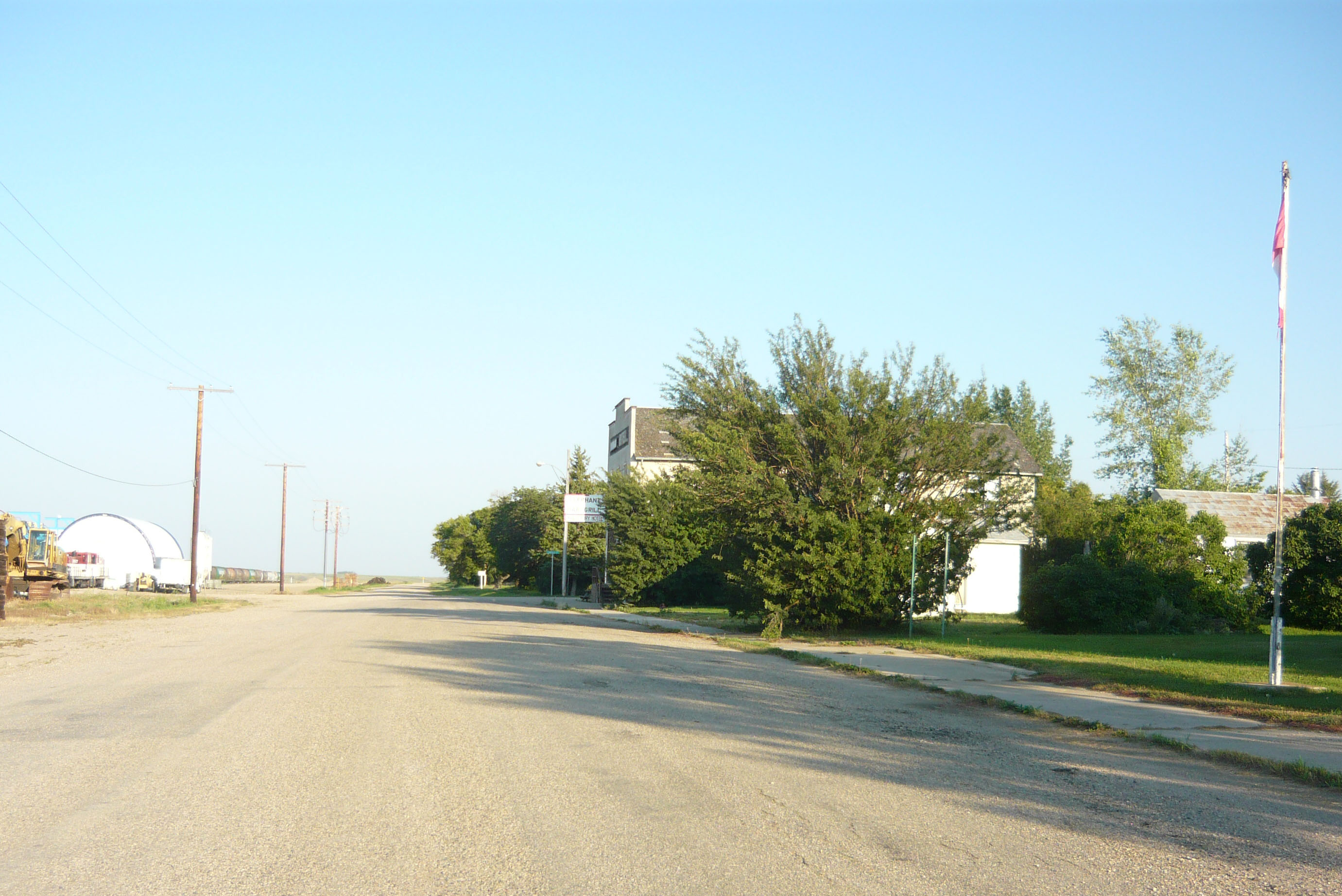
- Main Street in Aylesbury

- Location within Saskatchewan Location within Canada
- Coordinates: 50.939°N 105.694°W
- Country: Canada
- Province: Saskatchewan
- Region: South-central
- Census division: 17
- Rural Municipality: Craik No. 222
- Post office founded: 1905
- Incorporated (Village): N/A
- Incorporated (Town): 1910

Government
  - Type: Aylesbury Village Council
  - Mayor: Nigel McAlpine

Area
  - Total: 1.28 km^{2} (0.49 sq mi)

Population (2011)
  - Total: 42
  - Density: 32.81/km^{2} (85.0/sq mi)
- Time zone: CST
- Postal code: S0G 0B0
- Area code: 306
- Highways: Highway 11
- Waterways: Last Mountain Lake

Aylesbury (2016 population: 40) is a village in the Canadian province of Saskatchewan within the Rural Municipality of Craik No. 222 and Census Division No. 7. The village is approximately 60 km north of the city of Moose Jaw.

== History ==
Aylesbury incorporated as a village on March 31, 1910. The village was named after Aylesbury, a town in Buckinghamshire, England.

A Parrish & Heimbecker grain elevator was constructed in 1906 and was the last elevator to operate in Aylesbury, up until the mid-1990s. It was demolished in October 2009.

Aylesbury School opened in 1909; in 1970 the school closed and its students were sent to the school in nearby Craik.

In the 1980s, Aylesbury received national media attention when residents rallied in an (ultimately unsuccessful) attempt to convince Canada Post not to close the village's post office. Today, the Canada Post service is contracted to the Aylesbury Hotel.

Aylesbury was the childhood home of Ashley Luther, who modelled and advocated for women's health as Elly Mayday.

As part of a series of monuments in towns along Highway 11, a life-size ox and cart was erected outside Aylesbury in 1999. It was created by Don Wilkins, who also created metal sculptures for the neighbouring towns of Craik and Girvin.

== Demographics ==
Population history (1981–2016)
Year	Pop.	±%
1981	62	—
1986	74	+19.4%
1991	63	−14.9%
1996	59	−6.3%
2001	50	−15.3%
2006	45	−10.0%
2011	42	−6.7%
2016	40	−4.8%
Source: Statistics Canada via Saskatchewan Bureau of Statistics

In the 2021 Census of Population conducted by Statistics Canada, Aylesbury had a population of 67 living in 28 of its 38 total private dwellings, a change of 67.5% from its 2016 population of 40. With a land area of 1.31 km^{2} (0.51 sq mi), it had a population density of 51.1/km^{2} (132.5/sq mi) in 2021.

In the 2016 Census of Population, the Village of Aylesbury recorded a population of 40 living in 22 of its 30 total private dwellings, a −5% change from its 2011 population of 42. With a land area of 1.28 km^{2} (0.49 sq mi), it had a population density of 31.3/km^{2} (80.9/sq mi) in 2016.

== See also ==
- List of communities in Saskatchewan
- List of villages in Saskatchewan
