= Holdfast, Saskatchewan =

Village in Saskatchewan, Canada

Holdfast
- Village
- Village of Holdfast
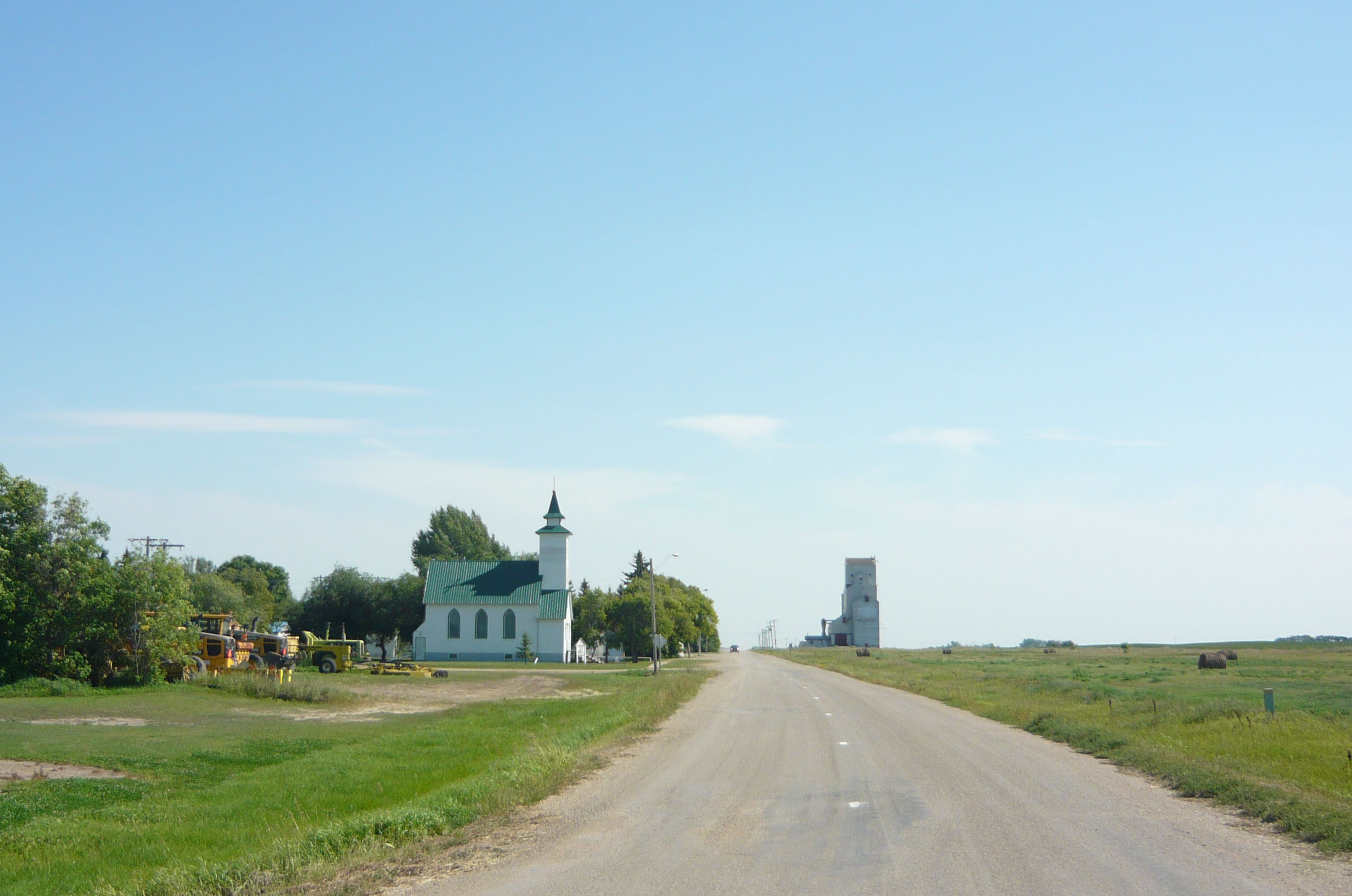
- Railway Avenue in Holdfast

- Location of Holdfast in Saskatchewan Holdfast (Canada)
- Coordinates: 50.963°N 105.405°W
- Country: Canada
- Province: Saskatchewan
- Region: Central
- Census division: 6
- Rural municipality: Sarnia No. 221
- Post office Founded: 1911

Government
  - Governing body: Holdfast Village Council
  - Mayor: Chris Thorson
  - Administrator: Donna Flavel

Area
  - Total: 1.29 km^{2} (0.50 sq mi)

Population (2016)
  - Total: 247
  - Density: 191.1/km^{2} (495/sq mi)
- Time zone: UTC-6 (CST)
- Postal code: S0G 2H0
- Area code: 306
- Highways: Highway 2 / Highway 732
- Railways: Abandoned

Holdfast (2016 population: 247) is a village in the Canadian province of Saskatchewan within the Rural Municipality of Sarnia No. 221 and Census Division No. 6. The village is located 2 kilometres (1.2 mi) east of Highway 2 on Highway 732, about 98 kilometres (61 mi) northwest of the city of Regina.

== History ==
Holdfast incorporated as a village on October 5, 1911.

== Demographics ==
Population history (1981–2016)
Year	Pop.	±%
1981	297	—
1986	242	−18.5%
1991	239	−1.2%
1996	216	−9.6%
2001	190	−12.0%
2006	173	−8.9%
2011	169	−2.3%
2016	247	+46.2%
Source: Statistics Canada via Saskatchewan Bureau of Statistics

In the 2021 Census of Population conducted by Statistics Canada, Holdfast had a population of 173 living in 78 of its 92 total private dwellings, a change of −30% from its 2016 population of 247. With a land area of 1.32 km^{2} (0.51 sq mi), it had a population density of 131.1/km^{2} (339.4/sq mi) in 2021.

In the 2016 Census of Population, the Village of Holdfast recorded a population of 247 living in 107 of its 136 total private dwellings, a 31.6% change from its 2011 population of 169. With a land area of 1.29 km^{2} (0.50 sq mi), it had a population density of 191.5/km^{2} (495.9/sq mi) in 2016.

== Public Services ==
- Village of Holdfast Office
- Rural Municipality of Sarnia No. 221 Office
- Holdfast Fire Hall
- Holdfast Post office
- Holdfast & District Public Library
- Holdfast Parks-And-Rec Committee
- Schell School
- Sarnia Community Complex

== See also ==
- List of communities in Saskatchewan
- List of villages in Saskatchewan
