= Sarnia Beach, Saskatchewan =

Community in Saskatchewan, Canada

Coordinates: 50°59′46″N 105°13′30″W

Sarnia Beach is a hamlet within the Rural Municipality of Sarnia No. 221 in the province of Saskatchewan, Canada. Located along the western shore of Last Mountain Lake, road access is from Highway 732, connected via Range Road 2241.

== Demographics ==
In the 2021 Census of Population conducted by Statistics Canada, Sarnia Beach had a population of 37 living in 18 of its 54 total private dwellings, a change of 146.7% from its 2016 population of 15. With a land area of 0.16 km^{2} (0.062 sq mi), it had a population density of 231.3/km^{2} (598.9/sq mi) in 2021.

== See also ==
- List of communities in Saskatchewan
