= Rural Municipality of McCraney No. 282 =

Rural municipality in Saskatchewan, Canada

McCraney No. 282
- Rural municipality
- Rural Municipality of McCraney No. 282
- Location of the RM of McCraney No. 282 in Saskatchewan
- Coordinates: 51.495°N 106.082°W
- Country: Canada
- Province: Saskatchewan
- Census division: 11
- SARM division: 5
- Formed: December 13, 1909

Government
  - Reeve: Murray Kadlec
  - Governing body: RM of McCraney No. 282 Council
  - Administrator: Jacklyn Zdunich
  - Office location: Kenaston

Area (2016)
  - Land: 948.55 km^{2} (366.24 sq mi)

Population (2016)
  - Total: 310
  - Density: 0.3/km^{2} (0.78/sq mi)
- Time zone: CST
  - Summer (DST): CST
- Postal code: S0G 2N0
- Area codes: 306 and 639

The Rural Municipality of McCraney No. 282 (2016 population: 310) is a rural municipality (RM) in the Canadian province of Saskatchewan within Census Division No. 11 and SARM Division No. 5. It is located in the south-central portion of the province.

== History ==
The RM of McCraney No. 282 incorporated as a rural municipality on December 13, 1909.

== Geography ==
Notable geographical features in the RM include the Allan Hills, Arm River, and Vanzance Lake.

=== Communities and localities ===
The following urban municipalities are surrounded by the RM.

Villages

- Kenaston
- Bladworth

The following unincorporated communities are within the RM.

Localities

- Farrerdale
- Smales

== Demographics ==
Population history (1981–2016)
Year	Pop.	±%
1981	600	—
1986	588	−2.0%
1991	513	−12.8%
1996	478	−6.8%
2001	431	−9.8%
2006	346	−19.7%
2011	307	−11.3%
2016	310	+1.0%
Source: Statistics Canada via Saskatchewan Bureau of Statistics

In the 2021 Census of Population conducted by Statistics Canada, the RM of McCraney No. 282 had a population of 280 living in 114 of its 136 total private dwellings, a change of −9.7% from its 2016 population of 310. With a land area of 944.47 km^{2} (364.66 sq mi), it had a population density of 0.3/km^{2} (0.8/sq mi) in 2021.

In the 2016 Census of Population, the RM of McCraney No. 282 recorded a population of 310 living in 127 of its 133 total private dwellings, a 1% change from its 2011 population of 307. With a land area of 948.55 km^{2} (366.24 sq mi), it had a population density of 0.3/km^{2} (0.8/sq mi) in 2016.

== Government ==
The RM of McCraney No. 282 is governed by an elected municipal council and an appointed administrator that meets on the third Thursday of every month. The reeve of the RM is Murray Kadlec while its administrator is Jacklyn Zdunich. The RM's office is located in Kenaston.

== See also ==
- List of rural municipalities in Saskatchewan
- List of communities in Saskatchewan
