= CFD Dundurn =

Canadian Forces facility in Saskatchewan

Coordinates: 51.849°N 106.563°W

Canadian Forces Detachment Dundurn (also CFD Dundurn) is a Canadian Forces facility located near the town of Dundurn, Saskatchewan, and approximately 40 km south of Saskatoon, Saskatchewan, along the east bank of Brightwater Creek.

== Camp Dundurn ==
In 1858 the area that now forms Camp Dundurn was used as a camping grounds for Metis hunters. Much of the early construction work was done in the 1930s as an Unemployment Relief Camp that was set up to build the base facilities. This included the construction of an airstrip and 45 permanent buildings along with roads, railway spurs and several bridges.

The area was used by Canadian Army units as early as 1928 when it was organized as Dundurn Military Camp (also Camp Dundurn). During World War II the Royal Canadian Air Force constructed a bombing range on the base and the Canadian Women's Army Corps established one of its first units at Camp Dundurn. The A27 Canadian Armoured Corps Training Centre (A27 CACTC) moved to Camp Dundurn from Camp Borden on January 28, 1942. A27 CACTC was later renamed A27 Canadian Reconnaissance Training Centre (A27 CRTC) and it remained on the base until March 1945. During World War II over 50,000 soldiers trained at Camp Dundurn before being assigned to duty overseas. Following the war, Camp Dundurn remained open as a military facility and it was used as a transit hub and holding area for troops returning from the war.

In 1947, the No. 6 Ordnance Ammunition Depot opened and permanent married quarters (PMQs) were constructed for personnel and their families. Military consolidation during the 1960s in the lead-up to unification of the Canadian Forces in 1968 saw Camp Dundurn made a detachment of CFB Moose Jaw in 1966 for administrative purposes.

In 1988, administrative control of CFD Dundurn was reallocated to CFB Winnipeg's 17 Wing.

== Canadian Forces Ammunition Depot - Dundurn ==
In 1947, No. 6 Ordnance Ammunition Depot an ammunition storage facility was established at Camp Dundurn. Following unification of the Royal Canadian Navy, Royal Canadian Air Force and Canadian Army in 1968, No. 6 Ordnance Ammunition Depot was renamed Canadian Forces Ammunition Depot Dundurn (also CFAD Dundurn). CFAD Dundurn is classified as a lodger unit at CFD Dundurn.

Today, CFAD Dundurn continues to function as an ammunition depot. CFAD Dundurn is the largest ammunition storage facility in the Canadian Forces, acting as the distribution centre for both domestic and overseas deployments.
