= Dilke, Saskatchewan =

Village in Saskatchewan, Canada

Dilke
- Village
- Village of Dilke
- Location of Dilke in Saskatchewan Dilke (Canada)
- Coordinates: 50°51′59″N 105°15′6″W
- Country: Canada
- Province: Saskatchewan
- Region: Southeast
- Census division: 6
- Rural municipality: Sarnia No. 221

Government
  - Type: Municipal
  - Governing body: Dilke Village Council
  - Mayor: Vern Chipiska
  - Administrator: Colleen R. Duesing

Area
  - Total: 1.28 km^{2} (0.49 sq mi)

Population (2016)
  - Total: 98
  - Density: 76.6/km^{2} (198/sq mi)
- Time zone: UTC-6 (CST)
- Postal code: S0G 1C0
- Area code: 306
- Highways: Highway 354 Highway 732 Highway 733

Dilke (2016 population: 98) is a village in the Canadian province of Saskatchewan within the Rural Municipality of Sarnia No. 221 and Census Division No. 6.

== History ==
Dilke incorporated as a village on December 30, 1912.

== Demographics ==
Population history (1981–2016)
Year	Pop.	±%
1981	115	—
1986	113	−1.7%
1991	98	−13.3%
1996	85	−13.3%
2001	70	−17.6%
2006	80	+14.3%
2011	77	−3.7%
2016	98	+27.3%
Source: Statistics Canada via Saskatchewan Bureau of Statistics

In the 2021 Census of Population conducted by Statistics Canada, Dilke had a population of 60 living in 33 of its 44 total private dwellings, a change of −38.8% from its 2016 population of 98. With a land area of 1.28 km^{2} (0.49 sq mi), it had a population density of 46.9/km^{2} (121.4/sq mi) in 2021.

In the 2016 Census of Population, the Village of Dilke recorded a population of 98 living in 57 of its 107 total private dwellings, a 21.4% change from its 2011 population of 77. With a land area of 1.28 km^{2} (0.49 sq mi), it had a population density of 76.6/km^{2} (198.3/sq mi) in 2016.

== See also ==
- List of communities in Saskatchewan
- List of villages in Saskatchewan
