= Rural Municipality of Sarnia No. 221 =

Rural municipality in Saskatchewan, Canada

Sarnia No. 221
- Rural municipality
- Rural Municipality of Sarnia No. 221
- Location of the RM of Sarnia No. 221 in Saskatchewan
- Coordinates: 50.937°N 105.190°W
- Country: Canada
- Province: Saskatchewan
- Census division: 6
- SARM division: 2
- Formed: December 13, 1909

Government
  - Reeve: Carl Erlandson
  - Governing body: RM of Sarnia No. 221 Council
  - Administrator: Patti Vance
  - Office location: Holdfast

Area (2016)
  - Land: 870.73 km^{2} (336.19 sq mi)

Population (2016)
  - Total: 322
  - Density: 0.4/km^{2} (1.0/sq mi)
- Time zone: CST
  - Summer (DST): CST
- Area codes: 306 and 639

The Rural Municipality of Sarnia No. 221 (2016 population: 322) is a rural municipality (RM) in the Canadian province of Saskatchewan within Census Division No. 6 and SARM Division No. 2. It is located in the south-central portion of the province.

== History ==
The RM of Sarnia No. 221 incorporated as a rural municipality on December 13, 1909.

== Geography ==
=== Communities and localities ===
The following urban municipalities are surrounded by the RM.

Villages

- Chamberlain
- Dilke
- Holdfast

Resort villages

- Alice Beach
- Grandview Beach
- Wee Too Beach

The following unincorporated communities are within the RM.

Organized hamlets

- Sarnia Beach

=== Lakes and rivers ===
The following is a list of notable lakes and rivers in the RM:

- Last Mountain Lake
- Arm River
- Lovering Lakes

=== Parks ===
The following is a list of parks in the RM:

- Arm River Recreation Site

== Demographics ==
Population history (1981–2016)
Year	Pop.	±%
1981	451	—
1986	413	−8.4%
1991	365	−11.6%
1996	327	−10.4%
2001	284	−13.1%
2006	254	−10.6%
2011	266	+4.7%
2016	322	+21.1%
Source: Statistics Canada via Saskatchewan Bureau of Statistics

In the 2021 Census of Population conducted by Statistics Canada, the RM of Sarnia No. 221 had a population of 326 living in 135 of its 244 total private dwellings, a change of 1.2% from its 2016 population of 322. With a land area of 863.89 km^{2} (333.55 sq mi), it had a population density of 0.4/km^{2} (1.0/sq mi) in 2021.

In the 2016 Census of Population, the RM of Sarnia No. 221 recorded a population of 322 living in 131 of its 255 total private dwellings, a 21.1% change from its 2011 population of 266. With a land area of 870.73 km^{2} (336.19 sq mi), it had a population density of 0.4/km^{2} (1.0/sq mi) in 2016.

== Government ==
The RM of Sarnia No. 221 is governed by an elected municipal council and an appointed administrator that meets on the second Thursday of every month. The reeve of the RM is Carl Erlandson while its administrator is Sarah Goad. The RM's office is located in Holdfast.
