= Rural Municipality of Craik No. 222 =

Rural municipality in Saskatchewan, Canada

Craik No. 222
- Rural municipality
- Rural Municipality of Craik No. 222
- Location of the RM of Craik No. 222 in Saskatchewan
- Coordinates: 50.854°N 105.790°W
- Country: Canada
- Province: Saskatchewan
- Census division: 7
- SARM division: 2
- Formed: December 9, 1912

Government
  - Reeve: Neil Dolman
  - Governing body: RM of Craik No. 222 Council
  - Administrator: JoAnne Yates
  - Office location: Craik

Area (2016)
  - Land: 885.41 km^{2} (341.86 sq mi)

Population (2016)
  - Total: 259
  - Density: 0.3/km^{2} (0.78/sq mi)
- Time zone: CST
  - Summer (DST): CST
- Area codes: 306 and 639

The Rural Municipality of Craik No. 222 (2016 population: 259) is a rural municipality (RM) in the Canadian province of Saskatchewan within Census Division No. 7 and SARM Division No. 2. The RM is centrally located between the cities of Regina and Saskatoon.

== History ==
The RM of Craik No. 222 incorporated as a rural municipality on December 9, 1912.

== Geography ==
=== Communities and localities ===
The following urban municipalities are surrounded by the RM:

Towns

- Craik

Villages

- Aylesbury

=== Parks ===
The following parks are within the RM:

- Craik and District Regional Park
- Lovering Lake Recreation Site

== Demographics ==
Population history (1981–2016)
Year	Pop.	±%
1981	443	—
1986	372	−16.0%
1991	393	+5.6%
1996	351	−10.7%
2001	327	−6.8%
2006	288	−11.9%
2011	299	+3.8%
2016	259	−13.4%
Source: Statistics Canada via Saskatchewan Bureau of Statistics

In the 2021 Census of Population conducted by Statistics Canada, the RM of Craik No. 222 had a population of 272 living in 124 of its 169 total private dwellings, a change of 5% from its 2016 population of 259. With a land area of 868.48 km^{2} (335.32 sq mi), it had a population density of 0.3/km^{2} (0.8/sq mi) in 2021.

In the 2016 Census of Population, the RM of Craik No. 222 recorded a population of 259 living in 110 of its 137 total private dwellings, a −6.2% change from its 2011 population of 276. With a land area of 885.41 km^{2} (341.86 sq mi), it had a population density of 0.3/km^{2} (0.8/sq mi) in 2016.

== Government ==
The RM of Craik No. 222 is governed by an elected municipal council and an appointed administrator that meets on the second Thursday of every month. The reeve of the RM is Neil Dolman while its administrator is JoAnne Yates. The RM's office is located in Craik.
