= Rural Municipality of Dufferin No. 190 =

Rural municipality in Saskatchewan, Canada

Dufferin No. 190
- Rural municipality
- Rural Municipality of Dufferin No. 190
- Location of the RM of Dufferin No. 190 in Saskatchewan
- Coordinates: 50.664°N 105.421°W
- Country: Canada
- Province: Saskatchewan
- Census division: 6
- SARM division: 2
- Formed: December 9, 1912

Government
  - Reeve: Russ Kirzinger
  - Governing body: RM of Dufferin No. 190 Council
  - Administrator: Rodney Audette
  - Office location: Bethune

Area (2016)
  - Land: 957.04 km^{2} (369.52 sq mi)

Population (2016)
  - Total: 559
  - Density: 0.6/km^{2} (1.6/sq mi)
- Time zone: CST
  - Summer (DST): CST
- Area codes: 306 and 639

The Rural Municipality of Dufferin No. 190 (2016 population: 559) is a rural municipality (RM) in the Canadian province of Saskatchewan within Census Division No. 6 and SARM Division No. 2. It is located in the south-central portion of the province.

== History ==
The RM of Dufferin No. 190 incorporated as a rural municipality on December 9, 1912.

== Geography ==
=== Communities and localities ===
The following urban municipalities are surrounded by the RM.

Villages

- Bethune
- Findlater

The following unincorporated communities are within the RM.

Localities

- North Grove

== Demographics ==
Population history (1981–2016)
| Year | Pop. | ±% |
|---|---|---|
| 1981 | 616 | — |
| 1986 | 598 | −2.9% |
| 1991 | 574 | −4.0% |
| 1996 | 582 | +1.4% |
| 2001 | 563 | −3.3% |
| 2006 | 540 | −4.1% |
| 2011 | 512 | −5.2% |
| 2016 | 559 | +9.2% |
Source: Statistics Canada via Saskatchewan Bureau of Statistics

In the 2021 Census of Population conducted by Statistics Canada, the RM of Dufferin No. 190 had a population of 454 living in 209 of its 328 total private dwellings, a change of −18.8% from its 2016 population of 559. With a land area of 949.88 km^{2} (366.75 sq mi), it had a population density of 0.5/km^{2} (1.2/sq mi) in 2021.

In the 2016 Census of Population, the RM of Dufferin No. 190 recorded a population of 559 living in 181 of its 327 total private dwellings, a 13.8% change from its 2011 population of 491. With a land area of 957.04 km^{2} (369.52 sq mi), it had a population density of 0.6/km^{2} (1.5/sq mi) in 2016.

== Government ==
The RM of Dufferin No. 190 is governed by an elected municipal council and an appointed administrator that meets on the second Wednesday of every month. The reeve of the RM is Russ Kirzinger while its administrator is Rodney Audette. The RM's office is located in Bethune.
