= Craik, Saskatchewan =

Town in Saskatchewan, Canada

Town of Craik
- Town
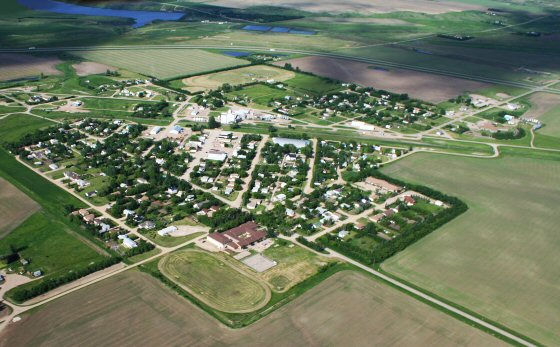
- Aerial view of Craik
- Nickname: Friendliest Town by a Dam Site
- Location of Craik in Saskatchewan Town of Craik (Canada)
- Coordinates: 51.048°N 105.819°W
- Country: Canada
- Province: Saskatchewan
- Census division: No. 7
- Rural Municipality: Craik No. 222
- Post office established: 1903-08-01
- Village Incorporated: 1903
- Town Incorporated: 1907

Government
  - Mayor: Mark Wegner
  - Governing body: Craik Town Council

Area
  - Land: 3.02 km^{2} (1.17 sq mi)

Population (2011)
  - Total: 453
  - Density: 150/km^{2} (390/sq mi)
- Time zone: CST
- Postal code: S0G 0V0
- Area code: 306
- Highways: Highway 11
- Waterways: Lake Diefenbaker *Last Mountain Lake
- Website: Town Website

Craik is a town in south central Saskatchewan, Canada, incorporated on August 1, 1907. It is strategically located along Highway 11 (Louis Riel Trail) in the RM of Craik No. 222, about 140 kilometres (87 mi) south-east of Saskatoon and 117 kilometres (73 mi) north-west of Regina.

== History ==
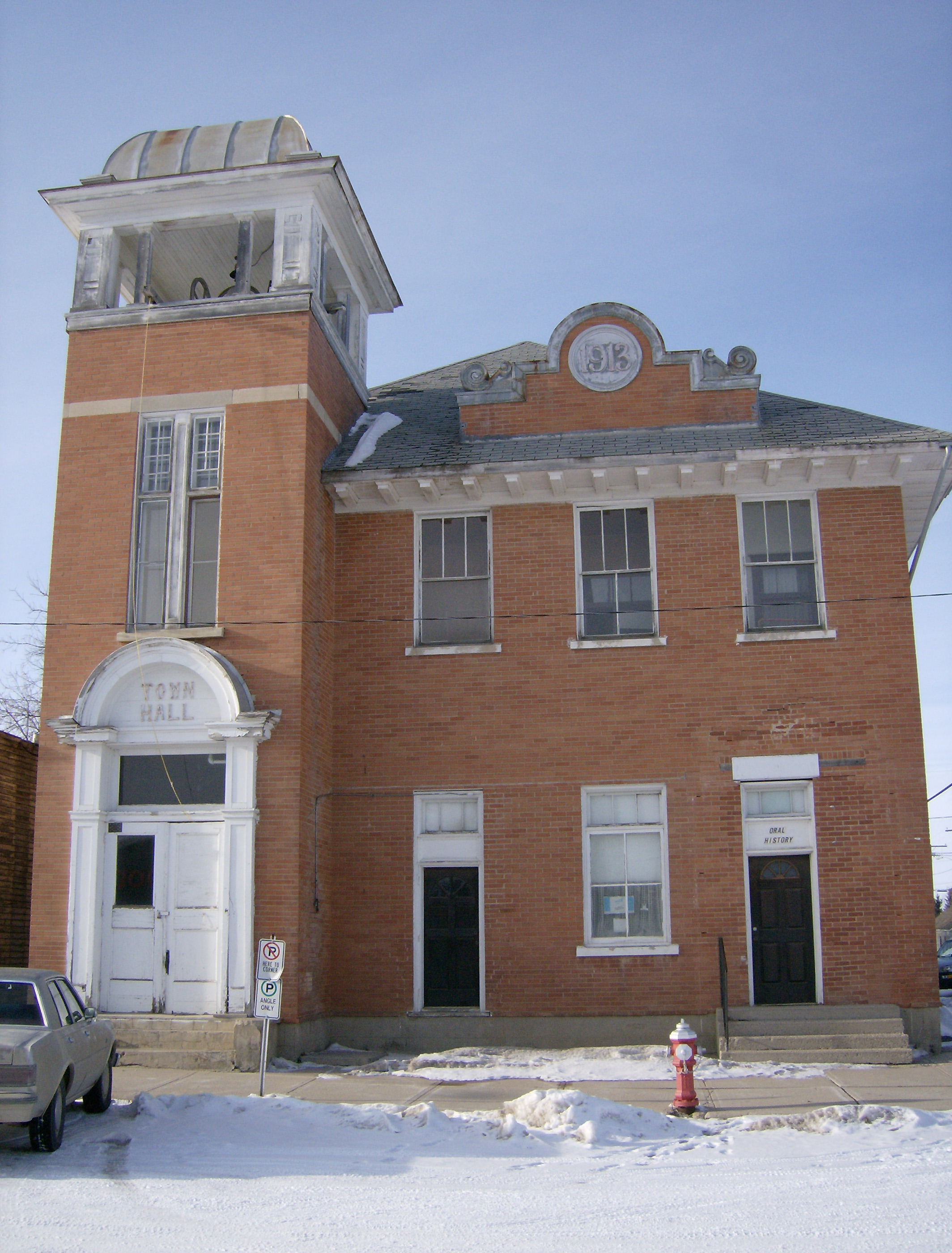
Town hall, Craik

Craik began as a railway station along the railway line established between Regina and Saskatoon by 1890, with homesteading beginning in 1901. The route between the two main settlements was by foot and cart prior to this. Many settlers came from western Europe via the United States in response to the availability of farming land. Craik was incorporated as a village in 1903, and a town in 1907.

== Demographics ==
In the 2021 Census of Population conducted by Statistics Canada, Craik had a population of 405 living in 187 of its 221 total private dwellings, a change of 3.3% from its 2016 population of 392. With a land area of 3.08 km^{2} (1.19 sq mi), it had a population density of 131.5/km^{2} (340.6/sq mi) in 2021.

== Education ==
Craik was part of the Davidson School Division, but after amalgamations of school divisions it became part of the Prairie South School Division. Craik is home to a kindergarten to grade 12 public school, as well as the Praxis International Institute.

== Craik Sustainable Living Project ==
Craik is part of the Saskatchewan Regional Centres of Expertise (RCE) and is home to the Craik Sustainable Living Project, which is working to build a sustainable community. Major components of this project are the Eco-Village and Eco-Centre, as well as education and action.

== Economy ==
The town's economy is based almost exclusively on agriculture, although efforts by the town and RM have been made to attract and develop industry related to the principles of sustainability. The community has a compost program that includes kitchen scraps as well as seasonal yard waste, with service provided by Titan Carbon Smart Technologies.

== Media ==
Local news coverage is provided by the Craik Weekly News and the Davidson Leader.

== Craik and District Regional Park ==
Craik and District Regional Park (51.0607°N 105.7986°W) is a regional park located north-east of Craik at the south end of Arm Lake by Arm Lake Dam. Opened on July 18, 1971, it sits on 26 acres of well treed, fenced land. In 1966, three years after the completion of the dam, 1,500 trees, including 100 maples, 800 Manchurian elms, 500 caraganas, and 100 willows, were transplanted from a nearby nursery by volunteers. In a joint venture by the RMs of Craik and Arm River, a unique kidney-shaped outdoor swimming pool was built at the site and opened for August 1967.

The regional park now features camping with 30 amp service, mini-golf, trails, and access to the lake for swimming, boating, fishing, and other water sports.

Beside the park is the Craik and District Golf Course. Nearby, in Craik, there are other recreational facilities including a curling / skating rink and ball diamonds.

== Arts and culture ==
- The Prairie Pioneer Museum (c. 1966) is a municipal heritage property on the Canadian Register of Historic Places.
- The Craik Town Hall, built in 1912-13, is also on the Canadian Register of Historic Places.

== Notable people ==
Notable persons who were born, grew up, or lived in Craik:

- Jim Archibald - ice hockey player
- Garnet Exelby - ice hockey player
- Chris Neiszner - ice hockey player
- Jeremy Reich - ice hockey player

== See also ==
- List of towns in Saskatchewan
- List of communities in Saskatchewan
- List of historic places in Saskatchewan
