= Chamberlain, Saskatchewan =

Village in Saskatchewan, Canada

Chamberlain
- Village
- Village of Chamberlain
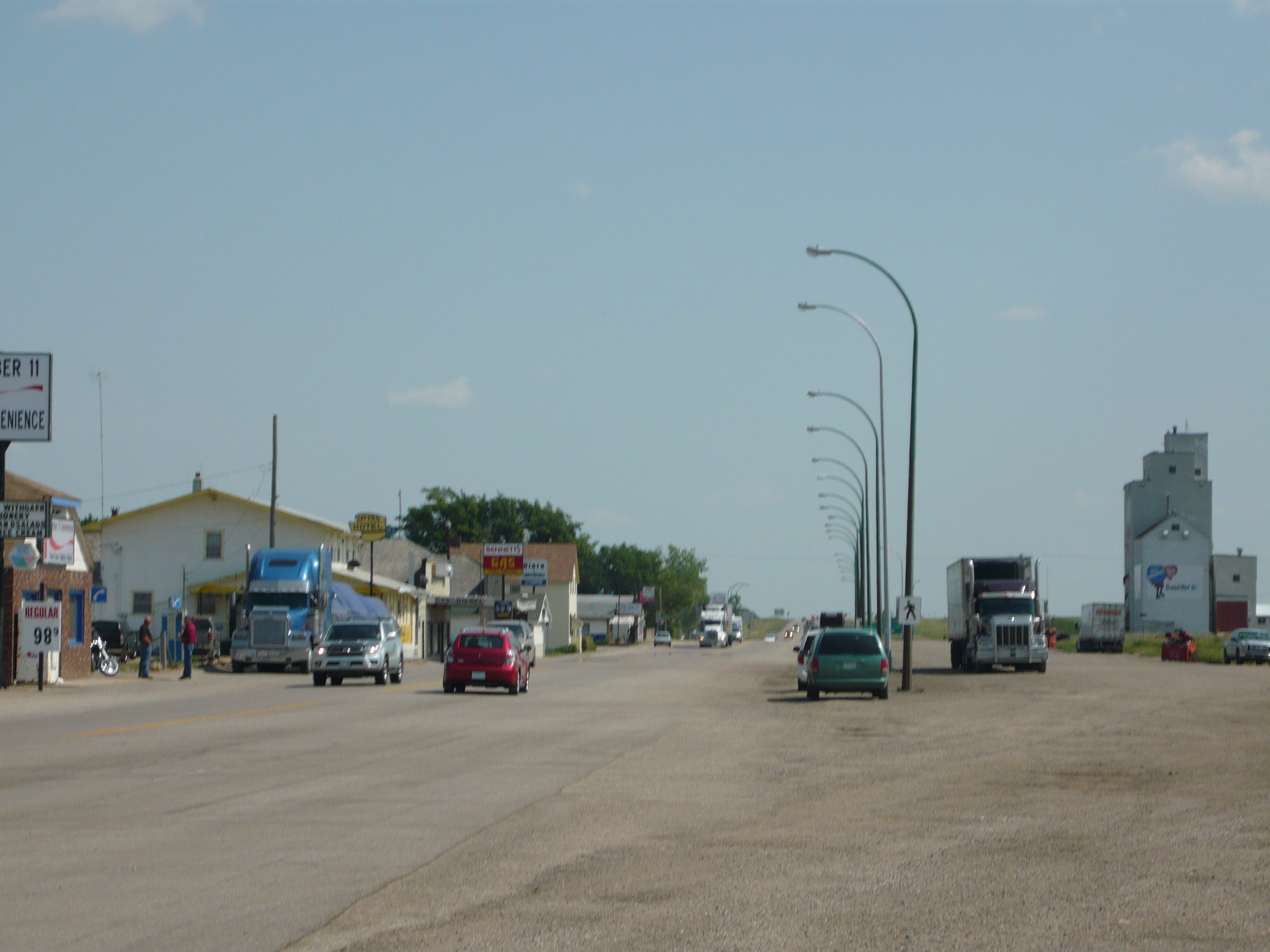
- Chamberlain's Business District along Highway 11

- Location of Chamberlain in Saskatchewan Chamberlain (Canada)
- Coordinates: 50°51′05″N 105°34′05″W
- Country: Canada
- Province: Saskatchewan
- Region: South-central
- Rural Municipality: Sarnia No. 221
- Post office Founded: Oct 1, 1904
- Incorporated (Village): Jan 31, 1910

Government
  - Type: Municipal
  - Governing body: Chamberlain Village Council
  - Mayor: Shawn Ackerman
  - Administrator: Sarah Wells

Area
  - Total: 0.70 km^{2} (0.27 sq mi)

Population (2016)
  - Total: 90
  - Density: 129.1/km^{2} (334/sq mi)
- Time zone: UTC-6 (CST)
- Postal code: S0G 0R0
- Area code: 306
- Highways: Highway 11; Highway 2 Highway 733
- Railways: Last Mountain Railway

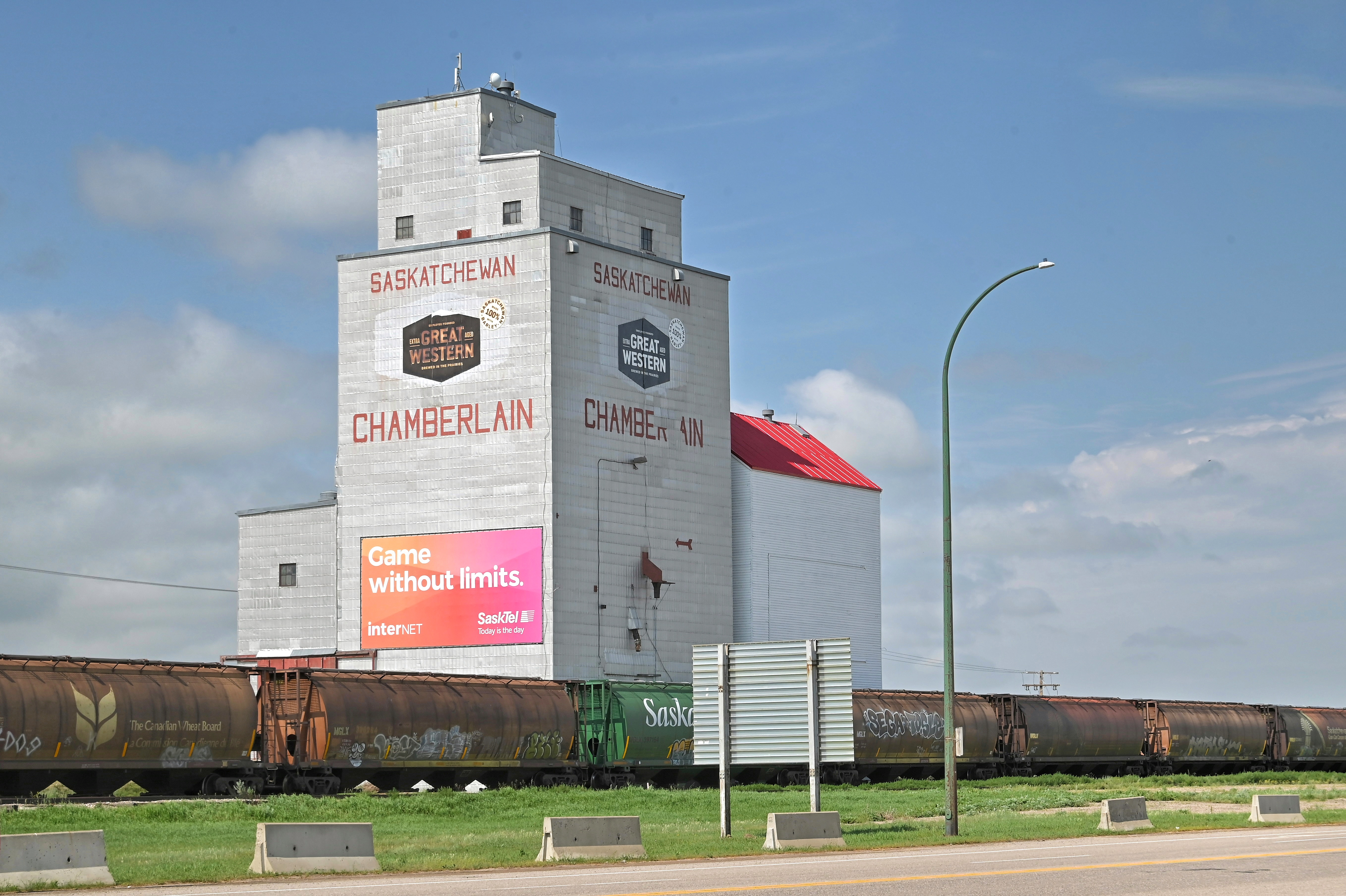
Grain elevator in Chamberlain

Chamberlain (2016 population: 90) is a village in the Canadian province of Saskatchewan within the Rural Municipality of Sarnia No. 221 and Census Division No. 6.

Chamberlain is notable for being the last community between Regina and Saskatoon that Highway 11, the Louis Riel Trail, still passes through. The highway narrows to two lanes and its speed limit is reduced from 110 km/h to 50 km/h. A number of small restaurants and gas stations benefit from having traffic pass through at slow speed. The village is only about half an hour drive from Moose Jaw, an hour from Regina and one and a half hours from Saskatoon. Highway 11 has been realigned around all other communities along its route.

== History ==
Chamberlain incorporated as a village on January 31, 1911.

== Demographics ==
Population history (1981–2016)
Year	Pop.	±%
1981	136	—
1986	137	+0.7%
1991	129	−5.8%
1996	114	−11.6%
2001	89	−21.9%
2006	108	+21.3%
2011	88	−18.5%
2016	90	+2.3%
Source: Statistics Canada via Saskatchewan Bureau of Statistics

In the 2021 Census of Population conducted by Statistics Canada, Chamberlain had a population of 96 living in 44 of its 52 total private dwellings, a change of 6.7% from its 2016 population of 90. With a land area of 0.68 km^{2} (0.26 sq mi), it had a population density of 141.2/km^{2} (365.6/sq mi) in 2021.

In the 2016 Census of Population, the Village of Chamberlain recorded a population of 90 living in 46 of its 56 total private dwellings, a 2.2% change from its 2011 population of 88. With a land area of 0.7 km^{2} (0.27 sq mi), it had a population density of 128.6/km^{2} (333.0/sq mi) in 2016.

== See also ==
- List of communities in Saskatchewan
- List of villages in Saskatchewan
