= List of Saskatchewan municipal roads (700–799) =

The following is a list of rural municipality highways in the Canadian province of Saskatchewan between the numbers 700 and 799. The 700-series highways run west and east and, generally, the last two digits increase from south to north. Many of these highways are gravel for some of their length.

== SK 700 ==
Highway 700
- Length: 35.8 km (22.2 mi)

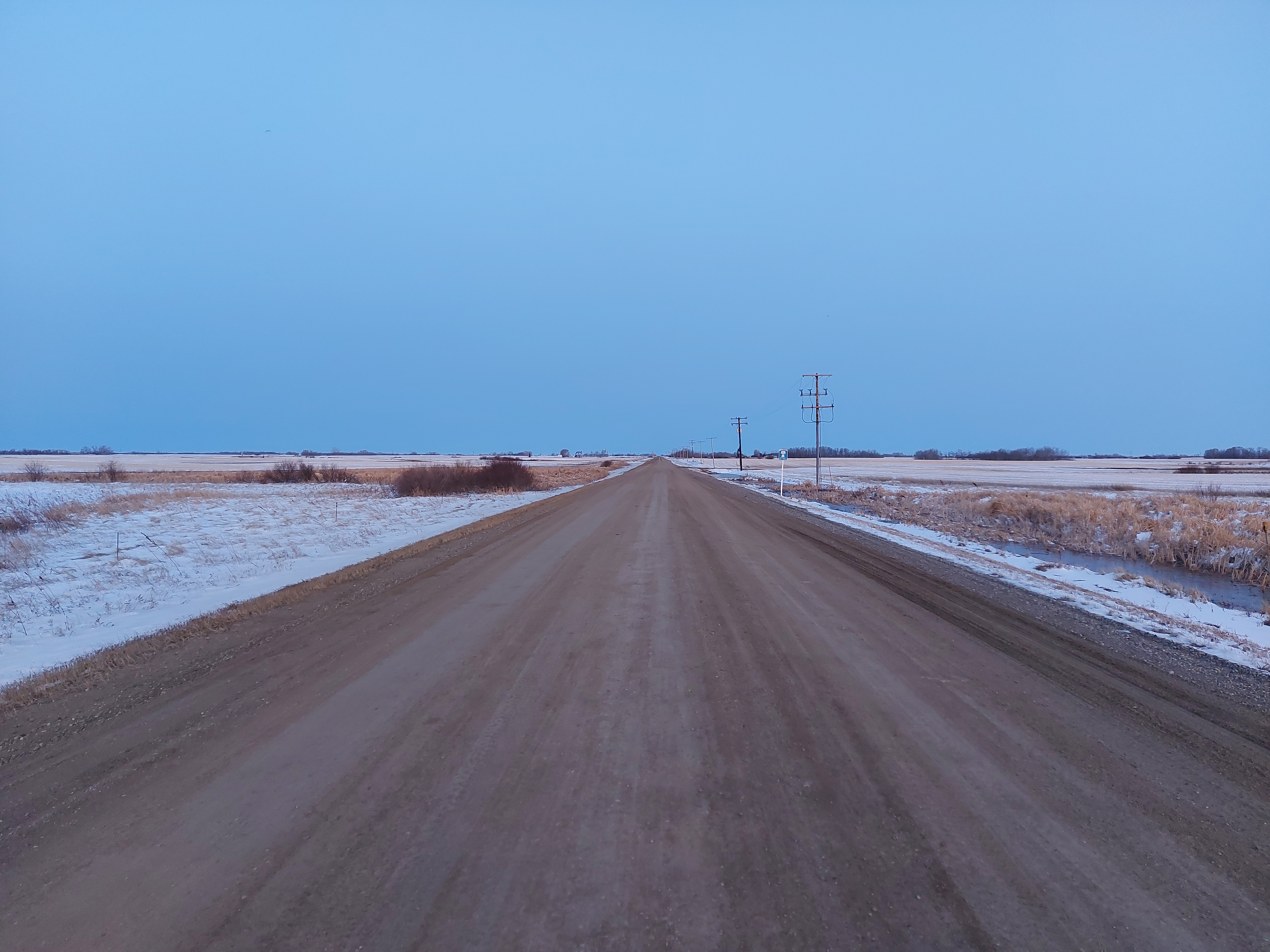
Highway 700

Highway 700 runs from Highway 9 near Alameda west to Highway 605, 9.6 kilometres (6.0 mi) south of Lampman. Steelman is the only community along the highway. It is about 35 kilometres (22 mi) long.

== SK 701 ==
Highway 701
- Length: 32 km (20 mi)

Highway 701 runs from Creelman at Highway 33 east to Highway 616 at the western end of the Moose Mountain Upland. It is about 32 kilometres (20 mi) long.

== SK 702 ==
Highway 702
- Length: 31.5 km (19.6 mi)

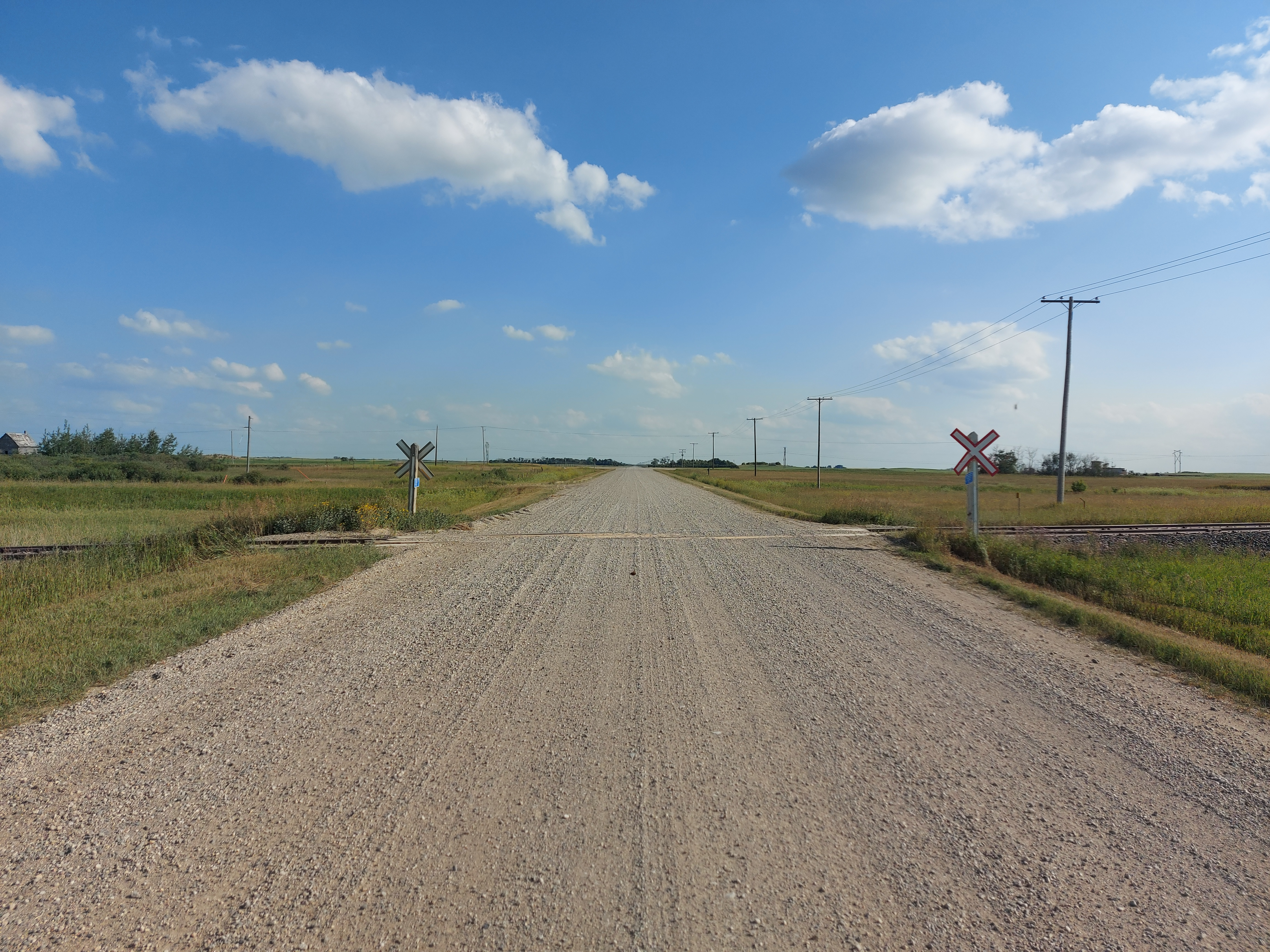
CN level crossing at Highway 702 at Browning

Highway 702 runs from Highway 39 in Midale to Highways 47 / 361 near Cullen. Highway 702 passes through Bryant. It is about 31.5 kilometres (19.6 mi) long.

== SK 703 ==
Highway 703
- Length: 65.5 km (40.7 mi)

Highway 703 is split into two sections. The section to the south runs from Highway 47 south of Estevan east to Highway 604 north of North Portal. This section is about 32.5 kilometres (20.2 mi) long and runs parallel to, and is approximately 3 kilometres (1.9 mi) north of, the Canada–United States border.

The section to the north runs from near Pipestone Lake east to the Manitoba Border. It shares a 5.5-kilometre (3.4 mi) concurrency with Highway 601 and a 3.3-kilometre (2.1 mi) concurrency with Highway 8. It crosses Highways 1, 9, and 600. This section provides access to St. Hubert Mission and travels through Wapella. It is about 79 kilometres (49 mi) long.

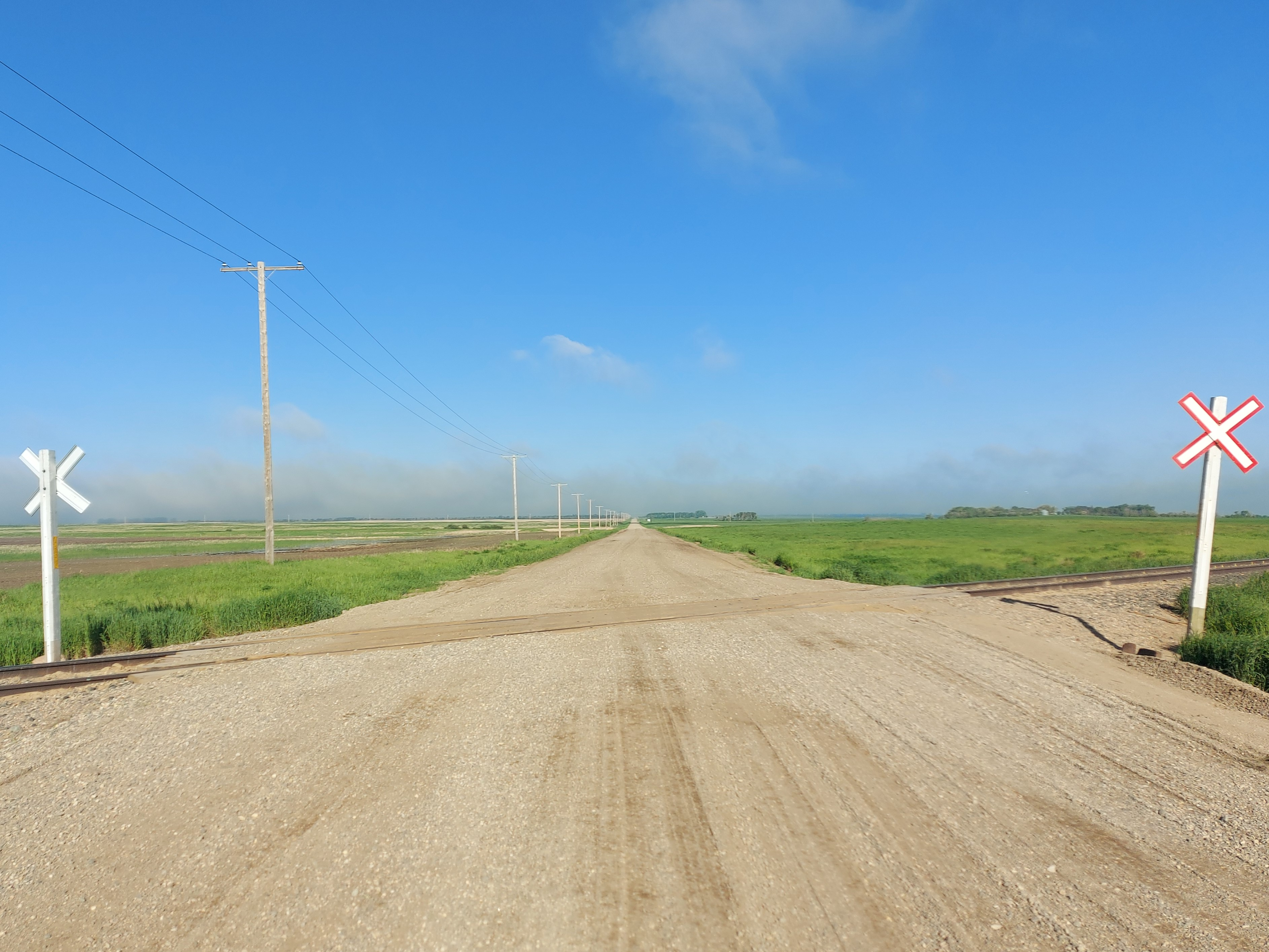
Level crossing along Highway 703 south-east of Estevan

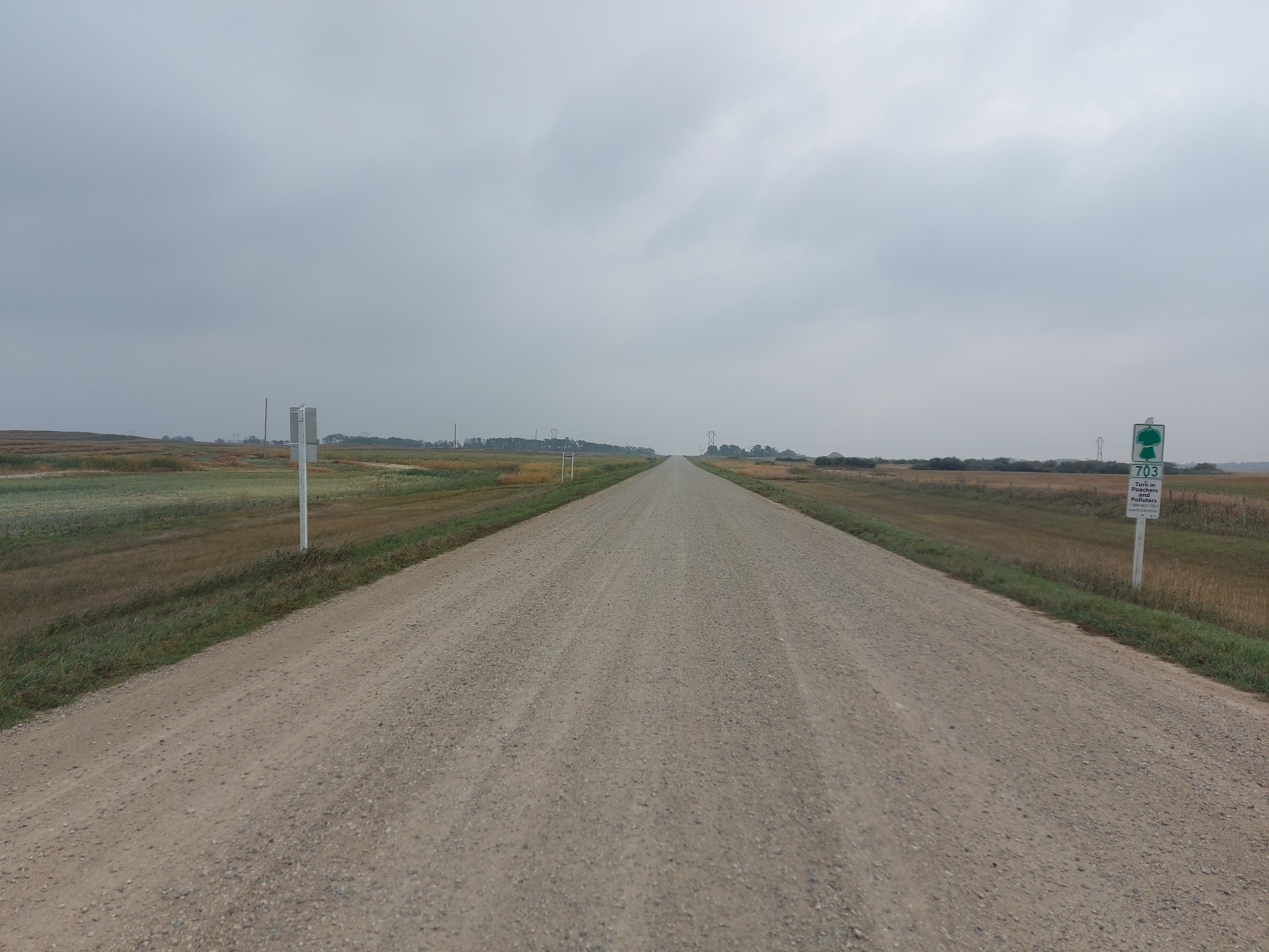
Highway 703 at Highway 9

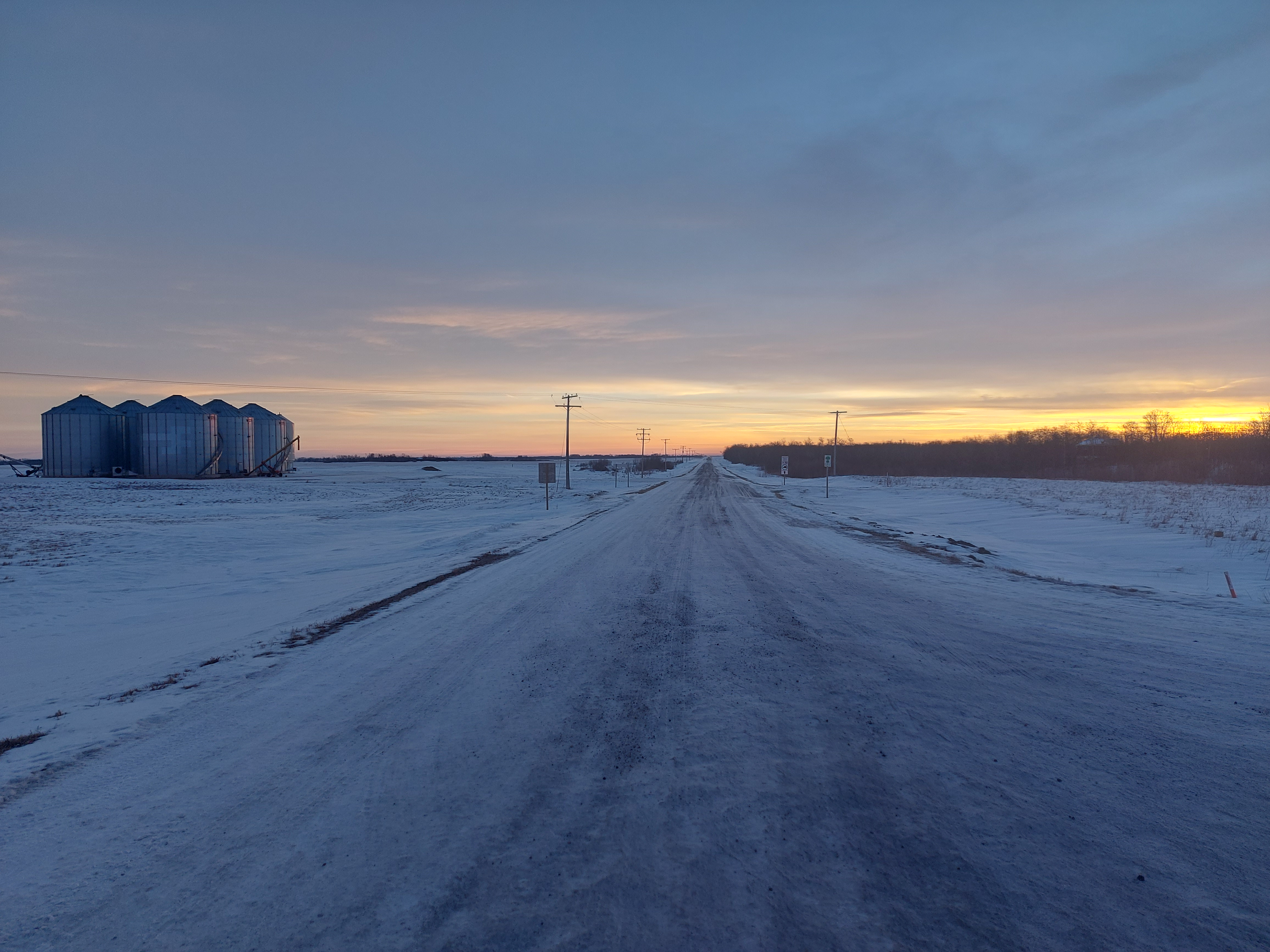
Highway 703 at Highway 8

== SK 704 ==
Highway 704
- Length: 30.5 km (19.0 mi)

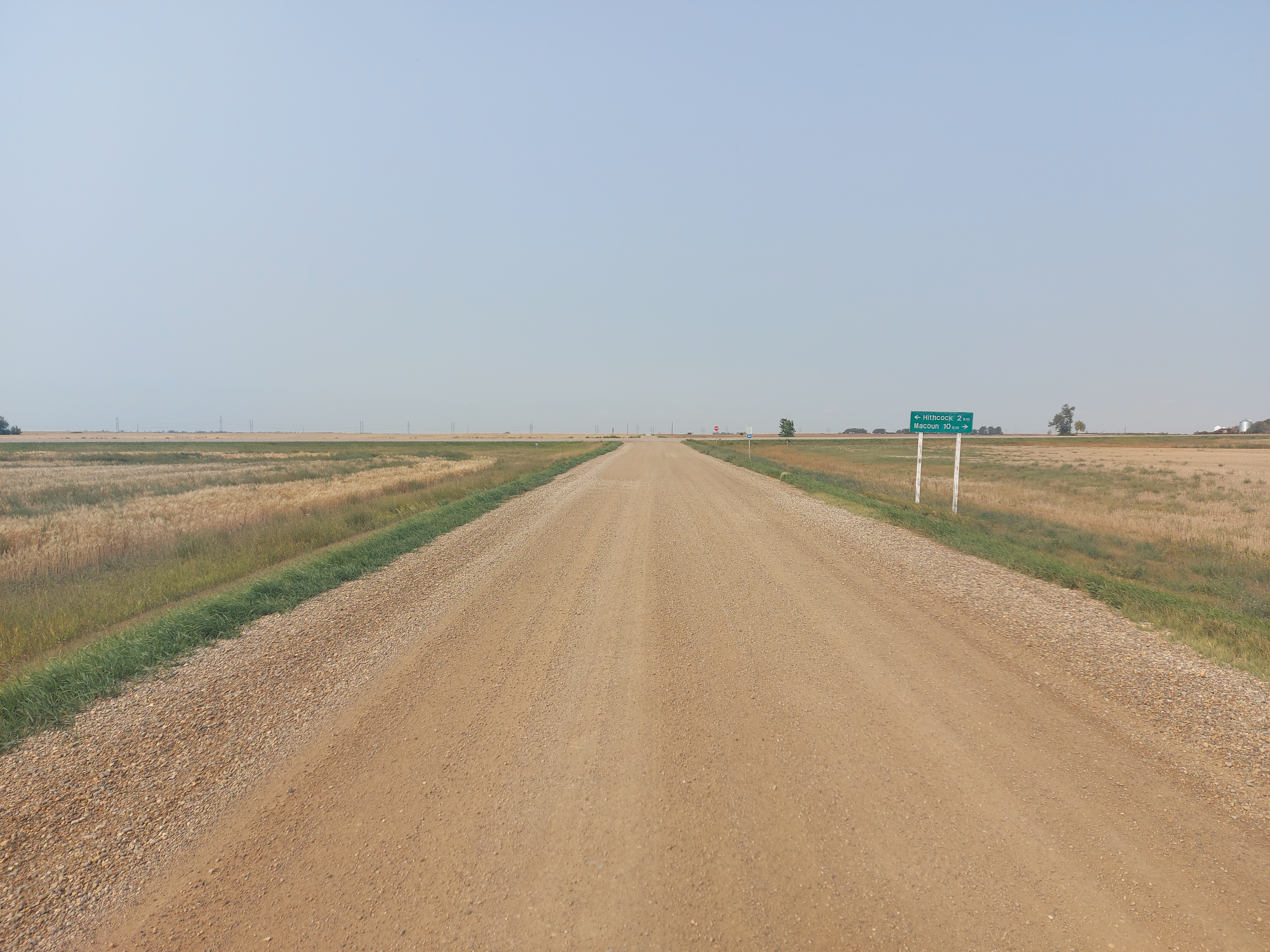
Highway 704's western terminus at Highway 39

Highway 704 runs from Highway 39 at Hitchcock east to Highway 605 north of Bienfait. It is about 30.5 kilometres (19.0 mi) long.

== SK 705 ==
Highway 705
- Length: 287 km (178 mi)

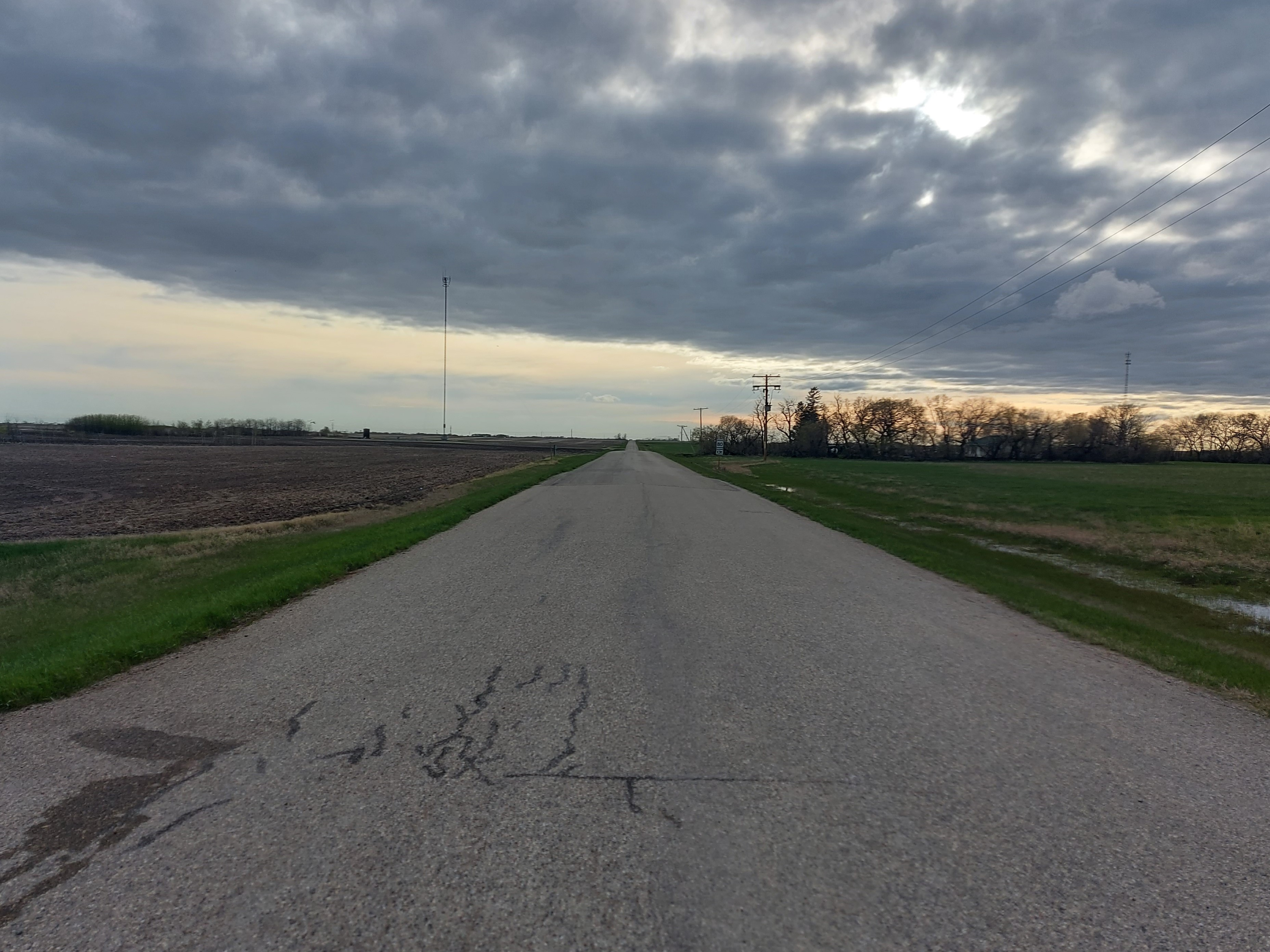
Highway 705 at its eastern terminus, north of Benson

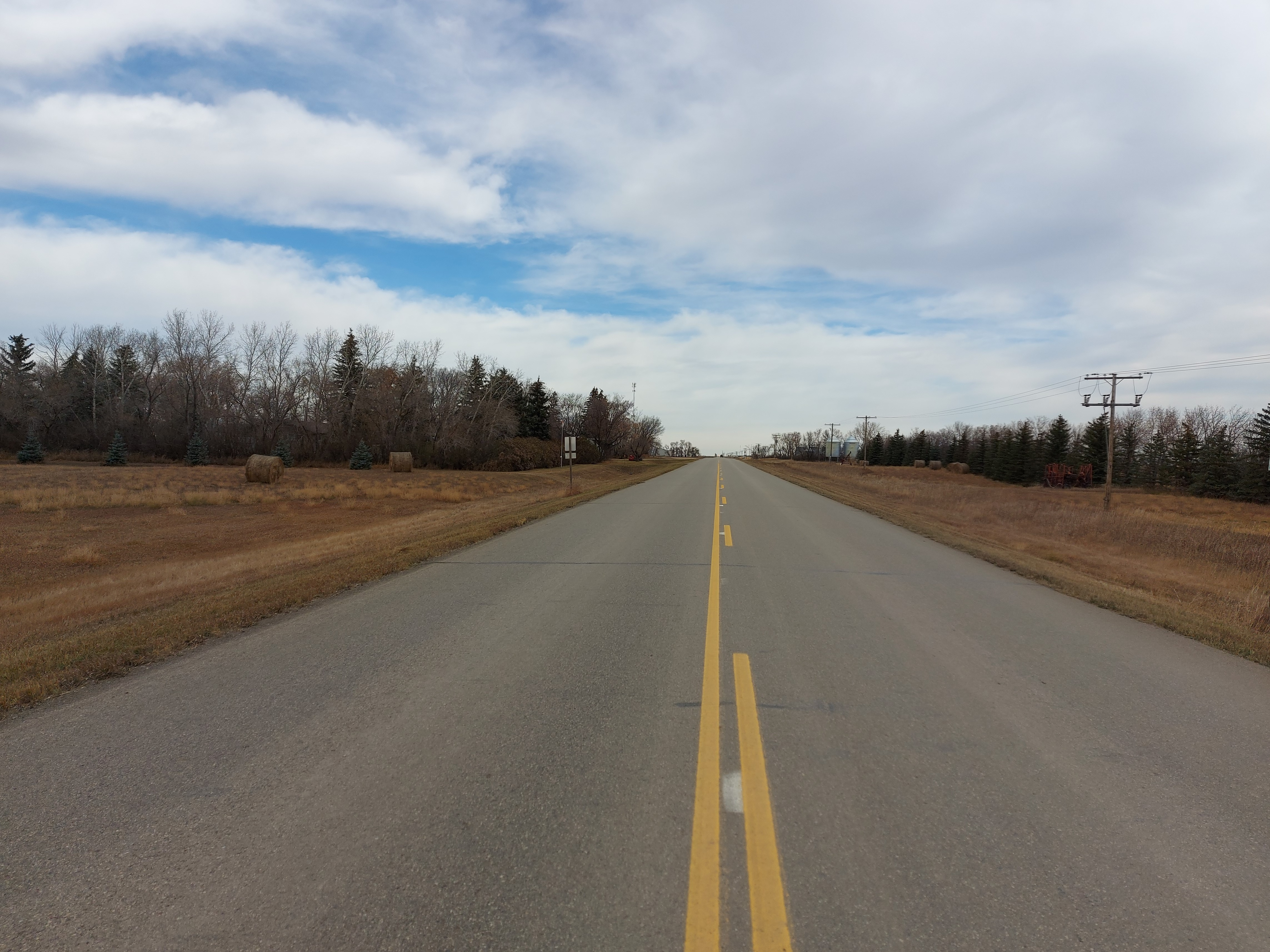
Highway 705 north of Goodwater

Highway 705 connects Highway 358 at Wood Mountain in the RM of Old Post No. 43 to Highway 47 in RM of Benson No. 35. The highway has a general bearing of west to east, however at Km 0.00, Highway 705 begins in a southerly direction, and then at Km 2.4, it turns east. At Km 22.8, Highway 705 turns north until Km 24.0 when it returns to an easterly heading. The intersection with Highway 2 is attained at Km 34.6, which is at the village of Scout Lake. Highway 2 extends to the north and provides access to the St. Victor Petroglyphs Provincial Park. At Km 36.7, the highway turns north and travels through the RM of Willow Bunch No. 42. The highway returns to the easterly course at Km 49.8. At Km 58.4, Highway 705 begins a short northern bearing concurrency with Highway 36 through the town of Willow Bunch. At Km 59.2, the concurrency ends when Highway 705 turns to the east once more. At Km 75.0, the highway turns south until Km 82.2 when it enters Harptree at the Highway 607 junction. The southerly direction is necessary to skirt around the southern shores of Willow Bunch Lake. Highway 705 again continues eastward until Km 105.4 when it reaches the Highway 34 junction. At Highway 34, there is a concurrency between Highways 705 and 34. Highway 705 then travels north to a Bengough. After travelling through Bengough, Highway 705 turns east at the junction of Highway 624 which occurs at Km 111.9. At Km 123.2, Highway 705 turns north until Km 124.7. Highway 705 travels mainly east until Km 143.5 when it meets with Highway 622. This junction is located in the RM of The Gap No. 39. There is a concurrency created between Highways 622 and 705 in a southerly direction until Km 150.0. At Km 150.0, Highway 705 returns to the eastern bearing and at Km 158.1, reaches the intersection with Highway 6. At Km 176.2, in the RM of Laurier No. 38, Highway 705 departs from the easterly route, and turns north until Km 179.3. From Km 179.3 until Km 184.2, Highway 705 travels east. At Km 184.2 Highway 705 has an intersection with Highway 28. Highway 705 continues eastward until the next intersection at Km 216.6, with Highway 35 which is in the RM of Lomond No. 37 near Colgate. After the intersection, the highway continues east until Km 226.3 where it turns north for a short jaunt. This corner is just north of the village of Goodwater. At Km 229.6, Highway 705 returns to an easterly course, until Km 241.2 when it turns north. Reaching Halbrite at Km 246.9, Highway 705 travels through the village and reaches the intersection with Highway 39, the CanAm Highway, at Km 247.1. North of Halbrite, Highway 705 turns east at Km 247.7 and reaches the intersection with Highway 606 at Km 257.4. The intersection does not change the course of the highway as it travels east until the terminus at Highway 47 in the RM of Benson No. 35. The highway is about 287 kilometres (178 mi) long.

== SK 706 ==
Highway 706
- Length: 49 km (30 mi)

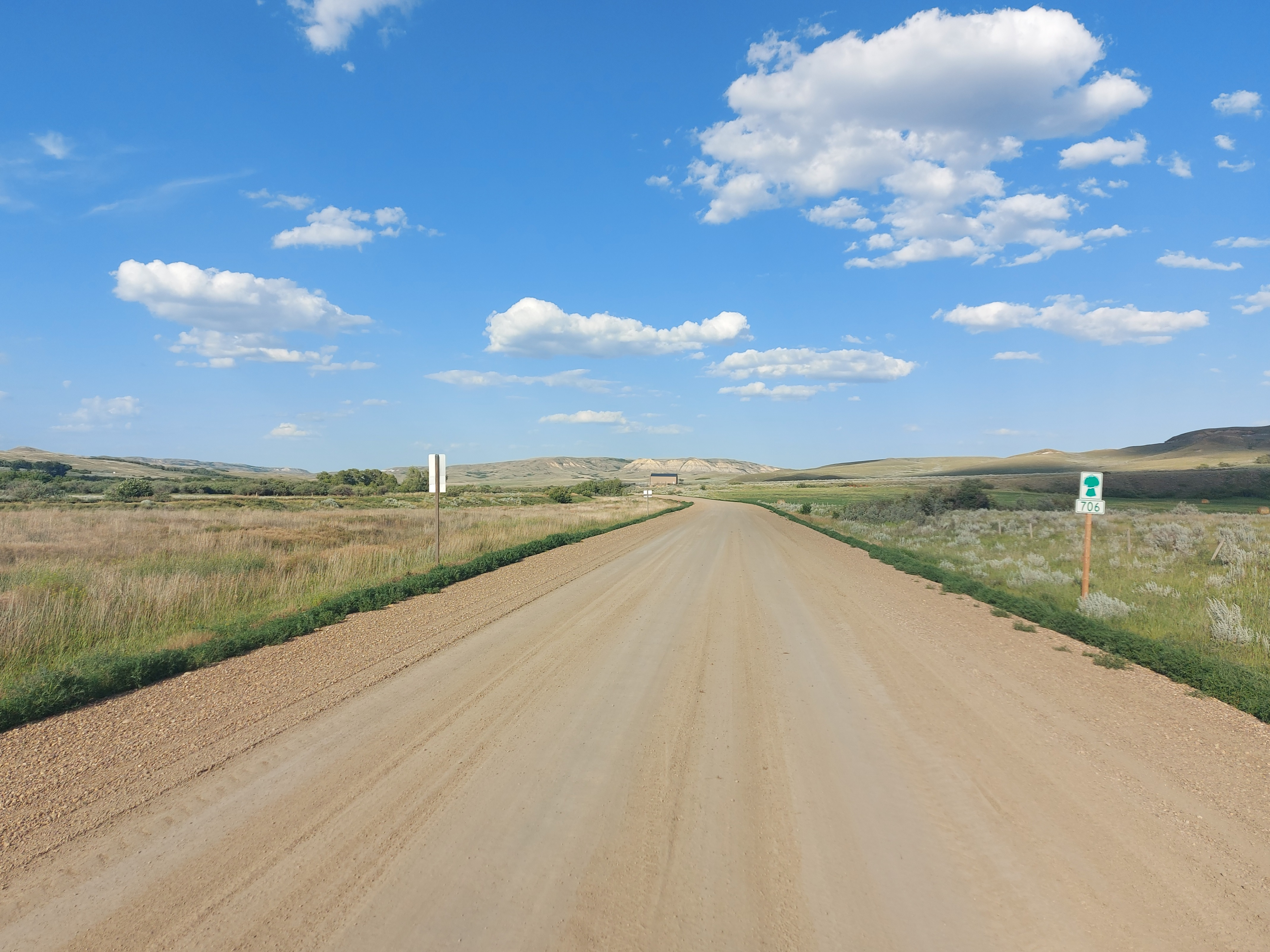
Highway 706 through the Cypress Hills

Highway 706, part of which is known as Ravenscrag Road, is split into two sections in the Cypress Hills of south-western Saskatchewan. One section runs from Highway 21 east to Highway 13. It crosses the Frenchman River at Ravenscrag, which is one of only two communities along the route. The other is Belanger. This section is about 30 kilometres (19 mi) long. The other section (Ravenscrag Road) is 19 kilometres (12 mi) long and begins in Ravenscrag at the other section of 706 and travels east following the Frenchman River to Highway 614, about 2 kilometres (1.2 mi) west of Eastend. The combined length of 706 is about 49 kilometres (30 mi).

== SK 707 ==
Highway 707
- Length: 26 km (16 mi)

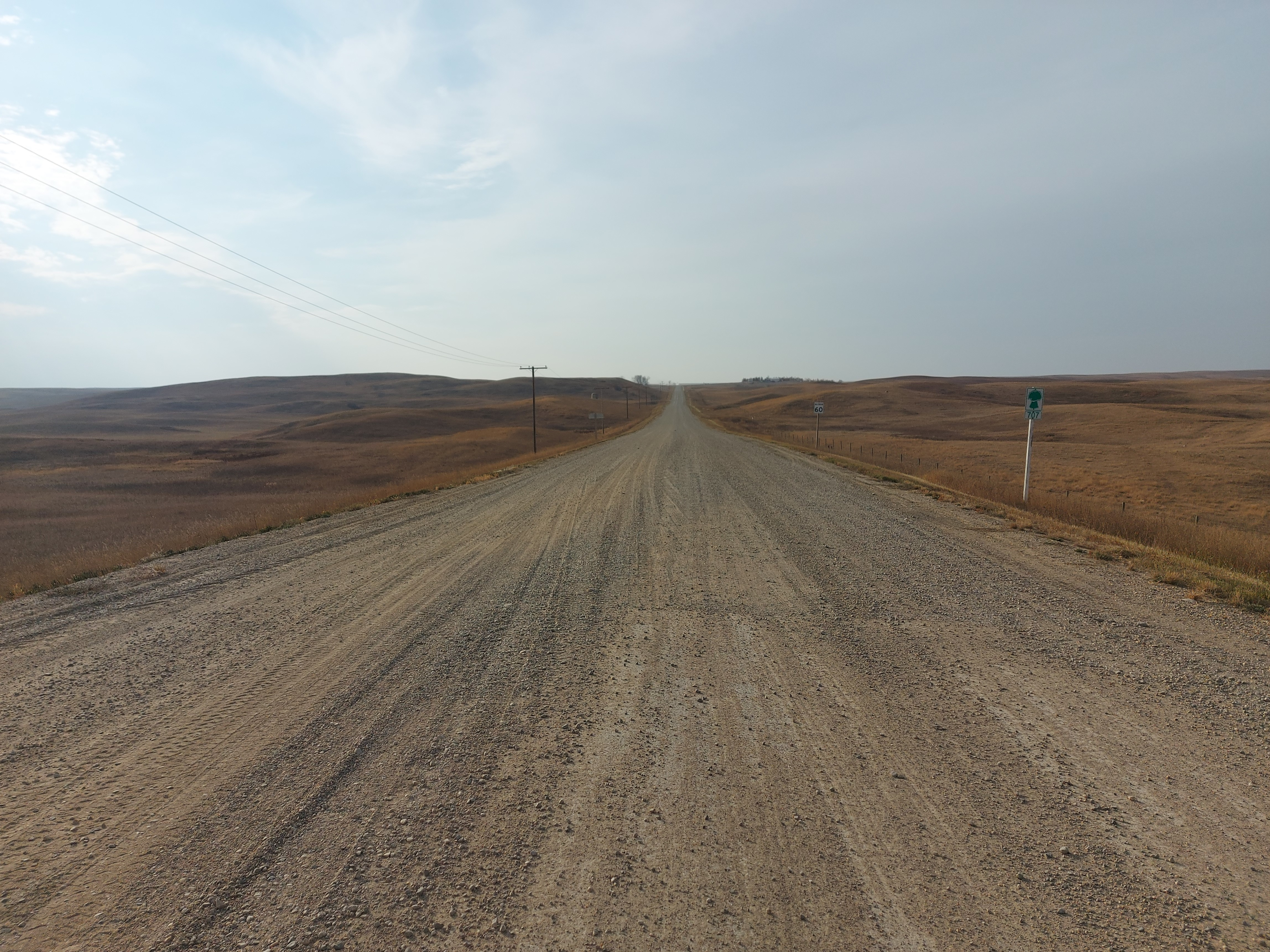
Highway 707 in the RM of Souris Valley No. 7

Highway 707 runs from Highway 18 near Beaubier to Highway 35. It passes near the community of Ratcliffe and is about 26 kilometres (16 mi) long.

== SK 708 ==
Highway 708
- Length: 60 km (37 mi)

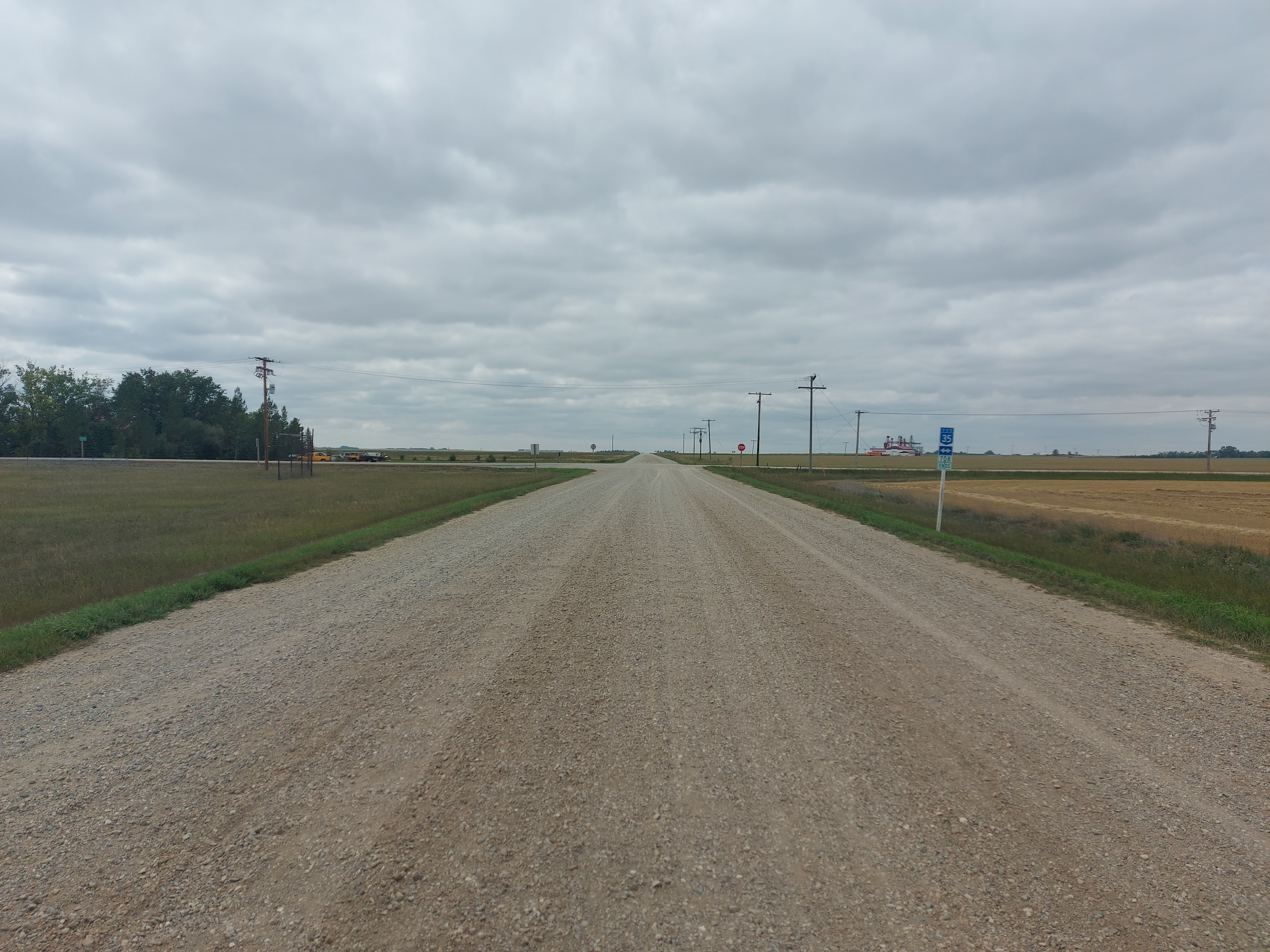
The western terminus of Hwy 708 at Hwy 35 Francis

Highway 708 runs from Highway 35 at Francis east to Highway 47. The highway intersects with 606. Francis is the only community along the route. It is about 60 kilometres (37 mi) long.

== SK 709 ==
Highway 709
- Length: 80 km (50 mi)

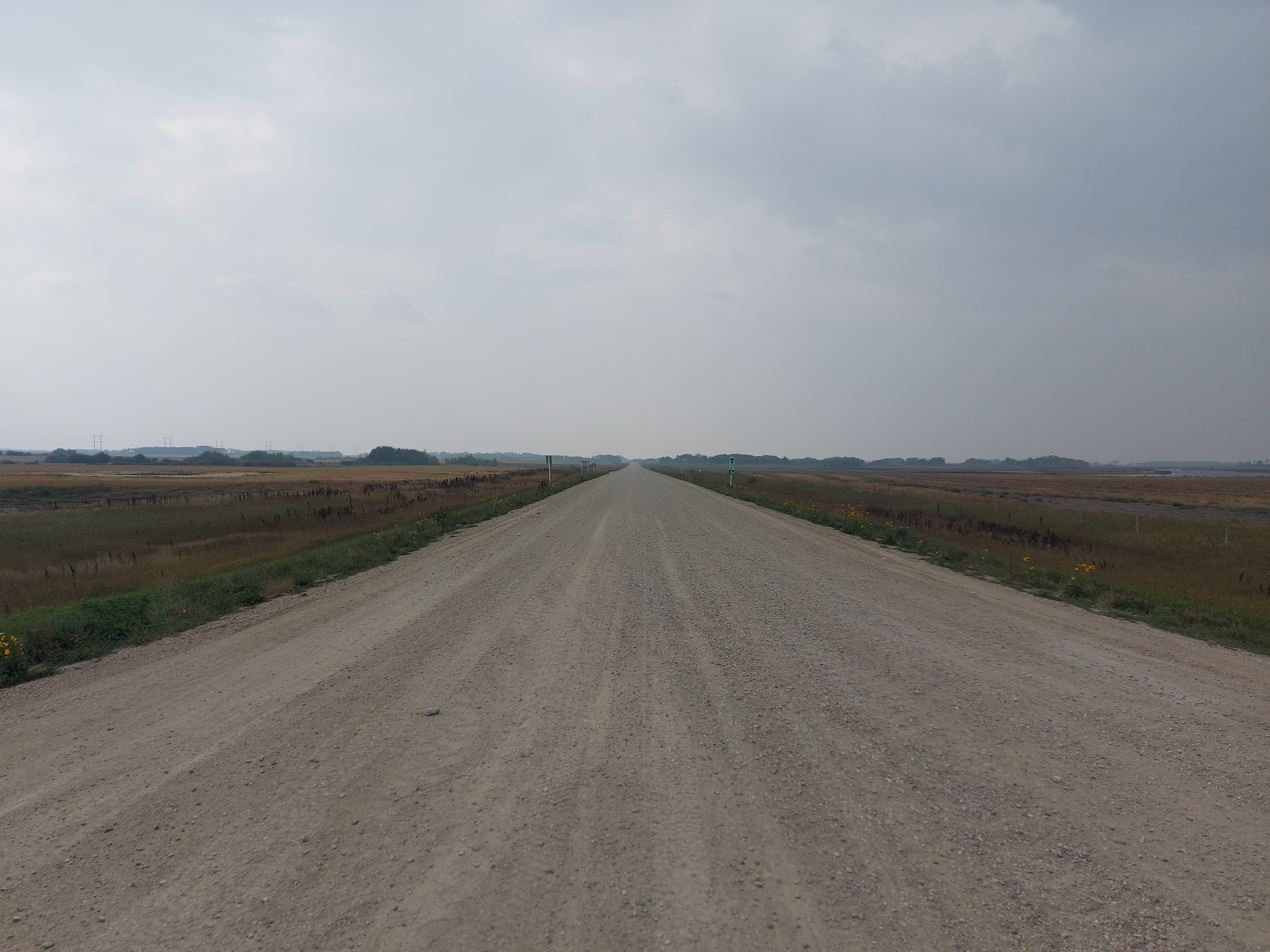
Highway 709 at Highway 9

Highway 709 runs from Highway 48 about 3.9 kilometres (2.4 mi) east of Kipling north to Highway 600 near the Manitoba border. It intersects the Trans-Canada Highway at the town of Moosomin and provides access to Moosomin Lake Regional Park. It is about 80 kilometres (50 mi) long.

== SK 710 ==
Highway 710
- Length: 37 km (23 mi)

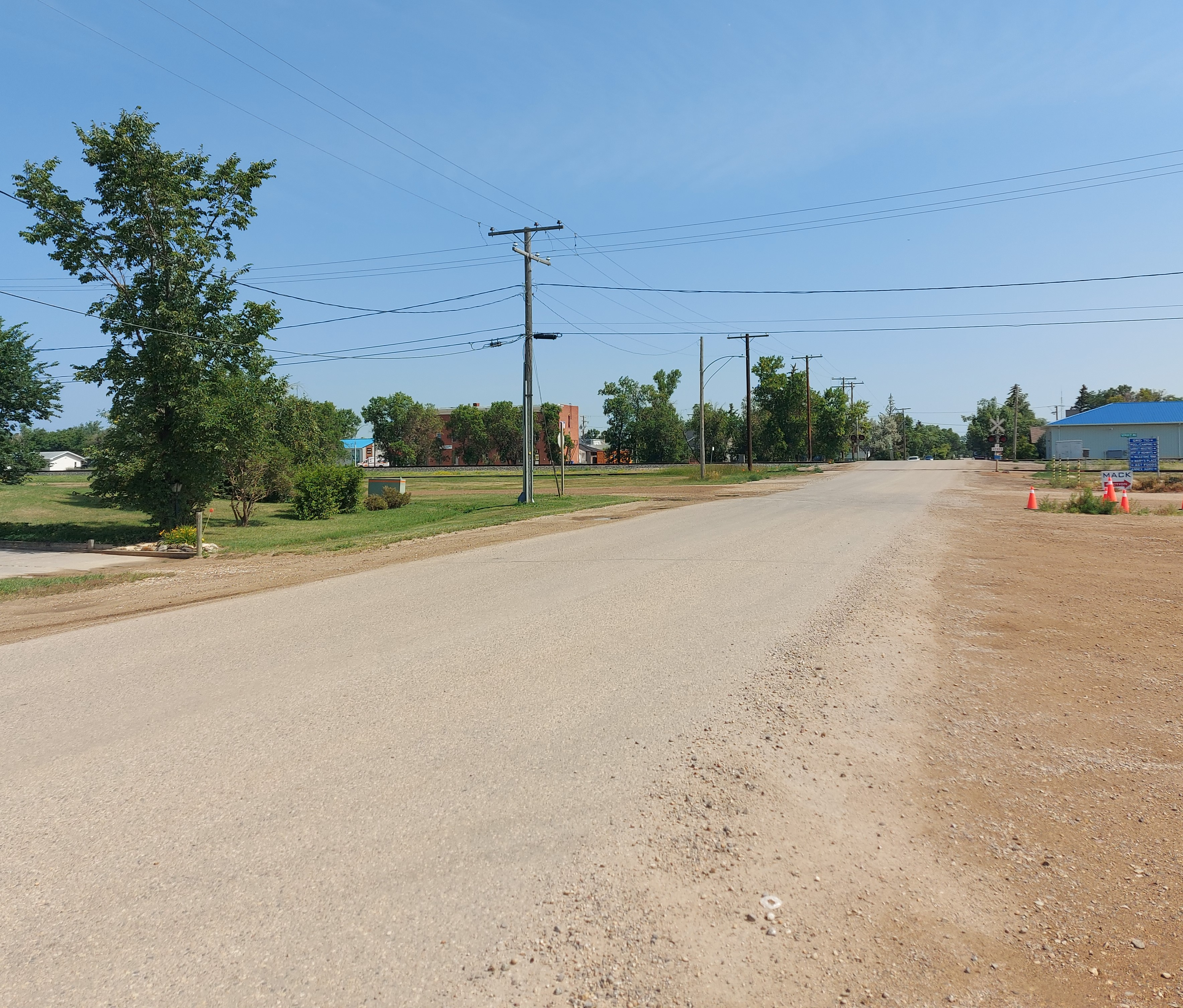
Highway 710 at Milestone

Highway 710 runs from Highway 6 east past Highway 39 and Milestone to Highway 306 at Lewvan. It is about 37 kilometres (23 mi) long.

== SK 711 ==
Highway 711
- Length: 142.1 km (88.3 mi)

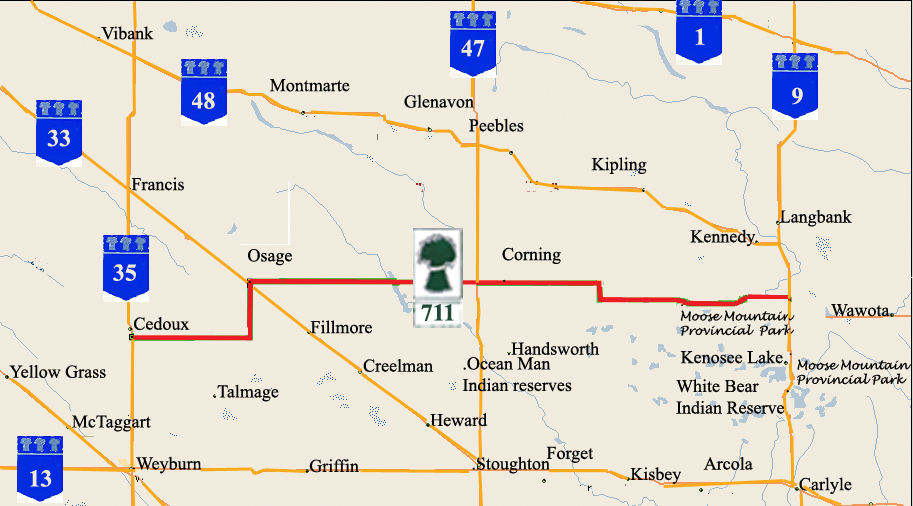
Highway 711 map

Highway 711 connects Highway 35 in the RM of Wellington No. 97 to Highway 9 in the RM of Wawken No. 93. The highway begins just south of Cedoux and it extends westward. Osage and Corning are the only communities along the route. Highway 711 passes through five different rural municipalities (RMs), including Wellington No. 97, Fillmore No. 96, Golden West No. 95, Hazelwood No. 94, and Wawken No. 93.

Highway 711 starts out in the south-eastern portion of the province at Highway 35 near Cedoux. Heading west, at Km 20.4, the highway sharply turns north continuing north for 20.3 km (12.6 mi). At Km 29.5, Highway 711 arrives at Osage and the junction with Highway 33. There is a 0.7 km (0.43 mi) concurrency with Highway 619 along the eastern edge of town. At Km 30.1, Highway 711 turns east again departing from the concurrency. The intersection with Highway 606 occurs at Km 40.0. At Km 61.1, Highway 711 is the junction with Highway 617 North. Highway 617 provides access to Glenavon. At Km 69.3, Highway 711 meets with the intersection of Highway 47. Travel on Highway 711 continues east and at Km 73.4, the highway arrives at Corning. Leaving Corning east there is a sharp turn south at Km 90.4. The highway resumes its easterly course and meets with intersection Highway 605 at Km 101.8. The ending terminus of Highway 711 is at Highway 9 north of Moose Mountain Provincial Park and the village of Kenosee Lake. Highway 711 is about 142 kilometres (88 mi) long.

== SK 712 ==
Highway 712
- Length: 23 km (14 mi)

Highway 712 runs from Highway 623 east to Highway 6. Parry is the only community along the route. It is about 23 kilometres (14 mi) long.

== SK 713 ==
Highway 713
- Length: 47 km (29 mi)

Highway 713 runs from Highway 36 east to Highway 339, approximately 4.9 km (3.0 mi) west of Avonlea. Crystal Hill is the only community along the route. It is about 47 kilometres (29 mi) long.

== SK 714 ==
Highway 714
- Length: 21 km (13 mi)

Highway 714 runs from Highway 39 at Rouleau east to Highway 6. It is about 21 kilometres (13 mi) long.

== SK 715 ==
Highway 715
- Length: 33 km (21 mi)

Highway 715 runs from Highway 36 near Galilee to Highway 339 near Claybank and traverses The Dirt Hills. The highway passes near Spring Valley and Bayard. It connects with Highway 624 near Spring Valley and about 12.8 kilometres (8.0 mi) north of Spring Valley, on the west side of the highway, is Spring Valley (North) Airport. Highway 715 is about 33 kilometres (21 mi) long.

== SK 716 ==
Highway 716
- Length: 21 km (13 mi)

Highway 716 runs from Highway 2 to Highway 339 near Briercrest. It is about 21 kilometres (13 mi) long.

== SK 717 ==
Highway 717
- Length: 68 km (42 mi)

Highway 717 runs from Highway 13 in Assiniboia to Highway 334 near Kayville. The highway runs concurrently with Highway 36 for about 6 kilometres (3.7 mi) and connects with Highway 624. It is about 68 kilometres (42 mi) long.

== SK 718 ==
Highway 718
- Length: 67 km (42 mi)

Highway 718 runs from Highway 2 near Mossbank to Highway 610 near Bateman. The highway connects with Highways 58 and 627. It is about 67 kilometres (42 mi) long.

Near where 718 crosses the Wood River is a Saskatchewan historical site. Trapper's Cabin (49.9889°N 106.487°W) is a 32-hectare (79-acre) site that has the remains of a small dugout shelter on the banks of the Wood River. Built in the 1930s, it is the only surviving trapper's cabin in the area from the fur trade.

== SK 719 ==
Highway 719
- Length: 23 km (14 mi)

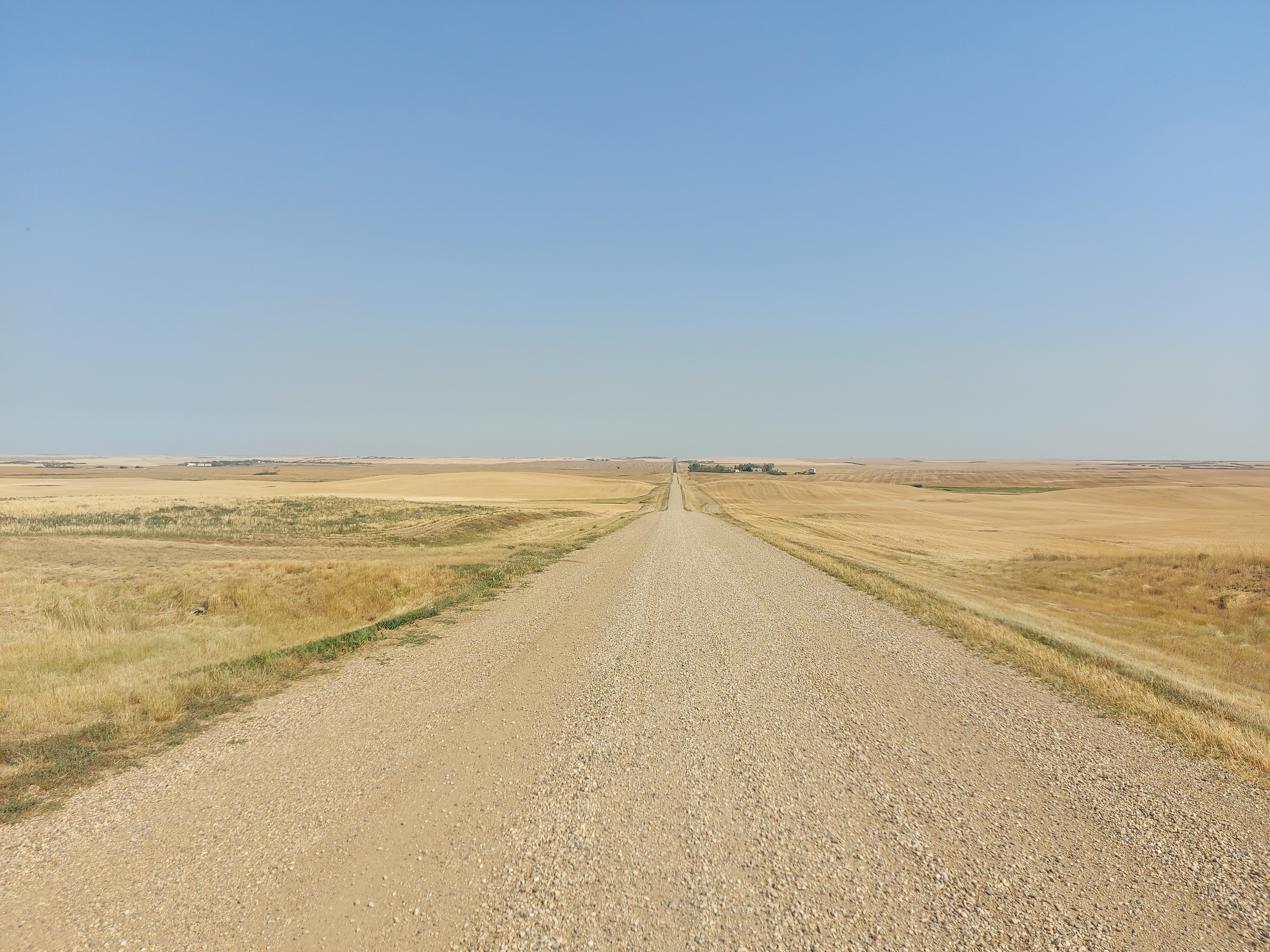
Highway 719 near its western terminus

Highway 719 runs from Highway 358 near Lakenheath east to Highway 2. It is about 23 kilometres (14 mi) long.

== SK 720 ==
Highway 720
- Length: 21 km (13 mi)

Highway 720 runs from Highway 363 near Neidpath to Highway 19 near Flowing Well. It is about 21 kilometres (13 mi) long.

== SK 721 ==
Highway 721
- Length: 54 km (34 mi)

Highway 721 runs from Highway 630 near the Swift Current Creek (northeast of Reid Lake) east to Highway 363 near Hallonquist. Communities accessed from the highway include Wymark, Chortitz, Rheinfeld, and Braddock. It has a 15-kilometre (9.3 mi) concurrency with Highway 379 and intersects Highways 4 and 625. The highway is about 54 kilometres (34 mi) long.

== SK 722 ==
Highway 722
- Length: 51 km (32 mi)

Highway 722 runs from Highway 37 near Shaunavon to Highway 4. It is about 51 kilometres (32 mi) long. Locally the highway is known as "The Little Six" as the westernmost six miles near Shaunavon are paved.

== SK 723 ==
Highway 723
- Length: 22 km (14 mi)

Highway 723 runs from Highway 16 at Bredenbury east to Highway 8. It intersects Highway 80 and is about 22 kilometres (14 mi) long.

== SK 724 ==
Highway 724
- Length: 81 km (50 mi)

Highway 724 runs from Highway 614 west to the Alberta border, where it continues westward as Highway 515. Highway 724 passes near the community of Maple Creek and connects with Highways 21 and 271. It is about 81 kilometres (50 mi) long.

== SK 725 ==
Highway 725
- Length: 19 km (12 mi)

Highway 725 runs from Highway 16 at Saltcoats east to Highway 80. It is about 19 kilometres (12 mi) long.

== SK 726 ==
Highway 726
- Length: 85 km (53 mi)

Highway 726 runs from Highway 651 / Highway 16 near Theodore to Highway 8. Highway 726 passes near the communities of Springside, Ebenezer, and Rhein and connects with Highways 47, 9, 309, and 637. It is about 85 kilometres (53 mi) long.

== SK 727 ==
Highway 727
- Length: 23 km (14 mi)

Highway 727 runs from Highway 640 near Cupar to Highway 56 near Pasqua and Echo Lakes on the Standing Buffalo Indian Reserve. It is about 23 kilometres (14 mi) long.

== SK 728 ==
Highway 728
- Length: 165 km (103 mi)

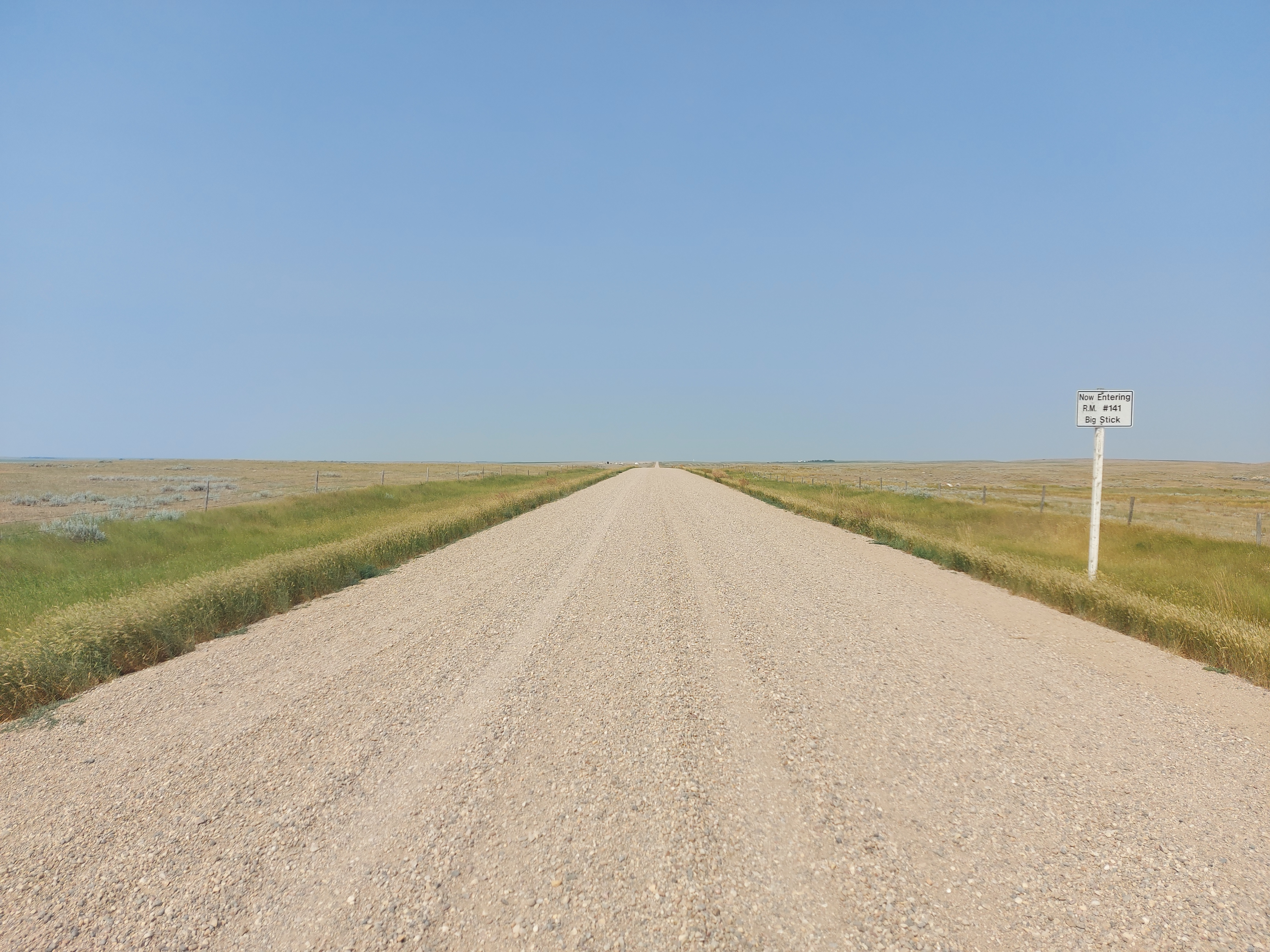
Highway 728 entering the RM of Big Stick No. 141 near Bigstick Lake.

Highway 728 runs from the Alberta border near Surprise, Saskatchewan — where it continues west as Alberta Highway 528 — to Saskatchewan Highway 32 near Cantuar. Highway 728 passes through the communities of Golden Prairie, Nadeauville, and Hazlet. It is about 165 kilometres (103 mi) long.

== SK 729 ==
Highway 729
- Length: 39 km (24 mi)

Highway 729 runs from Highway 20 near Craven east to Highway 640 near Edenwold. The highway provides access to the Hidden Valley Wildlife Refuge. It is about 39 kilometres (24 mi) long.

== SK 730 ==
Highway 730
- Length: 34.1 km (21.2 mi)

Highway 730 runs from Highway 642 near Stony Beach east to Regina, where it becomes Dewdney Avenue at the intersection with Courtney Street. It is about 34 kilometres (21 mi) long.

=== Dewdney Avenue ===
Dewdney Avenue is an east–west collector road in central Regina; it is split into two sections by the Canadian Pacific Railway mainline. It is named after Edgar Dewdney, who was Lieutenant-Governor of the North-West Territories who made the decision to move the territorial capital from Battleford to Regina. Dewdney Avenue begins as a continuation of Highway 730 at the west city limits and passes the Global Transportation Hub and RCMP Academy, Depot Division. East of Lewvan Drive, it passes Evraz Place, which is the site of Mosaic Stadium. Between Albert Street and Broad Street, Dewdney Avenue passes through the Regina's historic Warehouse District, just north of downtown. Dewdney Avenue is split by the CPR mainline, between Toronto Street and Winnipeg Street. East of Winnipeg Street, it continues east as a collector road through residential neighbourhoods.

=== Major intersections ===
Rural municipality	Location	km	mi	Destinations	Notes
Pense No. 160	Stony Beach	0.0	0.0	Highway 642 – Bethune, Belle Plaine	Hwy 730 western terminus
Pense No. 160		13.0	8.1	Highway 641 – Lumsden, Pense	
Sherwood No. 159		26.0	16.2	Range Road 2212 – Grand Coulee	
Sherwood No. 159		27.6 0.0	17.1 0.0	Range Road 2211	Regina city limits; Hwy 730 eastern terminus
City of Regina		1.6	0.99	Fleming Road – Global Transportation Hub	Access to southbound Regina Bypass via Rotary Ave
City of Regina		3.7	2.3	Highway 11 north (Regina Bypass) – Saskatoon	Interchange; southbound exit and northbound entrance; Hwy 11 exit 7
City of Regina		7.4	4.6	McCarthy Boulevard – RCMP Academy (Depot Division)	
City of Regina		9.5	5.9	Lewvan Drive – Regina International Airport	
City of Regina		11.3	7.0	Albert Street (Highway 6) Dewdney Avenue	Dewdney Avenue continues east
1.000 mi = 1.609 km; 1.000 km = 0.621 mi: Incomplete access; Route transition

== SK 731 ==
Highway 731
- Location: McKillop No. 220, Longlaketon No. 219, Cupar No. 218, Touchwood No. 248, Kellross No. 247, Ituna Bon Accord No. 246
- Length: 143.8 km (89.4 mi)

Highway 731 runs from the resort village of Island View on the shores of Last Mountain Lake to Highway 310 near Ituna. It is about 143.8 kilometres (89.4 mi) long. Before 2005, Highway 731 was a much shorter highway that only ran along the section between Hwy 20 at Strasbourg and its intersection with Hwy 641. It was 18 kilometres (11 mi) long.

Hwy 731 begins in the Rural Municipality of McKillop No. 220 near the shores of Last Mountain Lake in the resort village of Island View at the intersection between Island View Road and Marine Drive. It heads east along Island View Road to leave Island View and have an intersection with Range Road 2233, which leads south to Sunset Resort, North Colesdale Park, Colesdale Park, Green Acres, and Spring Bay, before entering the hamlet of Uhl's Bay. The highway joins a short concurrency (overlap) with westbound Hwy 220 on the north side of the hamlet before it splits off and heads north, leaving Uhl's Bay to have an intersection with Township Road 242 (provides access to Collingwood Lakeshore Estates) before making a sharp right onto Township Road 244, heading due east through rural farmland for several kilometres to reach the town of Strasbourg. Hwy 731 has a junction with Hwy 20 and travels along the southern side of town via Erickson Road, crossing a railway before leaving Strasbourg and heading east into the Rural Municipality of Longlaketon No. 219. After travelling just to the south of Last Mountain, it has a junction with Hwy 641 before entering the Rural Municipality of Cupar No. 218 and becoming concurrent with Hwy 6 (CanAm Highway) northbound just south of Gregherd.

The pair head north to enter the Rural Municipality of Touchwood No. 248, with Hwy 731 splitting off and heading due east along Arbury Road shortly thereafter through rural areas for several kilometres before curving northward onto Range Road 2172 at Arbury. It now becomes concurrent with southbound Hwy 640 just south of the George Gordon First Nation, with the pair heading east through farmland for a few kilometres before Hwy 640 splits of and heads south towards Cupar. Hwy 731 travels through Magyar to enter the Rural Municipality of Kellross No. 247, where it has a short concurrency with southbound Hwy 639 and crosses Hwy 35. Crossing into the Rural Municipality of Ituna Bon Accord No. 246 via a switchback, Hwy 731 travels along St. Josephs Road, having an intersection with Range Road 2124 (leads north to Jasmin) before coming to an end just south of Ituna at an intersection with Hwy 310. With the exception of its concurrencies with other paved highways, the entire length of Hwy 731 is a gravel, two-lane highway.

=== Major intersections ===
From west to east:

Rural municipality	Location	km	mi	Destinations	Notes
McKillop No. 220	Island View	0.0	0.0	Island View Road / Marine Drive	Western terminus
McKillop No. 220	Uhl's Bay	1.2	0.75	Range Road 2233 – Sunset Resort, North Colesdale Park, Colesdale, Green Acres, Spring Bay	
McKillop No. 220	Uhl's Bay	2.1	1.3	Highway 220 east – Bulyea	Western end of Hwy 220 wrong-way concurrency
McKillop No. 220	Uhl's Bay	2.6	1.6	Uhl's Street – Uhl's Bay	
McKillop No. 220	Uhl's Bay	3.2	2.0	Highway 220 west – Rowan's Ravine Provincial Park	Eastern end of Hwy 220 wrong-way concurrency
McKillop No. 220		8.9	5.5	Township Road 242 – Collingwood Lakeshore Estates	
McKillop No. 220	Strasbourg	25.3	15.7	Highway 20 – Duval, Bulyea	
Longlaketon No. 219		43.2	26.8	Highway 641 – Semans, Earl Grey	
Cupar No. 218	Gregherd	57.8	35.9	Highway 6 south / CanAm Highway – Southey	Western end of Hwy 6 concurrency
Touchwood No. 248		67.7	42.1	Highway 6 north / CanAm Highway – Raymore	Eastern end of Hwy 6 concurrency
Touchwood No. 248		85.7	53.3	Highway 640 north – George Gordon First Nation, Punnichy	Western end of Hwy 640 concurrency
Touchwood No. 248		92.2	57.3	Highway 640 south – Cupar	Eastern end of Hwy 640 concurrency
Kellross No. 247		103.6	64.4	Highway 639 north – Lestock	Western end of Hwy 639 concurrency
Kellross No. 247		106.9	66.4	Highway 639 south – Dysart	Eastern end of Hwy 639 concurrency
Kellross No. 247		119.9	74.5	Highway 35 – Leross, Lipton	
Ituna Bon Accord No. 246		133.9	83.2	Range Road 2124 – Jasmin	
Ituna Bon Accord No. 246		143.8	89.4	Highway 310 – Ituna, Balcarres	Eastern terminus
1.000 mi = 1.609 km; 1.000 km = 0.621 mi: Concurrency terminus

== SK 732 ==
Highway 732
- Location: Huron No. 223, Craik No. 222, Sarnia No. 221
- Length: 87.7 km (54.5 mi)

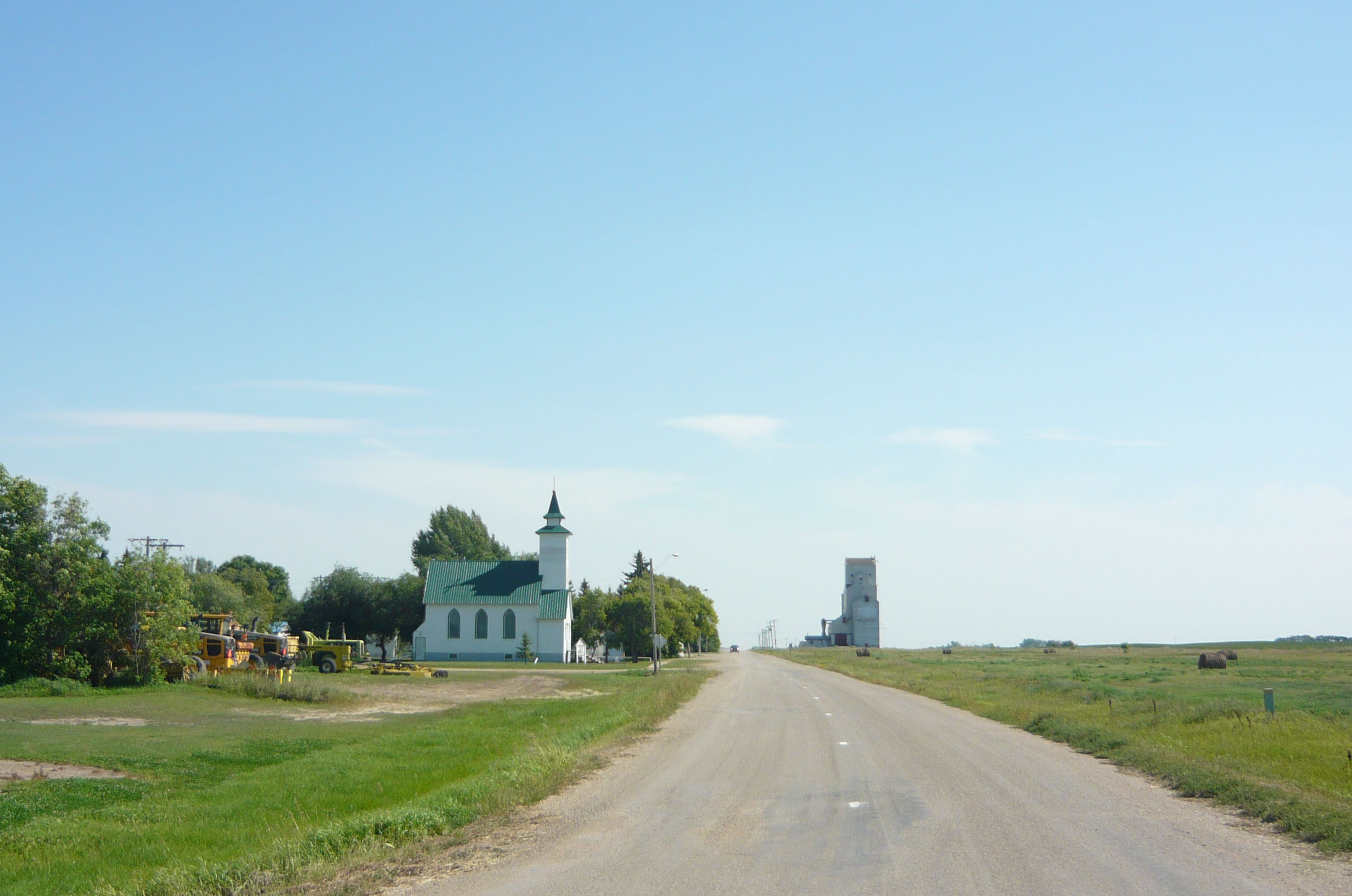
Highway 732 through Holdfast

Highway 732 runs from Highway 627 east to the junction of Highway 354 and Highway 733 in Dilke. The highway crosses both Iskwao Creek and the Arm River, as well as connects with Highways 643 and 11 at Craik, and sharing a concurrency (overlap) with Highway 2 between Penzance and Holdfast. The highway also provides access to Craik and District Regional Park and the community of Sarnia Beach. It is about 87.7 kilometres (54.5 mi) long.

From west to east:

Rural municipality	Location	km	mi	Destinations	Notes
Huron No. 223		0.0	0.0	Highway 627 (Range Road 3023) – Tugaske, Elbow, Girvin	Western terminus
Craik No. 222		19.6	12.2	Bridge over Iskwao Creek	
Craik No. 222		27.4	17.0	Highway 643 (Ferguson Street / Range Road 2283) – Craik, Keeler	
Craik No. 222		28.6	17.8	Crossford Avenue – Craik	Old Hwy 11
Craik No. 222		28.9	18.0	Highway 11 (Louis Riel Trail) – Saskatoon, Regina	
Craik No. 222		29.1	18.1	Range Road 2281 – Craik and District Regional Park	
Craik No. 222		32.5	20.2	Bridge over the Arm River	
Sarnia No. 221		53.5	33.2	Highway 2 north (Veterans Memorial Highway) – Penzance, Prince Albert	Western end of Hwy 2 concurrency
Sarnia No. 221		61.7	38.3	Holdfast access road	
Sarnia No. 221		63.3	39.3	Highway 2 south (Veterans Memorial Highway) – Findlater, Moose Jaw	Eastern end of Hwy 2 concurrency
Sarnia No. 221		65.6– 66.1	40.8– 41.1	Railway Avenue – Holdfast	
Sarnia No. 221		71.2– 71.5	44.2– 44.4	Range Road 2245 – Hendersons Beach	
Sarnia No. 221		78.0	48.5	Range Road 2241 – Sarnia Beach	Hwy 732 turns southward along Range Road 2241
Sarnia No. 221		81.2	50.5	Township Road 230 to Highway 733B – Wee Too Beach, Alice Beach	
Sarnia No. 221	Dilke	87.7	54.5	Highway 732 west (Township Road 222) – Dilke, Chamberlain Highway 354 south (Township Road 222) to Highway 11 – Grandview Beach, Bethune	Eastern terminus; road continues south as Range Road 2241
1.000 mi = 1.609 km; 1.000 km = 0.621 mi: Concurrency terminus

== SK 733 ==
Highway 733
- Location: Craik No. 222, Dufferin No. 190, Sarnia No. 221
- Length: 43.5 km (27.0 mi)

Highway 733 runs from Highway 643 east to Highway 354 at Dilke. The highway runs though Chamberlain, provides access to Lovering Lake Recreation Site, and connects with Highways 2 and 11. It is about 43.5 kilometres (27.0 mi) long.

=== Major intersections ===
From west to east:

Rural municipality	Location	km	mi	Destinations	Notes
Craik No. 222		0.0	0.0	Highway 643 (Township Road 220 / Range Road 2283) – Keeler, Craik	Western terminus; road continues as Hwy 643 south
Craik No. 222		13.8	8.6	Lovering Drive – Lovering Lake Recreation Site	Access road into park
Dufferin No. 190– Sarnia No. 221 boundary		17.9	11.1	Highway 2 south (Veterans Memorial Highway) – Moose Jaw	Western end of Hwy 2 concurrency; western end of paved section
Sarnia No. 221	Chamberlain	19.5	12.1	Highway 2 north / Highway 11 (Louis Riel Trail) – Saskatoon, Regina, Prince Albert	Eastern end of Hwy 2 concurrency
Sarnia No. 221		20.3	12.6	Bridge over the Arm River	
Sarnia No. 221		29.1	18.1	Highway 2 (Veterans Memorial Highway) – Holdfast, Prince Albert, Moose Jaw	Eastern end of paved section
Sarnia No. 221	Dilke	43.5	27.0	Highway 732 west (Range Road 2242) – Sarnia Beach, Holdfast Highway 354 south (Township Road 222) – Bethune	Eastern terminus of both Hwy 733 and Hwy 732; northern terminus of Hwy 354; road continues as southbound Hwy 354
1.000 mi = 1.609 km; 1.000 km = 0.621 mi

=== SK 733B ===
Highway 733B
- Township Road 222, Range Road 2235
- Location: Sarnia No. 221
- Length: 10.6 km (6.6 mi)

Highway 733B is a 10.6-kilometre-long (6.6 mi) east-west auxiliary route of Hwy 733, running from Hwy 354 to the western coastline of Last Mountain Lake, providing access to the lakeside communities of Grandview Beach, Alice Beach, and Wee Too Beach. It is entirely a two-lane gravel road, running along Township Road 222 and Range Road 2235.

Major intersections

From west to east:

Rural municipality	Location	km	mi	Destinations	Notes
Sarnia No. 221		0.0	0.0	Highway 354 (Range Road 2240 / Township Road 222) to Highway 11 – Dilke, Bethune	Western terminus; road continues west as northbound Hwy 354
Sarnia No. 221		1.6	0.99	Township Road 222 – Grandview Beach, Eldora Beach	Hwy 733B turns north along Range Road 2235
Sarnia No. 221	Alice Beach	8.1	5.0	Township Road 230 to Highway 732 – Dilke, Sarnia Beach	
Sarnia No. 221	Alice Beach	8.2	5.1	Marine Drive – Alice Beach	
Sarnia No. 221	Alice Beach	8.9	5.5	Gregory Avenue – Alice Beach	
Sarnia No. 221	Alice Beach	9.4	5.8	Marine Drive – Alice Beach	
Sarnia No. 221	Wee Too Beach	10.6	6.6	Lakeshore Drive / Lockert Street	Northern terminus, road continues north for a short distance to a boat ramp
1.000 mi = 1.609 km; 1.000 km = 0.621 mi

== SK 734 ==
Highway 734
- Location: Lumsden No. 189, Sherwood No. 159, Edenwold No. 158
- Length: 49.6 km (30.8 mi)

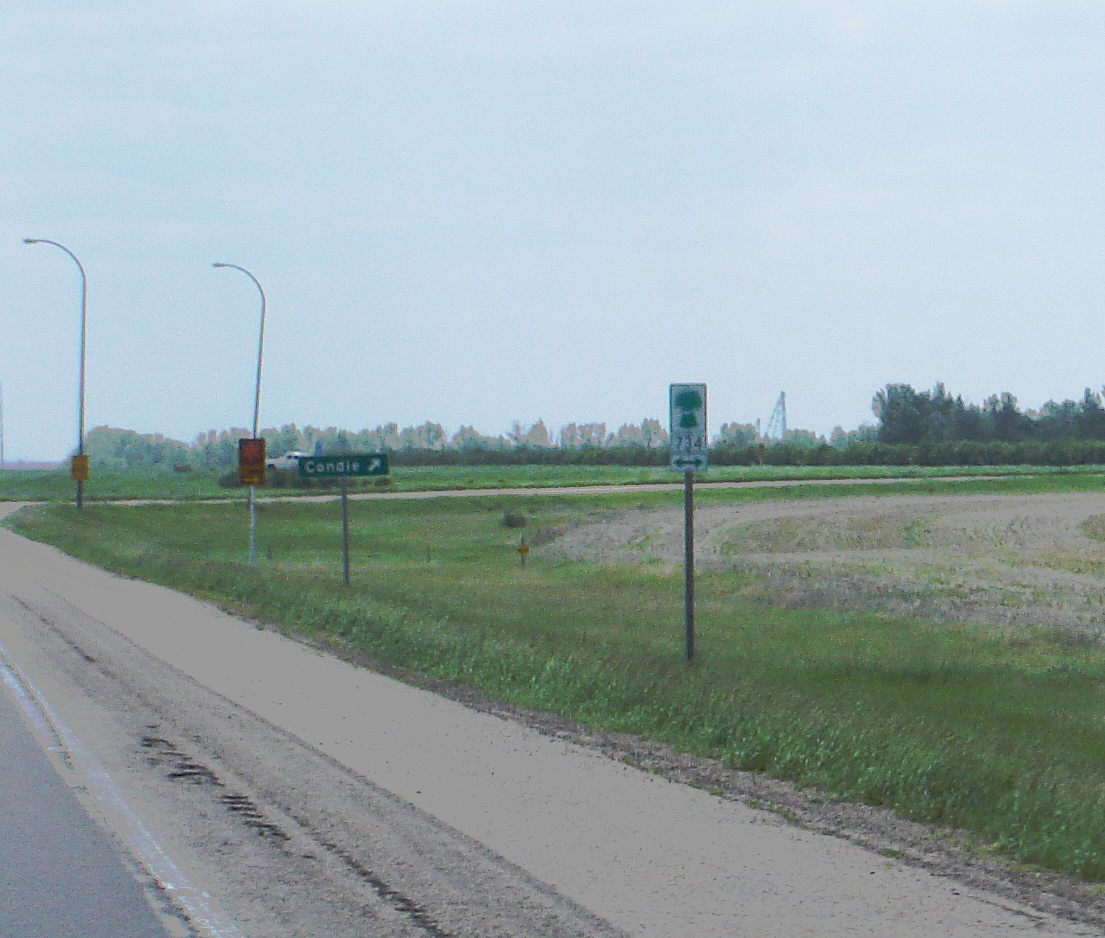
Highway 734 and Condie signs along Highway 11.

Highway 734 runs from Highway 11 near Lumsden to Highway 364. The highway passes near the communities of Brora and Zehner and provides access to Condie Nature Refuge. It is about 50 kilometres (31 mi) long.

=== Major intersections ===
Rural municipality	Location	km	mi	Destinations	Notes
Lumsden No. 189	Lumsden	0.0	0.0	Qu'Appelle Drive / James Street (Highway 641)	Western terminus; follows Qu'Appelle Drive east
Lumsden No. 189– Sherwood No. 159 boundary		16.3	10.1	Crosses Boggy Creek	
Lumsden No. 189– Sherwood No. 159 boundary		17.2	10.7	Condie Road – Condie Nature Refuge	
Lumsden No. 189– Sherwood No. 159 boundary		18.6	11.6	Highway 11 (Louis Riel Trail) – Saskatoon, Regina	At-grade diamond interchange; Highway 11 exit A
Lumsden No. 189– Sherwood No. 159 boundary		23.6	14.7	Range Road 2201 (Pasqua Street)	
Lumsden No. 189– Sherwood No. 159 boundary		25.2	15.7	Highway 6 / CanAm Highway – Melfort, Regina	
Edenwold No. 158	Zehner	36.7	22.8	Highway 624 north – Piapot	West end of Grid Road 624 concurrency
Edenwold No. 158	Zehner	38.1	23.7	Highway 624 south – Pilot Butte	End end of Grid Road 624 concurrency
Edenwold No. 158		49.6	30.8	Highway 364 – Edenwold, Balgonie	Eastern terminus; continues as Township Road 190
1.000 mi = 1.609 km; 1.000 km = 0.621 mi: Concurrency terminus

== SK 735 ==
Highway 735
- Length: 19.5 km (12.1 mi)

Highway 735 runs from Highway 643 south of Caron east to Moose Jaw where it becomes Caribou Street. It provides access to Boharm and is about 20 kilometres (12 mi) long.

== SK 736 ==
Highway 736
- Length: 16 km (9.9 mi)

Highway 736 runs from Highway 4 at Leinan east to Highway 628. It is about 16 kilometres (9.9 mi) long.

== SK 737 ==
Highway 737
- Length: 35.5 km (22.1 mi)

Highway 737 runs from Highway 342 at Beechy to Highway 42 near Greenbrier. It is about 35.5 kilometres (22.1 mi) long.

== SK 738 ==
Highway 738
- Length: 82 km (51 mi)

Highway 738 runs from Highway 32 at Abbey south for about 14.5 kilometres (9.0 mi) then east to Highway 4. Highway 738 connects with Highway 32 twice, the second time at Cabri where it also shares a one-mile concurrency with Highway 37. The highway is about 82 kilometres (51 mi) long.

== SK 739 ==
Highway 739
- Length: 26 km (16 mi)

Highway 739 runs from Highway 2 on the west side of Buffalo Pound Lake east to Highway 11 at Bethune. It is about 26 kilometres (16 mi) long.

== SK 740 ==
Highway 740
- Length: 50 km (31 mi)

Highway 740 runs from Highway 310 east to the junction of Highways 10 and 47 south-west of Melville. It is about 50 kilometres (31 mi) long.

== SK 741 ==
Highway 741
- Length: 45 km (28 mi)

Highway 741 runs from the Alberta border near Empress, Alberta to Highway 21 in Leader. It crosses the South Saskatchewan River via the Estuary Ferry. It is about 45 kilometres (28 mi) long.

Highway 741 was originally designated as part of Provincial Highway 21, which connected Leader with Macklin and Lloydminster. In the 1930s, it was renumbered to Provincial Highway 32 while the north–south section was renumbered to Provincial Highway 17. In the 1940s, Provincial Highway 32 west of Leader was decommissioned, along with the section of Provincial Highway 17 south of Macklin. The route remained unnumbered until the municipal numbering system was established in the early 1980s.

== SK 742 ==
Highway 742
- Length: 31 km (19 mi)

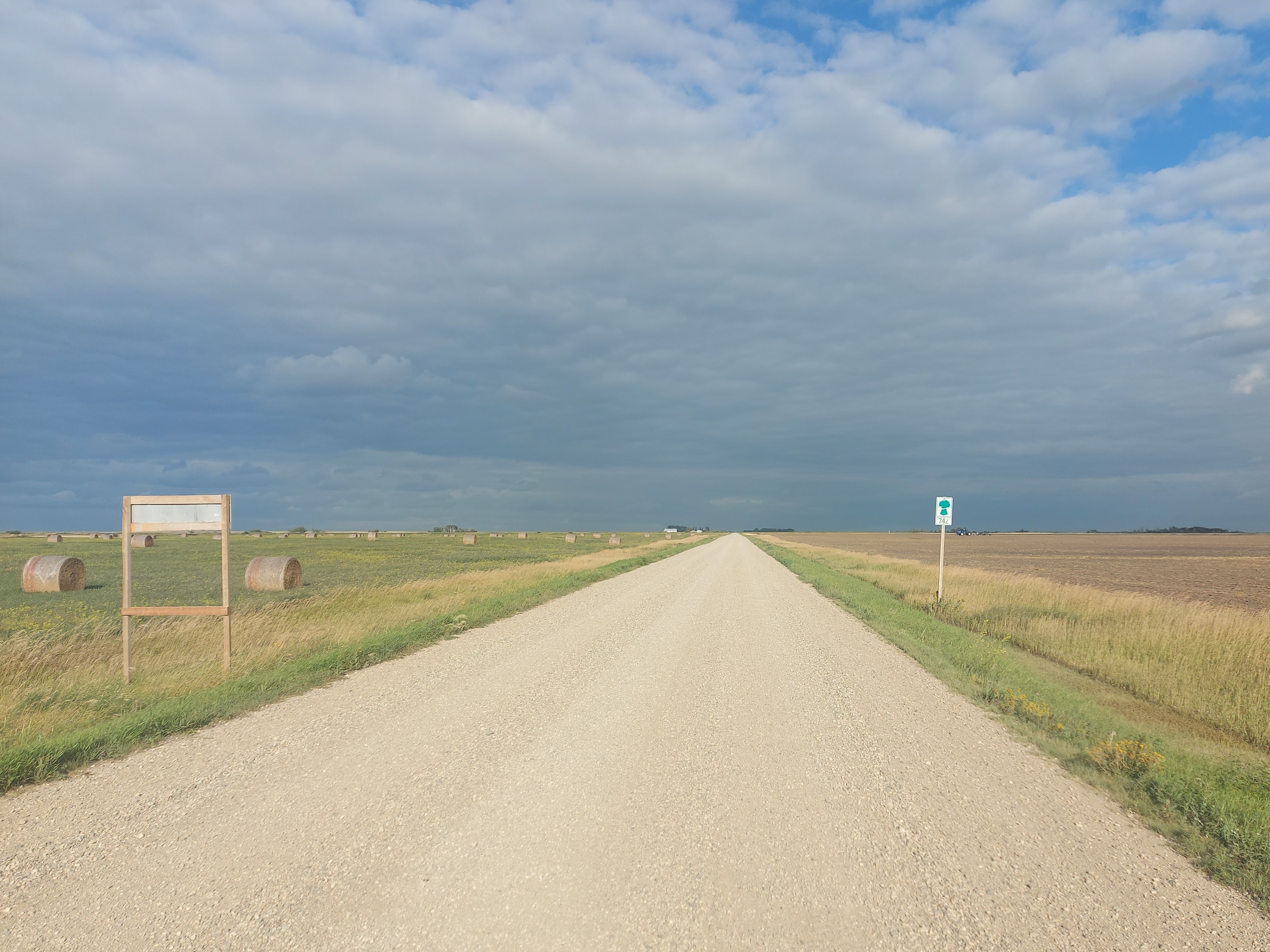
Highway 742

Highway 742 runs from Highway 35 south of Cedoux east to Fillmore at Highway 606. It is about 31 kilometres (19 mi) long.

== SK 743 ==
Highway 743
- Length: 50 km (31 mi)

Highway 743 runs from Highway 640 near Krasne to Highway 310. The highway 743 passes near the communities of Wishart, Bankend, and West Bend and connects with Highways 639 and 35. It is about 50 kilometres (31 mi) long.

== SK 744 ==
Highway 744
- Length: 31 km (19 mi)

Highway 744 runs from 1st Ave E near Nokomis in the RM of Wreford No. 280 east to Highway 6 in the RM of Mount Hope No. 279. It is about 31 kilometres (19 mi) long.

== SK 745 ==
Highway 745
- Length: 20 km (12 mi)

Highway 745 runs from Highway 35 near Elfros to Highway 310. The highway passes by the community of Kristnes. It is about 20 kilometres (12 mi) long.

== SK 746 ==
Highway 746
- Length: 57.2 km (35.5 mi)

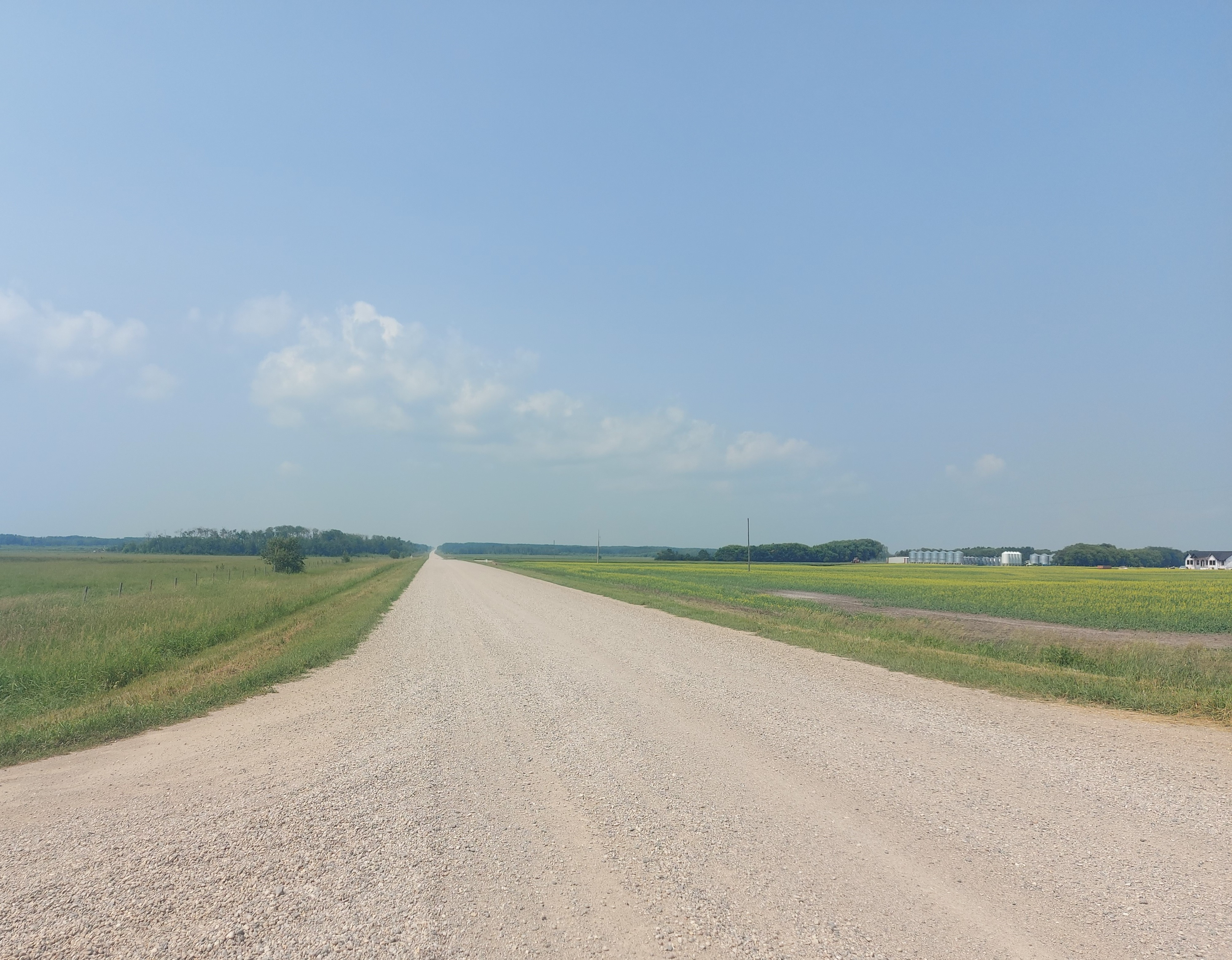
Highway 746's concurrency with Highway 651 north of Canora Beach

Highway 746 runs from Highway 16 at Sheho east to Highway 5 near Canora. From the highway's western terminus at Highway 16, it shares a short 2.7-kilometre (1.7 mi) long concurrency with Highway 617. Highway 617 then heads north and 746 east. North of Goldenvale, Highway 746 begins a 35-kilometre (22 mi) long concurrency with Highway 651 which last until 746's eastern terminus. Along Highway 746's route, it intersects with Highway 47 and runs past the northern end of Good Spirit Lake providing access to Canora Beach. It is about 57 kilometres (35 mi) long.

== SK 747 ==
Highway 747
- Length: 43 km (27 mi)

Highway 747 runs from the Highway 11 / Highway 653 junction near Davidson to Highway 2 near Imperial. It is about 43 kilometres (27 mi) long.

== SK 748 ==
Highway 748
- Length: 37 km (23 mi)

Highway 748 runs from Highway 653 in the RM of McCraney No. 282 east to Simpson at Highway 2 in the RM of Wood Creek No. 281. It is about 37 kilometres (23 mi) long.

== SK 749 ==
Highway 749
- Length: 82 km (51 mi)

Highway 749 runs from Highway 19 near Elbow to Highway 2 near Liberty. The highway runs eastward from Highway 19, and it almost exclusively intersects minor Township Roads and Range Roads for its entire length. It intersects Highway 627 at km 26, and at km 51, it intersects Highway 11 after passing through the hamlet of Girvin. It is about 82 kilometres (51 mi) long.

== SK 750 ==
Highway 750
- Length: 31 km (19 mi)

Highway 750 runs from Highway 4 east to Highway 378 north of Whitkow. It is about 31 kilometres (19 mi) long.

== SK 751 ==
Highway 751
- Length: 44 km (27 mi)

Highway 751 runs from Highway 4 near Elrose east to Highway 42. It is about 44 kilometres (27 mi) long.

== SK 752 ==
Highway 752
- Length: 60 km (37 mi)

Highway 752 runs from Highway 658 north of Snipe Lake to Highway 4 near Elrose. The highway passes near the community of Bickleigh. It is about 60 kilometres (37 mi) long.

== SK 753 ==
Highway 753
- Length: 76 km (47 mi)

Highway 753 runs from Highway 9 near Hinchcliffe east to the Manitoba border where it continues as Provincial Road 275 near Crestview, Manitoba. The highway passes through the communities of Danbury, Arabella, and Whitebeech and intersects Highways 662, 8, and 661. It is about 76 kilometres (47 mi) long.

== SK 754 ==
Highway 754
- Length: 32 km (20 mi)

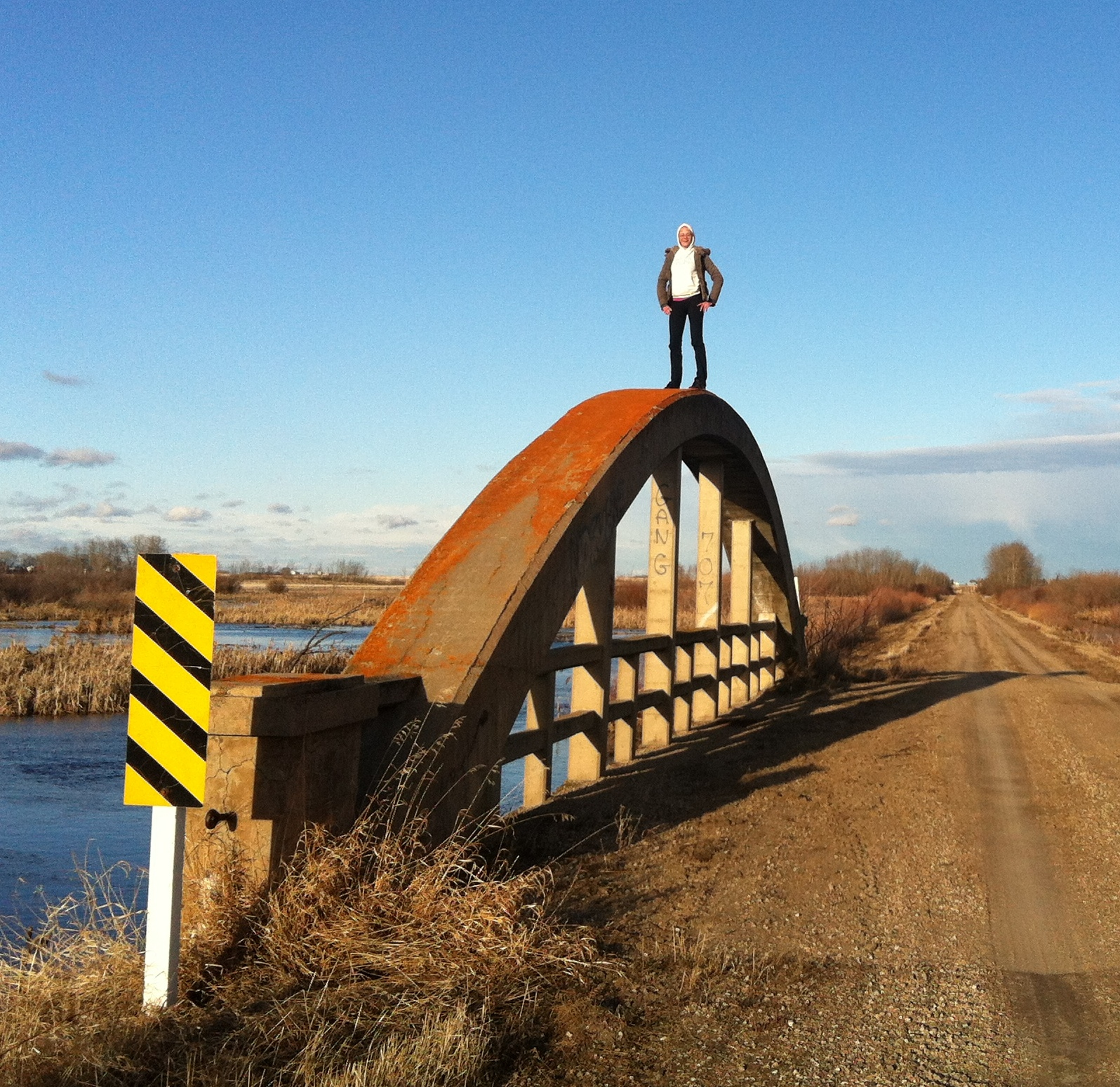
A concrete bridge near Buchanan, Saskatchewan where Spirit Creek crosses Hwy 754.

Highway 754 runs from Highway 9 to Highway 637. The highway becomes Louis Ave through the village of Rama before continuing north from its intersection with Highway 5 to its end point near Hazel Dell. About 3.2 kilometres (2.0 mi) west of Buchanan, the highway crosses Spirit Creek. It is about 32 kilometres (20 mi) long.

== SK 755 ==
Highway 755
- Length: 25 km (16 mi)

Highway 755 runs from the Hazel Dell Access Road near Hazel Dell to Highway 47 near Preeceville. It is about 25 kilometres (16 mi) long.

== SK 756 ==
Highway 756
- Length: 115 km (71 mi)

Highway 756 runs from Highway 20 near Deadmoose Lake east to Highway 38 near Little Nut Lake. It intersects Highways 368, 6, 640, and 35. Communities along the highway include Marysburg, Annaheim, Spalding, and Rose Valley. It also passes through the Yellow Quill Indian reserve. Highway 756 is about 115 kilometres (71 mi) long.

== SK 758 ==
Highway 758
- Length: 29 km (18 mi)

Highway 758, the Hendon Grid Road, runs from Highway 640 near Quill Lake to Highway 35 near Hendon. It is about 29 kilometres (18 mi) long.

== SK 759 ==
Highway 759
- Length: 1.6 km (0.99 mi)

Highway 759 runs from 1st Street South at the village of Endeavour east to Highway 9. It is about 1.6 kilometres (0.99 mi) long.

== SK 760 ==
Highway 760
- Length: 21 km (13 mi)

Highway 760 runs from Highway 35 at Fosston east to Highway 38 near Kelvington. It is about 21 kilometres (13 mi) long.

== SK 761 ==
Highway 761
- Length: 88 km (55 mi)

Highway 761 runs from Highway 668 to Highway 6 near Leroy. The highway passes through town of Lanigan; it also has a spur that links it to Highway 20 in Drake. Access to Leroy Leisureland Regional Park is from Highway 761. It is about 88 kilometres (55 mi) long.

== SK 762 ==
Highway 762
- Length: 29 km (18 mi)

Highway 762 runs from Highway 672 at Vanscoy east then north to Circle Drive in Saskatoon. About 11 kilometres (6.8 mi) east of Vanscoy, Highway 60 intersects the highway. West of Highway 60, Highway 762 is called Vanscoy Road and east of Highway 60 it is called Valley Road, which enters Saskatoon on its south-west side and terminates with an interchange at Circle Drive. Prior to 2013, Valley Road connected with Dundonald Avenue as it entered the city and the highway terminated at an at-grade intersection at 11th Street West. Since the early 2010s the road has provided the main access route to the city's landfill. It is about 29 kilometres (18 mi) long.

== SK 763 ==
Highway 763
- Length: 48 km (30 mi)

Highway 763 runs from Highway 16 concurrent with the Bradwell Access Road south to Bradwell. From Bradwell, it travels east to Zelma where it begins a concurrency with the Zelma Access Road east to Highway 2 just north of Young. The highway also has a 5-kilometre (3.1 mi) concurrency with Highway 397 just west of Allan — the only other community that Highway 763 provides access to. Besides the aforementioned communities, the highway provides access to Bradwell and Zelma Reservoirs. It is about 48 kilometres (30 mi) long.

== SK 764 ==
Highway 764
- Length: 83 km (52 mi)

Highway 764 runs from Highway 219 to Highway 397 / Highway 763 near Allan. Highway 764 heads eastward from Highway 219 as the Hanley Grid Road. Access roads to the town of Hanley are about 26 kilometres (16 mi) from Highway 219, and Highway 764 intersects Highway 11 2 kilometres (1.2 mi) later. At Range Road 3013, Highway 764 shifts northward over the Allan Hills, and through the community of Allan Hills. The highway ends at a three-way junction of Highways 397, 763, and 764. All three highways end at this intersection. Highway 764 is about 83 kilometres (52 mi) long.

== SK 766 ==
Highway 766
- Length: 23 km (14 mi)

Highway 766 runs from Highway 60 near Pike Lake west to Highway 7 at Delisle. About 1.6 kilometres (1 mi) east of Delisle, Highway 766 splits into two directions. The original routing took 766 straight west to Highway 7 on the east side of Delisle. With the four-laning of Highway 7, the intersection was closed and an alternate route for 766 was designated north along Traynor Road to 7 north-east of Delisle. Highway 766 is about 23 kilometres (14 mi) long.

== SK 767 ==
Highway 767
- Length: 45 km (28 mi)

Highway 767 runs from Highway 41 near Smuts to Highway 670 north of Bruno. It is about 45 kilometres (28 mi) long.

== SK 768 ==
Highway 768
- Length: 35 km (22 mi)

Highway 768 runs from Highway 7 near Harris to Highway 4. The highway passes through the community of Valley Centre. The only highway it intersects is Highway 655. It is about 35 kilometres (22 mi).

== SK 769 ==
Highway 769
- Length: 42.4 km (26.3 mi)

Highway 769 runs from Cochin at Highway 4 east to Highway 378, north of Rabbit Lake in the RM of Round Hill No. 467. The highway runs through the Moosomin Indian reserve and intersects Highway 794 at Highway 378. It is about 42.4 kilometres (26.3 mi) long.

== SK 771 ==
Highway 771
- Length: 91.0 km (56.5 mi)

Highway 771 runs from Hwy 680 south of Cosine east to Highway 657, crossing Highway 317 south of Cactus Lake. It intersects Highway 31, runs along the north side of Luseland concurrently with Highway 675, has a 6.4 kilometres (4 mi) concurrency with Highway 21, a 16-kilometre (9.9 mi) concurrency with Highway 374, provides access to Tramping Lake, has a 3.2-kilometre (2.0 mi) concurrency with Highway 659, and crosses Tramping Lake. The highway is about 91.0 kilometres (56.5 mi) long.

== SK 772 ==
Highway 772
- Length: 20 km (12 mi)

Highway 772 runs from Highway 317 near Hoosier to Highway 307 near Smiley. The highway passes through the small community of Dewar Lake. It is about 20 kilometres (12 mi) long.

== SK 773 ==
Highway 773
- Length: 37 km (23 mi)

Highway 773 runs from Highway 38 near Chelan to Highway 35 near McKague. It runs through the Kinistin 91 Indian reserve and crosses the Barrier River. The highway has a 4-kilometre (2.5 mi) long concurrency with Highway 679 near Pré-Ste-Marié. It is about 37 kilometres (23 mi) long.

== SK 774 ==
Highway 774
- Length: 31 km (19 mi)

Highway 774 runs from Highway 17 about 6 kilometres (3.7 mi) north of Lloydminster at the Alberta border east to Highway 684 within the RM of Britannia No. 502. It is about 31 kilometres (19 mi) long.

== SK 776 ==
Highway 776
- Length: 99 km (62 mi)

Highway 776 runs from Highway 41 near Ethelton to Highway 23 near Bjorkdale. The highway intersects Highways 35 and 681. It passes near Flett Springs, Lipsett, Clemens, South Star, Sylvania, and Bensham. It is about 99 kilometres (62 mi) long.

== SK 777 ==
Highway 777
- Length: 119 km (74 mi)

Highway 777 runs from Highway 41 at Alvena to the intersection between the CanAm Highway (Highway 6) and Highway 349 in Naicam. The highway passes through the communities of Cudworth, Middle Lake, and Lake Lenore and provides access to Lucien Lake Regional Park. It intersects Highways 2, 20, and 368. The highway is about 119 kilometres (74 mi) long.

== SK 778 ==
Highway 778
- Length: 73 km (45 mi)

Highway 778 runs from Highway 20 at Crystal Springs to Highway 6 near Lenvale. The highway passes through Kinistino and provides access to Struthers Lake Regional Park. It is about 62 kilometres (39 mi) long.

== SK 779 ==
Highway 779
- Length: 39 km (24 mi)

Highway 779 runs from Highway 26 north of Peerless east to Highway 4 at Dorintosh. The highway skirts the southern boundary of Meadow Lake Provincial Park. It is about 39 kilometres (24 mi) long.

== SK 780 ==
Highway 780
- Length: 19 km (12 mi)

Highway 780 runs from Highway 2 to Highway 55. About 3 kilometres (1.9 mi) from Highway 2, the highway passes through the town of White Star. It is about 19 kilometres (12 mi) long.

== SK 781 ==
Highway 781
- Length: 28 km (17 mi)

Highway 781 runs from Highway 12, near the former Doukhobor village of Petrofka and the Petrofka Recreation Site, west to Highway 685. The highway passes through Orolow and runs near the southern shore of Redberry Lake It is about 28 kilometres (17 mi) long.

== SK 782 ==
Highway 782
- Length: 32.7 km (20.3 mi)

Highway 782 follows the right bank of the South Saskatchewan River, running from Highway 225 near Batoche, through St. Laurent de Grandin (where it meets Highway 783 at the eastern end of the St. Laurent Ferry) and St. Louis, coming to an end at the junction of Highway 2 (Veterans Memorial Highway) and Highway 25. Between the highway's eastern end and St. Louis, it follows a former section of Highway 25. Highway 782 is about 33 kilometres (21 mi) long.

== SK 783 ==
Highway 783
- Length: 54 km (34 mi)

Highway 783 runs from the Hwy 40 / Hwy 786 junction in Marcelin eastward to meet Hwy 792 and cross the North Saskatchewan River by the Wingard Ferry. After traveling through Wingard, the highway jogs southeast for several kilometres to travel through Duck Lake, where it shares a short concurrency with Hwy 212 and has an intersection with Hwy 11 (Louis Riel Trail). The highway now crosses the St. Laurent Ferry over the South Saskatchewan River to enter St. Laurent de Grandin and come to an end at a junction with Hwy 782. It is about 54 kilometres (34 mi) long.

== SK 784 ==
Highway 784
- Length: 190 km (120 mi)

Highway 784 runs from Highway 29 near Wilkie to Highway 41 near Aberdeen. The highway passes near the communities of Cando, Struan, Dalmeny, and Warman. East of Warman, the road crosses the South Saskatchewan River by the Clarkboro Ferry. It is about 190 kilometres (120 mi) long.

=== Major intersections ===
West to east:

Rural municipality	Location	km	mi	Destinations	Notes
Buffalo No. 409	Wilkie	0.0	0.0	Highway 29 to Highway 14 – The Battlefords, Unity, Biggar	Western terminus
Buffalo No. 409–Battle River No. 438 boundary	Mosquito 109	29.3	18.2	Highway 656 north	
Buffalo No. 409–Battle River No. 438 boundary	Red Pheasant 108	40.3	25.0	Highway 4 north – The Battlefords	West end of Highway 4 concurrency
Rosemount No. 378	Cando	48.2	30.0	Highway 656 south – Landis	
Glenside No. 377		66.7	41.4	Highway 4 south – Biggar	East end of Highway 4 concurrency; west end of Lizard Lake Road
Eagle Creek No. 376		93.5	58.1	Highway 376 north – Maymont	West end of Highway 376 concurrency; east end of Lizard Lake Road
Eagle Creek No. 376	Struan	96.0	59.7	Highway 376 south – Asquith	East end of Highway 376 concurrency; west end of Struan Grid Road
Corman Park No. 344		128.2	79.7	Highway 672 north	West end of Highway 672 concurrency
Corman Park No. 344		130.5	81.1	Highway 672 south – Grandora, Vanscoy	East end of Highway 672 concurrency
Corman Park No. 344		144.9	90.0	Highway 16 (TCH/YH) – Langham, The Battlefords, Saskatoon	East end of Struan Grid Road
Corman Park No. 344		152.7	94.9	Highway 305 – Dalmeny, Langham, Warman Highway 684 south (Dalemny Road)	Continues as Highway 305 east
Gap in route
Corman Park No. 344	Warman	169.1	105.1	Highway 11 (Louis Riel Trail) – Prince Albert	Highway 11 northbound right-in/right-out
Corman Park No. 344		171.3	106.4	Range Road 3044 to Highway 11 west / Highway 305 – Warman, Saskatoon	
South Saskatchewan River		176.4	109.6	Clarkboro Ferry	
Aberdeen No. 373	Aberdeen	177.5	110.3	Highway 785 – Hague Ferry	Alternate access to Highway 41 west
Aberdeen No. 373	Aberdeen	189.7	117.9	Highway 41 – Wakaw, Saskatoon Highway 27 east – Vonda	Eastern terminus; continues as Highway 27
1.000 mi = 1.609 km; 1.000 km = 0.621 mi: Concurrency terminus; Incomplete access

== SK 785 ==
Highway 785
- Length: 53 km (33 mi)

Highway 785 runs from Highway 12 near Hepburn to Highway 41 near Aberdeen. The highway passes near Hague and it connects with Highways 11 and 784. Highway 785 crosses the South Saskatchewan River by the Hague Ferry. It is about 53 kilometres (33 mi) long.

== SK 786 ==
Highway 786
- Length: 14 km (8.7 mi)

Highway 786 runs from Highway 12 to Highway 40 and Highway 783 in Marcelin. It is about 14 kilometres (8.7 mi) long.

== SK 787 ==
Highway 787
- Length: 100 km (62 mi)

Highway 787 runs from Highway 29 to the Senlac Access Road near Senlac. The highway passes near the communities of Cloan, Swarthmore, Winter, and Rutland and connects with Highways 21 and 675. It is about 100 km (62 mi) long.

== SK 788 ==
Highway 788
- Length: 16 km (9.9 mi)

Highway 788 runs from Highway 693 until it transitions into Highway 355. The highway passes near the town of Deer Ridge. It is about 16 kilometres (9.9 mi) long.

== SK 789 ==
Highway 789
- Length: 171 km (106 mi)

Highway 789 runs from Highway 3 within the Muskoday First Nation to Highway 690 near Connell Creek. The highway passes near the communities of Brockington, Gronlid, Codette, and Carrot River. It has a 15 km (9.3 mi) concurrency with Highway 6 and a 7 km (4.3 mi) concurrency with Highway 23. The highway is about 171 kilometres (106 mi) long.

== SK 790 ==
Highway 790
- Length: 59 km (37 mi)

Highway 790 is split into two sections — one in the west-central part of the province and the other in the east-central. The eastern section of highway is 28 kilometres (17 mi) long and runs from Highway 6 south of Choiceland east to Old Highway 35 (Range Road 150) near Nipawin. It passes through the unincorporated community of Cherry Ridge. The western segment is 31 kilometres (19 mi) long and begins at Highway 695 and then runs east through Ahtahkakoop Indian reserve en route to Highway 55 north-east of Canwood.

== SK 791 ==
Highway 791
- Length: 14 km (8.7 mi)

Highway 791 runs from Highway 120 to Paddockwood, where it becomes the Paddockwood Access Road. It is about 14 kilometres (8.7 mi) long.

== SK 792 ==
Highway 792
- Length: 57.7 km (35.9 mi)

Highway 792 begins at Hwy 12 on the eastern edge of the Thickwood Hills, heading southeast past Royal Lake and the Muskeg Lake Cree Nation to have a short concurrency with Hwy 40 in Leask. The highway continues east for several kilometers before turning south through Silver Grove and coming to an end at a junction with Hwy 783 near the Wingard Ferry. Hwy 792 is about 57.7 kilometres (35.9 mi) long.

== SK 793 ==
Highway 793
- Length: 51 km (32 mi)

Highway 793 runs from Highway 24 near Leoville to Highway 55 near Debden. The highway provides access to Morin Lake Regional Park and passes through or near the communities of Ormeaux and Victoire. It also passes through the Big River Indian Reserve and intersects Highway 695. It is about 51 kilometres (32 mi) long.

== SK 794 ==
Highway 794
- Length: 98 km (61 mi)

Highway 794 runs from Highway 26 at Mervin east to Highway 378 near Rabbit Lake. The highway passes through the communities of Daysville, Longhope, Robinhood, Medstead, and Glenbush and intersects Highways 697, 4, and 769. The section from Mervin east to Highway 4 is called Mervin Road and the section from Highway 4 east to Robinhood is called Robinhood Road. Highway 794 is about 98 kilometres (61 mi) long.

== SK 795 ==
Highway 795
- Length: 47 km (29 mi)

Highway 795 runs from Highway 26 to Turtle Lake South Bay, where it transitions into the Turtle Lake Access Road. The highway intersects Highway 796 and passes through or near the communities of Stowlea, Bright Sand, Powm Beach, Aspen Cove, Livelong, and Turtle Lake South Bay and provides access to Brightsand Lake Regional Park. It is about 47 kilometres (29 mi) long.

== SK 796 ==
Highway 796
- Length: 26 km (16 mi)

Highway 796 runs from Highway 26 near Spruce Lake to Highway 795 near Aspen Cove and Parkland Beach on Turtle Lake. The highway connects with an access road to Crystal-Bay Sunset on Brightsand Lake. It is about 26 kilometres (16 mi) long.

== SK 797 ==
Highway 797
- Length: 30 km (19 mi)

Highway 797 runs from Frenchman Butte, taking over from the Frenchman Butte Access Road, to Highway 17 at the Alberta border. The highway passes near Fort Pitt, and the community of Harlan is accessible from the highway. It is about 30 kilometres (19 mi) long.

== SK 798 ==
Highway 798
- Length: 28 km (17 mi)

Highway 798 runs from Highway 684 to Highway 17 on the Alberta border. The highway passes near the town of Hillmond and also intersects Highway 675. It is about 28 kilometres (17 mi) long.

== SK 799 ==
Highway 799
- Length: 23 km (14 mi)

Highway 799 runs from Highway 4 south of the city of Meadow Lake to Highway 698. The highway runs through Cabana and south of Meadow Lake, traversing predominantly rural regions. The highway is used by commercial vehicles for access to industrial sites in the region. It is about 23 kilometres (14 mi) long.

Highway 799 was constructed in the 1940s, and originally ran from the Alberta border in the west to Highway 9 in the east. In the 1960s, the western section was renumbered as part of Highway 5, leaving the current route of Highway 799 in place.

== See also ==
- List of Saskatchewan municipal roads (600–699)
- List of Saskatchewan provincial highways
- Roads in Saskatchewan
