= Saskatchewan Highway 27 =

Provincial highway in Saskatchewan, Canada

Highway 27
- Highway 27 highlighted in red

Route information
- Maintained by Ministry of Highways and Infrastructure
- Length: 33.9 km (21.1 mi)

Major junctions
- West end: Highway 41 at Aberdeen
- East end: Highway 2 near Prud'homme

Location
- Country: Canada
- Province: Saskatchewan
- Rural municipalities: Aberdeen, Grant, Bayne

Highway system
- Provincial highways in Saskatchewan
← Highway 26	→ Highway 28

Highway 27 is a provincial highway in the Canadian province of Saskatchewan. The highway runs from Highway 41 west of Aberdeen east to Highway 2 (Veterans Memorial Highway) near the western shore of Muskiki Lake. It is about 34 kilometres (21 mi) long.

The highway provides access to Prud'homme and Vonda.

== History ==
The present-day Highway 27 is part of the original Provincial Highway 5 alignment, a trans-provincial highway that travelled from Manitoba to Alberta and crossed the South Saskatchewan River via ferry, while Provincial Highway 27 connected Aberdeen with Saskatoon. In the late 1940s, the highway 5 and 27 designations were switched so that Provincial Highway 5 passed through Saskatoon.

== Major intersections ==
From west to east:

Rural municipality	Location	km	mi	Destinations	Notes
Aberdeen No. 473	Aberdeen	0.0	0.0	Highway 784 west to Highway 785 – Clarkboro Ferry, Hague Ferry Highway 41 – Saskatoon, Wakaw, Melfort	Western terminus; continues as Hwy 784
Grant No. 372	Vonda	11.0	6.8	Highway 671 north	West end of Hwy 671 concurrency
Grant No. 372	Vonda	11.8	7.3	Highway 671 south – St. Denis	East end of Hwy 671 concurrency
Grant No. 372	Prud'homme	25.7	16.0	Government Road	
Bayne No. 371		33.9	21.1	Highway 2 – Prince Albert, Wakaw, Watrous, Moose Jaw	Eastern terminus
1.000 mi = 1.609 km; 1.000 km = 0.621 mi: Concurrency terminus

== See also ==
- Transportation in Saskatchewan
- Roads in Saskatchewan
