= Rural Municipality of Ituna Bon Accord No. 246 =

Rural municipality in Saskatchewan, Canada

Ituna Bon Accord No. 246
- Rural municipality
- Rural Municipality of Ituna Bon Accord No. 246
- Location of the RM of Ituna Bon Accord No. 246 in Saskatchewan
- Coordinates: 51.205°N 103.501°W
- Country: Canada
- Province: Saskatchewan
- Census division: 10
- SARM division: 4
- Formed: January 1, 1913

Government
  - Reeve: Edward Datchko
  - Governing body: RM of Ituna Bon Accord No. 246 Council
  - Administrator: Wilma Hrenyk
  - Office location: Ituna

Area (2016)
  - Land: 837.23 km^{2} (323.26 sq mi)

Population (2016)
  - Total: 374
  - Density: 0.4/km^{2} (1.0/sq mi)
- Time zone: CST
  - Summer (DST): CST
- Area codes: 306 and 639

The Rural Municipality of Ituna Bon Accord No. 246 (2016 population: 374) is a rural municipality (RM) in the Canadian province of Saskatchewan within Census Division No. 10 and SARM Division No. 4.

== History ==
The RM of Ituna Bon Accord No. 246 incorporated as a rural municipality on January 1, 1913.

== Geography ==
=== Communities and localities ===
The following urban municipalities are surrounded by the RM.

Towns

- Ituna

Villages

- Hubbard

The following unincorporated communities are within the RM.

Localities

- Jasmin

== Demographics ==
Population history (1981–2016)
Year	Pop.	±%
1981	842	—
1986	734	−12.8%
1991	631	−14.0%
1996	559	−11.4%
2001	532	−4.8%
2006	453	−14.8%
2011	435	−4.0%
2016	374	−14.0%
Source: Statistics Canada via Saskatchewan Bureau of Statistics

In the 2021 Census of Population conducted by Statistics Canada, the RM of Ituna Bon Accord No. 246 had a population of 327 living in 138 of its 148 total private dwellings, a change of −12.6% from its 2016 population of 374. With a land area of 788.73 km^{2} (304.53 sq mi), it had a population density of 0.4/km^{2} (1.1/sq mi) in 2021.

In the 2016 Census of Population, the RM of Ituna Bon Accord No. 246 recorded a population of 374 living in 145 of its 158 total private dwellings, a −14% change from its 2011 population of 435. With a land area of 837.23 km^{2} (323.26 sq mi), it had a population density of 0.4/km^{2} (1.2/sq mi) in 2016.

== Ituna & District Regional Park ==
Ituna & District Regional Park (51.1575°N 103.4899°W) is an 80-acre regional park located about 1 kilometre (0.62 mi) south of the town of Ituna. The park, which was founded in 1966, has a 9-hole golf course, campground, junior Olympic-size swimming pool, 18-hole disc golf, beach volleyball, and baseball diamonds.

The campground has 19 campsites with electric hookups and eight non-electric. All campsites have picnic tables, barbecues, access to potable water, and modern washrooms and showers, which are available in the swimming pool building.

The golf course has two artificial greens and nine sand greens. It is a par 34 with 2,335 total yards.

== Government ==
The RM of Ituna Bon Accord No. 246 is governed by an elected municipal council and an appointed administrator that meets on the second Tuesday of every month. The reeve of the RM is Edward Datchko while its administrator is Wilma Hrenyk. The RM's office is located in Ituna.

== Transportation ==
- Saskatchewan Highway 15
- Saskatchewan Highway 52
- Saskatchewan Highway 310
- Saskatchewan Highway 731
- Canadian National Railway
- Ituna Airport

== See also ==
- List of rural municipalities in Saskatchewan
