= Rural Municipality of Pense No. 160 =

Rural municipality in Saskatchewan, Canada

Pense No. 160
- Rural municipality
- Rural Municipality of Pense No. 160

- Location of the RM of Pense No. 160 in Saskatchewan
- Coordinates: 50.493°N 105.145°W
- Country: Canada
- Province: Saskatchewan
- Census division: 6
- SARM division: 2
- Formed: January 1, 1913

Government
  - Reeve: Tom Lemon
  - Governing body: RM of Pense No. 160 Council
  - Administrator: Cathy Ripplinger
  - Office location: Pense

Area (2016)
  - Land: 841.48 km^{2} (324.90 sq mi)

Population (2016)
  - Total: 508
  - Density: 0.6/km^{2} (1.6/sq mi)
- Time zone: CST
  - Summer (DST): CST
- Area codes: 306 and 639

The Rural Municipality of Pense No. 160 (2016 population: 508) is a rural municipality (RM) in the Canadian province of Saskatchewan within Census Division No. 6 and SARM Division No. 2. It is located in the southeast portion of the province.

== History ==
The RM of Pense No. 160 incorporated as a rural municipality on January 1, 1913. Prior to incorporation, the RM had its beginnings in 1897 with a single township having been formed as a local improvement district (LID). In 1904, small LIDs made way for larger LIDs formed in accordance with the LID Ordinance of 1903. The larger LID No. 160 ultimately preceded the formation of the RM of Pense No. 160. In 1923, the population of the RM of Pense No. 160 had risen 2,227 residents.

== Geography ==
Nicolle Flats Nature Area (Buffalo Pound Provincial Park) is located in the RM as well. The burrowing owl (athene cunicularia), an endangered animal, makes its home in this area. Bigmouth buffalo (ictiobus cyprinellus) is of special concern in this ecoregion.

=== Communities and localities ===
The following urban municipalities are surrounded by the RM.

Towns

- Pense

Villages

- Belle Plaine

The following unincorporated communities are within the RM.

Localities

- Cottonwood
- Eastview
- Kalium
- Keystown
- Madrid
- Pattee
- Schulerville
- Stelcam
- Stony Beach
- Stony Beach Airport

== Demographics ==
Population history (1981–2016)
Year	Pop.	±%
1981	575	—
1986	565	−1.7%
1991	559	−1.1%
1996	536	−4.1%
2001	494	−7.8%
2006	490	−0.8%
2011	471	−3.9%
2016	508	+7.9%
Source: Statistics Canada via Saskatchewan Bureau of Statistics

In the 2021 Census of Population conducted by Statistics Canada, the RM of Pense No. 160 had a population of 441 living in 144 of its 157 total private dwellings, a change of −13.2% from its 2016 population of 508. With a land area of 840.18 km^{2} (324.40 sq mi), it had a population density of 0.5/km^{2} (1.4/sq mi) in 2021.

In the 2016 Census of Population, the RM of Pense No. 160 recorded a population of 508 living in 158 of its 189 total private dwellings, a 7.9% change from its 2011 population of 471. With a land area of 841.48 km^{2} (324.90 sq mi), it had a population density of 0.6/km^{2} (1.6/sq mi) in 2016.

== Government ==
The RM of Pense No. 160 is governed by an elected municipal council and an appointed administrator that meets on the second Wednesday of every month. The reeve of the RM is Tom Lemon while its administrator is Cathy Ripplinger. The RM's office is located in Pense.

== Infrastructure ==
Within this RM are 600 km (370 mi) of roads of which the Highway 1 (the Trans-Canada Highway) is one of the main roads.

== Education ==
This rural municipality was home to several one room school districts such as Leamington, Rose Park, Eastview, Fairville, Coulee, Stony Beach, Rocky Lake, Sarawak, Bruceville, Wayside, Kenilworth, Cottonwood, Wellington, Broadway, Coventry, Blink Bonny, Wascana and Fosest. These have been replaced by consolidated schools and the larger school divisions of today.
