= Prud'homme, Saskatchewan =

Village in Saskatchewan, Canada

Prud'homme
- Village
- Village of Prud'homme
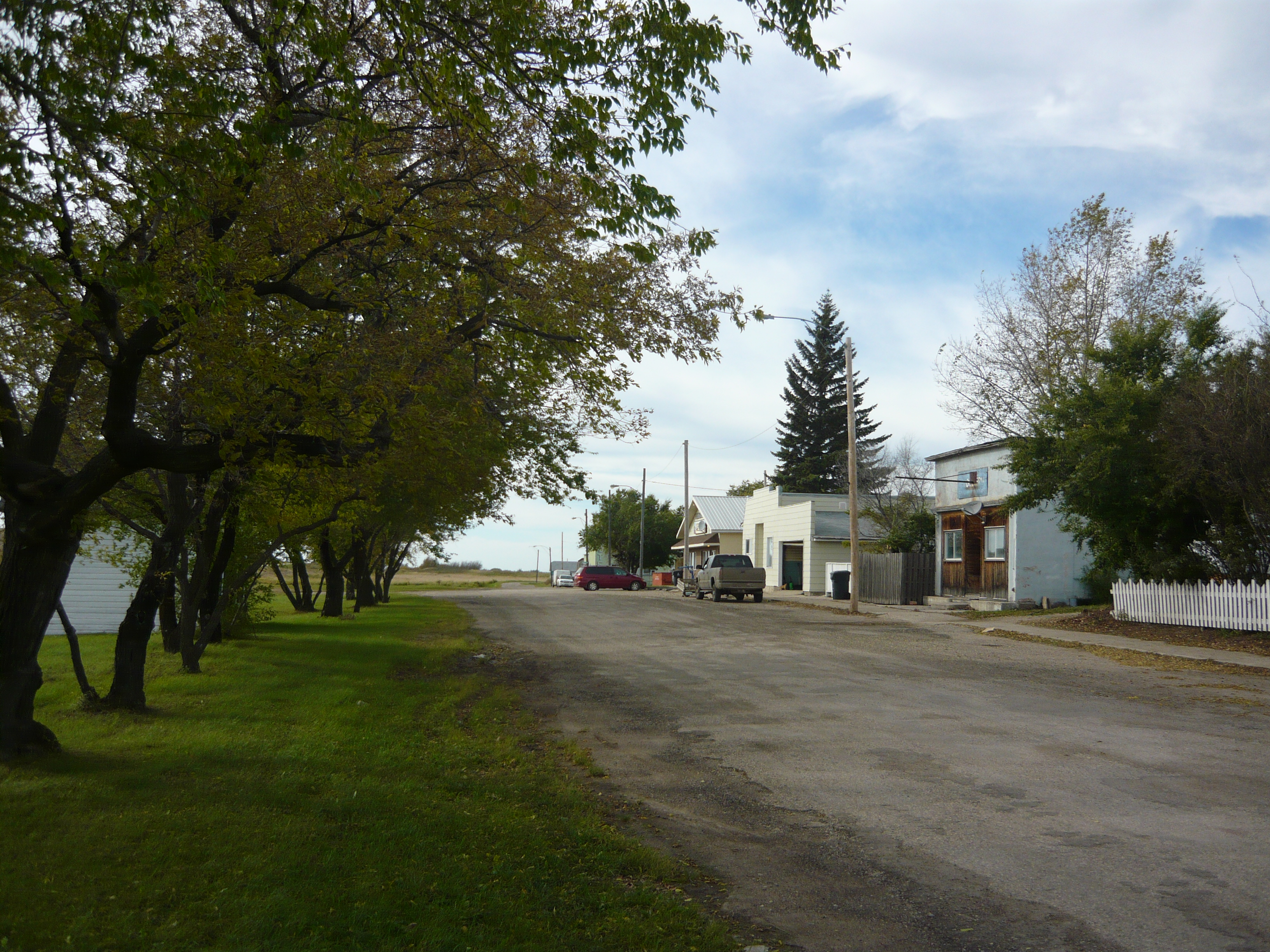
- Railway Avenue

- Location within Saskatchewan Location within Canada
- Coordinates: 52.337°N 105.893°W
- Country: Canada
- Province: Saskatchewan
- Region: Saskatchewan
- Census division: 15
- Rural Municipality: Bayne
- Post office Founded: February 1, 1906
- Incorporated (Village): 1908
- Named for: Joseph H. Prud'homme

Government
  - Mayor: Stacey Wutzke
  - Administrator: Cathy Johnston
  - Governing body: Prud'homme Village Council

Area
  - Total: 0.84 km^{2} (0.32 sq mi)

Population (2006)
  - Total: 167
  - Density: 198.7/km^{2} (515/sq mi)
- Time zone: CST
- Postal code: S0K 3K0
- Area code: 306
- Highways: Highway 27
- Website: Official website

Prud'homme (/pruːˈdoʊm/; 2016 population: 167) is a village in the Canadian province of Saskatchewan within the Rural Municipality of Bayne No. 371 and Census Division No. 15. It is approximately 60 kilometres (37 mi) northeast of Saskatoon. Prud'homme was first known by the name of Bluebell Ranch, then Lally Siding. In 1905 the Canadian Northern Railway came through and renamed it Marcotte's Crossing; two years later it became known as Howell; and finally, in 1922, it was named after the Suffragan Bishop of Prince-Albert–Saskatoon, Joseph H. Prud'homme. The community is mostly based on agriculture. It was home to famous 1930’s singer Barry Boden.

== History ==
Prud'homme incorporated as a village on November 15, 1922.

== Demographics ==
Population history (1981–2016)
Year	Pop.	±%
1981	222	—
1986	220	−0.9%
1991	184	−16.4%
1996	224	+21.7%
2001	203	−9.4%
2006	167	−17.7%
2011	172	+3.0%
2016	167	−2.9%
Source: Statistics Canada via Saskatchewan Bureau of Statistics

In the 2021 Census of Population conducted by Statistics Canada, Prud'homme had a population of 177 living in 75 of its 87 total private dwellings, a change of 6% from its 2016 population of 167. With a land area of 0.79 km^{2} (0.31 sq mi), it had a population density of 224.1/km^{2} (580.3/sq mi) in 2021.

In the 2016 Census of Population, the Village of Prud'homme recorded a population of 167 living in 71 of its 78 total private dwellings, a −3% change from its 2011 population of 172. With a land area of 0.84 km^{2} (0.32 sq mi), it had a population density of 198.8/km^{2} (514.9/sq mi) in 2016.

== Notable people ==
- Maurice Baudoux, Archbishop of Saint-Boniface
- Anthony Bidulka, author
- Jeanne Sauvé, Governor General of Canada 1984–1990, first woman in this office

== See also ==
- List of communities in Saskatchewan
- List of francophone communities in Saskatchewan
- List of villages in Saskatchewan
