= Jasmin, Saskatchewan =

Community in Saskatchewan, Canada

Jasmin
- Unincorporated community
- Location within Saskatchewan Location within Canada
- Coordinates: 51°13′42″N 103°38′46″W
- Country: Canada
- Province: Saskatchewan
- Region: East Central
- Census division: 10
- Rural municipality: Ituna Bon Accord No. 246

Population (2011)
  - Total: 5
  - Density: 17.6/km^{2} (46/sq mi)
- Time zone: CST
- Area code: 306
- Highways: Highway 15

Jasmin is an unincorporated community in the Canadian province of Saskatchewan. Listed as a designated place by Statistics Canada, the community had a population of 5 in the Canada 2011 Census.

== Demographics ==
Canada census – Jasmin, Saskatchewan community profile

	2011
Population	5 (0.0% from 2006)
Land area	0.28 km^{2} (0.11 sq mi)
Population density	17.6/km^{2} (46/sq mi)
Median age	N/A (M: N/A, F: N/A)
Private dwellings	3 (total)
Median household income	$N/A

References: 2011

== See also ==
- List of communities in Saskatchewan
