= Ituna =

Town in Saskatchewan, Canada

Town of Ituna
- Town
- Location of Ituna Town of Ituna (Canada)
- Coordinates: 51°10′05″N 103°29′54″W
- Country: Canada
- Province: Saskatchewan
- Census division: No. 10
- Rural Municipality: Ituna Bon Accord
- Post office founded: 1909
- Incorporated (village): N/A
- Incorporated (Town): 1910

Government
  - Mayor: Rene Dubreuil
  - Town Manager: N/A
  - Governing body: Ituna Town Council

Area
  - Total: 1.56 km^{2} (0.60 sq mi)

Population (2021)
  - Total: 726
  - Density: 465/km^{2} (1,210/sq mi)
- Time zone: UTC−06:00 (CST)
- Postal code: S0A 1N0
- Area code: 306
- Highways: Highway
- Website: www.ituna.ca

Ituna (/aɪˈtjuːnə/) is a town in Saskatchewan, Canada. In 2006, it had a population of 622. It is 165 kilometres (103 mi) north-east of the capital Regina.

The town contains several businesses serving the local residents and rural community, including financial services, grocery stores, restaurant, and a hotel. The Ituna Theatre, built in 1946, is one of few remaining small town movie theatres still in operation. About 1 kilometre (0.62 mi) south of town is the Ituna & District Regional Park, which has a campground and a 9-hole golf course.

== History ==
Ituna has one registered historical site, the Red Brick Schoolhouse that was constructed in 1920 as a composite school for the Fruitville School District. The school build was closed in 1980 when the town school moved into a new building.

== Demographics ==
In the 2021 Census of Population conducted by Statistics Canada, Ituna had a population of 726 living in 350 of its 401 total private dwellings, a change of 3.6% from its 2016 population of 701. With a land area of 1.47 km^{2} (0.57 sq mi), it had a population density of 493.9/km^{2} (1,279.1/sq mi) in 2021.

== Transportation ==
The community is served by Ituna Airport which is located 2.6 nautical miles (4.8 km) southeast.

== See also ==
- List of communities in Saskatchewan
- List of towns in Saskatchewan
