= Hague Ferry =

Coordinates: 52.492°N 106.284°W

The Hague Ferry is a cable ferry in the Canadian province of Saskatchewan. The ferry crosses the South Saskatchewan River, as part of Highway 785 near Hague.

The six car ferry is operated by the Saskatchewan Ministry of Highways and Infrastructure. The ferry is free of tolls and operates between 7:00 am and midnight, during the ice-free season. The ferry has a length of 16.7 metres (55 ft), a width of 5.8 metres (19 ft), and a load limit of 15 tonnes (15 long tons; 17 short tons).

The ferry transports approximately 10,000 vehicles a year.

== See also ==
- List of crossings of the South Saskatchewan River
- Ministry of Highways and Infrastructure
- Transportation in Saskatchewan
