= Hazel Dell, Saskatchewan =

Hamlet

Coordinates: 51°58′39″N 102°58′34″W

Hazel Dell is a hamlet in the Canadian province of Saskatchewan.

== Demographics ==
In the 2021 Census of Population conducted by Statistics Canada, Hazel Dell had a population of 15 living in 12 of its 16 total private dwellings, a change of 0% from its 2016 population of 15. With a land area of 0.42 km^{2} (0.16 sq mi), it had a population density of 35.7/km^{2} (92.5/sq mi) in 2021.
