= Clarkboro Ferry =

Cable ferry across the South Saskatchewan River in Saskatchewan, Canada

Coordinates: 52.320°N 106.457°W

- Locale: Aberdeen No. 373, Corman Park No. 344
- Waterway: South Saskatchewan River
- Transit type: Automobile
- Carries: Highway 784
- Operator: Saskatchewan Ministry of Highways and Infrastructure
- Website: Clarkboro Ferry

The Clarkboro Ferry is a cable ferry in the Canadian province of Saskatchewan. The ferry crosses the South Saskatchewan River at Clark's Crossing, carrying Saskatchewan Highway 784 across the river, and connecting Warman in the west and Aberdeen in the east. The ferry is named for the community of Clarkboro located southeast of the ferry's eastern terminal. The former town of Clarkboro was home to a section crew on the CNR, had a post office, a general store, a railroad siding, a water tower for steam locomotives and two grain elevators (Saskatchewan Pool Elevator Co. No. 760). Both Clarkboro and Clark's Crossing are named for John Fowler Clark, who homesteaded the area in 1882.

The ferry is operated by the Saskatchewan Ministry of Highways and Infrastructure and is free of toll. The ferry operates only while the river is free of ice, typically from mid April to mid November. During this time, the ferry runs on demand from 5:00 A.M. CST to midnight.

The ferry has a length of 18.2 metres (60 ft), a width of 6 metres (20 ft) and a load limit of 32 tonnes (31 long tons; 35 short tons). The capacity of the ferry is six cars.

The ferry typically carries over 70,000 vehicles each year, the most of any ferry in province. In 1999, the Clarkboro Ferry carried 52,185 vehicles.

== See also ==
- List of crossings of the South Saskatchewan River
