= Stony Beach, Saskatchewan =

Community in Saskatchewan, Canada

Coordinates: 50°28′00″N 105°10′02″W

Location of Stony Beach in Saskatchewan

Stony Beach is a hamlet in the Canadian province of Saskatchewan. Access is from Highway 642.

== See also ==
- List of communities in Saskatchewan
