= Saskatchewan Highway 212 =

Provincial highway in Saskatchewan, Canada

Highway 212

Route information
- Maintained by Ministry of Highways and Infrastructure
- Length: 25.9 km (16.1 mi)

Major junctions
- East end: Highway 11 / Highway 783 at Duck Lake
- Highway 683 north of Carlton
- West end: Fort Carlton Provincial Historic Park

Location
- Country: Canada
- Province: Saskatchewan
- Rural municipalities: Duck Lake, Rosthern

Highway system
- Provincial highways in Saskatchewan
← Highway 211	→ Highway 219

Highway 212 is a provincial highway in the Canadian province of Saskatchewan. Saskatchewan's 200-series highways primarily service its recreational areas. The highway runs from Highway 11 / Highway 783 near Duck Lake west to Fort Carlton Provincial Historic Park. It passes through Titanic, connects with Highway 683, and is about 26 kilometres (16 mi) long.

== Route description ==
Highway 212 begins at the main parking lot within Fort Carlton Provincial Historic Park, near the banks of the North Saskatchewan River. It winds its way eastward up and out of the river valley, passing the park's main gate as it leaves Fort Carlton and takes sudden turn to the south along Range Road 3042 as it passes through the One Arrow 95-1G and Tipamahto Aski 95A reserves of the One Arrow First Nation. The highway now turns back eastward onto Township Road 450 at the intersection with Highway 683 just north of Carlton, travelling through Titanic, where it has an intersection with Range Road 3040 (provides access to the Wingard Ferry), before heading southeast through the main reserve of the Beardy's and Okemasis' Cree Nation and past Duck Lake and the Battle of Duck Lake Monument. Now curving back eastward, Highway 212 enters the town of Duck Lake along Anderson Avenue, travelling through the north side of town and becoming concurrent (overlapped) with Highway 783 (Front Street) before crossing a railway and passing by the Duck Lake Regional Interpretive Centre to come to an end at an intersection with Highway 11 (Louis Riel Trail), with the highway continuing east towards the St. Laurent Ferry as Highway 783. The entire length of Highway 212 is a paved, two-lane highway, entirely residing within the Rural Municipality of Duck Lake No. 463 except at the intersection with Highway 683, which straddles the border with the RM of Rosthern No. 403.

== Major intersections ==
From west towards east:

Rural municipality	Location	km	mi	Destinations	Notes
Duck Lake No. 463	Fort Carlton Provincial Historic Park	0.0	0.0	Dead end at main parking lot	Western terminus
Duck Lake No. 463	Fort Carlton Provincial Historic Park	1.1	0.68	Fort Carlton Provincial Historic Park main gate	
Duck Lake No. 463 / Rosthern No. 403 boundary		6.1	3.8	Highway 683 south – Carlton	Northern terminus of Hwy 683
Duck Lake No. 463	Titanic	9.3	5.8	Range Road 3040 – Wingard Ferry	
Duck Lake No. 463	Beardy's & Okemasis' 96 & 97	15.9	9.9	Range Road 3032 – Rosthern	
Duck Lake No. 463	Duck Lake	25.0	15.5	Highway 783 west (Front Street)	Western end of Hwy 783 concurrency
Duck Lake No. 463	Duck Lake	25.9	16.1	Highway 11 (Louis Riel Trail) – Prince Albert, Saskatoon Highway 783 east – St. Laurent de Grandin, St. Laurent Ferry	Eastern terminus of Hwy 212; Hwy 783 continues east
1.000 mi = 1.609 km; 1.000 km = 0.621 mi: Concurrency terminus

== See also ==
- Transportation in Saskatchewan
- Roads in Saskatchewan
