= Prince Albert Rural Water Utility =

Water utility in Saskatchewan, Canada

The Prince Albert Rural Water Utility or PARWU is a rural water utility independent of City of Prince Albert. It was founded in 1993 by Colin Sheldon.

== History ==
In 1993, a steering committee made up of RM of Prince Albert residents was formed. At that time their aim was to ensure a safe and adequate supply of water to their families and operations. PARWU was formed by bylaw through the RMs of Prince Albert, RM of Buckland, and RM of Duck Lake.

By 1995, the 120-kilometres of pipeline was completed for the initial 125 subscribers. That water source was vital for area businesses such as hog, beef, and dairy producers, and an oilseed processing operation.

The PARWU partnered with the City of Prince Albert as Prince Albert would become the main source for the water.

Since the initial pipeline was completed, it has expanded. On November 8, 1996, a signing between the PARWU and Muskoday First Nations took place at the Muskoday Community Hall. The signing was witnessed by chief of Muskoday First Nations Austin Bear, Colin Sheldon who was the chairman of PARWU at the time, then councilor of Prince Albert Lawrence Joseph, Indian Affairs representative Ray Gamercy, plus a number of Muskoday residents. Although Muskoday was notified a year and a half earlier that the pipeline was going in their direction. They were in negotiations until the November 8th signing. The pipeline in Muskoday went towards rectifying the water problem facing the reserve.

== Water advisories ==
On July 21, 2016, a leak was reported on Husky Energy's 16TAN pipeline where it crosses the North Saskatchewan River near Maidstone, Saskatchewan. The spill effect around 70,000 residents in communities including North Battleford and Prince Albert. The spill effected not only the City of Prince Albert, but also PARWU subscribers. The City of Prince Albert shut off their intake valve in which they got their source of water from the North Saskatchewan River. On August 17, 2019; general manager Ken Danger said PARWU subscribers would receive a "break on their bill," but didn't know how it would be done at that time. They still experienced discolouration in their water as crews continued to clean it up.

On October 18, 2016, PARWU issued a boil water advisory on the RM of Buckland for precautionary reasons. The day before (October 17), the City of Prince Albert experienced an issue with one of its pipelines near Central Ave. and River St. E.. The water was shut off PARWU in order to fix the issue before it was later turned back on. On November 6, 2016; the precautionary drinking water drinking water advisory for both RMs of Prince Albert and Duck Lake were lifted. PARWU said the system was flushed and the results of the results of the test samples deemed it had returned to acceptable limits. When the advisory was originally put in place, general manager of PARWU Ken Danger said it effected users of the south line which included RMs of Prince Albert and Duck Lake. The advisory was due to a depressurization of the water lines while they underwent repairs.

== PARWU serves ==
- Davis
- Duck Lake
- Halcro
- McDowall
- Muskoday First Nations
- Red Deer Hill
- RM of Buckland
- RM of Duck Lake
- RM of Garden River
- RM of Prince Albert

== Board members ==
Here are the current board members representing the RMs of Prince Albert, Buckland, and Duck Lake as per the official website.

- RM of Prince Albert
  - Tyler Hazelwood - Chairperson
  - Robin Fremont - Board member
- RM of Buckland
  - Ken Danger - General Manager
  - Larry Eros - Board member
  - Luc Kadziolka - Community member
- RM of Duck Lake
  - Gordon King - Board member
  - Sidney Kernohan - Community member
