= Transportation in Saskatchewan =

Saskatchewan has a transportation infrastructure system of roads, highways, freeways, airports, ferries, pipelines, trails, waterways, and railway systems serving a population of approximately 1,132,505 (according to 2021 census) inhabitants year-round.

It is funded primarily with local, rural municipality, and federal government funds.

80% of traffic is carried on our principal system of highways which is 5,031 km in length (20% of the total network).

— Saskatchewan Department of Highways and Transportation (See also Pareto principle.)

== History ==
Early European settlers and explorers in Canada introduced the wheel to North America's Aboriginal peoples, who relied on canoes, york boat, bateaux, and kayaks, in addition to the snowshoe, toboggan, and sled in winter. Europeans adopted these technologies as Europeans pushed deeper into the continent's interior, and were thus able to travel via the waterways that fed from the St. Lawrence River Great Lakes route and Hudson Bay Churchill River route and then across land to Saskatchewan.

In the 19th century and early 20th century transportation relied on harnessing oxen to Red River carts or horse to wagon. Maritime transportation was via manual labour such as canoe or wind on sail and utilized the North Saskatchewan River or South Saskatchewan River routes mainly. Water or land travel speeds was approximately 8 to 15 kilometres per hour (5 to 9 miles per hour). Settlement was along river routes, and trade was locally concentrated initially on fur trading posts. Agricultural commodities were perishable, and trade centres were within 50 kilometres. Rural areas centred on villages, and they were approximately 10 kilometres (6.2 mi) apart. The advent of steam railways and steamships connected resources and markets of vast distances in the late 19th century.

Automobile and truck travel was employed in the early 20th century with highways and roads being under construction. The roadways ran parallel to the rail lines. The auto was abandoned in the depression years of the dirty thirties, and cars were towed by horse and became known as Bennett Buggies. The years following World War II showed much growth as the social economic lifestyle of Saskatchewan changed considerably. Gone were the farmers on each quarter section, and also leaving the prairie landscape were elevators. Grain storage elevators used to be required every 6 miles for loads by horse and cart. Combines introduced large scale farms, trucks introduced larger centres with a larger quantity of elevators. In the 1940s the branch rail lines were not economically feasible, were abandoned, and soon disappeared. As farms increased in size township roads and road allowances became part of the field.

== Trails ==
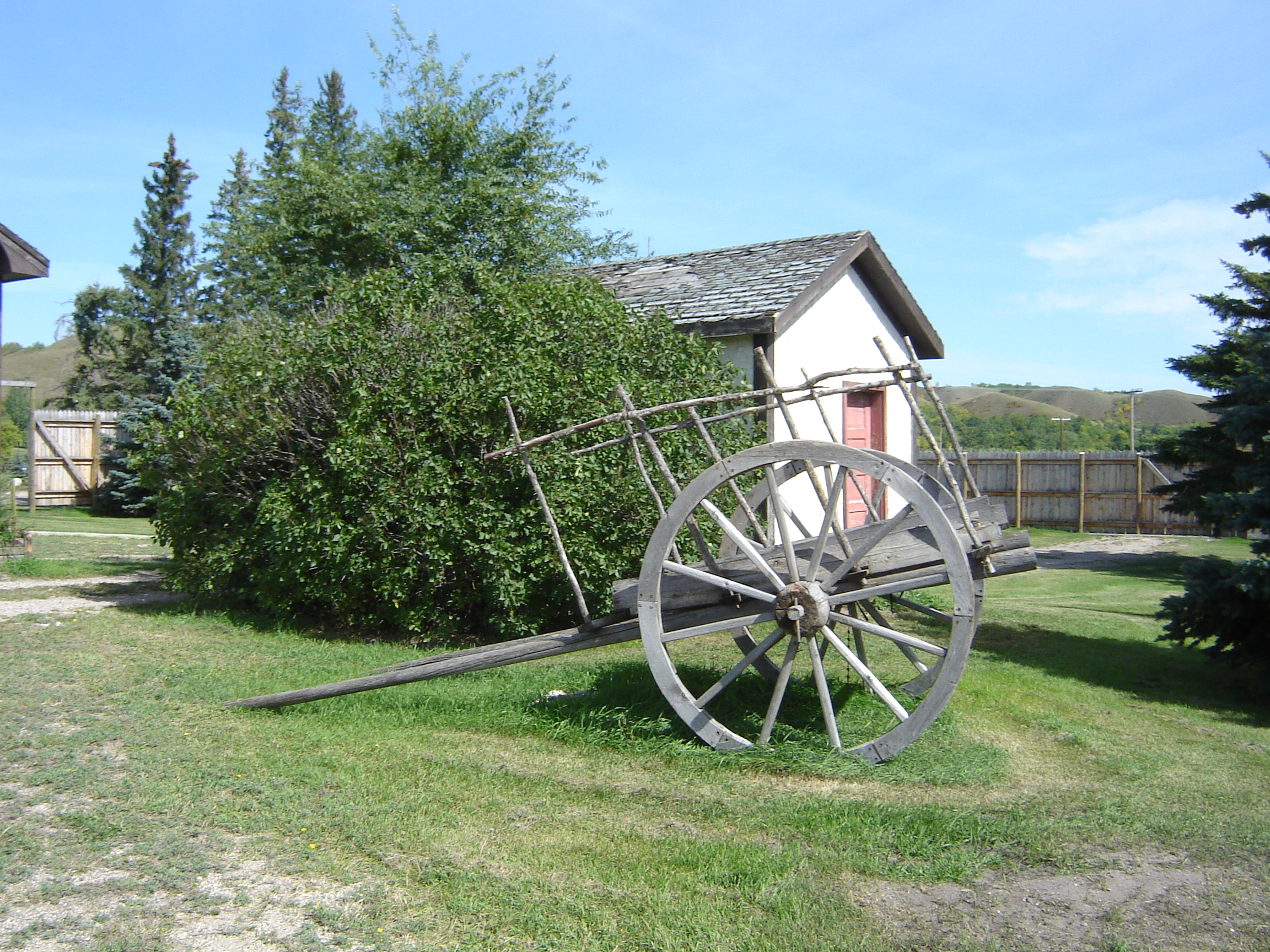
Red River cart

Historically buffalo and Red River cart trails criss-crossed the prairies. Métis fur traders and brigades would follow these trails freighting supplies for the Hudson's Bay Company. Originally following trails created by bison, trails connected together trading posts, North-West Mounted Police forts and barracks. The Dominion government Boundary Commission Trail, the North-West Mounted Police Red Coat Trail, American–Canadian boundary trails, telegraph trail, railway trail, and rebellion trails were later trails. Due to the hard compaction of prairie sod, the remnants of this trail are still visible via satellite imaging to the trained historian eye.

From Winnipeg through to Fort Edmonton was the famed Carlton Trail, also known as the Saskatchewan or Edmonton trail. The trail went from Fort Ellice east of the present Manitoba–Saskatchewan border northwest to Fort Carlton, followed the North Saskatchewan River, then onwards to Jackfish Lake and thence across the present Alberta–Saskatchewan border.

Fort Qu'Appelle, Prince Albert, and the territorial capital, Battleford, were the main centres in the 19th century. From these extended a variety of trails as spokes extend from the hub on a wheel. This includes the 190-mile-long (310 km) Swift Current–Battleford Trail, an important late-nineteenth century transportation and communications link between settlements of Swift Current and Battleford.

The Boundary Commission Trail was a 30-foot-wide (9.1 m) trail cut through timber and brush by a surveying team marking the 49th parallel, beginning between 1872 and 1874. In 1874, the North-West Mounted Police were dispatched to Fort Whoop-Up in what is now Alberta. They travelled through the United States to the Manitoba border, and from there were to follow the boundary survey trail to Fort Whoop-Up. There actual route extended through Roche Percee, the Cypress Hills, Ponteix, and near Medicine Hat. 1875 marked the beginnings of the Telegraph Trail which was a 132-foot-wide (40 m) trail from Fort Pelly, to Fort Carlton, Humboldt, Prince Albert, Battleford, and onwards to Edmonton. This was to be the initial stage for the transcontinental railway to travel through the more populated areas of the fur trade area and the North-West Territories' capital, Battleford. The southern area of the North-West territories was deemed in Palliser's report to be a vast desert and unfit for human habitation.

== Rail ==
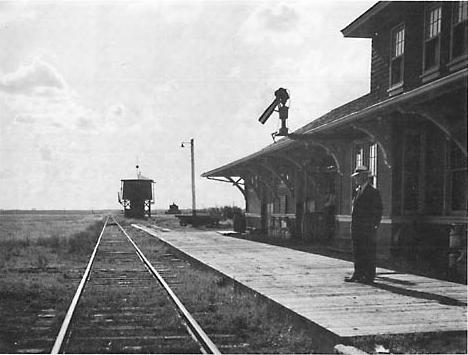
Eatonia Railway Station

The first Canadian transcontinental railway was constructed by the Canadian Pacific Railway between 1881 and 1885. The first proposal was northerly through the Saskatchewan provisional district of the North-West Territories to support the fur trade. The final established route was through the Assiniboia provisional district of the North-West Territories. Towns such as Moosomin, Qu'Appelle, Regina, Moose Jaw, and Swift Current sprang up along the railway and became trade centres. The new economy saw grain and agricultural farming as a viable alternative, and Clifford Sifton implemented a massive immigration policy in support of settling the West. The rail lines followed the established trails generally as the most practical method of travelling through the prairies. After the great east–west transcontinental railway was built, north–south connector branch lines were established. In 1885, the Regina and Long Lake Railway connected Regina and Craven. The railway was eventually expanded north to Prince Albert. The Regina and Long Lake railroad or the Qu'Appelle, Long Lake and Saskatchewan Railroad and Steamboat Company crossed the South Saskatchewan River at Saskatoon, Hub city in 1890. In 1907 the communities of Melville, The Rail Centre, Watrous, and Biggar became divisional points for the Grand Trunk Pacific Railway. Moose Jaw, dubbed Little Chicago, was the northern terminus on the Soo Line, which ran to Chicago, and provided a route during the prohibition years for alcohol freighting between Canada and the United States. The 1920s saw the largest rise in trackage as the CPR and CNR fell into competition to provide rail service within ten kilometres. In the 1960s there were applications for abandonment of branch lines.

Today the only two passenger rail services in the province are The Canadian and the Winnipeg – Churchill train, both operated by Via Rail. The Canadian is a transcontinental service linking Toronto with Vancouver. Within Saskatchewan The Canadian calls at Melville, Watrous, Saskatoon, Biggar, and Unity stations. The Winnipeg - Churchill train calls at Togo, Kamsack, Veregin, Mikado, Canora, Sturgis, Endeavour, Reserve, and Hudson Bay.

There are nearly 1,734 km of short-line freight railways in the province. These railways are regulated by the provincial government, and include:

- Southern Rails Cooperative (72 km)
- Carlton Trail Railway (481 km)
- Red Coat Road and Rail (115 km)
- Great Western Railway (496 km)
- Thunder Rail (31 km)
- Wheatland Rail (74 km)
- Fife Lake Railway (94 km)
- Torch River Rail (45 km)
- Great Sandhills Railway (187 km)
- Last Mountain Railway (136 km)

== Highways ==
The Dominion Land Survey system for homesteading provided for townships which were six miles square (36 sq mi or 93 km^{2}). An iron post was driven into the ground at the north-east corner of every 1-mile (1.6 km) square. Road allowances were to the north and east of the iron monuments.

Road Allowance
31	32	33	34	35	36
30	29	28	27	26	25
Road Allowance
19	20	21	22	23	24
18	17	16	15	14	13
Road Allowance
7	8	9	10	11	12
6	5	4	3	2	1
Road Allowance

By 1921, there were 210,000 miles (340,000 km) of road allowance in the province which began as dirt roads. A system began of improved and unimproved dirt, gravel, oil-gravel surfaced roads, and all weather paved roads and highways. Currently Saskatchewan Highways and Transportation operates over 26,000 kilometres (16,000 mi) of highways and divided highways, over 800 bridges, 12 separate ferries, and one barge. There are also municipal roads which comprise different surfaces. Asphalt concrete pavements comprise almost 9,000 kilometres (5,600 mi), granular pavement almost 5,000 kilometres (3,100 mi), non structural or thin membrane surface TMS are close to 7,000 kilometres (4,300 mi) and finally gravel highways make up over 5,600 kilometres (3,500 mi) through the province. TMS roads are maintained by the provincial government department: Saskatchewan Highways and Transportation. In the northern sector, ice roads which can only be navigated in the winter months comprise another approximately 150 kilometres (93 mi) of travel. Dirt roads also still exist in rural areas and would be maintained by the local resident. All in all, Saskatchewan consists of over 250,000 kilometres (160,000 mi) of roads and highways, the highest amount of road surface compared to any other Canadian province. Roads need to be constructed for the hot summer months, as well as the frigid winter months. Saskatchewan Highways and Transportation seeks to provide an operational transportation system that ensures the safe travel of people and products within a vast province. Crack filling, snow and ice removal, pavement marking, signage, lighting, and infrastructure planning. The rural municipalities care for rural roads of which 97 per cent are gravel and the rest asphalt surface. Road transport provides short and long haul movement for both commercial freight and passenger traffic. Short haul traffic moving small volumes is an economically feasible method low cost method of freight hauling.

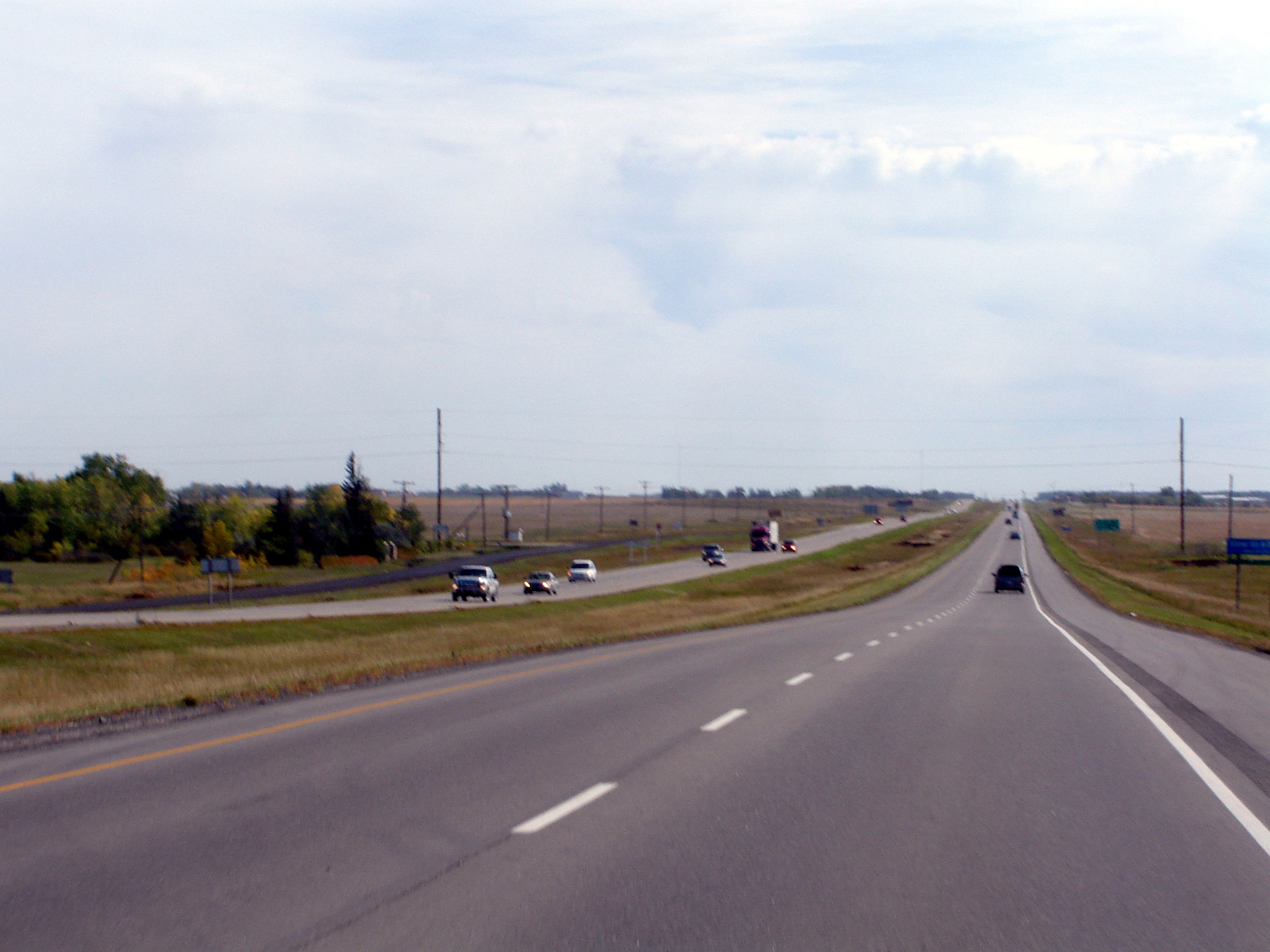
Trans Canada 1

The principal highways in Saskatchewan are the Trans Canada expressway, Yellowhead Highway northern Trans Canada route, Louis Riel Trail, CanAm Highway, Red Coat Trail, Northern Woods and Water route, and Saskota travel route.

The Government of Canada has agreed to contribute $20 million for two new interchanges in Saskatoon. One of them being at the Sk Hwy 219 / Lorne Ave intersection with Circle Drive, the other at the Senator Sid Buckwold Bridge (Idylwyld Freeway) and Circle Drive. This is part of the Asia-Pacific Gateway and Corridor Initiative to improve access to the Canadian National Railway's intermodal freight terminal thereby increasing Asia-Pacific trade. Also, the Government of Canada will contribute $27 million to Regina to construct a Canadian Pacific Railway CPR intermodal facility and improve infrastructure transportation to the facility from both national highway networks, Sk Hwy 1, the TransCanada Highway and Sk Hwy 11, Louis Riel Trail. This also is part of the Asia-Pacific Gateway and Corridor Initiative to improve access to the CPR terminal and increase Asia-Pacific trade.

As of 1946, the Saskatchewan Transportation Company (STC) was formed to provide inter city transportation services via highway bus service. The provincial government closed STC on 31 May 2017.

== Urban transport ==
Urban, suburban, and interurban transport has included streetcars, electric railways, electric trolleys (trolley buses), motor buses, and motor coaches. The Saskatoon Electric Railway and Power Company, Moose Jaw Electric Railway Company and the Regina Municipal Railway , were electric railways, and were first operational in 1911. Regina stopped using the electric trolley buses in 1966. Saskatoon's streetcar system closed in 1951, and its trolley bus system in 1974. The Saskatoon Transit System was renamed Saskatoon Transit Services in 1995.

== Waterways ==
The main Saskatchewan waterways are the North Saskatchewan River or South Saskatchewan River routes. Early ferry service and steamship travel were employed on the major waterways. Barges for freight transfer have used the Athabasca River servicing Uranium City, Fond du Lac, Stony Rapids, and Black Lake. Wollaston Lake barge services Wollaston lake.

As early as 1874 the SS Northcote travelled between Grand Rapids, Manitoba and went as far west as Edmonton, Alberta, through Carlton House on the North Saskatchewan River. The City of Medicine Hat traversed the South Saskatchewan River waters near Saskatoon. Carrot River used steamships to aid in the logging industry. Last Mountain Lake used steamships and was a main impetus for the formation of the Qu'Appelle Long Lake and Saskatchewan Railway and Steamship Company (QLLR). The North West Navigation Co. had four steamships to aid in the fur trade industry, Princess, Marquette, Colville, and Glendevon. Winnipeg and Western Company's had three steamers, the Northcote, the Marquis and North West.

=== Ferry services ===
There are currently twelve ferry services operating in the province, all under the jurisdiction of the Department of Highways. In the 1920s through to the 1950s there were 36 ferries in operation, the highest number of ferries in the province. In the 1860s the Hudson's Bay Company built a river ferry near Fort Carlton on the North Saskatchewan River. 1871 saw the ferry crossing at Gabriel's Crossing near present-day St. Laurent Ferry. In 1883 a ferry on the Battleford Trail was able to provide crossing service for two red river carts across the South Saskatchewan River at Saskatchewan Landing. This ferry operated until 1953 when the second bridge was officially opened.

Ferries of Saskatchewan
Ferry	Location	Waterway	Reference
Estuary	connecting Estuary and Laporte	South Saskatchewan River	
Lemsford	North of Lemsford connecting 32 and 30	South Saskatchewan River	
Lancer	North of Lancer connecting 32 and 30	South Saskatchewan River	
Riverhurst	Highway 42 and Highway 373	Lake Diefenbaker	
Clarkboro	Between Warman and Aberdeen on 784	South Saskatchewan River	
Hague	Between Hague and Aberdeen	South Saskatchewan River	
St. Laurent	East of Duck Lake, 11 and Batoche 225	South Saskatchewan River	
Fenton	Between 25 and 3 on Grid Road	South Saskatchewan River	
Weldon	Between 3, Weldon via 682 and 302, Prince Albert	South Saskatchewan River	
Paynton	Between 16 and 26 via 764	North Saskatchewan River	
Wingard	East of Marcelin, 40 connecting to 11 Wingard	North Saskatchewan River	
Cecil	Between 302 and 55 east of Prince Albert	North Saskatchewan River	

=== Bridges ===
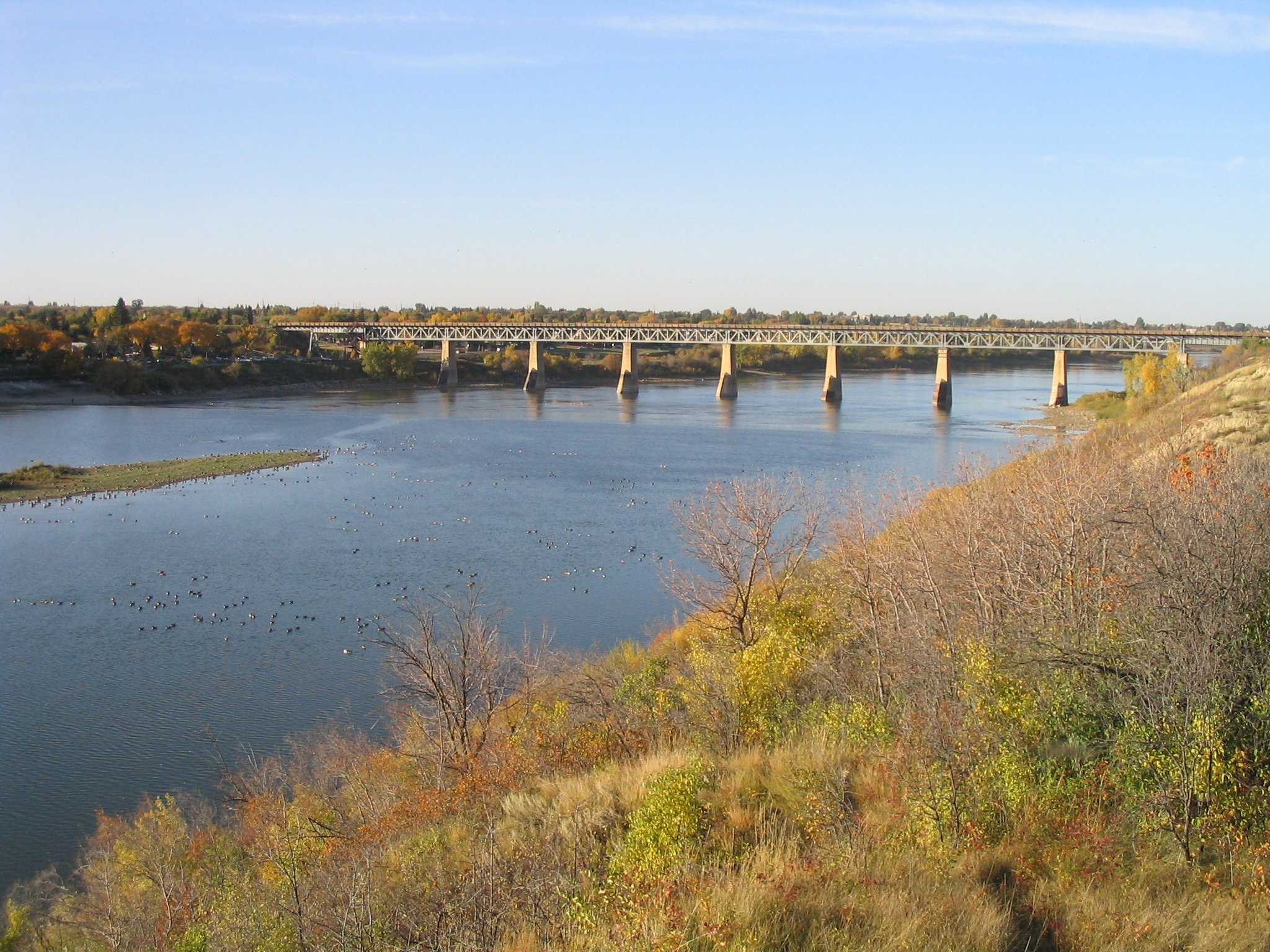
Bridge over the South Saskatchewan River

Early corduroy log road bridges, and rail bridges were the precursors to vehicular traffic bridges. The Qu’Appelle, Long Lake and Saskatchewan Railway Company built a railway bridge in 1890 at Saskatoon crossing the South Saskatchewan River. Saskatoon is termed "The City of Bridges". By 1908, another two railway bridges were constructed in Saskatoon, the McDonald or CP Railway Bridge and the Grand Trunk or CN Railway Bridge. The Traffic Bridge, a truss bridge opened October 10, 1907, as the first vehicle bridge in Saskatoon.

North Battleford, Swift Current and Nipawin constructed railway bridges.

The Ceepee bridge (later renamed the Borden Bridge) was built 1936 across the North Saskatchewan River between Saskatoon and the Battlefords. This bridge has been abandoned, and replaced.

In south-west Saskatchewan, near Gull Lake, North Battleford, Scotsguard and Outlook are abandoned highway traffic bridges.

In total, there are 3,050 bridges maintained by the Department of Highways in Saskatchewan.

== Airports ==
Saskatoon featured its inaugural Air Harbour in 1913 near the exhibition grounds. The Hudson Bay Slough site established in 1922 became the site for the present airport. The Department of National Defence, Civil Aviation Branch requested the City of Saskatoon to establish an airport. Saskatoon Airport was part of the Department of National Defence during the years of World War II and an RCAF training school was established. Trans-Canada Air Lines began 1947. The Saskatoon Airport (YXE) was named the John G. Diefenbaker Airport in the official ceremony, June 23, 1993. Roland J. Groome Airfield is the official designation for the Regina International Airport (YQR) as of August 3, 2005. The Regina Flying Club sought to establish an airport as of 1927, and in 1930 the Regina Municipal Airport was constructed.

Under the British Commonwealth Air Training Plan (BCATP), twenty Service Flying Training Schools (RAF) were established at various Saskatchewan locations in World War II. Moose Jaw RCAF is home to the aeronautics team, the Snowbirds.

Airlines offering service to Saskatchewan are Air Canada, WestJet Airlines, Transwest Air, Norcanair Airlines, La Ronge Aviation Services Ltd, La Loche Airways, Osprey Wings Ltd, Buffalo Narrows Airways Ltd, Skyservice Airlines, Île-à-la-Crosse Airways Ltd, Voyage Air, Pronto Airways, Venture Air Ltd, Pelican Narrows Air Service, Jackson Air Services Ltd, and Northern Dene Airways Ltd.

== Pipelines ==
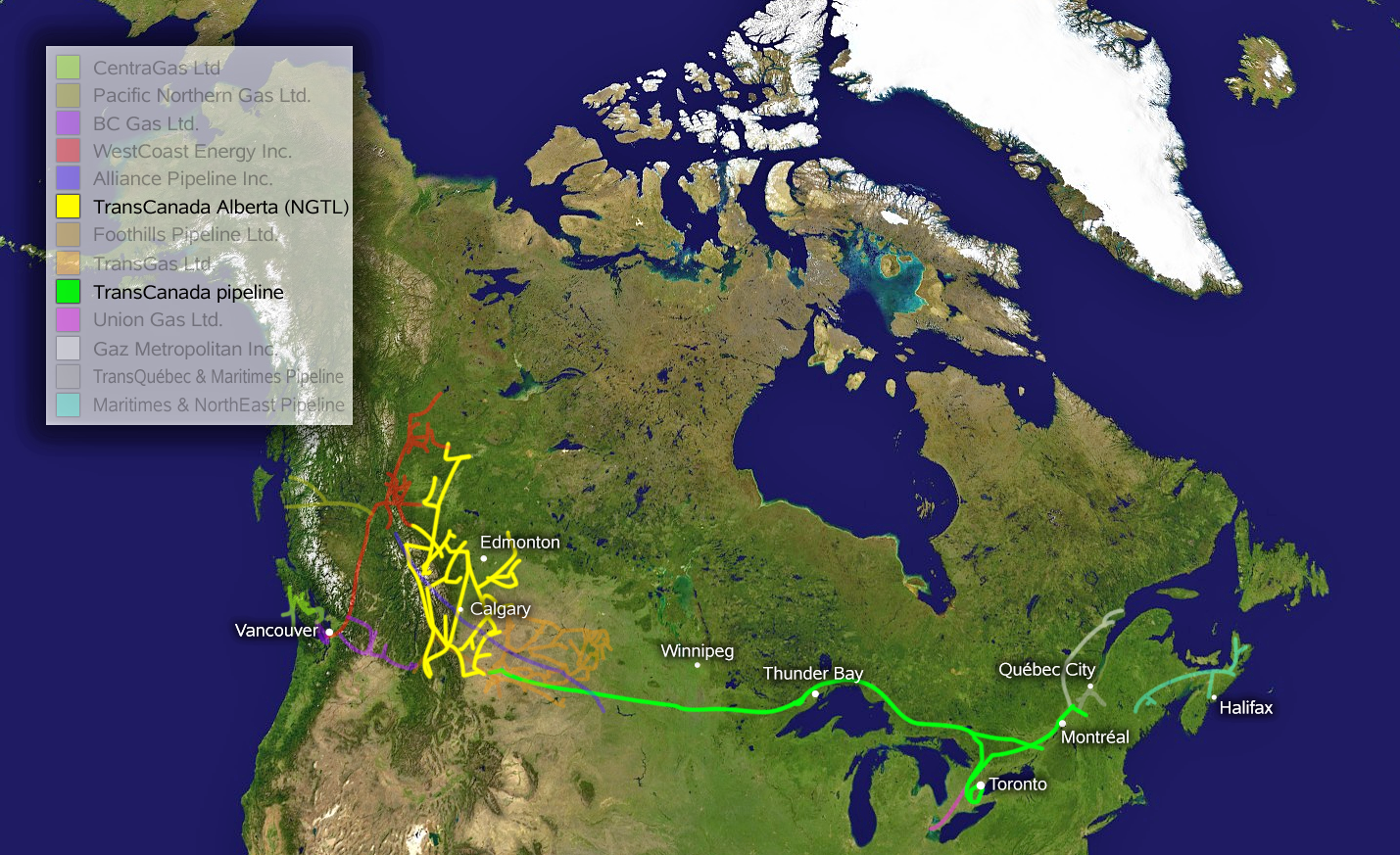
The TransCanada pipeline route

Pipelines are part of the energy production and transportation network of Canada and, in this regard, may carry natural gas, natural gas liquids, crude oil, synthetic crude, or other petroleum based products. The 1930s saw the first pipe line system in Lloydminster.

== Hiking trails in Saskatchewan ==
The Trans Canada Trail is a trail traversing every province across Canada. Across Saskatchewan are a variety of trails, hiking, cross country ski trails, and snowmobile or skidoo trails. Hiking or backpacking trails abound across Saskatchewan, the most notable is the hike into Grey Owl's Cabin within the Prince Albert National Park. Skytrail, Canada's longest pedestrian bridge, is in the Outlook & District Regional Park. The Saskatchewan Trails Association brings together information for trail enthusiasts of all forms hikers, cyclists, horseback riders, skiers, ski-dooers, or canoeists. The Three Rivers Trail Association (TRTA) is developing interpretative trails between the Arm River, the Qu'Appelle River, and the South Saskatchewan Rivers. The Meewasin Valley Authority has constructed and maintained a series of walking trails along the South Saskatchewan River banks in Saskatoon.

== See also ==
- Ministry of Highways and Infrastructure
- Numbered highways in Canada
- Plug-in electric vehicles in Saskatchewan
