= Halcro (disambiguation) =

Halcro is a district in Saskatchewan, Canada. Halcro may also refer to:

- Halcro, Orkney, Scotland
- Halcro and Pakashan, an Indian reserve in Alberta, Canada
- Andrew Halcro (born 1964), American politician
- Jamie Halcro Johnston, British politician

== See also ==
- Halcrow (disambiguation)
