= Willow Cree Reserve =

Indian reserve in Saskatchewan, Canada

Coordinates: 52°47′50″N 106°14′25″W

- Indian reserve
- Willow Cree Indian Reserve
- Location in Saskatchewan
- First Nations: Beardy's and Okemasis'; One Arrow
- Country: Canada
- Province: Saskatchewan

Area
  - Total: 277.2 ha (685 acres)

The Willow Cree Reserve is an Indian reserve shared by Beardy's and Okemasis' Cree Nation and the One Arrow First Nation in Saskatchewan. It is about 50 kilometres (31 mi) south-west of Prince Albert, and adjacent to the town of Duck Lake on the eastern shore of Duck Lake.

== See also ==
- List of Indian reserves in Saskatchewan
