= Rural Municipality of Prince Albert No. 461 =

Rural municipality in Saskatchewan, Canada

Prince Albert No. 461
- Rural municipality
- Rural Municipality of Prince Albert No. 461

- Location of the RM of Prince Albert No. 461
- Coordinates: 53°08′37″N 105°35′40″W
- Country: Canada
- Province: Saskatchewan
- Census division: 15
- SARM division: 5
- Formed: December 9, 1912

Government
  - Reeve: TBD
  - Governing body: RM of Prince Albert No. 461 Council
  - Administrator: Roxanne Roy
  - Office location: Prince Albert

Area (2016)
  - Land: 1,017.44 km^{2} (392.84 sq mi)

Population (2016)
  - Total: 3,562
  - Density: 3.5/km^{2} (9.1/sq mi)
- Time zone: CST
  - Summer (DST): CST
- Area codes: 306 and 639
- Website: Official website

The Rural Municipality of Prince Albert No. 461 (2016 population: 3,562) is a rural municipality (RM) in the Canadian province of Saskatchewan within Census Division No. 15 and SARM Division No. 5. The RM lies between the North Saskatchewan River and the South Saskatchewan River, and is located south of Prince Albert.

== History ==
The RM of Prince Albert No. 461 incorporated as a rural municipality on December 9, 1912.

== Geography ==
=== Communities and localities ===
The following urban municipalities are surrounded by the RM.

Cities

- Prince Albert

The following unincorporated communities are within the RM.

Localities

- Birson
- Cecil
- Clouston
- Cudworth Junction
- Davis
- Fir Ridge
- Halcro
- Holmes
- Red Deer Hill
- Stanleyville

== Demographics ==
Population history (1981–2016)
Year	Pop.	±%
1981	3,282	—
1986	3,500	+6.6%
1991	3,340	−4.6%
1996	3,322	−0.5%
2001	3,380	+1.7%
2006	2,918	−13.7%
2011	3,580	+22.7%
2016	3,562	−0.5%
Source: Statistics Canada via Saskatchewan Bureau of Statistics

In the 2021 Census of Population conducted by Statistics Canada, the RM of Prince Albert No. 461 had a population of 3,438 living in 1,055 of its 1,111 total private dwellings, a change of −3.5% from its 2016 population of 3,562. With a land area of 1,010.1 km^{2} (390.0 sq mi), it had a population density of 3.4/km^{2} (8.8/sq mi) in 2021.

In the 2016 Census of Population, the RM of Prince Albert No. 461 recorded a population of 3,562 living in 1,054 of its 1,122 total private dwellings, a −1.1% change from its 2011 population of 3,601. With a land area of 1,017.44 km^{2} (392.84 sq mi), it had a population density of 3.5/km^{2} (9.1/sq mi) in 2016.

== Attractions ==
- Diefenbaker House
- St. Louis Ghost Train
- South Branch House
- Cecil Ferry
- Fenton Ferry
- Weldon Ferry
- Saskatchewan River Forks Recreation Site

== Government ==
The RM of Prince Albert No. 461 is governed by an elected municipal council and an appointed administrator that meets on the second Thursday of every month. The reeve of the RM is Eric Schmalz while its CAO is Rochelle Neff. The RM's office is located in Prince Albert.

== Transportation ==
- Saskatchewan Highway 20
- Saskatchewan Highway 773
- Saskatchewan Highway 777
- St. Louis Bridge
- Cecil Ferry
- Fenton Ferry
- Weldon Ferry
- Prince Albert Airport
- CTRW Railway

== See also ==
- List of rural municipalities in Saskatchewan
