= Saskatchewan Highway 302 =

Provincial highway in Saskatchewan, Canada

Highway 302

Route information
- Maintained by Ministry of Highways and Infrastructure
- Length: 72.2 km (44.9 mi)

Major junctions
- West end: Near Nisbet Provincial Forest
- Highway 2 in Prince Albert; CanAm Highway / Highway 3 in Prince Albert
- East end: Weldon Ferry

Location
- Country: Canada
- Province: Saskatchewan
- Rural municipalities: Duck Lake, Prince Albert
- Major cities: Prince Albert

Highway system
- Provincial highways in Saskatchewan
← Highway 301	→ Highway 303

Highway 302 is a provincial highway in the Canadian province of Saskatchewan. It runs from the northern terminal of the Weldon Ferry, which connects to Highway 682 across the South Saskatchewan River, to a dead end near the Nisbet Provincial Forest. It is about 72 kilometres (45 mi) long.

Highway 302 goes westward from the South Saskatchewan River, passing near the communities of Birson, Fir Ridge, and Cecil. It then enters the city of Prince Albert as 15th Street. Within Prince Albert, Highway 302 connects with Highway 2 and Highway 3. West of Prince Albert, it passes through the Prince Albert Settlement and near the community of Lily Plain before ending.

Highway 302 provides access to La Colle Falls and Saskatchewan River Forks Recreation Site.

== History ==
Saskatchewan Highways and Transportation (SHT), now the Ministry of Highways and Infrastructure, undertook a landslide risk management system program to monitor risk sites, applying technological innovations to prevent any further erosion of the riverbank and plan responses to future landslide movement detected by monitors. Highway 302 near Prince Albert along the North Saskatchewan River near the Saskatchewan Penitentiary has experienced retrogressive landslides.

== Major intersections ==
From west to east:

Rural municipality	Location	km	mi	Destinations	Notes
Duck Lake No. 463		0.0	0.0	road	Hwy 302 western terminus
Prince Albert No. 461	No major junctions				
City of Prince Albert		30.4	18.9	2nd Avenue W (Highway 2) / Highway 3 west – La Ronge, Spiritwood, Moose Jaw, Saskatoon	West end of Hwy 3 concurrency
City of Prince Albert		31.9	19.8	6th Avenue E (Highway 3 east) – Melfort	East end of Hwy 3 concurrency
Prince Albert No. 461		72.2	44.9	Weldon Ferry across the South Saskatchewan River	
Prince Albert No. 461		72.2	44.9	To Highway 682 south – Weldon	Connection via ferry; Hwy 302 eastern terminus
1.000 mi = 1.609 km; 1.000 km = 0.621 mi: Concurrency terminus

== See also ==
- Transportation in Saskatchewan
- Roads in Saskatchewan
