= Duck Lake (Saskatchewan) =

Lake in Saskatchewan, Canada

- Location in Saskatchewan Duck Lake (Canada)
- Location: RM of Duck Lake No. 463, Saskatchewan
- Coordinates: 52.80004°N 106.2672°W
- Part of: South Saskatchewan River drainage basin
- Primary inflows: Kohleschmidt Creek
- Basin countries: Canada
- Surface area: 1,577.1 ha (3,897 acres)
- Shore length^{1}: 69 km (43 mi)
- Settlements: Duck Lake
- ^{1} Shore length is not a well-defined measure.

Duck Lake is a lake in the Canadian province of Saskatchewan. Much of the western shore is within the Beardy's 97 and Okemasis 96 Indian reserve while most of the remainder of the lake is within the Rural Municipality of Duck Lake No. 463. The town of Duck Lake, which was named after the lake, is at the north-eastern corner. Just south of the town, on the eastern shore, is the Willow Cree Reserve. Highway 11 runs along the eastern shore while Highway 212 runs along the northern one.

Just north of the lake, and west of the town, is the site of the Battle of Duck Lake from the 1885 North-West Rebellion.

== History ==
Prior to European settlement, the Indigenous peoples of the region called the lake "See Seep SaKayegan". The current name — Duck Lake — comes from the large number of migratory birds that use it. In the 19th century, the town and, by extension, the lake were at an important junction along two historic trails — the Carlton Trail and the Prince Albert Trail. It was along the Carlton Trail just north of the lake that the Battle of Duck Lake took place on 26 March 1885. It was the first battle of the North-West Rebellion. A commemorative monument was erected in 1950 near the eastern end of what was then the battlefield. The monument rests on a 12-hectare (30-acre) parcel of land on Highway 212, just north of the lake.

About a half-mile south of the town of Duck Lake, on the lake's eastern shore, sat the St. Michael's Indian Residential School. It operated from 1894 to 1996. When it closed, it was one of the last Indian residential schools in Saskatchewan.

== See also ==
- List of lakes of Saskatchewan
