= Fenton, Saskatchewan =

Settlement in Saskatchewan, Canada

Coordinates: 53.01637°N 105.59312°W

Location of Fenton in Saskatchewan

Fenton, formerly Adams Crossing, is an unincorporated community south-east of Prince Albert, Saskatchewan, Canada. It is 13 kilometres (8.1 mi) west from Birch Hills. Fenton is on the banks of the South Saskatchewan River, east of Halcro and south-west of the Muskoday First Nation. The Fenton Ferry is operational seasonally and hosts mainly local traffic. Fenton has a long history dating back to Anglo-Metis settlement before the North-West Rebellion. It is situated in the Aspen parkland biome.

== See also ==
- List of communities in Saskatchewan
