= Rural Municipality of Kinistino No. 459 =

Rural municipality in Saskatchewan, Canada

Kinistino No. 459
- Rural municipality
- Rural Municipality of Kinistino No. 459
- Location of the RM of Kinistino No. 459 in Saskatchewan
- Coordinates: 53.099°N 104.917°W
- Country: Canada
- Province: Saskatchewan
- Census division: 15
- SARM division: 5
- Formed: December 11, 1911

Government
  - Reeve: Vance Shmyr
  - Governing body: RM of Kinistino No. 459 Council
  - Administrator: Jacquelynne Mann
  - Office location: Kinistino

Area (2016)
  - Land: 948.46 km^{2} (366.20 sq mi)

Population (2016)
  - Total: 554
  - Density: 0.6/km^{2} (1.6/sq mi)
- Time zone: CST
  - Summer (DST): CST
- Area codes: 306 and 639

The Rural Municipality of Kinistino No. 459 (2016 population: 554) is a rural municipality (RM) in the Canadian province of Saskatchewan within Census Division No. 15 and SARM Division No. 5.

== History ==
The RM of Kinistino No. 459 incorporated as a rural municipality on December 11, 1911.

== Geography ==
=== Communities and localities ===
The following urban municipalities are surrounded by the RM.

Towns

- Kinistino

Villages

- Weldon

Localities

- Brockington
- Fort a la Corne
- North Star
- Pahonan
- Pine Bluff

A reserves of the James Smith First Nation is also surrounded by the RM.

== Demographics ==
Population history (1981–2016)
Year	Pop.	±%
1981	1,184	—
1986	1,086	−8.3%
1991	954	−12.2%
1996	866	−9.2%
2001	817	−5.7%
2006	713	−12.7%
2011	531	−25.5%
2016	554	+4.3%
Source: Statistics Canada via Saskatchewan Bureau of Statistics

In the 2021 Census of Population conducted by Statistics Canada, the RM of Kinistino No. 459 had a population of 604 living in 220 of its 255 total private dwellings, a change of 9% from its 2016 population of 554. With a land area of 921.69 km^{2} (355.87 sq mi), it had a population density of 0.7/km^{2} (1.7/sq mi) in 2021.

In the 2016 Census of Population, the RM of Kinistino No. 459 recorded a population of 554 living in 205 of its 231 total private dwellings, a −9.6% change from its 2011 population of 613. With a land area of 948.46 km^{2} (366.20 sq mi), it had a population density of 0.6/km^{2} (1.5/sq mi) in 2016.

== Attractions ==
- Kinistino District Pioneer Museum
- Fort à la Corne Provincial Forest
- Fort de la Corne

== Government ==
The RM of Kinistino No. 459 is governed by an elected municipal council and an appointed administrator that meets on the second Thursday of every month. The reeve of the RM is Vance Shmyr while its administrator is Jacquelynne Mann. The RM's office is located in Kinistino.

== Transportation ==
- Saskatchewan Highway 3
- Saskatchewan Highway 682
- Saskatchewan Highway 778
- Saskatchewan Highway 789
- Canadian National Railway
- Weldon Ferry

== See also ==
- List of rural municipalities in Saskatchewan
