= All Saints Anglican Church (Duck Lake, Saskatchewan) =

Church building in Saskatchewan, Canada

General information
- Architectural style: Carpenter Gothic
- Location: Duck Lake, Saskatchewan, Canada
- Coordinates: 52.8135°N 106.235°W
- Construction started: 1896
- Completed: 1896

Technical details
- Structural system: wood frame

All Saints Anglican Church is an historic Carpenter Gothic style Anglican church building located on 7th Street, East, in Duck Lake, Saskatchewan, Canada. Built in 1896 of wood, its steep pitched roof, lancet windows and side entrance tower are typical of Gothic Revival churches. The church's historic burying ground contains the graves of many area pioneers.

The church is a municipal heritage site as designated by the town of Duck Lake on December 14, 1982.
