= Rural Municipality of Duck Lake No. 463 =

Rural municipality in Saskatchewan, Canada

Duck Lake No. 463
- Rural municipality
- Rural Municipality of Duck Lake No. 463
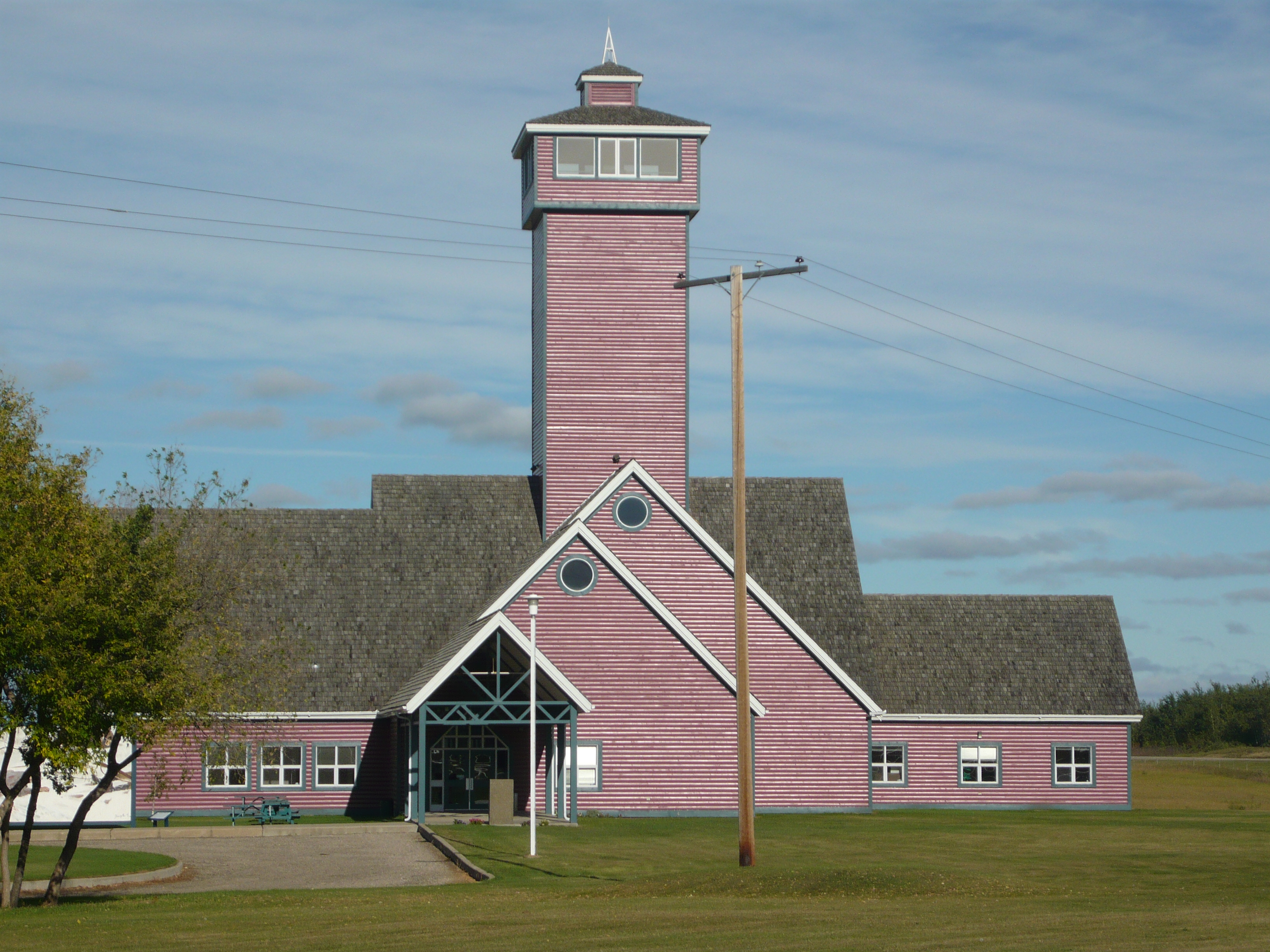
- Duck Lake Regional Interpretive Centre in Duck Lake

- Location of the RM of Duck Lake No. 463 in Saskatchewan
- Coordinates: 52.911°N 106.270°W
- Country: Canada
- Province: Saskatchewan
- Census division: 15
- SARM division: 5
- Formed: January 1, 1913

Government
  - Reeve: Remi Martin
  - Governing body: RM of Duck Lake No. 463 Council
  - Administrator: Karen Baynton
  - Office location: Duck Lake

Area (2016)
  - Land: 1,046.93 km^{2} (404.22 sq mi)

Population (2016)
  - Total: 1,004
  - Density: 1/km^{2} (2.6/sq mi)
- Time zone: CST
  - Summer (DST): CST
- Area codes: 306 and 639

The Rural Municipality of Duck Lake No. 463 (2016 population: 1,004) is a rural municipality (RM) in the Canadian province of Saskatchewan within Census Division No. 15 and SARM Division No. 5.

== History ==
The RM of Duck Lake No. 463 incorporated as a rural municipality on January 1, 1913.

== Geography ==
=== Communities and localities ===
The following urban municipalities are surrounded by the RM.

Towns

- Duck Lake

The following unincorporated communities are within the RM.

Organized hamlets

- MacDowall

Localities

- Lily Plain
- Titanic
- Wingard

== Demographics ==
Population history (1981–2016)
Year	Pop.	±%
1981	1,063	—
1986	945	−11.1%
1991	982	+3.9%
1996	953	−3.0%
2001	945	−0.8%
2006	776	−17.9%
2011	867	+11.7%
2016	1,004	+15.8%
Source: Statistics Canada via Saskatchewan Bureau of Statistics

In the 2021 Census of Population conducted by Statistics Canada, the RM of Duck Lake No. 463 had a population of 1,010 living in 384 of its 450 total private dwellings, a change of 5.8% from its 2016 population of 955. With a land area of 1,034.52 km^{2} (399.43 sq mi), it had a population density of 1.0/km^{2} (2.5/sq mi) in 2021.

In the 2016 Census of Population, the RM of Duck Lake No. 463 recorded a population of 1,004 living in 372 of its 395 total private dwellings, a 18.7% change from its 2011 population of 846. With a land area of 1,046.93 km^{2} (404.22 sq mi), it had a population density of 1.0/km^{2} (2.5/sq mi) in 2016.

== Attractions ==
The following attractions are located within this RM and surrounding area.

- Battle of Duck Lake
- Nisbet Trails
- St. Louis Ghost Train
- South Branch House Provincial Historic Site
- Duck Lake Regional Interpretive Centre
- Our Lady of Lourdes Shrine
- Batoche National Historic Site
- Valley Regional Park
- Mennonite Heritage Village
- Seager Wheeler Farm Historic Site
- Nisbet Provincial Forest
- Frog Lake Massacre
- St. Laurent Ferry
- Wingard Ferry

== Government ==
The RM of Duck Lake No. 463 is governed by an elected municipal council and an appointed administrator that meets on the second Wednesday of every month. The reeve of the RM is Remi Martin while its administrator is Karen Baynton. The RM's office is located in Duck Lake.

== Transportation ==
- Saskatchewan Highway 11
- Saskatchewan Highway 212
- Saskatchewan Highway 302
- Saskatchewan Highway 782
- Saskatchewan Highway 783
- CTW Railway
- St. Laurent Ferry
- Wingard Ferry

== See also ==
- List of rural municipalities in Saskatchewan
