= MacDowall, Saskatchewan =

Hamlet in Saskatchewan, Canada

- Organized Hamlet
- Location within Saskatchewan
- Coordinates: 53°00′50″N 106°00′50″W
- Country: Canada
- Province: Saskatchewan
- Region: Central
- Census division: 15
- Rural Municipality: Duck Lake No. 463

Government
  - Governing body: Duck Lake No. 463
  - Reeve: Marcel Perrin
  - Administrator: Karen Baynton
- Postal code: S0K 2S0
- Area code: 306

MacDowall is an organized hamlet in the Rural Municipality of Duck Lake No. 463, Saskatchewan, Canada. The hamlet is located approximately 30 kilometres (19 mi) southwest of Prince Albert and is situated on the northern edge of the Nisbet Provincial Forest, adjacent to Highway 11, also known as the Louis Riel Trail. It is a short distance northwest of the village of St. Louis, and just west of Red Deer Hill. MacDowall is located in the aspen parkland biome.

The hamlet was named for Day Hort MacDowall, an early territorial politician in the district during the 19th century.

Originally heavily forested, the region was settled slowly during the early twentieth century, largely by settlers from Eastern Europe and Britain.

== Demographics ==
In the 2021 Census of Population conducted by Statistics Canada, MacDowall had a population of 119 living in 48 of its 56 total private dwellings, a change of −4.8% from its 2016 population of 125. With a land area of 0.9 km^{2} (0.35 sq mi), it had a population density of 132.2/km^{2} (342.5/sq mi) in 2021.

== Services and clubs ==
MacDowall has one Lions Club service club, which came into existence in the 1970s. The Lions Club does various projects within the community; they also have an annual supper and dance known as the Harvest Ball. The Harvest Ball takes place near the end of the harvest season, usually in late October or early November.

They also have a Lioness Club that does many items in conjunction with the Lions Club.

== Religion ==
MacDowall has one church that lies within the hamlet. The church is a part of the Anglican church and is called St. Stephen's. In 2003 the outside of the church was remodelled to make the church wheelchair accessible.

== See also ==
- List of communities in Saskatchewan
- List of hamlets in Saskatchewan
