= Wingard, Saskatchewan =

Community in Saskatchewan, Canada

Wingard, Saskatchewan Weingarten (Danish)
- Unincorporated community
- Location within Saskatchewan
- Coordinates: 52.5547°N 106.2452°W
- Country: Canada
- Province: Saskatchewan
- Region: Central
- Census division: 15
- Rural Municipality: Duck Lake
- Established: 1882

Government
  - Governing body: Duck Lake No. 463
  - Reeve: Raymond Gauthier
  - Administrator: Amanda Harris
- Time zone: CST
- Postal code: S0K 1J0
- Area code: 306
- Highways: Highway 692

Wingard is an unincorporated community in Duck Lake No. 436, Saskatchewan, Canada. Wingard is seven miles north-east of Fort Carlton and twelve miles north-west of Duck Lake.

== History ==
Wingard history dates back to 1882 when Danish settler Nels Peterson established a farm at the site, along the North Saskatchewan River a short distance from Fort Carlton. Peterson named the settlement "Weingarten" which is Danish for "Wine Garden", but later English and Anglo-Metis settlers anglicized the name to "Wingard."

During the North-West Rebellion of 1885, Peterson and the other settlers fled to Prince Albert to escape Gabriel Dumont's victorious rebels after the Battle of Duck Lake, alongside the retreating North-West Mounted Police and Prince Albert Volunteers. They later returned to the community following the Battle of Batoche.

Wingard Ferry is the only remaining ferry on the North Saskatchewan between The Battlefords and Prince Albert. The first ferry was established by Nels Peterson in 1895, prior to that boats and scows had been used to cross the river.

Today Wingard consists of little more than a ferry, an Anglican Church, and cemetery.

== See also ==
- List of communities in Saskatchewan
