= Weldon, Saskatchewan =

Village in Saskatchewan, Canada

Weldon
- Village
- Village of Weldon
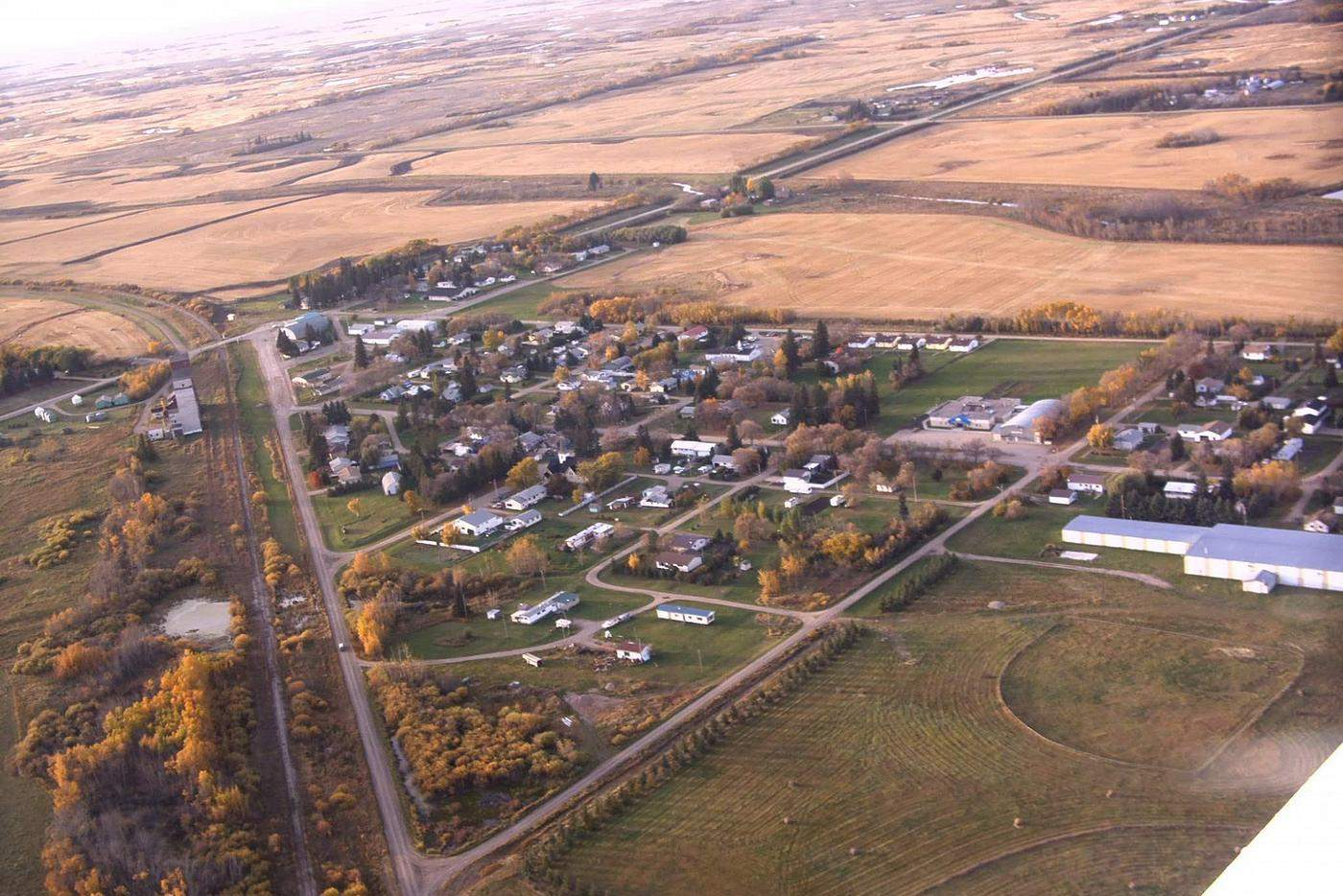
- Aerial view of Weldon

- Location within Saskatchewan Location within Canada
- Coordinates: 53°00′N 105°08′W
- Country: Canada
- Province: Saskatchewan
- Census division: 15
- Rural municipality: Kinistino No. 459
- Post office Founded: 1895

Government
  - Mayor: Howard Tarry
  - Administrator: Shelley L. Holmes
  - Governing body: Weldon Village Council

Area
  - Total: 1.00 km^{2} (0.39 sq mi)

Population (2021)
  - Total: 160
  - Density: 160/km^{2} (410/sq mi)
- Time zone: UTC−6 (CST)
- Postal code: S0J 3A0
- Area code: 306
- Highways: Highway 682

Weldon (2016 population: 197) is a village in the Canadian province of Saskatchewan within the Rural Municipality of Kinistino No. 459 and Census Division No. 15. The area is part of the aspen parkland biome. The village is located 2 kilometres (1.2 mi) north of Highway 3 at the midway point between the cities of Prince Albert and Melfort. The village is just 20 kilometres (12 mi) south of the Weldon Ferry linking it to Highway 302 and is often used as an access point to the historic Saskatchewan River Forks where the North and South Saskatchewan rivers join just 25 kilometres (16 mi) to the northeast.

== History ==
Weldon incorporated as a village on January 24, 1914.

=== 2022 stabbings ===
On the morning of Sunday, September 4, 2022, multiple people were stabbed in Weldon and the nearby James Smith Cree Nation. A total of 11 people were killed, and 17 others were injured. One of the two initial suspects, Damien Sanderson, was found dead the next day. The second suspect, Myles Sanderson, was captured on September 7, but died while in custody. On October 6, the RCMP said there was evidence that Myles was solely responsible for all eleven homicides, including Damien's.

== Demographics ==
Population history (1981–2016)
Year	Pop.	±%
1981	279	—
1986	277	−0.7%
1991	243	−12.3%
1996	225	−7.4%
2001	219	−2.7%
2006	205	−6.4%
2011	196	−4.4%
2016	197	+0.5%
2021	160	−18.8%
Source: Statistics Canada via Saskatchewan Bureau of Statistics

In the 2021 Census of Population conducted by Statistics Canada, Weldon had a population of 160 living in 68 of its 77 total private dwellings, a change of −18.8% from its 2016 population of 197. With a land area of 1 km^{2} (0.39 sq mi), it had a population density of 160.0/km^{2} (414.4/sq mi) in 2021.

In the 2016 Census of Population, the Village of Weldon recorded a population of 197 living in 77 of its 93 total private dwellings, a 0.5% change from its 2011 population of 196. With a land area of 1.1 km^{2} (0.42 sq mi), it had a population density of 179.1/km^{2} (463.8/sq mi) in 2016.

== Attractions ==
The village has a seniors citizens lodge, a seniors club, a riding club, a winter recreation centre, an auditorium/gymnasium complex, a public library, a furnished summer sports field and worship centres for one denomination as well as a non-denominational assembly. The community is known for its old growth tree-lined streets and the natural environment of the farmland in the parkland region.

Many of the residents trace their lineage back to Norwegian settlers who first established the community just after the turn of the 20th century. Weldon's senior residents hold strong links to their roots in Norway and every May 17 a large "Syttende Mai" celebration is a significant cultural event in the village. The village's population grew fivefold during its 2005 Homecoming Celebrations held during the Canada Day weekend.

The Weldon Grain Elevators have garnered attention from the online community of the video game Team Fortress 2 due to their resemblance to the map 2Fort.

== See also ==
- List of communities in Saskatchewan
- List of francophone communities in Saskatchewan
- List of villages in Saskatchewan
