= Beardy's 97 and Okemasis 96 =

Indian reserve in Saskatchewan, Canada

Coordinates: 52°48′46″N 106°20′54″W

- Indian reserve
- Beardy's Indian Reserve No. 97 & Okemasis Indian Reserve No. 96
- Location in Saskatchewan
- First Nation: Beardy's and Okemasis'
- Country: Canada
- Province: Saskatchewan

Area
  - Total: 11,324 ha (27,980 acres)

Population (2016)
  - Total: 1,323
  - Density: 11.68/km^{2} (30.26/sq mi)
- Community Well-Being Index: 52

Beardy's 97 and Okemasis 96 is an Indian reserve of the Beardy's and Okemasis' Cree Nation in Saskatchewan. It is 58 kilometres southwest of Prince Albert on the western shore of Duck Lake. In the 2016 Canadian Census, it recorded a population of 1,323 living in 301 of its 311 total private dwellings. In the same year, its Community Well-Being index was calculated at 52 of 100, compared to 58.4 for the average First Nations community and 77.5 for the average non-Indigenous community.

== See also ==
- List of Indian reserves in Saskatchewan
