= Halcrow =

Halcrow may refer to:

- George Grant Halcrow, Canadian politician
- William Halcrow (1883–1958), English civil engineer
- Halcrow Group, an engineering consultancy
- Halcrow railway station, a flag stop in Halcrow, Manitoba, Canada, on Via Rail's Winnipeg–Churchill line
- Helen Halcrow, later Helen Morgan, British politician elected 2021
