= Cecil Ferry =

Coordinates: 53.245°N 105.435°W

The Cecil Ferry is a cable ferry in the Canadian province of Saskatchewan east of Prince Albert. The ferry crosses the North Saskatchewan River, providing a link between Highways 302 and 55.

The six-car ferry is operated by the Saskatchewan Ministry of Highways and Infrastructure. The ferry is free of tolls and operates between 7:00 am and midnight, during the ice-free season. The ferry has a length of 18.2 metres (60 ft), a width of 6.25 metres (20.5 ft), and a weight limit of 31.5 tonnes (31.0 long tons; 34.7 short tons).

Of all cable ferries in the province, the Cecil Ferry carries the highest percentage of truck traffic. The ferry transports approximately 20,000 vehicles each year.

== See also ==
- List of crossings of the North Saskatchewan River
