= Titanic, Saskatchewan =

Community in Saskatchewan, Canada

Titanic
- Unincorporated community
- Location within Saskatchewan
- Coordinates: 52°51′32″N 106°25′56″W
- Country: Canada
- Province: Saskatchewan
- Rural Municipality: Duck Lake No. 463
- Census Division: No. 15
- Named for: RMS Titanic
- Time zone: UTC-6 (CST)

Titanic is an unincorporated community in the Rural Municipality of Duck Lake No. 463, Saskatchewan, Canada. It is midway between Saskatoon and Prince Albert National Park.

== History ==
Originally settled by French Canadians and named Mourey for a local Catholic priest, its postmaster applied to have the name changed to Titanic in 1912, following the tragedy of the RMS Titanic earlier that year. It was first among nearly 30 communities across the country which petitioned the postmaster general to change their names to Titanic that same year. The name "Mourey" had been adopted just seven months prior to the disaster, so historical attachment did not run deep. A new name was to honor the ship and its passengers.

The school closed in 1959, St. Anne Catholic Church closed in 1964, and the post office itself in 1967. Today, a cemetery and memorial grotto to the church that once stood can be found.

== See also ==
- List of communities in Saskatchewan
