= Rural Municipality of Rosthern No. 403 =

Rural municipality in Saskatchewan, Canada

Rosthern No. 403
- Rural municipality
- Rural Municipality of Rosthern No. 403
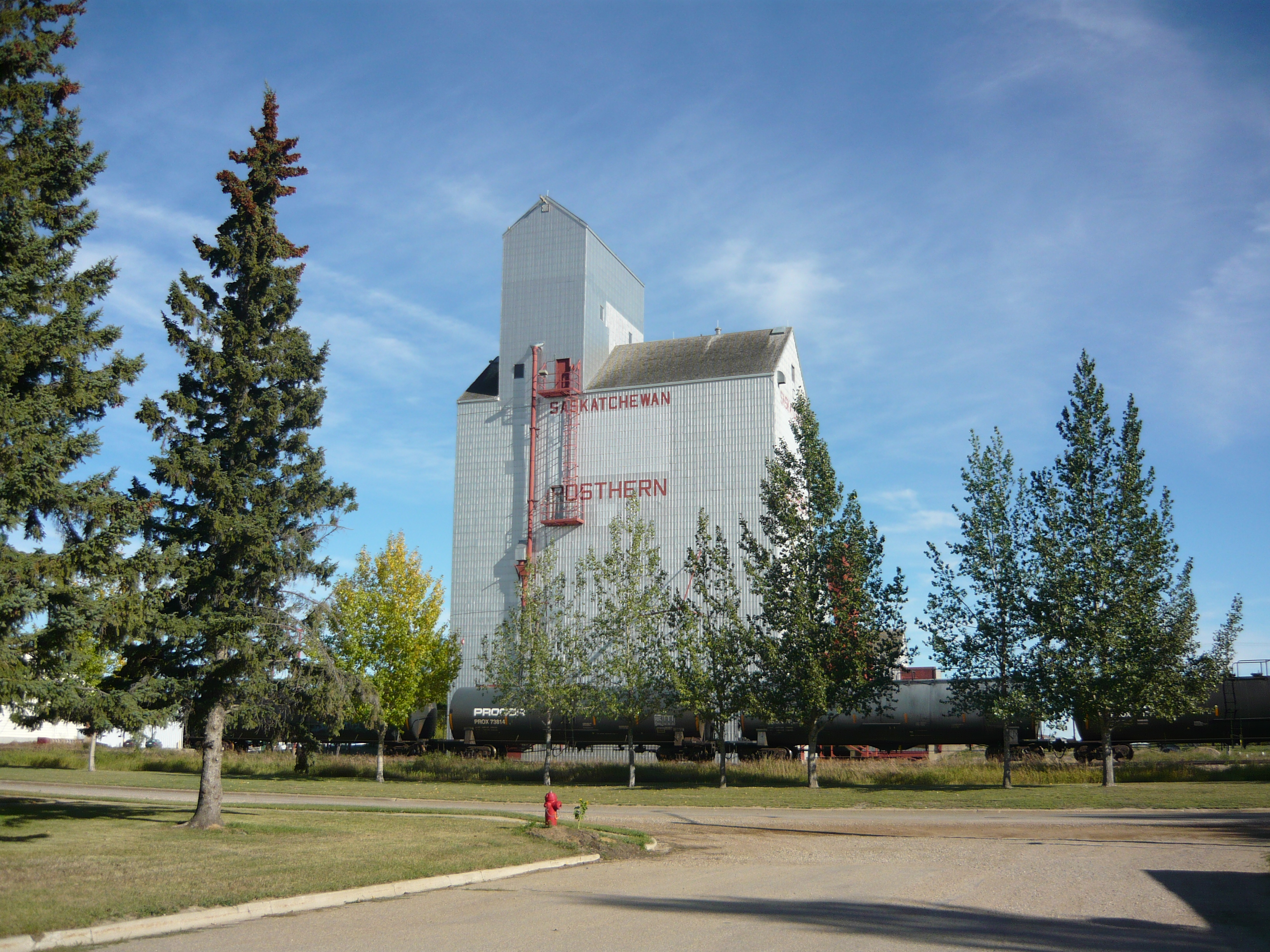
- Grain elevator in Rosthern

- Location of the RM of Rosthern No. 403 in Saskatchewan
- Coordinates: 52.587°N 106.276°W
- Country: Canada
- Province: Saskatchewan
- Census division: 15
- SARM division: 5
- Formed: December 9, 1912

Government
  - Reeve: Roger Kinzel
  - Governing body: RM of Rosthern No. 403 Council
  - Administrator: Amanda McCormick
  - Office location: Rosthern

Area (2016)
  - Land: 954.22 km^{2} (368.43 sq mi)

Population (2021)
  - Total: 2,473
  - Density: 2.6/km^{2} (6.7/sq mi)
- Time zone: CST
  - Summer (DST): CST
- Postal code: S0K 3R0
- Area codes: 306 and 639
- Highway(s): Highway 11; Highway 312; Highway 683; Highway 785
- Railway(s): CTRW
- Website: Official website

The Rural Municipality of Rosthern No. 403 (2016 population: 2,300) is a rural municipality (RM) in the Canadian province of Saskatchewan within Census Division No. 15 and SARM Division No. 5. It is located in the central portion of the province north of the City of Saskatoon.

== History ==
The RM of Rosthern No. 403 incorporated as a rural municipality on December 9, 1912.

== Demographics ==
Population history (1981–2021)
Year	Pop.	±%
1981	1,980	—
1986	1,920	−3.0%
1991	1,817	−5.4%
1996	1,816	−0.1%
2001	1,801	−0.8%
2006	1,840	+2.2%
2011	2,015	+9.5%
2016	2,300	+14.1%
2021	2,473	+7.5%
Source: Statistics Canada via Saskatchewan Bureau of Statistics

In the 2021 Census of Population conducted by Statistics Canada, the RM of Rosthern No. 403 had a population of 2,473 living in 744 of its 797 total private dwellings, a change of 7.5% from its 2016 population of 2,300. With a land area of 944.28 km^{2} (364.59 sq mi), it had a population density of 2.6/km^{2} (6.8/sq mi) in 2021.

In the 2016 Census of Population, the RM of Rosthern No. 403 recorded a population of 2,300 living in 684 of its 707 total private dwellings, a 14.1% change from its 2011 population of 2,015. With a land area of 954.22 km^{2} (368.43 sq mi), it had a population density of 2.4/km^{2} (6.2/sq mi) in 2016.

== Geography ==
=== Communities and localities ===
The following urban municipalities are surrounded by the RM.

Towns

- Rosthern
- Hague

The following unincorporated communities are within the RM.

Organized hamlets

- Blumenthal
- Neuanlage

Localities

- Arma
- Carlton
- Chortitz
- Gruenthal
- Hochstadt
- Schoenweise

== Attractions ==
- Carlton Trail
- Eigenheim Mennonite Church
- Fort Carlton
- Hague Ferry
- Mennonite Heritage Museum
- Saskatchewan River Valley Museum
- Seager Wheeler's Maple Grove Farm
- Valley Regional Park (Rosthern)

== Government ==
The RM of Rosthern No. 403 is governed by an elected municipal council and an appointed administrator that meets on the second Tuesday of every month. The reeve of the RM is Roger Kinzel while its administrator is Amanda McCormick. The RM's office is located at 1001 6th Street, Rosthern, SK.

== See also ==
- List of rural municipalities in Saskatchewan
