= Carlton, Saskatchewan =

Unincorporated hamlet in Saskatchewan, Canada

Carlton
- Unincorporated Hamlet
- Location within Saskatchewan Location within Canada
- Coordinates: 52.813°N 106.489°W
- Country: Canada
- Province: Saskatchewan
- Region: Central
- Census division: 8
- Rural municipality: Rosthern No. 403
- Established: 1912

Government
  - Governing body: Rosthern No. 403
  - Reeve: Martin Penner
  - Acting Administrator: Amanda McCormick

Area
  - Total: 0.00 km^{2} (0 sq mi)

Population (2006)
  - Total: 0
  - Density: 0/km^{2} (0/sq mi)
- Time zone: CST
- Postal code: S0K 3R0
- Area code: 306
- Highways: Highway 44; Highway 683

Carlton is an unincorporated place in the Rural Municipality of Rosthern No. 403, Saskatchewan, Canada. It is located on Highway 683, approximately 20 kilometres (12 mi) north-west of Rosthern.

== Attractions ==
=== Fort Carlton Provincial Historic Park ===
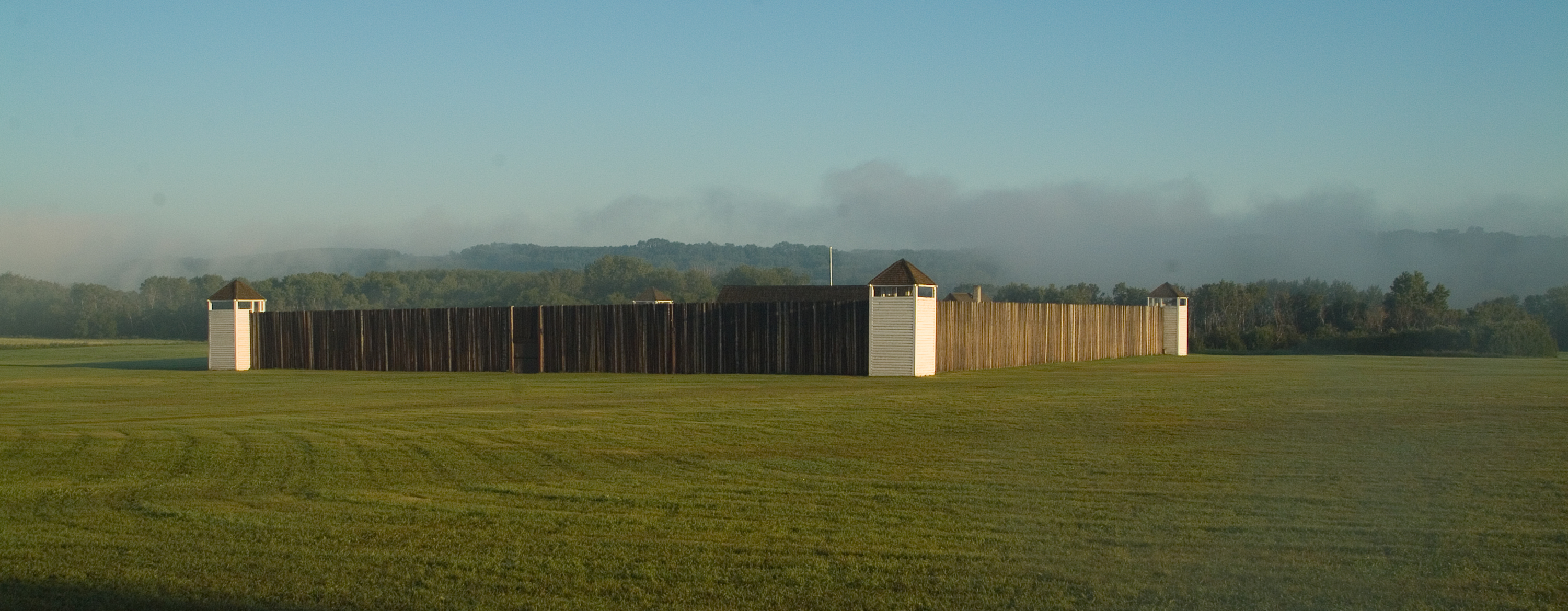
Rebuilt replica of Fort Carlton 5 km north-west of Carlton

The original site of Fort Carlton is located approximately 5 kilometres (3.1 mi) north-west of Carlton along the banks of the North Saskatchewan River. The fort was originally established as a Hudson's Bay Company fur trading post that operated between 1810 until 1885. The fort has been rebuilt by the Government of Saskatchewan and is now a provincial park and is a popular attraction located along the original Carlton Trail.

=== Carlton Trail ===
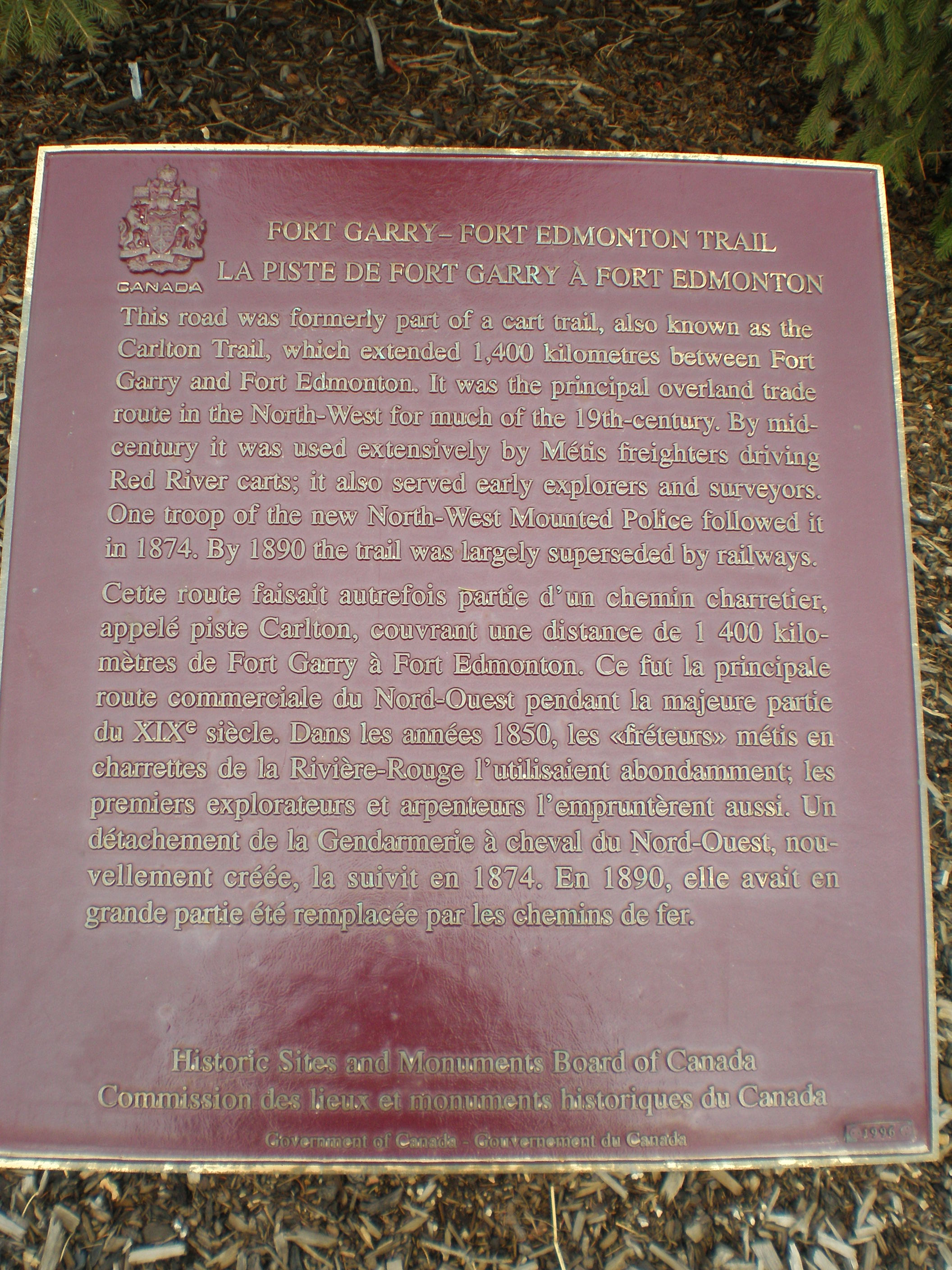
Carlton Trail plaque erected by the Historic Sites and Monuments Board of Canada

The Carlton Trail was the primary land transportation route connecting the various parts of the Canadian Northwest for most of the 19th century. It stretched from the Red River Colony up to what is today Fort Qu'Appelle, Saskatchewan via Fort Ellice. From here the trail ran north and crossed the South Saskatchewan River near Batoche, Saskatchewan until it reached Fort Carlton on the North Saskatchewan River. After this point the trail ran due west along the river to Fort Edmonton at what is now Edmonton, Alberta. The distance in total the trail travelled between Fort Garry (Winnipeg) to Upper Fort des Prairies (Edmonton) was approximately 900 miles (1,500 kilometres). Many smaller trails jutted off from the main trail, such as the Fort à la Corne Trail in the Saskatchewan Valley. Today the Trail has been designated as a National Historic Site of Canada and portions of the original Trail can still be seen.

== See also ==
- List of communities in Saskatchewan
- List of hamlets in Saskatchewan
- List of Hudson's Bay Company trading posts
- North American fur trade
