= Nisbet Provincial Forest =

Protected forest in Saskatchewan, Canada

Coordinates: 53°14′00″N 105°45′02″W

- Interactive map of Nisbet Provincial Forest

Geography
- Location: North Central Saskatchewan, Canada

The Nisbet Provincial Forest is a provincially protected mixed-wood forest surrounded by Aspen parkland in North Central Saskatchewan, Canada. It consists of a north block north of the city of Prince Albert, Saskatchewan, and a south block between Duck Lake, Saskatchewan, MacDowall, Saskatchewan and Lily Plain, Saskatchewan. The forest drew Métis and white settlers to the area during the 1860s to 1880s and was an important source of building materials and fuel in this period. Today it is a provincially protected area although cattle grazing and recreational use including cross country skiing, snowmobiling, hiking, and hunting in the area are permitted.

The Louis Riel Trail runs through the south block of the Nisbet forest. The forest was named for James Nisbet, a Presbyterian clergyman who established a mission at Prince Albert.

== See also ==
- List of Saskatchewan provincial forests
