= Lily Plain =

- Unincorporated community
- Interactive map of Lily Plain
- Coordinates: 53°9′41″N 106°8′50″W
- Country: Canada
- Province: Saskatchewan
- Census division: No. 15
- Rural Municipality: Rural Municipality of Duck Lake No. 463
- Division: 6

Government
  - Councillor: Dale Ksyniuk
  - Governing Body: Rural Municipality of Duck Lake No. 463
  - MPs: Randy Hoback (CON) – Prince Albert
  - MLAs: Delbert Kirsch (SKP) – Batoche (electoral district)

Area
  - Total: 1,046.70 km^{2} (404.13 sq mi)

Population (2006)
  - Total: 776 (Total RM)
  - Density: 0.7/km^{2} (1.8/sq mi)
- Time zone: UTC−6 (CST)
- Area code: 1-306-xxx-xxxx
- Website: Government Website on the RM

Lily Plain is an area in Saskatchewan, Canada, located approximately 20 kilometres west of Prince Albert, Saskatchewan. In the area there is a community hall called "Lily Plain Community Hall", and in the parking lot for the hall are postboxes for residents in the area. The main access into this area is the Saskatchewan Highway 302W.
