= Beardy's and Okemasis' Cree Nation =

Indigenous Canadian peoples

- Band No. 369
- People: Willow Cree
- Treaty: Treaty 6
- Headquarters: Duck Lake
- Province: Saskatchewan

Land
- Main reserve: Beardy's & Okemasis' 96 & 97
- Reserves: 96 & 97A; 96 & 97B; 96 & 97C; Willow Cree
- Land area: 203.46 km^{2} (78.56 sq mi)

Population (2019)
- On reserve: 1354
- Off reserve: 2184
- Total population: 3538

Government
- Chief: Edwin Ananas
- Council: Jeremy Seeseequasis, Sheryl Okemaysim, Delano Mike, Warren Seesequais, Marie Neubuhr, Kurt Seesequasis

Tribal Council
- Independent.

Website
- bofn9697.com

Beardy's and Okemasis' Cree Nation is a Cree First Nations band government in Saskatchewan, Canada. Their reserves include:

- Beardy's & Okemasis' 96 & 97
- Beardy's & Okemasis' 96 & 97A
- Beardy's & Okemasis' 96 & 97B
- Beardy's & Okemasis' 96 & 97C

== History & Etymology ==
The nation is named for Willow Cree Chiefs Beardy (kâmiyescawesit (Kah-mis-cho-wey-sit), "one who has a little beard") and Okemasis (okimâsis, "little chief", diminutive of okimâw). Together, they led two-thirds of the Willow Cree band and settled west of Duck Lake prior to the signing of Treaty 6 in 1876. With adjoining reserves, the two bands have since merged into a single First Nation. The Cree name for this combined reserve is ᓃᐱᓰᐦᑯᐹᐏᔨᓃᓈᕽ nîpisîhkopâwiyinînâhk, "among the Willow Cree".

The remaining Willow Cree today form the One Arrow First Nation.

The Willow Cree are a sub-group of the Plains Cree tribe located today in the geographic regions of the Saskatchewan parklands, situated on the southern edge of the Boreal Forest and northern edge of the Great Plains, also situated between the North Saskatchewan and South Saskatchewan Rivers.
