= Fenton Ferry =

Coordinates: 53°01′12″N 105°35′03″W

The Fenton Ferry is a cable ferry in the Canadian province of Saskatchewan. The ferry crosses the South Saskatchewan River, linking Highway 25 with Highway 3 via a grid road north of Fenton.

The six-car ferry is operated by the Saskatchewan Ministry of Highways and Infrastructure. The ferry is free of tolls and operates between 7:00 am and midnight, during the ice-free season.

The ferry has a length of 16.7 metres (55 ft), a width of 6 metres (20 ft), and a weight limit of 18.5 tonnes (18.2 long tons; 20.4 short tons). The ferry carries more than 7500 vehicles each year.

== See also ==
- List of crossings of the South Saskatchewan River
