= Davis, Saskatchewan =

Unincorporated community in Saskatchewan, Canada

Coordinates: 53.12572°N 105.63887°W

Location of Davis in Saskatchewan

Davis is an unincorporated community in Saskatchewan, Canada. Davis was once a village but has since shrunk to a handful of houses. It is just northwest of the Muskoday First Nation and southeast of Prince Albert in the Aspen parkland biome. Access is from Highway 3.

Davis was named for Senator Thomas Osborne Davis a prominent Prince Albert merchant and Liberal Party member in the late nineteenth and early twentieth century.

== See also ==
- List of communities in Saskatchewan
