= Ministry of Highways and Infrastructure (Saskatchewan) =

Ministry in Saskatchewan, Canada

Ministry of Highways

Organization overview
- Formed: 1917
- Employees: 1,476
- Minister responsible: Fred Bradshaw
- Parent Organization: Government of Saskatchewan
- Website: www.saskatchewan.ca/government/government-structure/ministries/highways

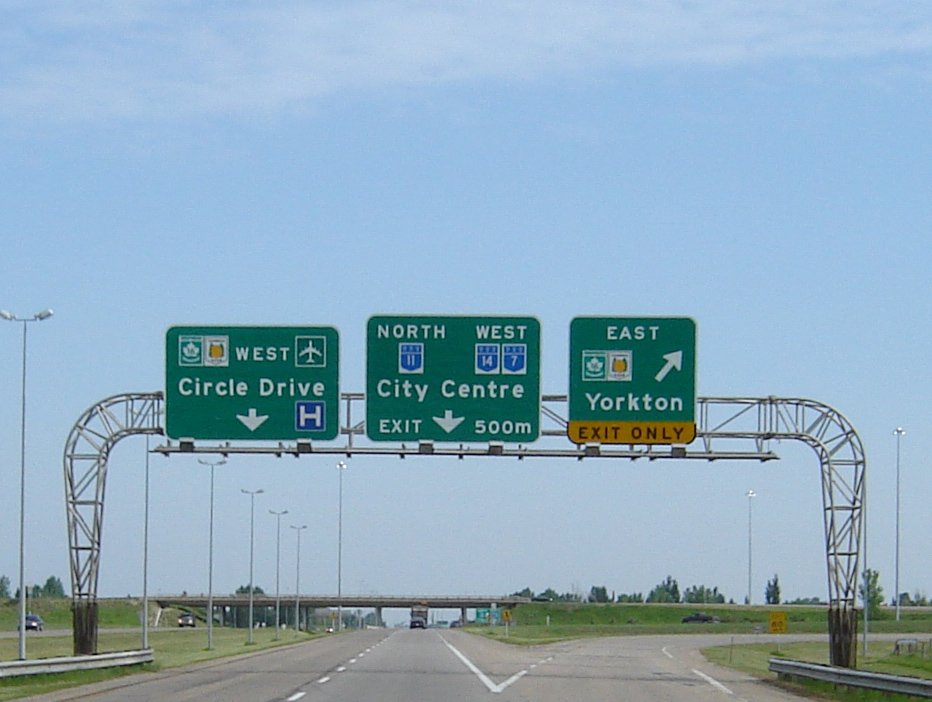
Routing of SK highways around Saskatoon

The Ministry of Highways is divided into the Operations, Policy and Programs, and Corporate Services Divisions and the Communications Branch. The ministry is the employer of over 1,476 employees diversified amongst 105 communities in Saskatchewan. The current Minister of Highways and Infrastructure is David Marit.

== Operations Division ==
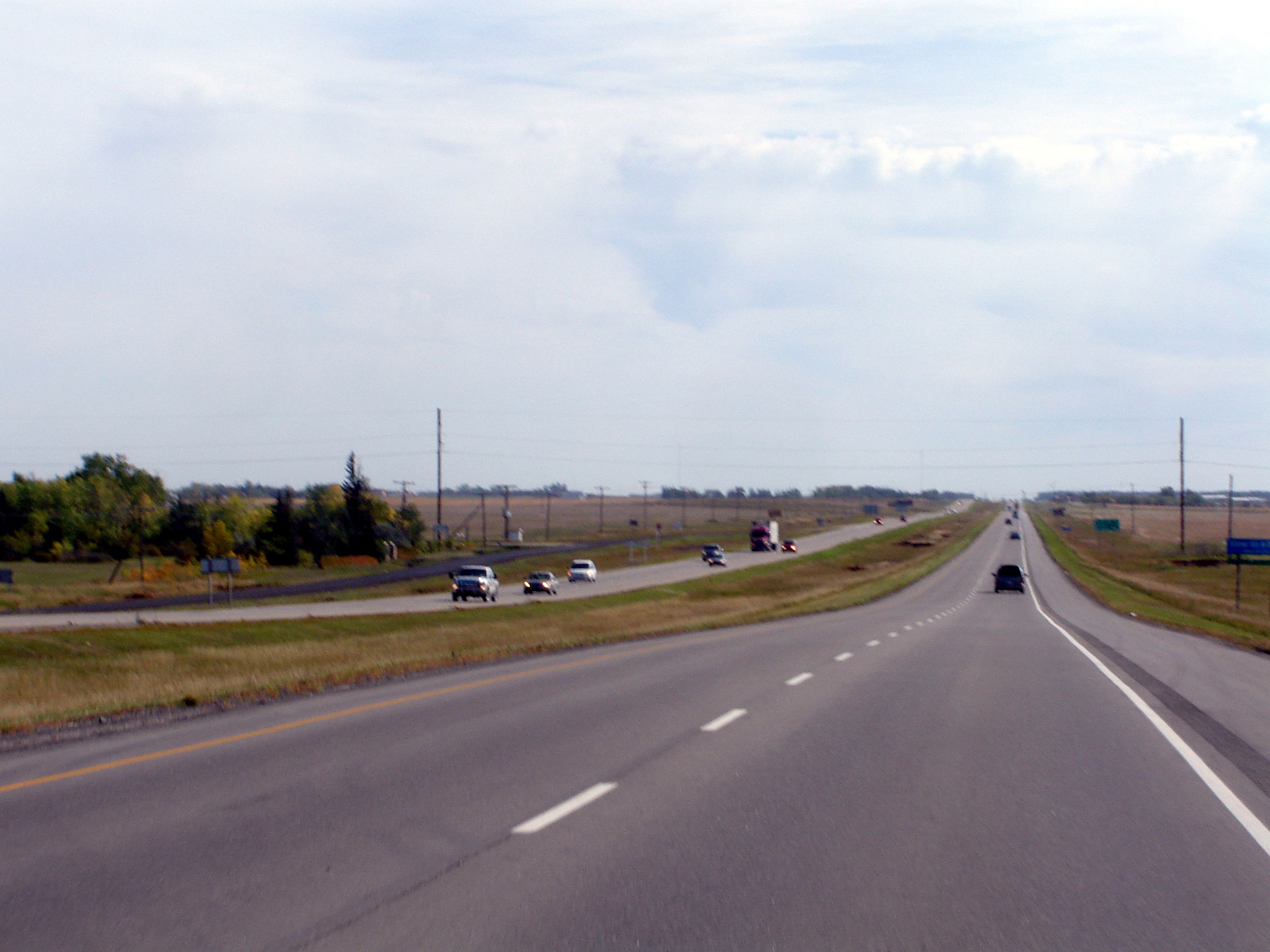
Trans Canada

The Operation Division has the responsibility of maintaining 9,249 kilometres (5,747 mi) of asphalt concrete pavements, 4,929 kilometres (3,063 mi) of granular pavements, 6,102 kilometres (3,792 mi) of thin membrane surface (TMS) highways, 5,621 kilometres (3,493 mi) of gravel highways, 171 kilometres (106 mi) of ice roads, 805 kilometres (500 mi) bridges, 453 kilometres (281 mi) large culverts, 12 ferries, one barge and 17 northern airports. Operational maintenance includes surface repair activities like crack filling, sealing, and patching; snow and ice control; pavement marking; signing; and ferry operations. Along with engineering, construction and design of the provincial road network, the operations division provides regulations, inspections and advice to the rural municipalities (R.M.) for the municipal road network.

=== Ferries ===
All ferries in Saskatchewan are operated by the Government of Saskatchewan and, with the exception of the Wollaston Barge Ferry, are toll free. All are seasonal, with ferries generally operating from mid-April to mid-November, depending on ice conditions. The ferries operated include:

- Cecil Ferry
- Clarkboro Ferry
- Estuary Ferry
- Fenton Ferry
- Hague Ferry
- Lancer Ferry
- Lemsford Ferry
- Paynton Ferry
- Riverhurst Ferry
- St. Laurent Ferry
- Weldon Ferry
- Wingard Ferry
- Wollaston Barge Ferry

== History ==
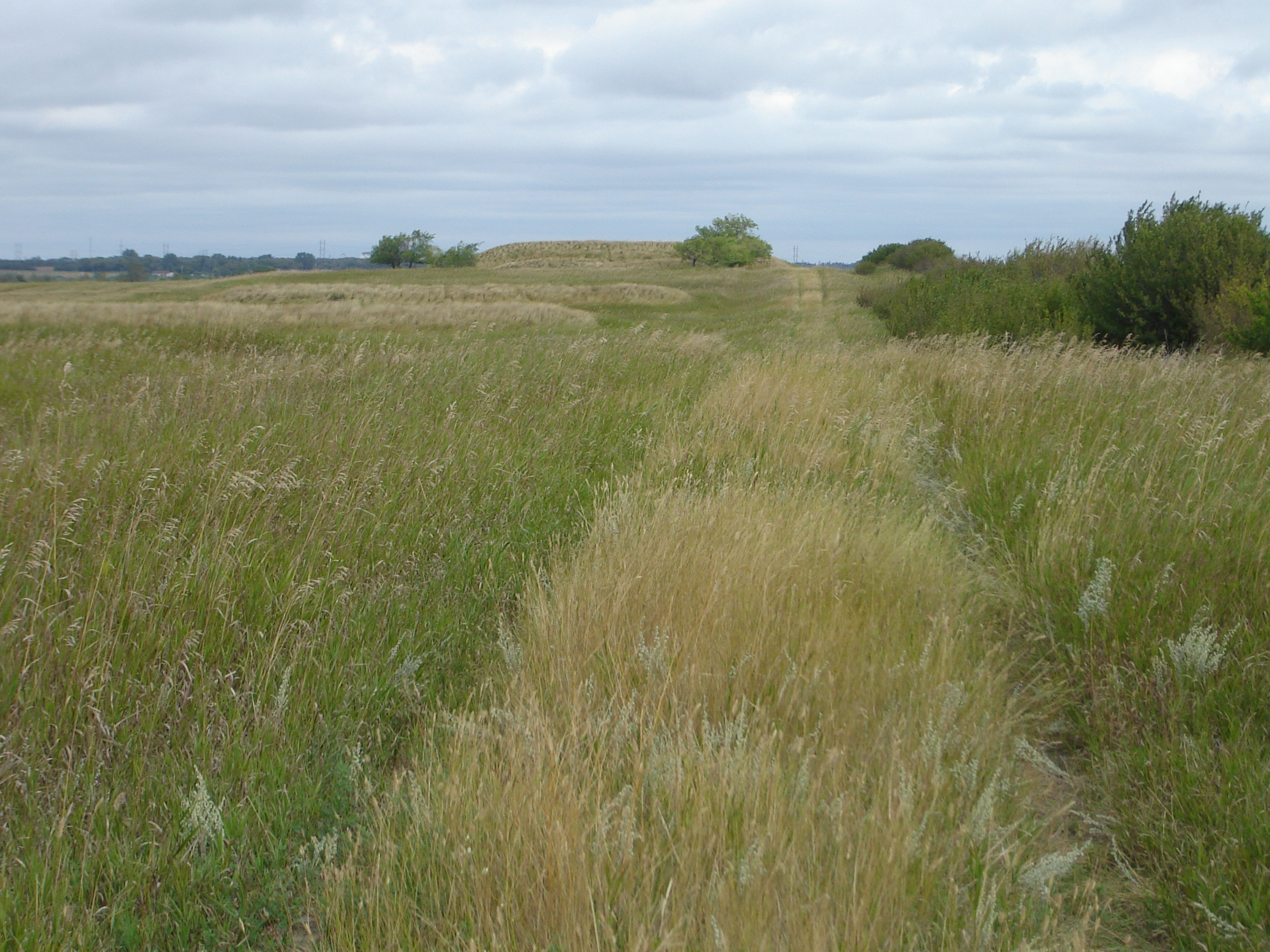
Early surveyed Road allowance precursors of roads

During the term of office for Eiling Kramer, 1972–1980, the Provincial Highway received extensive funding and paving for the entire system neared completion. Saskatchewan Highway 11 was restructured under the term of office of David Boldt, Minister 1966-1971. John T. Douglas, during his term of office 1944-1960 established the Saskatchewan Transportation Company as a Crown Corporation of the government. Alan Carl Stewart, Minister of Highways 1929-1934, allocated $20 million for highway construction in Saskatchewan. George Spence, Minister of Highways 1927-1929, was responsible for the initiation of numbering Saskatchewan highways.

The first Board of Highways Commissioners was appointed by the provincial government in 1912, and the first Department of Highways was established in 1917. On 1 September 1934, the name was changed from the Department of Highways to the Department of Highways and Transportation. Effective 21 November 2007 the Department of Highways and Transportation became the Ministry of Highways and Infrastructure.

Up until 1904 all municipal affairs were administered by the Territorial Dept. of Public Works. In 1904, [Churchbridge]...became a portion of a larger area known as a Local Improvement District of approximately 144 square miles (370 km^{2}) square miles...Road construction costs around 1900, were very low. The cost of building a road 20 feet (6.1 m) wide with an 0 feet 18 inches (0.46 m) crown cost approximately $30, per 1 mile (1.6 km)

— The First Hundred Years : Around Churchbridge, 1880-1980.

A person could work for the municipality and have his earnings put toward the taxes on his land; at one time, money collected in each Division stayed in that Division....The RM has as its responsibilities for many areas: agricultural programs and concerns in general; tax collections for needs of the municipality — road construction and maintenance; protective services — pest control, fire protection, weed control, environmental development, cultural and educational services; medical and veterinary needs and so forth.

— Tecumseh No. 65

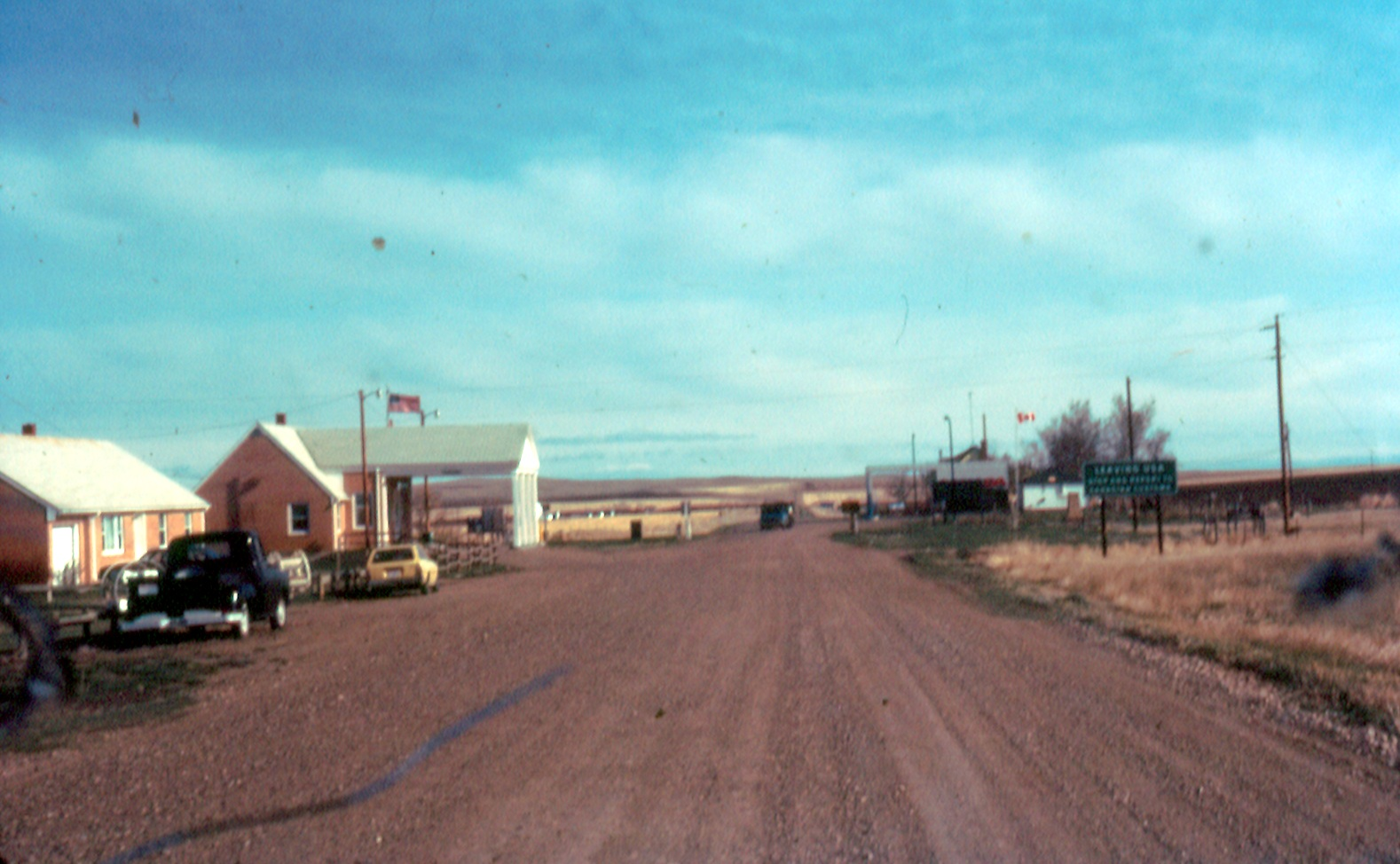
Canada–United States border Crossing near Val Marie

Originally roadwork was done by horsepower, and the municipality owned its horses and equipment. It was found that roadwork under the supervision of a councilor cost half as much as that under a road commission system. There were problems with labor. One cold November payday the whole crew quit, with not one left to even feed the horses. In 1909 a foreman shot one of his crew; the [Indian Head] council minutes make no further comment.

— History of Indian Head and District Inc., Indian Head: history of Indian Head and district (1981)

The building of these roads is under the personal supervision of the rural councilors of the R.M. The Provincial Government each year makes a substantial grant to the Municipality for permanent trunk road building.

— Moosomin, Saskatchewan. Board of Trade, Progressive Moosomin, industrial and commercial centre of Saskatchewan(1981)

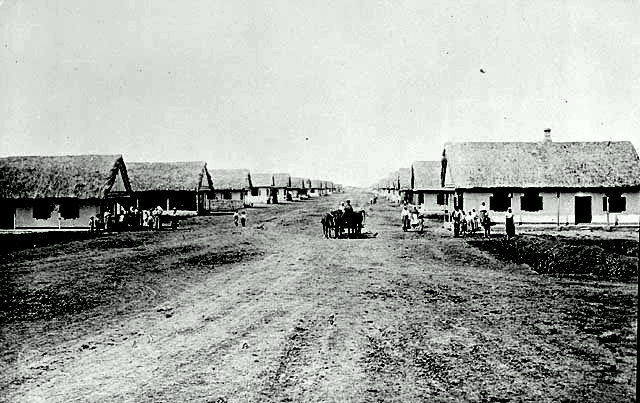
Dirt road during horse and cart era

In 1913 the road system consisted of miles of prairie trails. The roads gradually improved with the assistance of jointly funded Provincial and Municipal road programs such as the Grid Road program, the Main Farm Access program, and the Super Grid system which led to the eventual formation of Municipal Maintenance Areas. The RM's of Gull Lake, Carmichael, and Webb formed Maintenance Area No. 1, the first in the Province.

— Sask Biz Piapot No. 110

== Policy and Programs Division ==
The Policy and Programs Division works with other legislative and regulatory agencies to ensure an optimal transportation network is provided via road, rail, air, and marine.

== Corporate Services Division ==
Corporate Services Division is responsible for the budgeting, finances, and forecasting for the needs of the Ministry of Highways and Infrastructure.

== Communications Branch ==
The Communications Branch of the Ministry of Highways and Infrastructure maintains the news releases, safety awareness and education programs.

== Area Transportation Planning Support Program ==
Area Transportation Planning (ATP) Support Program analyzes transportation in regional areas to provide funding for regional needs. Committees which comprise representatives from the local rural and urban municipalities, Regional Economic Development Authorities (REDA), Saskatchewan Urban Municipalities Association, Saskatchewan Association of Rural Municipalities, and Highways and Infrastructure analyze local needs and the effects of the increased use of grain via truck transportation and the decreased use of rail transport is having on road infrastructure. There are currently 9 committees which comprise the majority of Saskatchewan except for an area near La Ronge and Southend.

- Athabasica Basin Transportation Planning Committee
- North North West Transportation Planning Committee
- North North East Transportation Planning Committee
- West Central Transportation Planning Committee
- Central Transportation Planning Committee
- North East Area Transportation Planning Committee
- East Central Transportation Planning Committee
- South East Transportation Planning Committee
- South Central Transportation Planning Committee
- Southwest Transportation Planning Committee

== The Strategic Partnership Program ==
The Strategic Partnership Program analyzes low traffic volume thin membrane surface highways working with rural municipalities and First Nation agencies to provide an effective and operational traffic flow between thin membrane surface highways and the provincial network.

== Community Airport Partnership ==
Community Airport Partnership (CAP) provides a mandate to the Ministry of Highways and Infrastructure to maintain and assist southern airport infrastructure.

== Adopt-A-Highway Program ==
Groups or individuals may sponsor a 3 kilometres (1.9 mi) stretch of highway to pick up litter and maintain highway appearances.

== Past ministers ==
Ministers historically
Term	Minister	Title	Administration	Source
2024 – Present	Honourable David Marit	Highways and Transportation Minister	under Scott Moe	
2022 – 2024	Honourable Lori Carr	Highways and Transportation Minister	under Scott Moe	
6 January 2020 – 2022	Honourable Fred Bradshaw	Highways and Transportation Minister	under Scott Moe	
20 November 2020 – 6 January 2020	Honourable Joe Hargrave	Highways and Transportation Minister	under Scott Moe	
21 November 2007	Honourable Wayne Elhard	Highways and Transportation Minister	under Brad Wall	
12 October 2001 – 21 November 2007	Honourable Mark Wartman	Highways and Transportation Minister	under Lorne Calvert	
8 February 2001 – 12 October 2001	Honourable Patricia Atkinson	Highways and Transportation Minister	under Lorne Calvert	
30 September 1999 – 8 February 2001	Honourable Maynard Sonntag	Highways and Transportation Minister	under Roy Romanow	
27 June 1997 – 30 September 1999	Honourable Judy Llewellyn Bradley	Highways and Transportation Minister	under Roy Romanow	
29 April 1997 – 27 June 1997	Honourable Clay J. Serby	Highways and Transportation Minister	under Roy Romanow	
20 September 1993 – 25 April 1997	Honourable Andrew (Andy) L.J. Renaud	Highways and Transportation Minister	under Roy Romanow	
4 June 1993 – 20 September 1993	Honourable Darrel Cunningham	Highways and Transportation Minister	under Roy Romanow	
29 September 1992 – 4 June 1993	Honourable Murray James Koskie	Highways and Transportation Minister	under Roy Romanow	
1 November 1991 – 29 September 1992	Honourable Bernhard H. Wiens	Highways and Transportation Minister	under Roy Romanow	
3 October 1989 – 1 November 1991	Honourable Sherwin Petersen	Highways and Transportation Minister	under Grant Devine	
16 December 1985 – 3 October 1989	Honourable Grant Milton Hodgins	Highways and Transportation Minister	under Grant Devine	
4 December 1985 – 16 December 1985	Honourable Donald Grant Devine	Highways and Transportation Minister	under Grant Devine	
8 May 1982 – 4 December 1985	Honourable James William Arthur Garner	Highways and Transportation Minister	under Grant Devine	
16 December 1980 – 8 May 1982	Honourable Robert Gavin Long	Highways and Transportation Minister	under Allan Blakeney	
12 May 1972 – 16 December 1980	Honourable Eiling Kramer	Highways and Transportation Minister	under Allan Blakeney	
30 June 1971 – 12 May 1972	Honourable Neil Erland Byers	Highways and Transportation Minister	under Allan Blakeney	
18 October 1966 – 30 June 1971	Honourable David Boldt	Highways and Transportation Minister	under Ross Thatcher	
22 May 1964 – 18 October 1966	Honourable Gordon Burton Grant	Highways and Transportation Minister	under Ross Thatcher	
7 November 1961 – 22 May 1964	Honourable Clarence George Willis	Highways and Transportation Minister	under Woodrow Stanley Lloyd	
1 August 1960 – 7 November 1961	Honourable Clarence George Willis	Highways and Transportation Minister	under Tommy Douglas	
10 July 1944 – 1 August 1960	Honourable John T. Douglas	Highways and Transportation Minister	under Tommy Douglas	
1 December 1938 – 10 July 1944	Honourable Arthur Thomas Procter	Highways and Transportation Minister	under William John Patterson	
3 November 1938 – 1 December 1938	Honourable William Franklin Kerr	Highways and Transportation Minister	under William John Patterson	
1 November 1935 – 3 November 1938	Honourable Charles Morton Dunn	Highways and Transportation Minister	under William John Patterson	
1 September 1934 – 1 November 1935	Honourable Charles Morton Dunn	Highways and Transportation Minister	under James Garfield Gardiner	
19 July 1934 – 1 September 1934	Honourable Charles Morton Dunn	Minister of Highways	under James Garfield Gardiner	
9 September 1929 – 19 July 1934	Honourable Alan Carl Stewart	Minister of Highways	under James T.M. Anderson	
8 December 1927 – 9 September 1929	Honourable George Spence	Minister of Highways	under James Garfield Gardiner	
10 November 1926 – 8 December 1927	Honourable William John Patterson	Minister of Highways	under James Garfield Gardiner	
5 April 1922 – 10 November 1926	Honourable James Garfield Gardiner	Minister of Highways	under Charles Avery Dunning	
14 June 1921 – 5 April 1922	Honourable Charles McGill Hamilton	Minister of Highways	under William Melville Martin	
20 October 1917 – 14 June 1921	Honourable Samuel John Latta	Minister of Highways	under William Melville Martin	
2 April 1917 – 20 October 1917	Honourable James Alexander Calder	Minister of Highways	under William Melville Martin	
1916 to 1922	None	No Department est.	under William Melville Martin	
1905–1916	Honourable James Alexander Calder	Minister of Railways, Telephones and Highways	under Thomas Walter Scott	

== Statistics ==
Road lengths presently and historically
Type	Length	Year	Source
Railway track:	95,137 kilometres (59,115 mi)	2007	
Highways, roads and streets:	198,239 kilometres (123,180 mi)	2007	
Paved, two-lane:	11,822 kilometres (7,346 mi)	2007	
Paved, four-lane, divided:	2,356 kilometres (1,464 mi)	2007	
Oil treatments:	6,102 kilometres (3,792 mi)	2007	
Gravel and other:	5,752 kilometres (3,574 mi)	2007	
Total Provincial Highways:	26,032 kilometres (16,176 mi)	2007	
Asphalt concrete pavements:	9,249 kilometres (5,747 mi)	2007	
Granular pavements:	4,929 kilometres (3,063 mi)	2007	
Thin membrane surface:	6,102 kilometres (3,792 mi)	2007	
Gravel highways:	5,621 kilometres (3,493 mi)	2007	
Ice roads:	171 kilometres (106 mi)	2007	
Large culverts:	453 kilometres (281 mi)	2007	
Bridges:	805 kilometres (500 mi)	2007	
Ferries:	12	2007	
Northern Airports:	17	2007	
Portland Cement Concrete:	0	1948-49	
Bituminous Pavements:	0	1948-49	
Bituminous Surface:	498 miles (801 km)	1948-49	
Gravel/Crushed Stone:	12,647 miles (20,353 km)	1948-49	
Other Surfaces:	62 miles (100 km)	1948-49	
Total Surfaced Road:	13,207 miles (21,255 km)	1948-49	
Improved Earth:	77,779 miles (125,173 km)	1948-49	
Other Earth Roads:	121,992 miles (196,327 km)	1948-49	
Total Non Surfaced Road:	199,771 miles (321,500 km)	1948-49	
Road Total:	212,978 miles (342,755 km)	1948-49	

== See also ==
- Roads in Saskatchewan
- List of Saskatchewan provincial highways
- Numbered highways in Canada
- Transportation in Saskatchewan
