= Red Deer Hill =

Community in Saskatchewan, Canada

- Community
- Location within Prince Albert No. 461 Location within Saskatchewan
- Coordinates: 53°01′00″N 105°48′00″W
- Country: Canada
- Province: Saskatchewan
- Rural municipality: Prince Albert No. 461

Government
  - Reeve: Eric Schmalz
  - Member of Legislative Assembly (MLA): Delbert Kirsch
  - Member of Parliament (MP): Randy Hoback, Conservative Party of Canada
- Elevation: 443 m (1,453 ft)
- Time zone: UTC-6 (CST)

Red Deer Hill (formerly named Aaskana) is a community in Saskatchewan, Canada south of Prince Albert and north of St. Louis. First settlement occurred in the 1870s and 1880s by Anglo-Metis from Manitoba, and the area took its name from a large hill which in the early days was populated by many elk or "red deer". The area is part of the aspen parkland biome.

Red Deer Hill used to have a gas station at the bottom of the hill going south. It would close down some years later and a house would be built.

The Red Deer Hill post office was previously known as Aaskana, and was founded in 1888. At the time, it was part of the District of Saskatchewan in the North-West Territories, a precursor to the province. It changed name in 1897, and was located at the legal land description of Section 32, Township 46, Range 26, West of the 2nd Meridian. Later the post office was located at the North West 1/4 Section .18, Township 46, Range 26, West of the 2nd Meridian.

The Red Deer Hill area is mainly a farming community. Grain, cattle, and horses are the main items farmed in the area.

== Education ==
=== Current education ===
Osborne School

Location
- R.R. #2, Site 10, Comp #48; Prince Albert, Canada, Saskatchewan, S6V 5P9

Information
- School type: Elementary
- School board: Saskatchewan Rivers School Division
- Grades: K to 8
- Enrolment: 87
- Education system: Public
- Sports: Basketball; Track & Field; Volleyball
- Team name: Osborne Stingers
- Website: Osborne School

Red Deer Hill has an elementary school called Osborne. It is located on Osborne Road and is a part of the Saskatchewan Rivers School Division. Osborne opened in the late '60's. It at one time had over 200 students. It is now down to about 95.

=== Historical education ===
The one room school house of Red Deer Hill School District #17 opened in the area of Townships 46,47 Ranges 27,28 West of the 2nd Meridian in 1885.

== Government and politics ==
Red Deer Hill is in the Rural Municipality of Prince Albert No. 461. The current reeve is Eric Schmalz while Colin Sheldon is councilor for division 5 which encompasses the area.

Provincially, Delbert Kirsch is the Saskatchewan Party MLA for Batoche riding in which he has been serving since 2003.

Federally, Randy Hoback is the Conservative Party MP for the riding of Price Albert in which he has been serving since 2008.
