= Wingard Ferry =

Cable ferry in Saskatchewan, Canada

Coordinates: 52.945°N 106.434°W

The Wingard Ferry is a cable ferry in the Canadian province of Saskatchewan near Wingard, Saskatchewan. The ferry crosses the North Saskatchewan River, as part of Grid Road 783.

The six-car ferry is operated by the Saskatchewan Ministry of Highways and Infrastructure. The ferry is free of tolls and operates between 7:00 am and midnight, during the ice-free season. The ferry has a length of 16.7 metres (55 ft), a width of 6.7 metres (22 ft), and a load limit of 18.5 tonnes (18.2 long tons; 20.4 short tons).

The ferry transports approximately 10,000 vehicles a year.

== See also ==
- List of crossings of the North Saskatchewan River
