= Halcro =

Hamlet in Saskatchewan, Canada

Coordinates: 53.019°N 105.796°W

- Hamlet
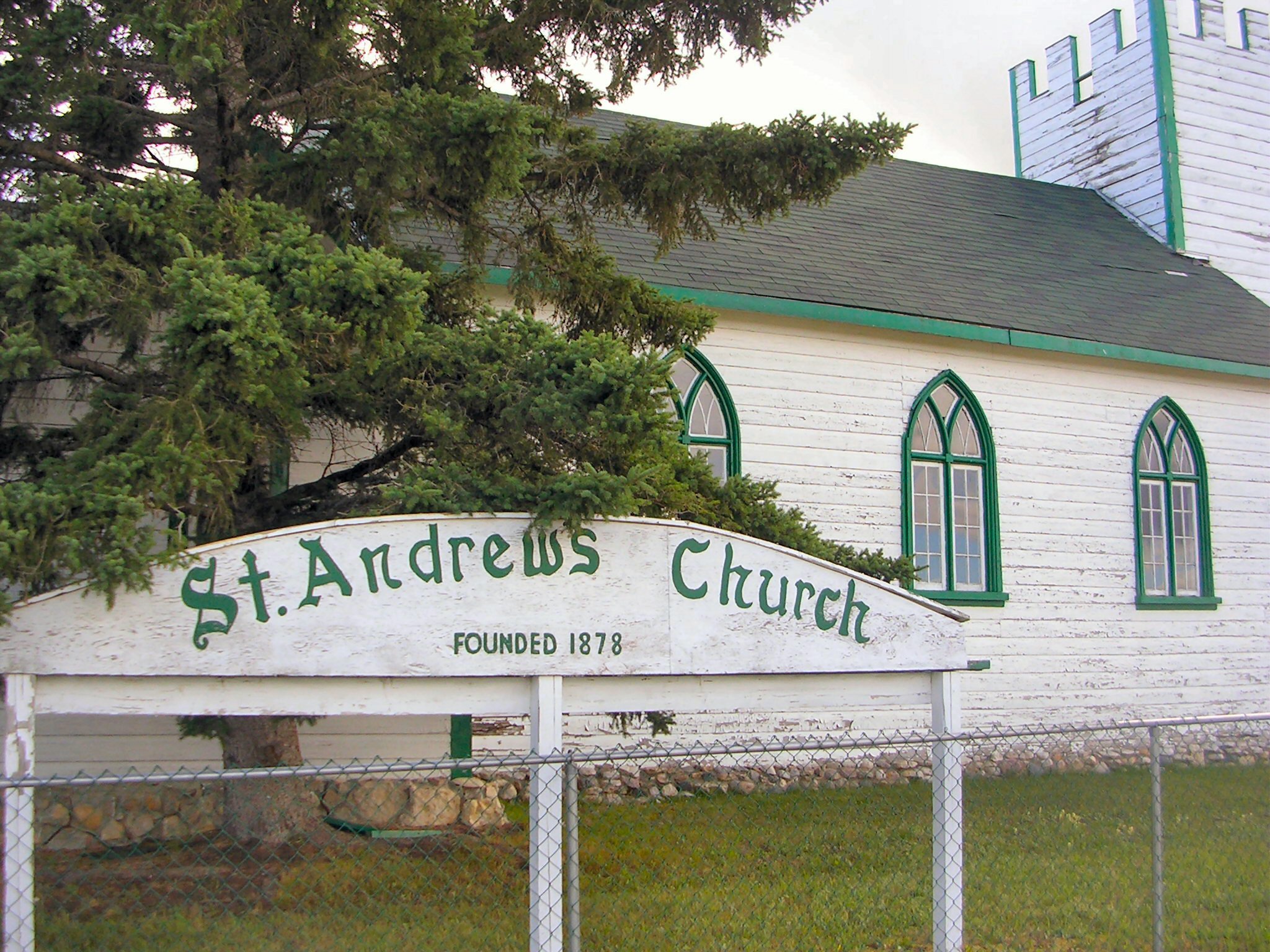
- St. Andrew's Church
- Interactive map of Halcro
- Country: Canada
- Province: Saskatchewan
- Census division: 15
- Rural Municipality: Prince Albert

Government
  - Type: Municipal government
  - Administrator RM Reeve: Norma Sheldon
  - Governing body: Prince Albert No. 461
- Postal code: S6V 5P9
- Area code: 306

Halcro or St. Andrew's is a district in Saskatchewan, Canada, north of St. Louis and south of Prince Albert. Adjacent to the South Saskatchewan River, it was initially settled by Anglo-Metis from Manitoba in the 1870s. Halcro is located in the aspen parkland biome.

Louis Riel held Métis Resistance meeting at Halcro in 1884. The following year, after the Battle of Batoche, he briefly sheltered in the hamlet before his surrender and execution.

== Education ==
Red Deer Hill has an elementary school called Osborne. It is located on Osborne Road and is a part of the Saskatchewan Rivers School Division.

Osborne opened in the late 1960s. It at one time had over 200 students; enrolment is now about half of that.

== Religion ==
Halcro has an Anglican church called St. Andrew's. The building was moved from Colleston to its present site, on Halcro Church Road, in 1903. The adjoining pioneer cemetery dates to c. 1882. The church has a fieldstone foundation and gothic-arch windows, and the site has a view of the South Saskatchewan River. The church and its cemetery were designated as a municipal heritage property in 1992 and were listed on the national register in 2009. Early in 2006, the church was vandalized and the consensus was to demolish it. But after a meeting was held in Birch Hills, they decided that the foundation was in good enough condition that it could be fixed.
