= Weldon Ferry =

Coordinates: 53.183°N 105.162°W

The Weldon Ferry is a cable ferry in the Canadian province of Saskatchewan. The ferry crosses the South Saskatchewan River, linking the northern terminus of Highway 682 with the southern terminus of Highway 302, north of Weldon.

The six-car ferry is operated by the Saskatchewan Ministry of Highways and Infrastructure. The ferry is free of tolls and operates between 6:30 AM and midnight, during the ice-free season. The ferry has a length of 18.2 metres (60 ft), a width of 6.25 metres (20.5 ft), and a load limit of 31.5 tonnes (31.0 long tons; 34.7 short tons).

The ferry transports approximately 20,000 vehicles a year.

== See also ==
- List of crossings of the South Saskatchewan River
