= Duck Lake, Saskatchewan =

Town in Saskatchewan, Canada

Town of Duck Lake
- Town
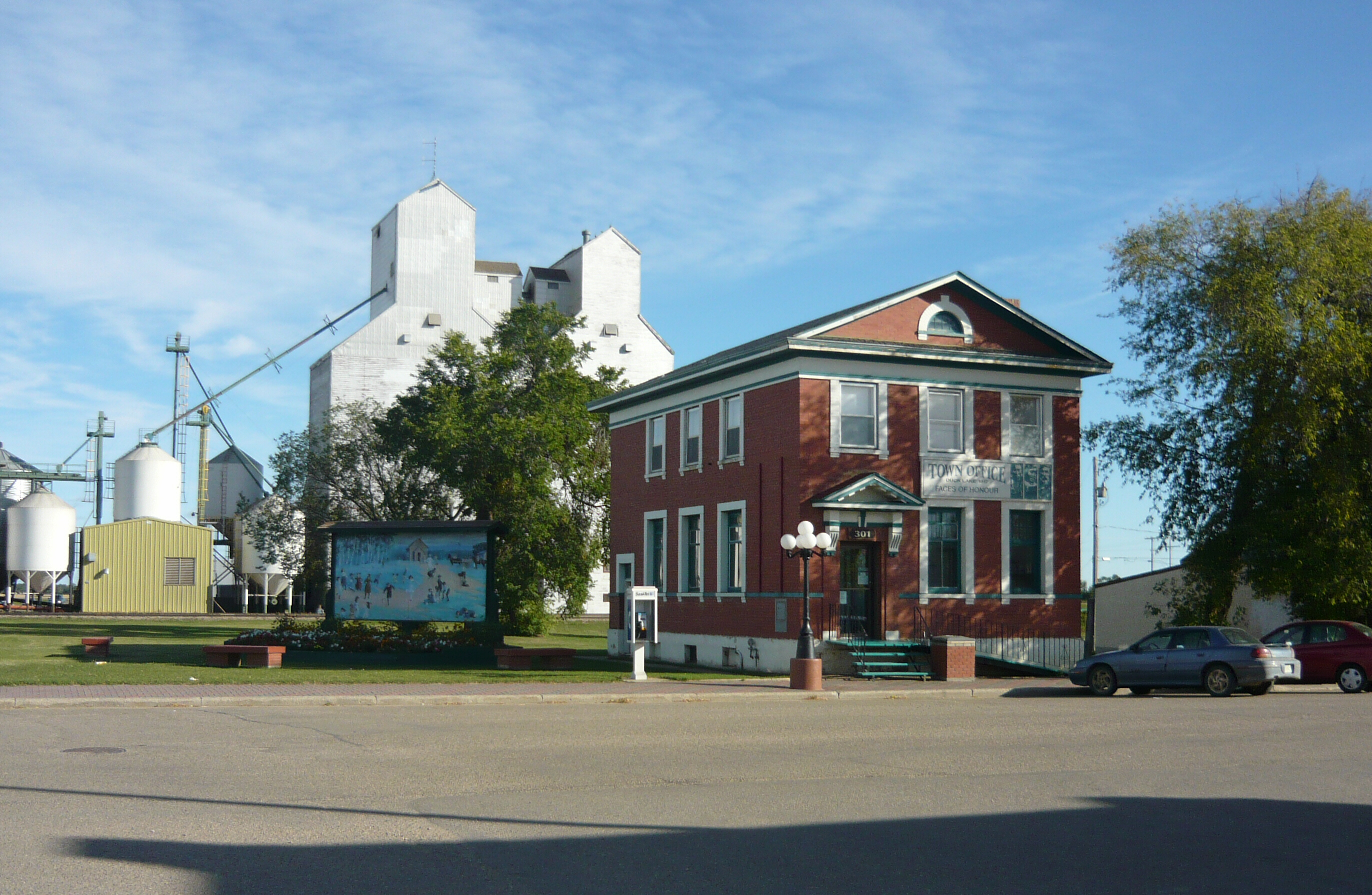
- Duck Lake Town Office

- Location of Duck Lake Town of Duck Lake (Canada)
- Coordinates: 52°48′44″N 106°13′34″W
- Country: Canada
- Province: Saskatchewan
- Rural municipality: Duck Lake No. 463
- Post office established: 1879
- Village Incorporated: 1898
- Town Incorporated: 1911

Government
  - Mayor: Jason Anderson
  - Town Administrator: Michelle Zurakowski
  - Governing body: Duck Lake Town Council

Area (2021)
  - Land: 2.38 km^{2} (0.92 sq mi)

Population (2021)
  - Total: 579
  - Density: 243.3/km^{2} (630/sq mi)
- Time zone: UTC−06:00 (CST)
- Postal code: S0K 1J0
- Area code: 306
- Highways: Highway 11; Highway 212
- Waterbodies: Duck Lake
- Website: Official Site

Duck Lake is a town in the boreal forest of central Saskatchewan, Canada. Its location is 88 kilometres (55 mi) north of Saskatoon and 44 kilometres (27 mi) south of Prince Albert on Highway 11, in the Rural Municipality of Duck Lake No. 463. Immediately to the north of Duck Lake is the south block of the Nisbet Provincial Forest and to the south-west is Duck Lake, for which the town is named after.

The First Nations people are Cree and the band government of the Beardy's and Okemasis' Cree Nation is located here.

Duck Lake was home to one of the last operating schools in the Canadian Indian residential school system, the St. Michael's Indian Residential School (Duck Lake Indian Residential School), which closed in 1996.

== History ==
Duck Lake (French: Lac-aux-Canards) was one of the five Southbranch Settlements settled by French-speaking Métis from Manitoba in the 1860s and 1870s. A Roman Catholic Mission was established in Duck Lake in 1874 by Father André O.M.I. and by 1888 the village had a school, a post office (called Stobart), a flour mill (gristmill) and a trading post. From 1882 to 1905 Duck Lake was within the District of Saskatchewan, one of several districts of the Northwest Territories.

In 1885, Duck Lake was the site of the Battle of Duck Lake, a conflict between Métis warriors and the Government of Canada, at the start of the North-West Rebellion. At Duck Lake, the Prince Albert Trail, which ran from Regina to Prince Albert, crossed the Carlton Trail and it marked the halfway point between the Métis headquarters at Batoche and the North-West Mounted Police at Fort Carlton.

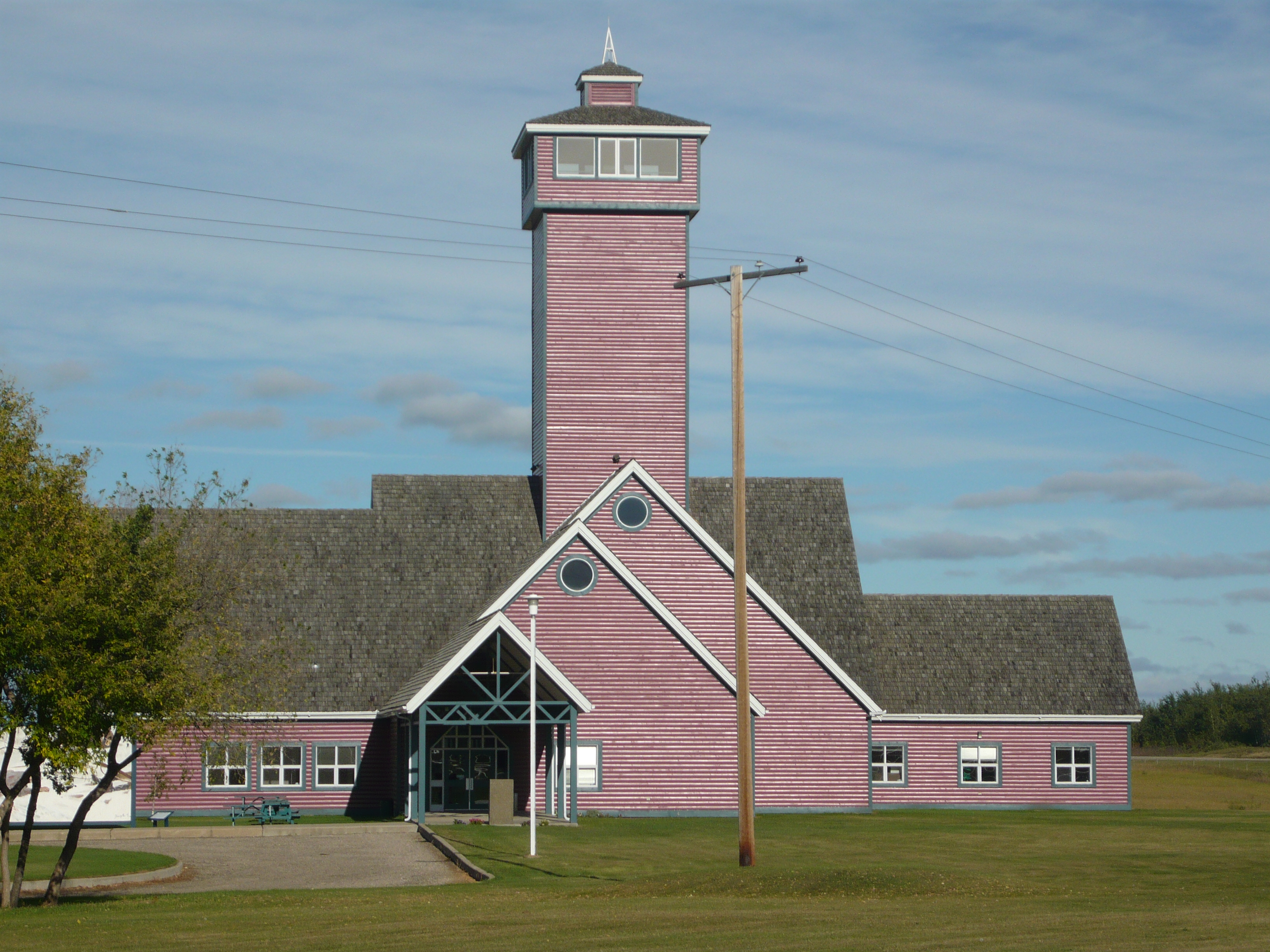
Duck Lake Regional Interpretive Centre

Historic Carpenter Gothic style All Saints Anglican Church built in 1896 is a municipal heritage site. Its historic cemetery contains the graves of some of those who fought in the Battle of Duck Lake as well as those of other pioneers of the community.

The 1973 western Alien Thunder was partially filmed here.

== Demographics ==
In the 2021 Canadian census conducted by Statistics Canada, Duck Lake had a population of 579 living in 202 of its 232 total private dwellings, a change of 1.8 per cent from its 2016 population of 569. With a land area of 2.38 km^{2} (0.92 sq mi), it had a population density of 243.3/km^{2} in 2021.

Canada census – Duck Lake community profile

	2021	2011
Population	579 (+1.8% from 2016)	577 (-4.6% from 2006)
Land area	2.38 km^{2} (0.92 sq mi)	2.73 km^{2} (1.05 sq mi)
Population density	243.3/km^{2} (630/sq mi)	211.6/km^{2} (548/sq mi)
Median age	36.0 (M: 35.2, F: 36.4)	41.2 (M: 41.1, F: 41.2)
Private dwellings	232 (total) 202 (occupied)	227 (total)
Median household income	$65,500

References: 2021 2011

== Notable people ==
- Gabriel Dumont — Leader of Métis forces in the North-West Rebellion 1885.

== See also ==
- History of the Northwest Territories
- List of francophone communities in Saskatchewan
