= Allan Hills (disambiguation) =

Allan Hills are hills in Antarctica.

Allan Hills may also refer to:

- Allan Hills (Saskatchewan), hills in Saskatchewan
- Allan Hills, Saskatchewan, a community in Saskatchewan
- Allan Hills 84001, a fragment of a Martian meteorite
- Allan Hills 77005, a fragment of a Martian meteorite
- Allan Hills A81005, the first lunar meteorite found on Earth

== See also ==
- Allan Hill, demographer
- Allan C. Hill, circus owner[
- Allen Hill (disambiguation)
