= Nomad =

Person without fixed habitat

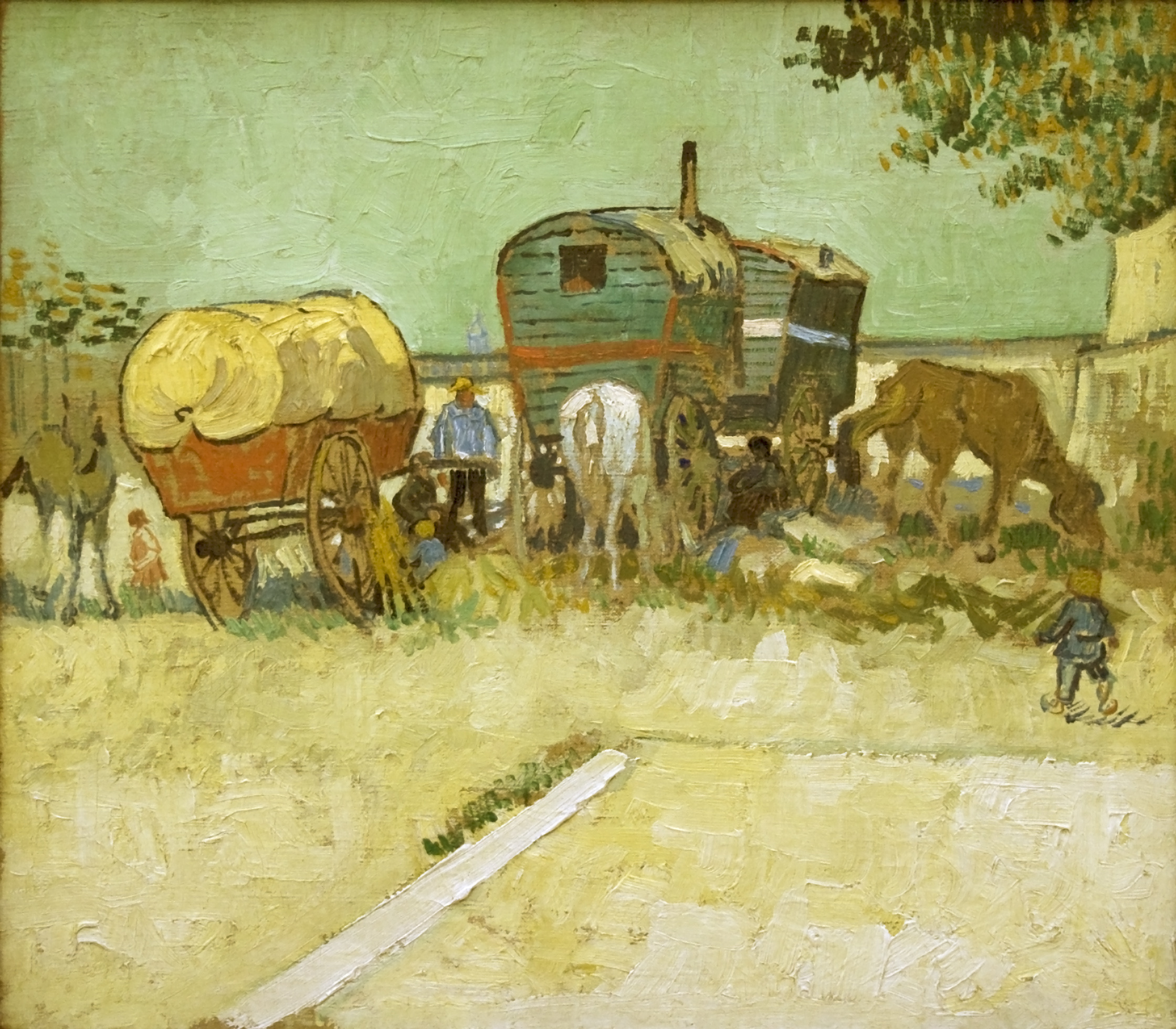
A painting by Vincent van Gogh depicting a caravan of nomadic Roma

Nomads are communities without fixed habitation who regularly move to and from areas. Such groups include hunter-gatherers, pastoral nomads (owning livestock), tinkers and trader nomads. In the twentieth century, the population of nomadic pastoral tribes slowly decreased, reaching an estimated 30–40 million nomads in the world as of 1995.

Nomadic hunting and gathering—following seasonally available wild plants and game—is by far the oldest human subsistence method known. Pastoralists raise herds of domesticated livestock, driving or accompanying them in patterns that normally avoid depleting pastures beyond their ability to recover. Nomadism is also a lifestyle adapted to infertile regions such as steppe, tundra, or ice and sand, where mobility is the most efficient strategy for exploiting scarce resources. For example, many groups living in the tundra are reindeer herders and are semi-nomadic, following forage for their animals.

Sometimes also described as "nomadic" are various itinerant populations who move among densely populated areas to offer specialized services (crafts or trades) to their residents—external consultants, for example. These groups are known as "peripatetic nomads".

== Etymology ==
The English word nomad comes from the Middle French nomade, from Latin nomas ("wandering shepherd"), from the Ancient Greek νομᾰ́ς (nomás, "roaming, wandering, esp. to find pasture"), which is derived from the Ancient Greek νομός (nomós, "pasture").

== Common characteristics ==
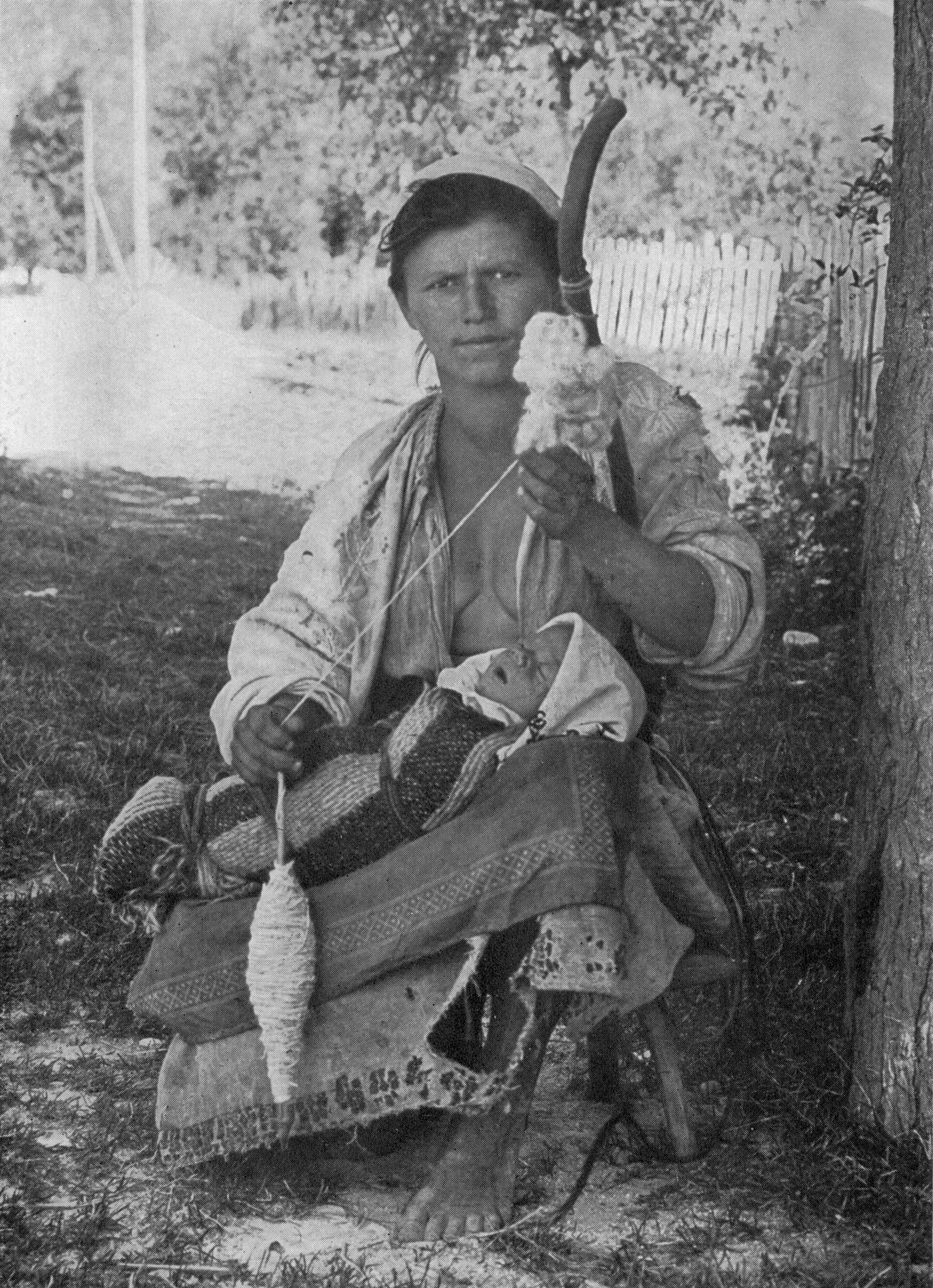
Roma mother and child

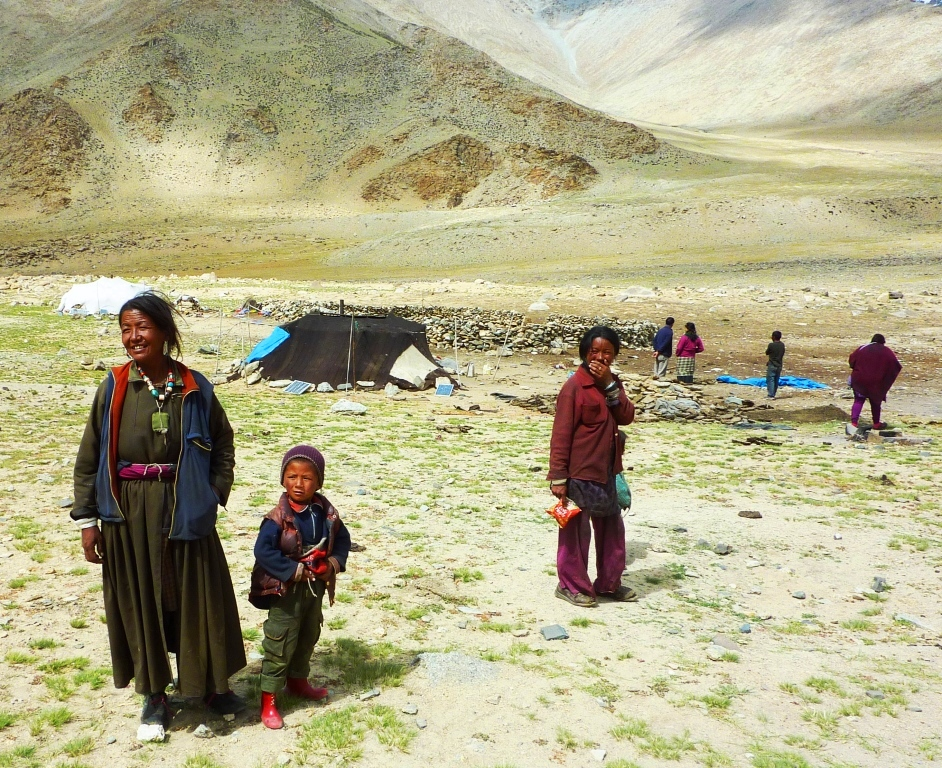
Nomads on the Changtang, Ladakh

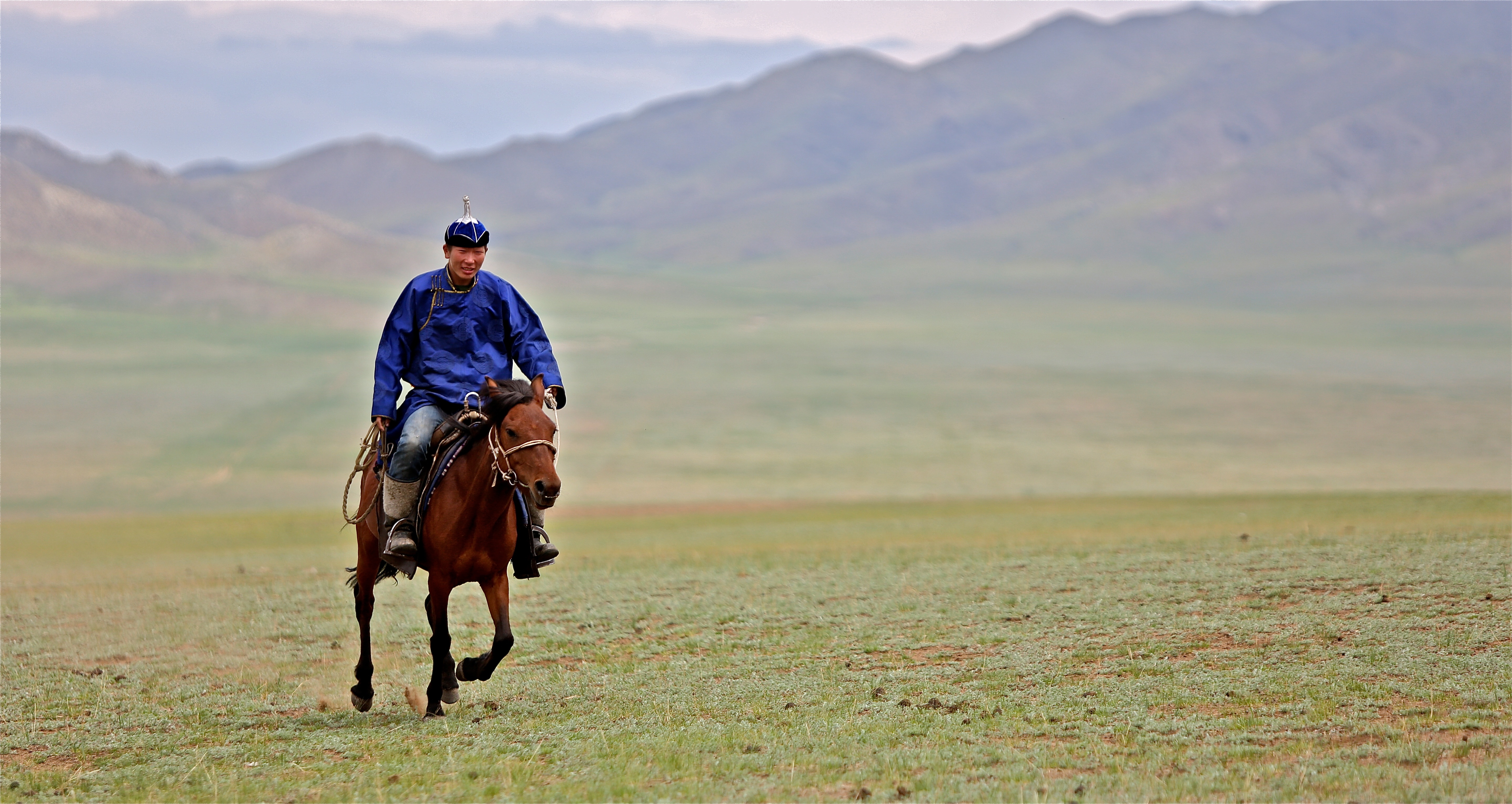
Rider in Mongolia, 2012. While nomadic life is less common in modern times, the horse remains a national symbol in Mongolia.

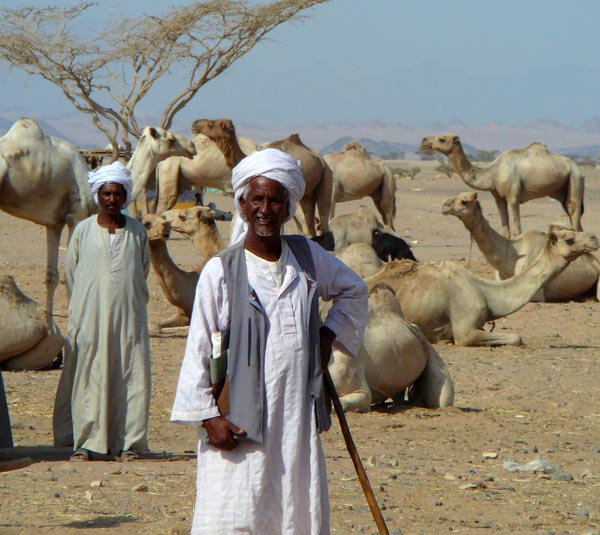
Beja nomads from Northeast Africa

Nomads are communities who move from place to place as a way of obtaining food, finding pasture for livestock, or otherwise making a living. Most nomadic groups follow a fixed annual or seasonal pattern of movements and settlements. Nomadic people traditionally travel by animal, canoe, sleigh, or on foot. Animals include camels, horses, dogs, and alpaca. Today, some nomads travel by motor vehicle. Some nomads may live in homes or homeless shelters, though this would necessarily be on a temporary or itinerant basis.

Nomads keep moving for different reasons. Nomadic foragers move in search of game, edible plants, and water. Aboriginal Australians, Negritos of Southeast Asia, and San of Africa, for example, traditionally move from camp to camp to hunt and gather wild plants. Some tribes of the Americas followed this way of life. Pastoral nomads, on the other hand, make their living raising livestock such as camels, cattle, goats, horses, sheep, or yaks; these nomads usually travel in search of pastures for their flocks. The Fulani and their cattle travel through the grasslands of Niger in western Africa. Some nomadic peoples, especially herders, may also move to raid settled communities or to avoid enemies. Nomadic craftworkers and merchants travel to find and serve customers. They include the Gadia Lohar blacksmiths of India, the Roma traders, Scottish travellers and Irish travellers.

Many nomadic and pastorally nomadic peoples are associated with semi-arid and desert climates; examples include the Mongolic and Turkic peoples of Central Asia, the Plains Indians of the Great Plains, and the Amazigh and other peoples of the Sahara Desert. Pastoral nomads who are residents of arid climates include the Fulani of the Sahel, the Khoikhoi of South Africa and Namibia, groups of Northeast Africa such as Somalis and Oromo, and the Bedouin of the Middle East.

Most nomads travel in groups of families, bands, or tribes. These groups are based on kinship and marriage ties or on formal agreements of cooperation. A council of adult males makes most of the decisions, though some tribes have chiefs.

In the case of Mongolian nomads, a family moves twice a year. These two movements generally occur during the summer and winter. The winter destination is usually located near the mountains in a valley and most families already have fixed winter locations. Their winter locations have shelter for animals and are not used by other families while they are out. In the summer they move to a more open area in which the animals can graze. Most nomads usually move within the same region and do not travel very far. Since they usually circle around a large area, communities form and families generally know where the other ones are. Often, families do not have the resources to move from one province to another unless they are moving out of the area permanently. A family can move on its own or with others; if it moves alone, they are usually no more than a couple of kilometres from each other. The geographical closeness of families is usually for mutual support. Pastoral nomad societies usually do not have large populations.

One nomadic society, the Mongols, gave rise to the largest land empire in history. The Mongols originally consisted of loosely organized nomadic tribes in Mongolia, Manchuria, and Siberia. In the late 12th century, Genghis Khan united them and other nomadic tribes to found the Mongol Empire, which eventually stretched the length of Asia.

The nomadic way of life has become increasingly rare. Many countries have converted pastures into cropland and forced nomadic peoples into permanent settlements.

Modern forms of nomadic peoples are variously referred to as "shiftless", "gypsies", "rootless cosmopolitans", hunter-gatherers, refugees and urban homeless or street-people, depending on their individual circumstances. These terms may be used in a derogatory sense.

According to Gérard Chaliand, terrorism originated in nomad-warrior cultures. He points to Machiavelli's classification of war into two types, which Chaliand interprets as describing a difference between warfare in sedentary and nomadic societies:

There are two different kinds of war. The one springs from the ambition of princes or republics that seek to extend their empire; such were the wars of Alexander the Great, and those of the Romans, and those which two hostile powers carry on against each other. These wars are dangerous but never go so far as to drive all its inhabitants out of a province, because the conqueror is satisfied with the submission of the people... The other kind of war is when an entire people, constrained by famine or war, leave their country with their families for the purpose of seeking a new home in a new country, not for the purpose of subjecting it to their dominion as in the first case, but with the intention of taking absolute possession of it themselves and driving out or killing its original inhabitants.

Primary historical sources for nomadic steppe-style warfare are found in many languages: Chinese, Persian, Polish, Russian, Classical Greek, Armenian, Latin and Arabic. These sources concern both the true steppe nomads (Mongols, Huns, Magyars and Scythians).

== Hunter-gatherers ==
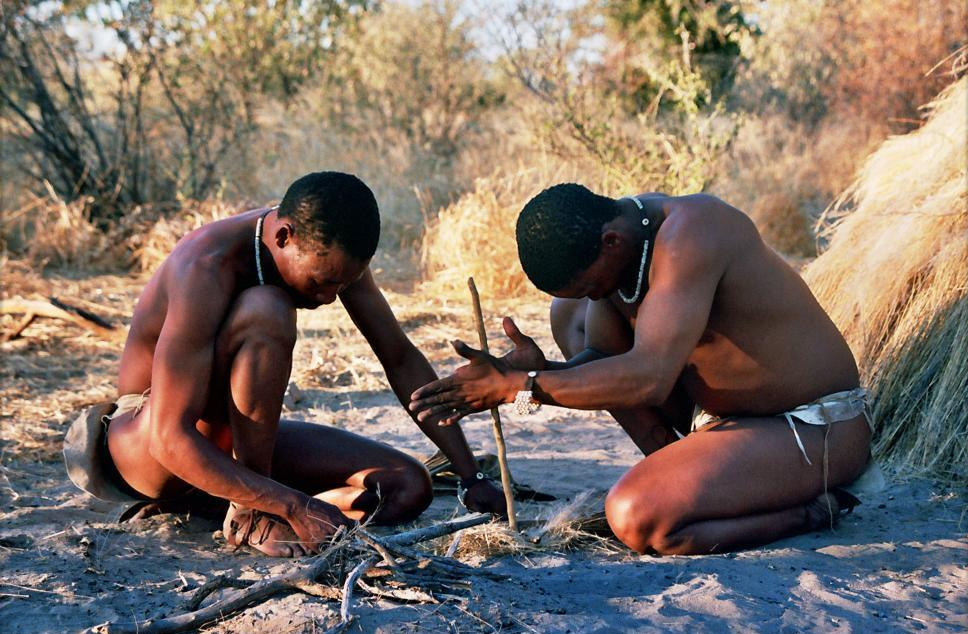
Starting fire by hand. San people in Botswana.

Hunter-gatherers (also known as foragers) move from campsite to campsite, following game and wild fruits and vegetables. Hunting and gathering describes early peoples' subsistence living style. Following the development of agriculture, most hunter-gatherers were eventually either displaced or converted to farming or pastoralist groups. Only a few contemporary societies, such as the Pygmies, the Hadza people, and some uncontacted tribes in the Amazon rainforest, are classified as hunter-gatherers; some of these societies supplement, sometimes extensively, their foraging activity with farming or animal husbandry.

== Pastoralism ==
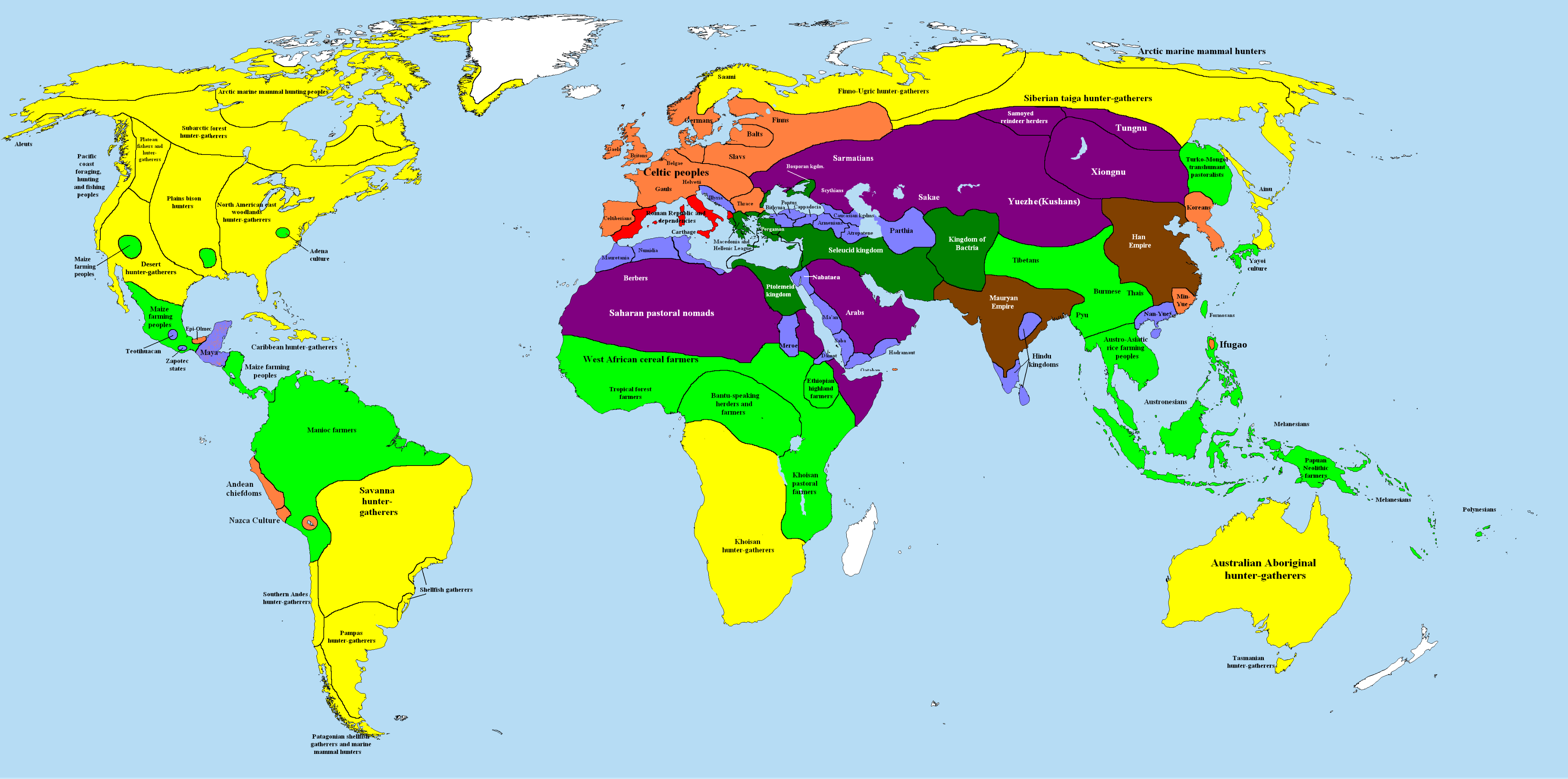
Overview map of the world in 200 BC: Sarmatians, Saka, Yuezhi, Xiongnu and other nomadic pastoralists

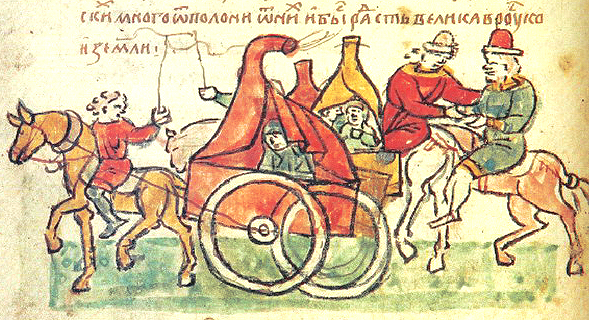
Cuman nomads, Radziwiłł Chronicle, 13th century.

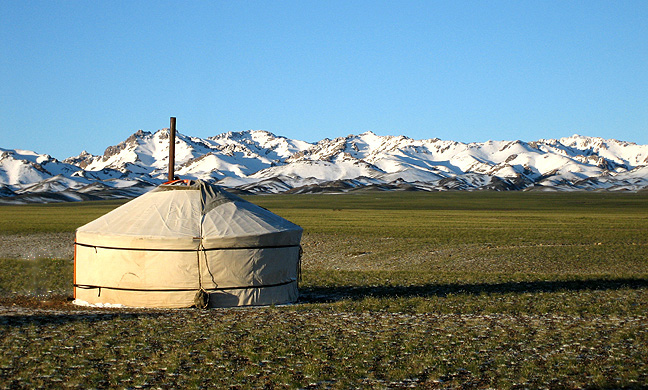
A yurt in front of the Gurvan Saikhan Mountains. Approximately 30% of Mongolia's 3 million people are nomadic or semi-nomadic.

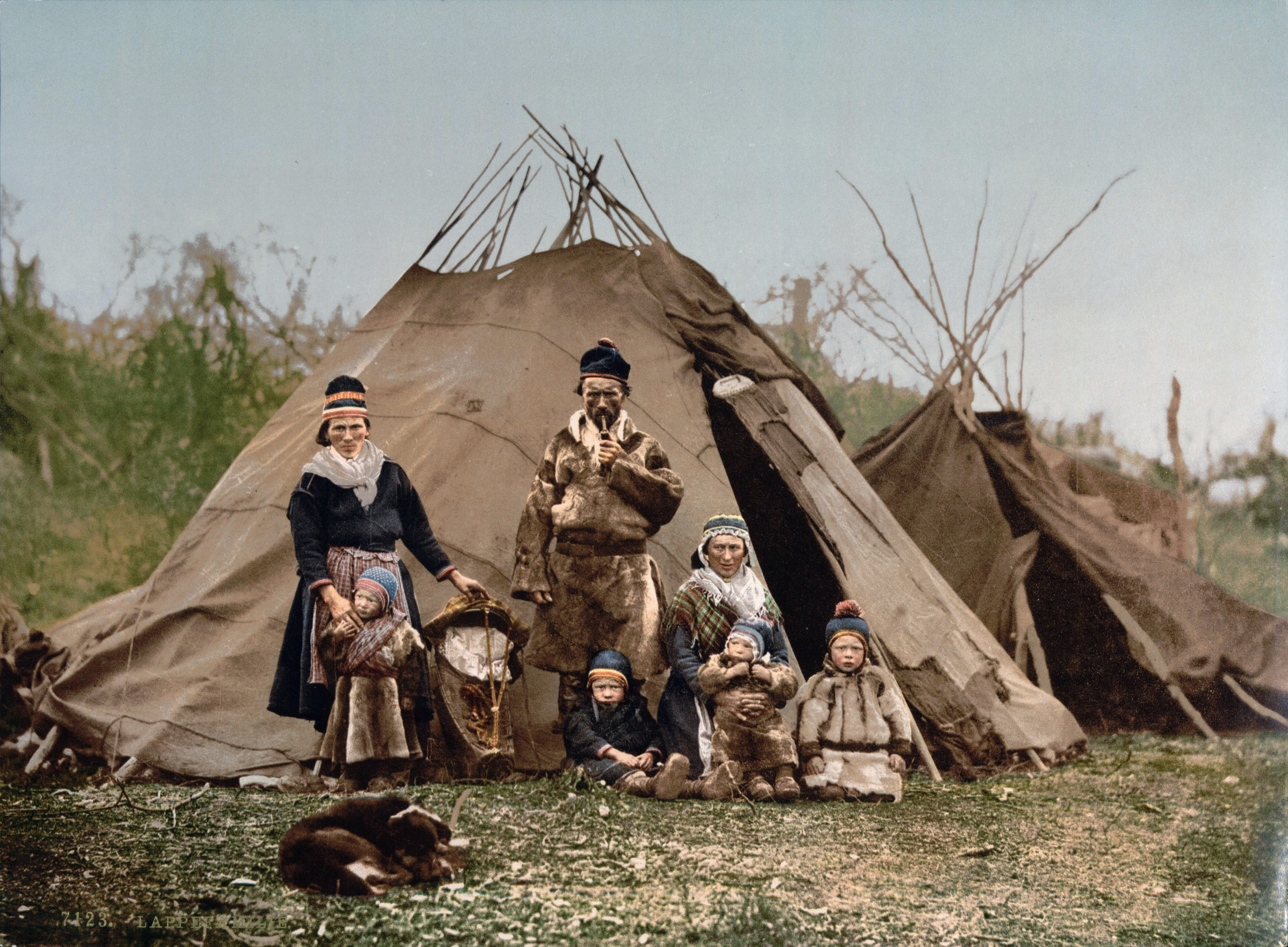
A Sámi family in Norway around 1900. Reindeer have been herded for centuries by several Arctic and Subarctic people including the Sámi and the Nenets.

Pastoral nomads are nomads moving from pastures to pastures. Nomadic pastoralism is thought to have developed in three stages that accompanied population growth and an increase in the complexity of social organization. Karim Sadr has proposed the following stages:

- Pastoralism: This is a mixed economy with a symbiosis within the family.
- Agropastoralism: This is when symbiosis is between segments or clans within an ethnic group.
- True Nomadism: This is when symbiosis is at the regional level, generally between specialised nomadic and agricultural populations.

The pastoralists are sedentary to a certain area, as they move between the permanent spring, summer, autumn and winter (or dry and wet season) pastures for their livestock. The nomads moved depending on the availability of resources.

=== History ===
==== Origins ====
Nomadic pastoralism seems to have developed first as a part of the secondary-products revolution proposed by Andrew Sherratt, in which early pre-pottery Neolithic cultures that had used animals as live meat ("on the hoof") also began using animals for their secondary products, for example: milk and its associated dairy products, wool and other animal hair, hides (and consequently leather), manure (for fuel and fertilizer), and traction.

The first nomadic pastoral society developed in the period from 8,500 to 6,500 BCE in the area of the southern Levant. There, during a period of increasing aridity, Pre-Pottery Neolithic B (PPNB) cultures in the Sinai were replaced by a nomadic, pastoral pottery-using culture, which seems to have been a cultural fusion between them and a newly-arrived Mesolithic people from Egypt (the Harifian culture), adopting their nomadic hunting lifestyle to the raising of stock.

This lifestyle quickly developed into what Jaris Yurins has called the circum-Arabian nomadic pastoral techno-complex and is possibly associated with the appearance of Semitic languages in the region of the Ancient Near East. The rapid spread of such nomadic pastoralism was typical of such later developments as of the Yamnaya culture of the horse and cattle nomads of the Eurasian steppe (c. 3300–2600 BCE), and of the Mongol spread in the later Middle Ages.

Yamnaya steppe pastoralists from the Pontic–Caspian steppe, who were among the first to master horseback riding, played a key role in Indo-European migrations and in the spread of Indo-European languages across Eurasia.

Trekboers in southern Africa adopted nomadism from the 17th century. Some elements of gaucho culture in colonial South America also re-invented nomadic lifestyles.

==== Increase in post-Soviet Central Asia ====
One of the results of the break-up of the Soviet Union and the subsequent political independence and economic collapse of its Central Asian republics has been the resurgence of pastoral nomadism. Taking the Kyrgyz people as a representative example, nomadism was the centre of their economy before Russian colonization at the turn of the 20th century, when they were settled into agricultural villages. The population became increasingly urbanized after World War II, but some people still take their herds of horses and cows to high pastures (jailoo) every summer, continuing a pattern of transhumance.

Since the 1990s, as the cash economy shrank, unemployed relatives were reabsorbed into family farms, and the importance of this form of nomadism has increased. The symbols of nomadism, specifically the crown of the grey felt tent known as the yurt, appears on the national flag, emphasizing the central importance of nomadism in the genesis of the modern nation of Kyrgyzstan.

==== Sedentarization ====
From 1920 to 2008, the population of nomadic pastoral tribes slowly decreased from over a quarter of Iran's population. Tribal pastures were nationalized during the 1960s. The National Commission of UNESCO registered the population of Iran at 21 million in 1963, of whom two million (9.5%) were nomads. Although the nomadic population of Iran has dramatically decreased in the 20th century, Iran still has one of the largest nomadic populations in the world, an estimated 1.5 million in a country of about 70 million.

In Kazakhstan where the major agricultural activity was nomadic herding, forced collectivization under Joseph Stalin's rule met with massive resistance and major losses and confiscation of livestock. Livestock in Kazakhstan fell from 7 million cattle to 1.6 million and from 22 million sheep to 1.7 million. The resulting famine of 1931–1934 caused some 1.5 million deaths: this represents more than 40% of the total Kazakh population at that time.

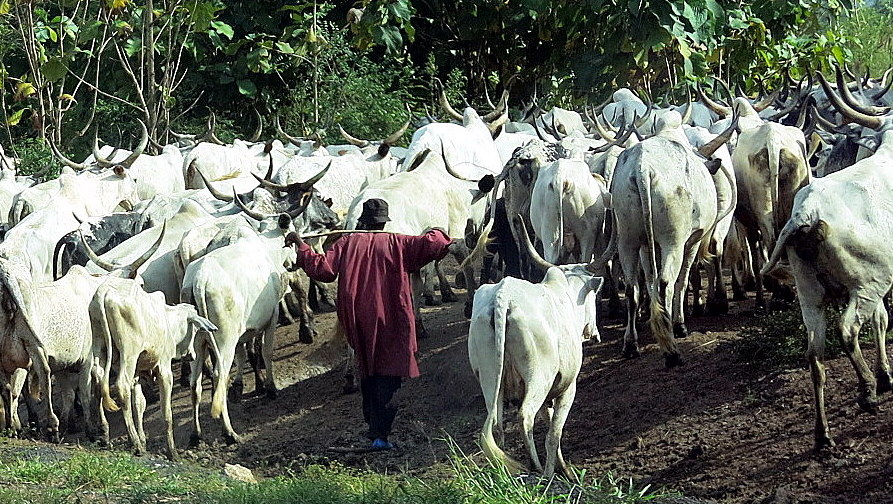
Fulani herdsman in Togo. Spread throughout West Africa, the Fulani are the largest nomadic group in the world.

In the 1950s as well as the 1960s, large numbers of Bedouin throughout the Middle East started to leave the traditional, nomadic life to settle in the cities of the Middle East, especially as home ranges have shrunk and population levels have grown. Government policies in Egypt and Israel, oil production in Libya and the Persian Gulf, as well as a desire for improved standards of living, effectively led most Bedouin to become settled citizens of various nations, rather than stateless nomadic herders. A century ago, nomadic Bedouin still made up some 10% of the total Arab population. Today, they account for some 1% of the total.

At independence in 1960, Mauritania was essentially a nomadic society. The great Sahel droughts of the early 1970s caused massive problems in a country where 85% of its inhabitants were nomadic herders. Today only 15% remain nomads.

In Ireland, historically Irish Travellers families practiced seasonal nomadism, with 92% residing in tents or horse-drawn wagons as recent as 1960, often traveling in dispersed, small groups between March and November. Rapid modernization and laws targeting the "itinerant problem" saw this lifestyle decline to 27% by 1971 and 4% by 1981, with most families transitioning to urban, sedentary housing. Current housing, as of today includes roadside/vacant lots (40%), public housing (36%), and government-provided sites (25%).

As many as 2 million nomadic Kuchis wandered over Afghanistan in the years before the Soviet invasion, and most experts agreed that by 2000 the number had fallen dramatically, perhaps by half. A severe drought had destroyed 80% of the livestock in some areas.

Niger experienced a serious food crisis in 2005 following erratic rainfall and desert locust invasions. Nomads such as the Tuareg and Fulani, who make up about 20% of Niger's 12.9 million population, had been so badly hit by the Niger food crisis that their already fragile way of life is at risk. Nomads in Mali were also affected. The Fulani of West Africa are the world's largest nomadic group.

=== Lifestyle ===
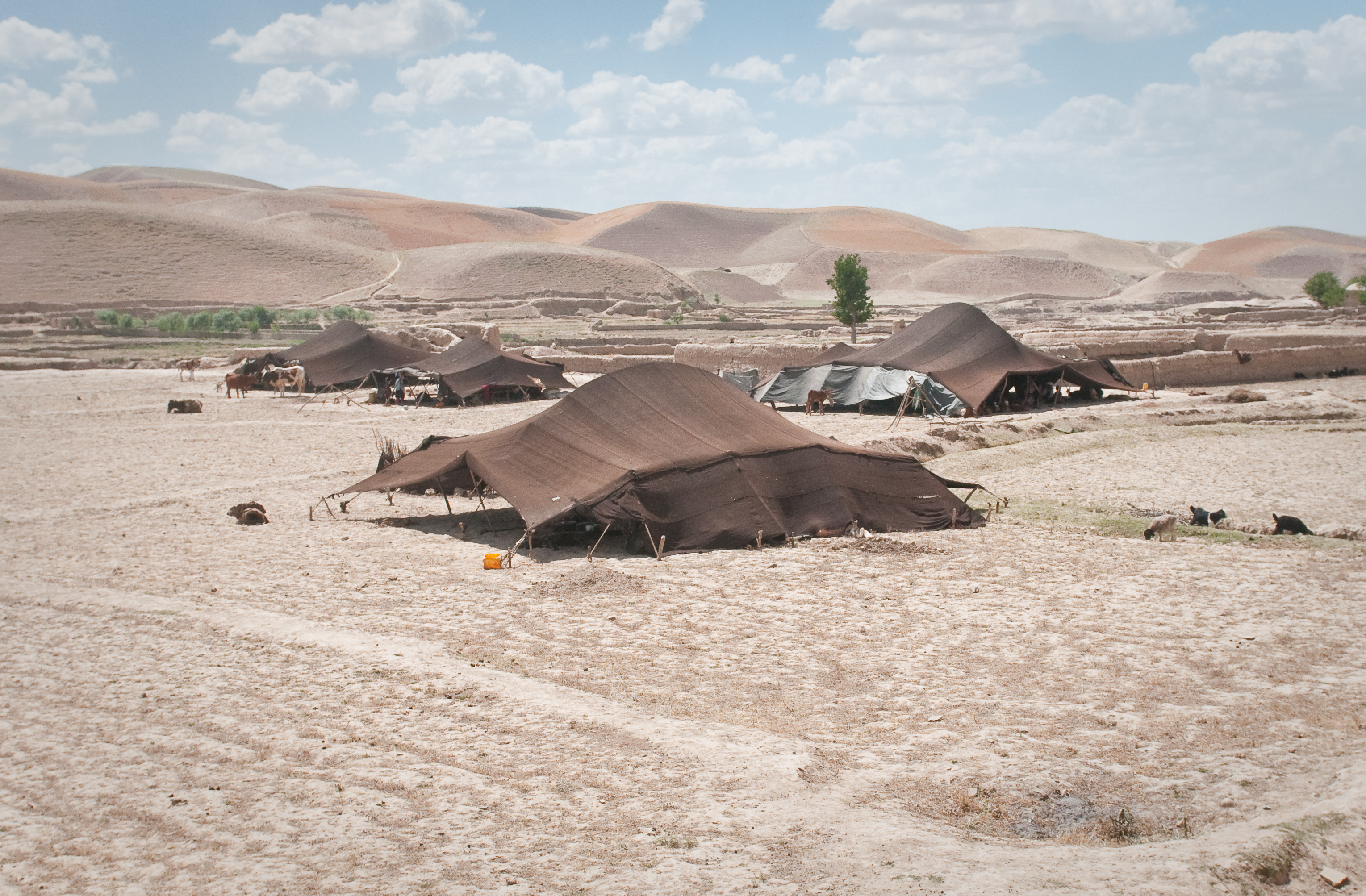
Tents of Pashtun nomads in Badghis Province, Afghanistan. They migrate from region to region depending on the season.

Pala nomads living in Western Tibet have a diet that is unusual in that they consume very few vegetables and no fruit. The main staple of their diet is tsampa and they drink Tibetan style butter tea. Pala will eat heartier foods in the winter months to help keep warm. Some of the customary restrictions they explain as cultural saying only that drokha do not eat certain foods, even some that may be naturally abundant. Though they live near sources of fish and fowl these do not play a significant role in their diet, and they do not eat carnivorous animals, rabbits or the wild asses that are abundant in the environs, classifying the latter as horse due to their cloven hooves. Some families do not eat until after the morning milking, while others may have a light meal with butter tea and tsampa. In the afternoon, after the morning milking, the families gather and share a communal meal of tea, tsampa and sometimes yogurt. During winter months the meal is more substantial and includes meat. Herders will eat before leaving the camp and most do not eat again until they return to camp for the evening meal. The typical evening meal may include thin stew with tsampa, animal fat and dried radish. Winter stew would include a lot of meat with either tsampa or boiled flour dumplings.

Nomadic diets in Kazakhstan have not changed much over centuries. The Kazakh nomad cuisine is simple and includes meat, salads, marinated vegetables and fried and baked breads. Tea is served in bowls, possibly with sugar or milk. Milk and other dairy products, like cheese and yogurt, are especially important. Kumys is a drink of fermented milk. Wrestling is a popular sport, but the nomadic people do not have much time for leisure. Horse riding is a valued skill in their culture.

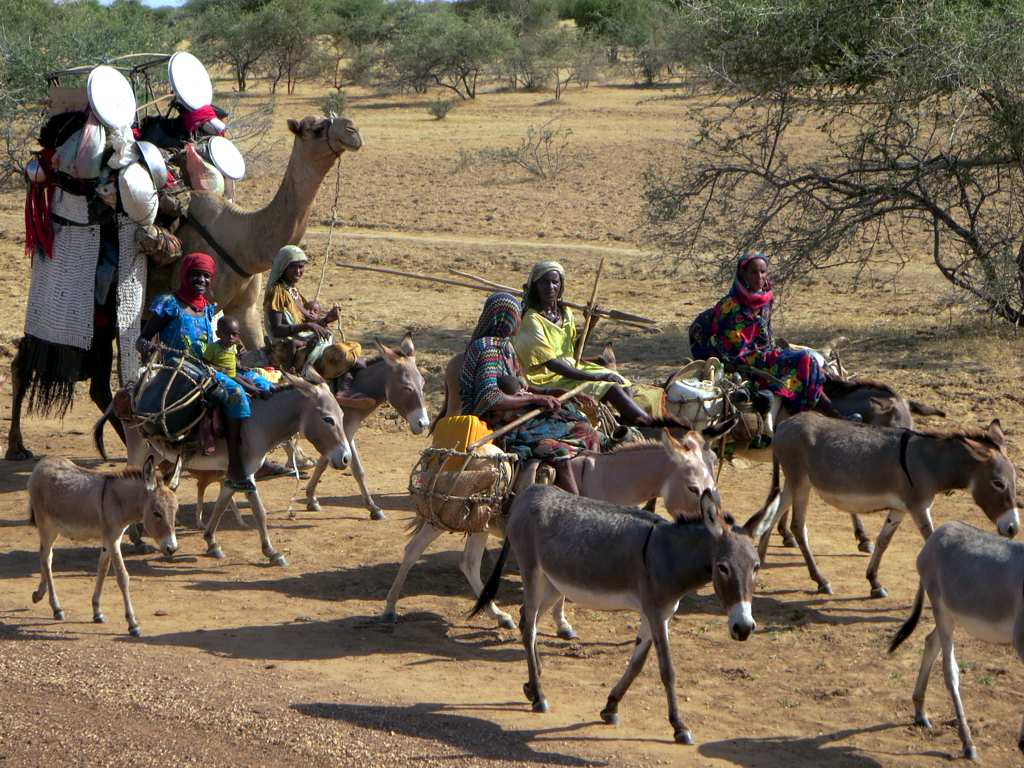
Movement of nomads in Chad

=== Perception ===
Ann Marie Kroll Lerner states that the pastoral nomads were viewed as "invading, destructive, and altogether antithetical to civilizing, sedentary societies" during the late-19th and early-20th centuries. According to Lerner, they are rarely accredited as "a civilizing force".

Allan Hill and Sara Randall observe that western authors have looked for "romance and mystery, as well as the repository of laudable characteristics believed lost in the West, such as independence, stoicism in the face of physical adversity, and a strong sense of loyalty to family and to tribe" in nomadic pastoralist societies. Hill and Randall observe that nomadic pastoralists are stereotypically seen by the settled populace in Africa and Middle East as "aimless wanderers, immoral, promiscuous and disease-ridden" peoples. According to Hill and Randall, both of these perceptions "misrepresent the reality".

The development of "nomadology" by Deleuze and Guattari emphasises a positive view of features of nomadism.

== Contemporary peripatetic minorities in Eurasia ==
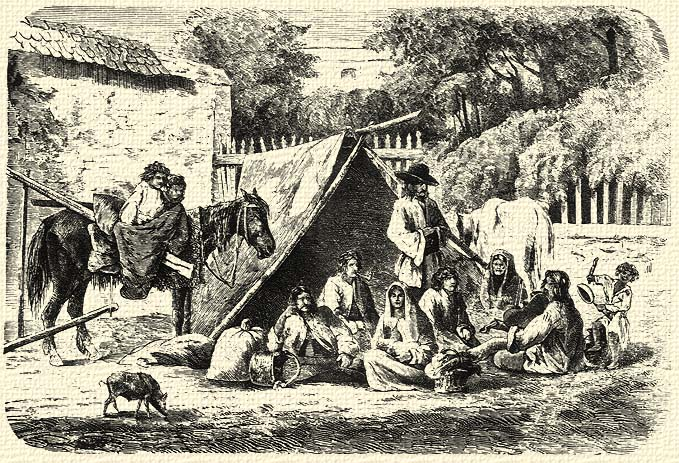
A tent of Romani nomads in Hungary, 19th century.

Peripatetic minorities are mobile populations moving among settled populations offering a craft or trade.

Each existing community is primarily endogamous, and subsists traditionally on a variety of commercial or service activities. Formerly, all or a majority of their members were itinerant, and this largely holds true today. Migration generally takes place within the political boundaries of a single state these days.

Each of the peripatetic communities is multilingual, it speaks one or more of the languages spoken by the local sedentary populations, and, additionally, within each group, a separate dialect or language is spoken. They are speaking languages of Indic origin and many are structured somewhat like an argot or secret language, with vocabularies drawn from various languages. There are indications that in northern Iran at least one community speaks Romani language, and some groups in Turkey also speak Romani.

=== Asia ===
==== India ====
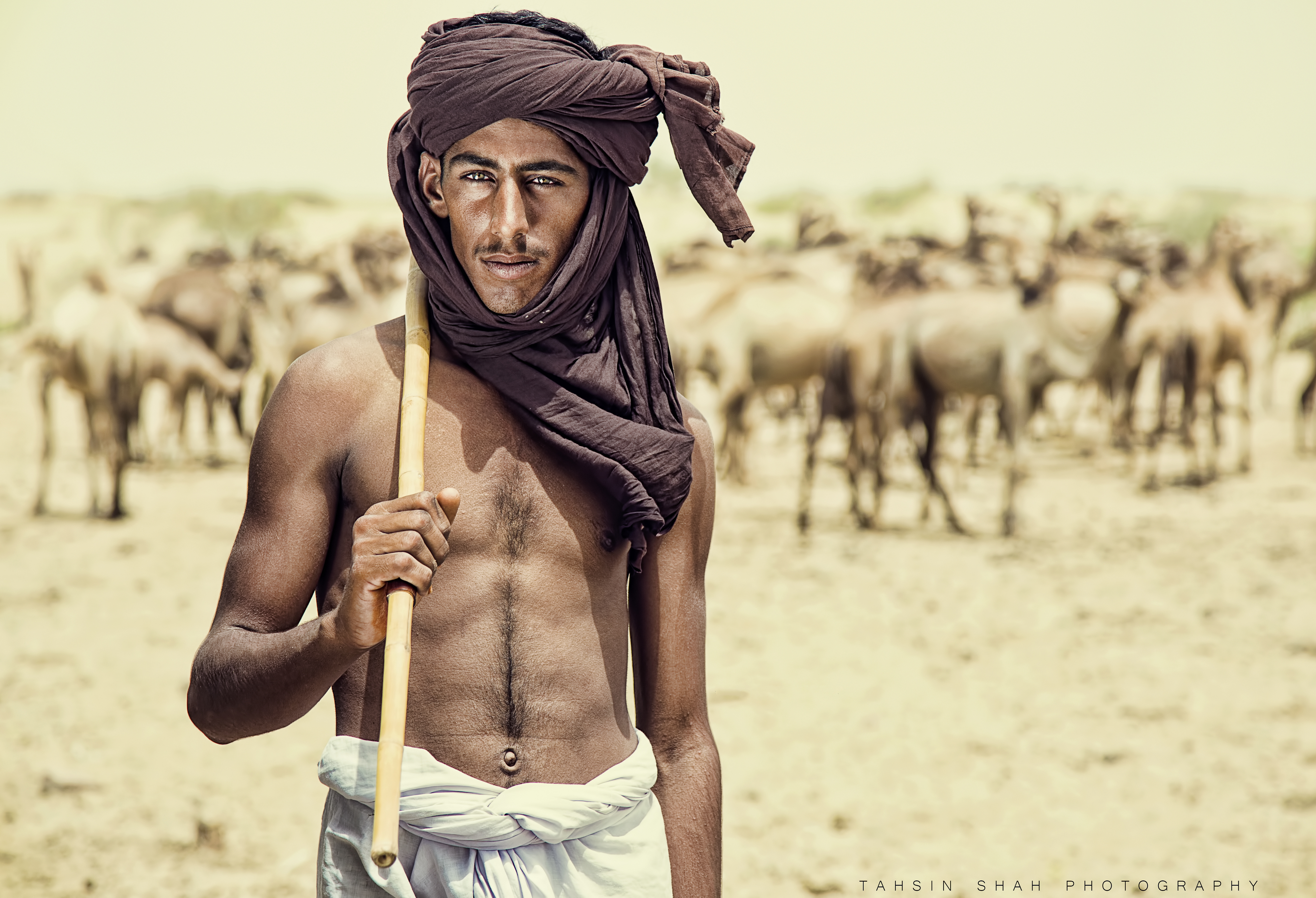
Camel grazers in the Thar Desert

==== Dom people ====
In Afghanistan, the Nausar worked as tinkers and animal dealers. Ghorbat men mainly made sieves, drums, and bird cages, and the women peddled these as well as other items of household and personal use; they also worked as moneylenders to rural women. Peddling and the sale of various goods was also practiced by men and women of various groups, such as the Jalali, the Pikraj, the Shadibaz, the Noristani, and the Vangawala. The latter and the Pikraj also worked as animal dealers. Some men among the Shadibaz and the Vangawala entertained as monkey or bear handlers and snake charmers; men and women among the Baluch were musicians and dancers. The Baluch men were warriors that were feared by neighboring tribes and often were used as mercenaries. Jogi men and women had diverse subsistence activities, such as dealing in horses, harvesting, fortune-telling, bloodletting, and begging.

In Iran, the Asheq of Azerbaijan, the Challi of Baluchistan, the Luti of Kurdistan, Kermānshāh, Īlām, and Lorestān, the Mehtar in the Mamasani district, the Sazandeh of Band-i Amir and Marv-dasht, and the Toshmal among the Bakhtyari pastoral groups worked as professional musicians. The men among the Kowli worked as tinkers, smiths, musicians, and monkey and bear handlers; they also made baskets, sieves, and brooms and dealt in donkeys. Their women made a living from peddling, begging, and fortune-telling.

The Ghorbat among the Basseri were smiths and tinkers, traded in pack animals, and made sieves, reed mats, and small wooden implements. In the Fārs region, the Qarbalband, the Kuli, and Luli were reported to work as smiths and to make baskets and sieves; they also dealt in pack animals, and their women peddled various goods among pastoral nomads. In the same region, the Changi and Luti were musicians and balladeers, and their children learned these professions from the age of 7 or 8 years.

The nomadic groups in Turkey make and sell cradles, deal in animals, and play music. The men of the sedentary groups work in towns as scavengers and hangmen; elsewhere they are fishermen, smiths, basket makers, and singers; their women dance at feasts and tell fortunes. Abdal men played music and made sieves, brooms, and wooden spoons for a living. The Tahtacı traditionally worked as lumberers; with increased sedentarization, however, they have taken to agriculture and horticulture.

Little is known for certain about the past of these communities; the history of each is almost entirely contained in their oral traditions. Although some groups—such as the Vangawala—are of Indian origin, some—like the Noristani—are most probably of local origin; still others probably migrated from adjoining areas. The Ghorbat and the Shadibaz claim to have originally come from Iran and Multan, respectively, and Tahtacı traditional accounts mention either Baghdad or Khorāsān as their original home. The Baluch say they were attached as a service community to the Jamshedi, after they fled Baluchistan because of feuds.

==== Yörüks ====
Still some groups such as Sarıkeçililer continues nomadic lifestyle between coastal towns Mediterranean and Taurus Mountains even though most of them were settled by both late Ottoman and Turkish republic.

==== Bukat people ====
The Bukat people of Borneo in Malaysia live within the region of the river Mendalam, which the natives call Buköt. Bukat is an ethnonym that encapsulates all the tribes in the region. These natives are historically self-sufficient but were also known to trade various goods. This is especially true for the clans who lived on the periphery of the territory. The products of their trade were varied and fascinating, including: "...resins (damar, Agathis dammara; jelutong bukit, Dyera costulata, gutta-percha, Palaquium spp.); wild honey and beeswax (important in trade but often unreported); aromatic resin from insence wood (gaharu, Aquilaria microcarpa); camphor (found in the fissures of Dryobalanops aromaticus); several types of rotan of cane (Calamus rotan and other species); poison for blowpipe darts (one source is ipoh or ipu: see Nieuwenhuis 1900a:137); the antlers of deer (the sambar, Cervus unicolor); rhinoceros horn (see Tillema 1939:142); pharmacologically valuable bezoar stones (concretions formed in the intestines and gallbladder of the gibbon, Seminopithecus, and in the wounds of porcupines, Hestrix crassispinus); birds' nests, the edible nests of swifts (Collocalia spp.); the heads and feathers of two species of hornbills (Buceros rhinoceros, Rhinoplax vigil); and various hides (clouded leopards, bears, and other animals)." These nomadic tribes also commonly hunted boar with poison blow darts for their own needs.

== Image gallery ==
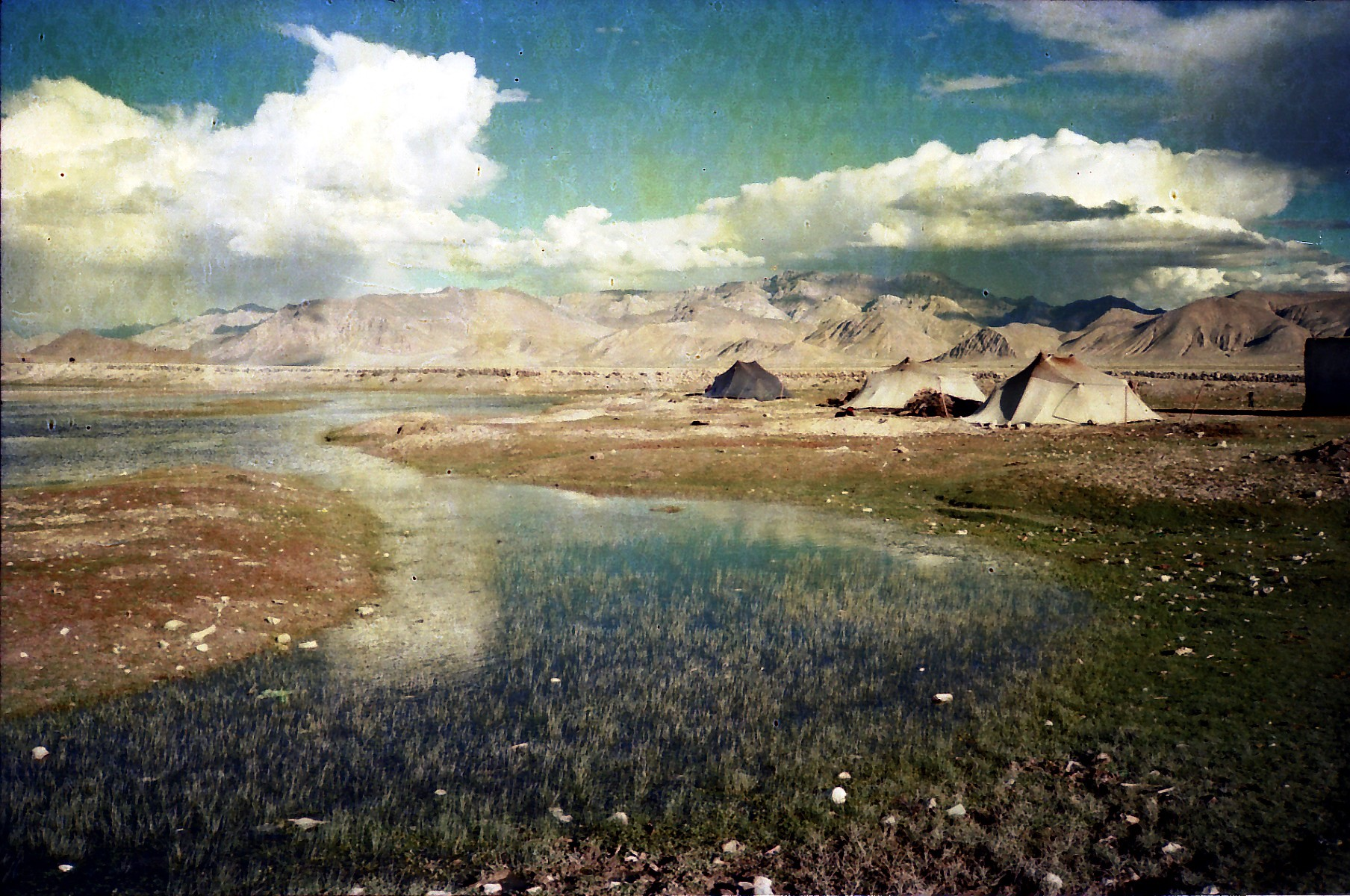
Nomad camp near Tingri, Tibet. 1993

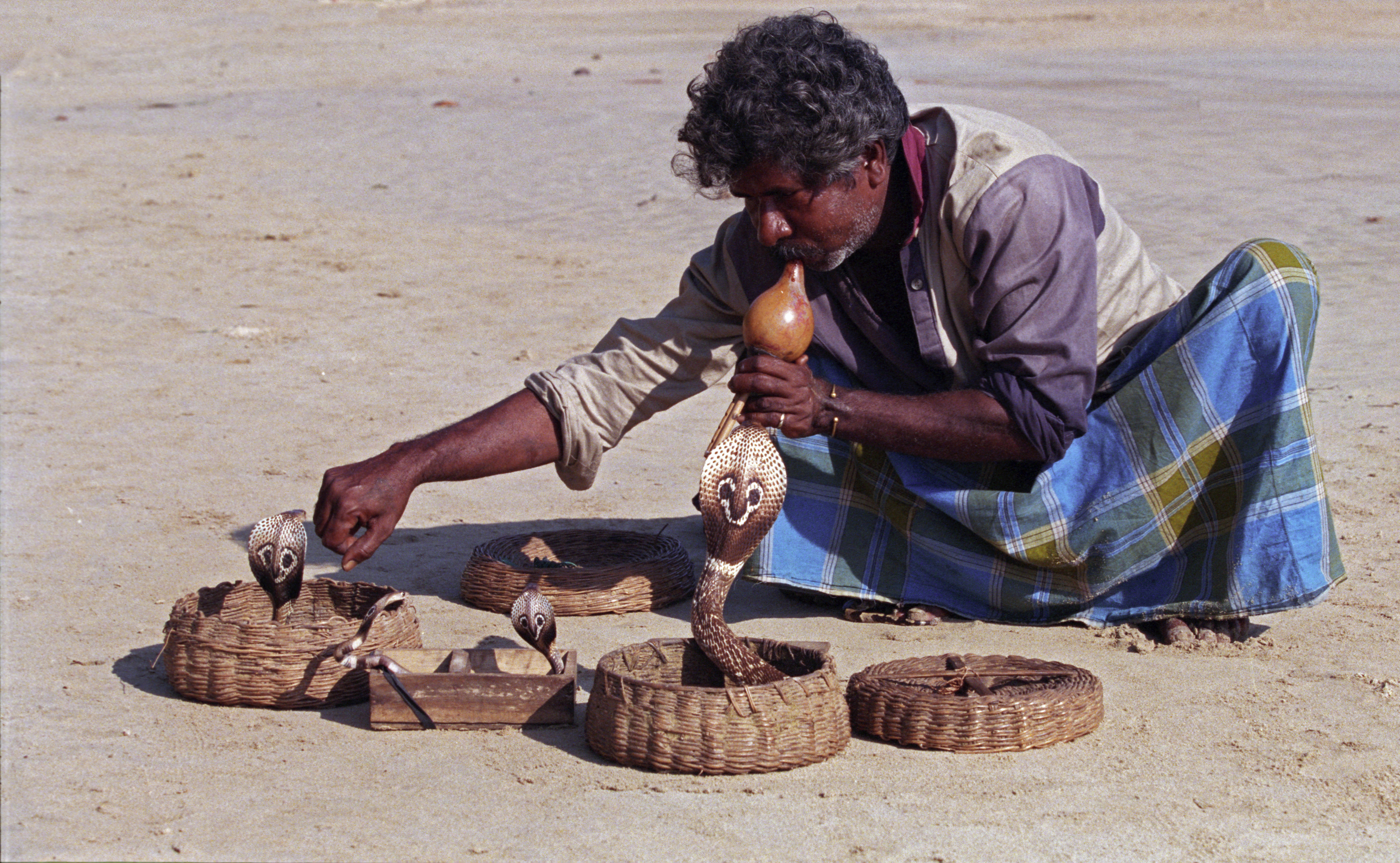
Snake charmer from Telugu community of Sri Lanka.

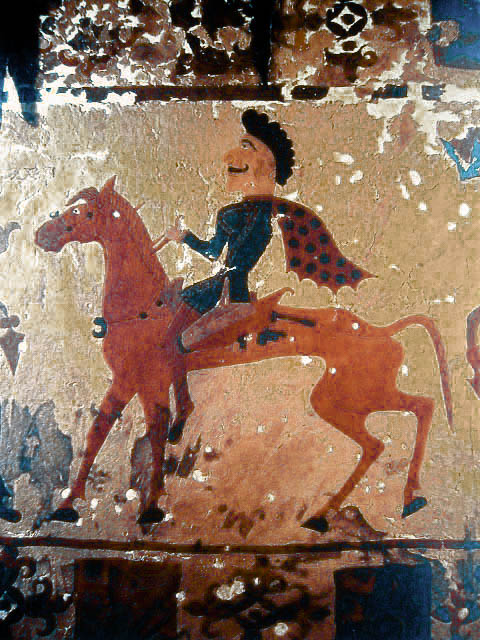
A Scythian horseman from the general area of the Ili river, Pazyryk, c. 300 BCE.

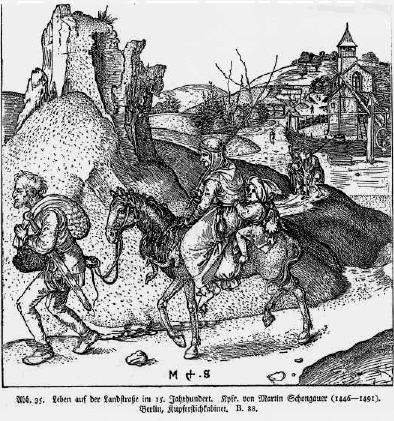
Yeniche people, 15th century

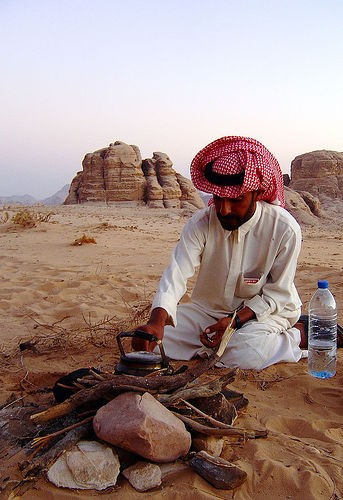
A young Bedouin lighting a camp fire in Wadi Rum, Jordan.

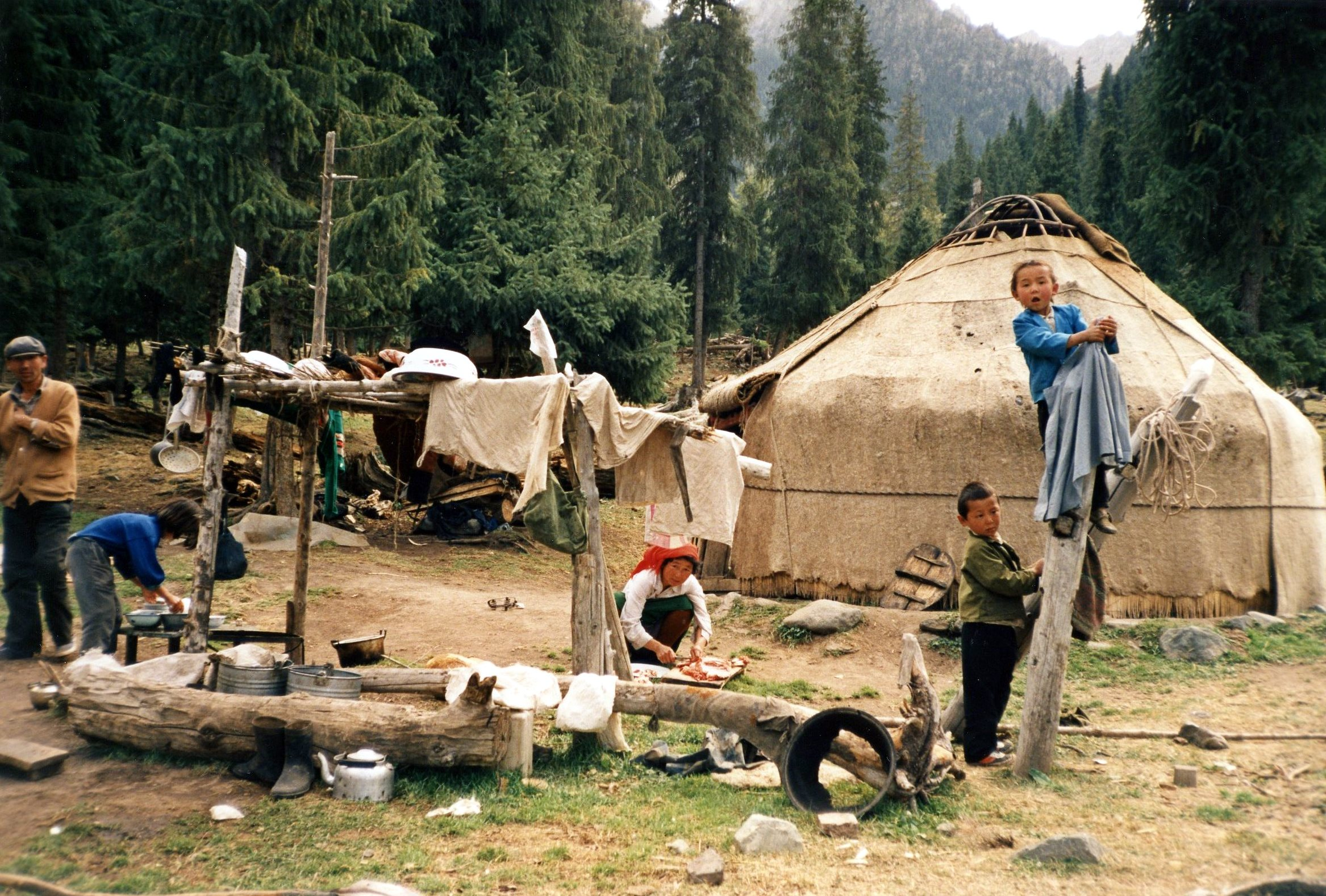
Kazakhs in Xinjiang, China, 1987

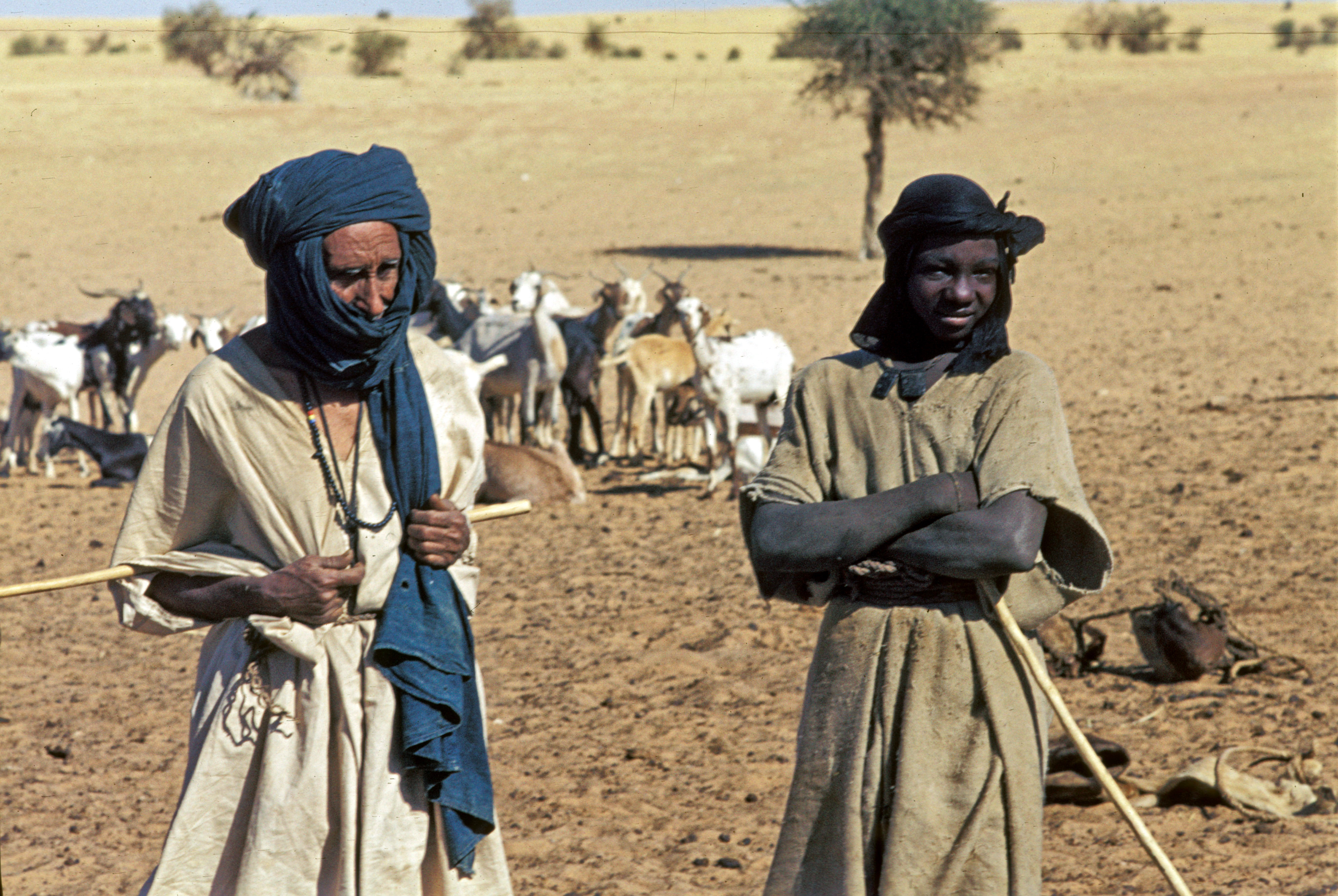
Tuareg in Mali, 1974.

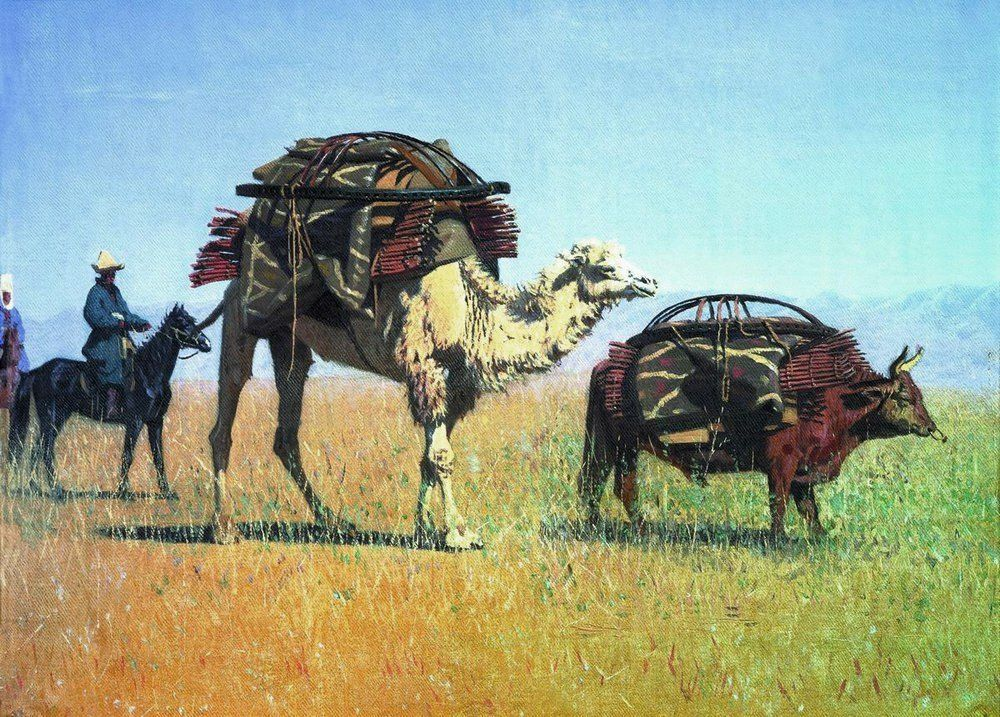
Kyrgyz nomads, 1869–1870.

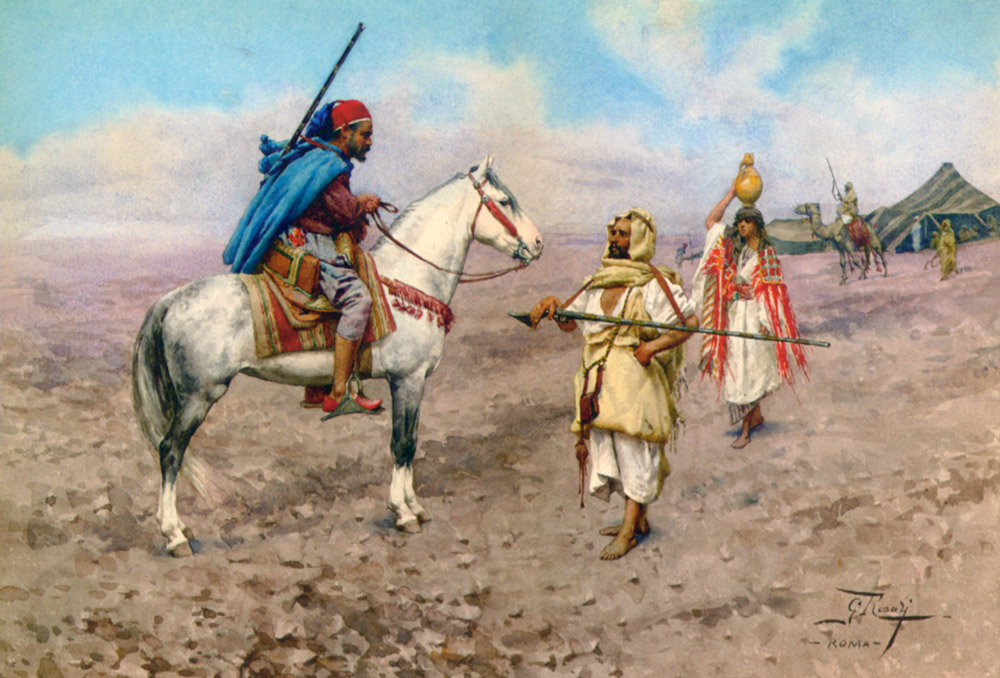
Nomads in the Desert (Giulio Rosati).

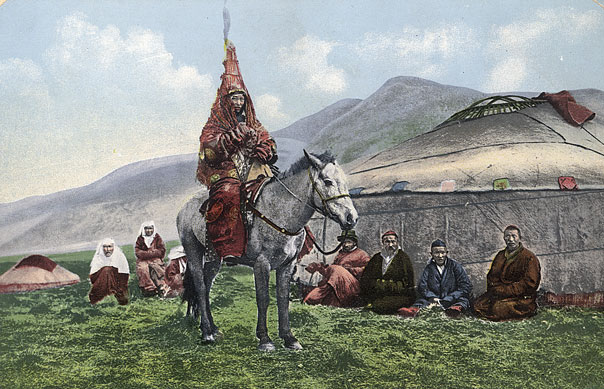
Kazakhs, c. 1910

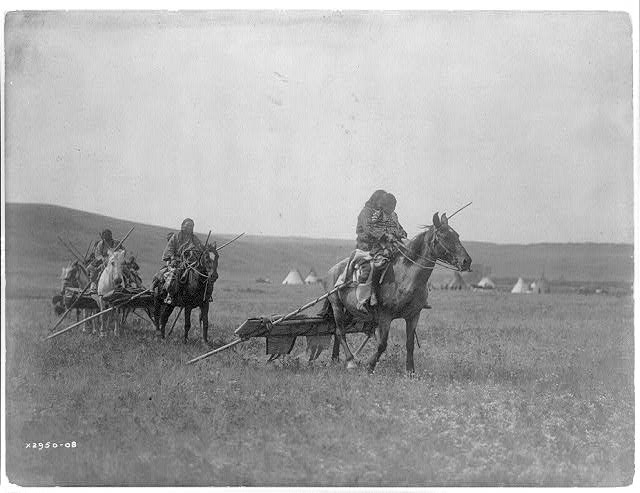
Gros Ventre (Atsina) American Indians moving camps with travois for transporting skin lodges and belongings.

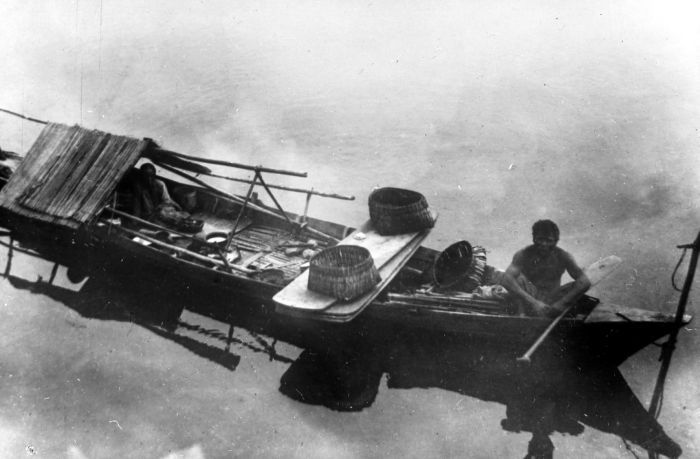
House barge of the Sama-Bajau peoples, Indonesia. 1914–1921

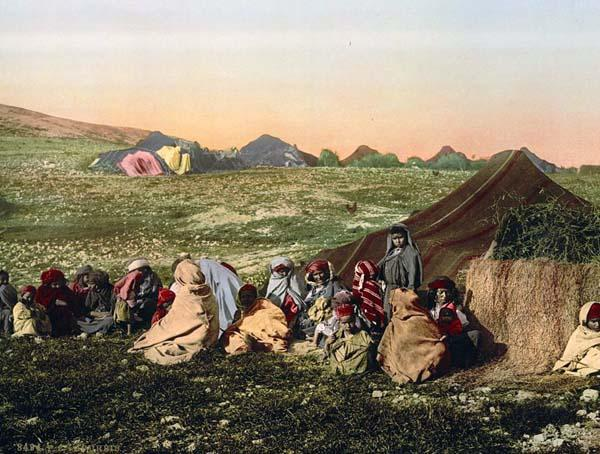
Photograph of Bedouins of Tunisia, 1899

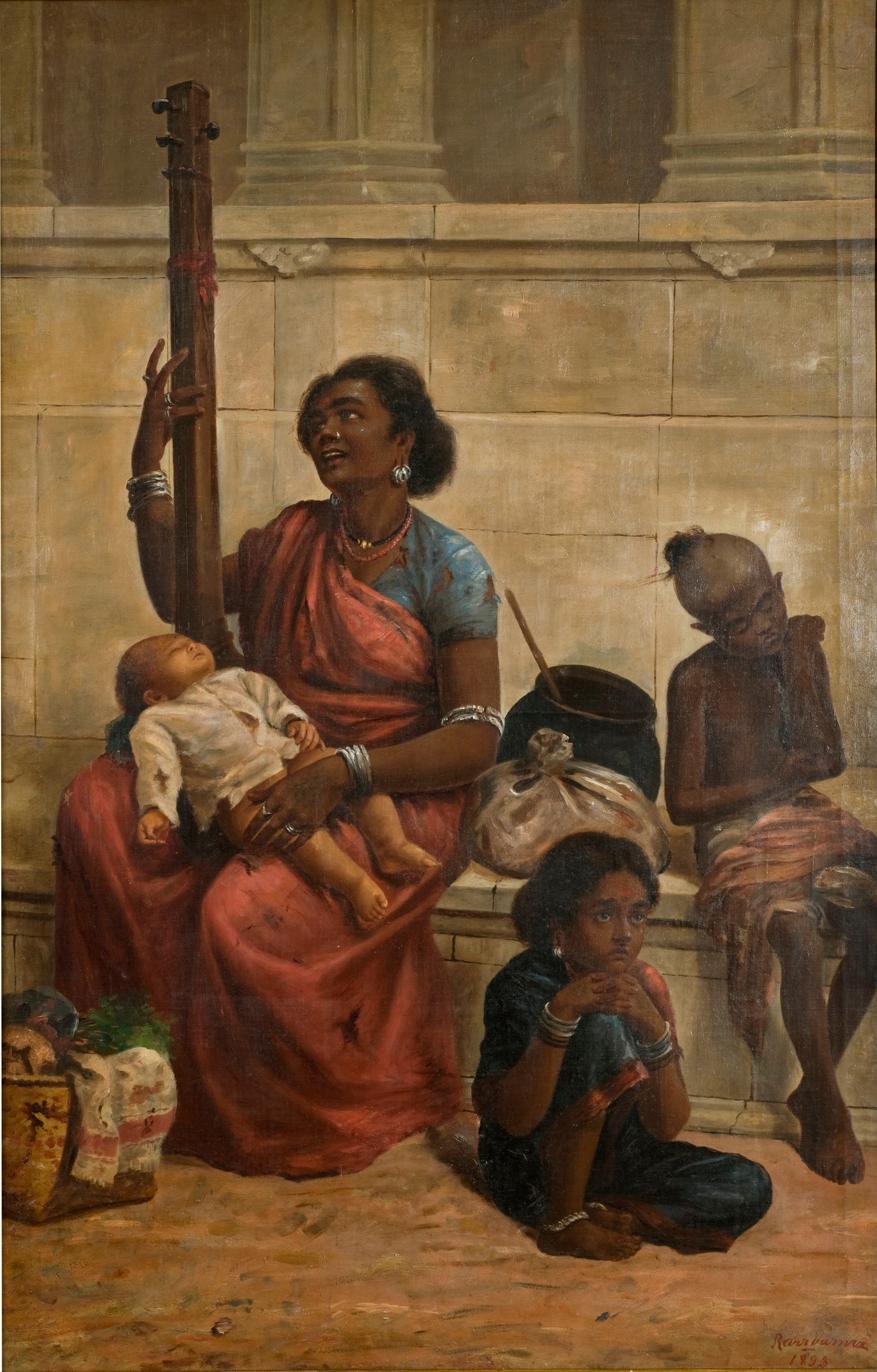
Indian nomads (1893), by Raja Ravi Varma

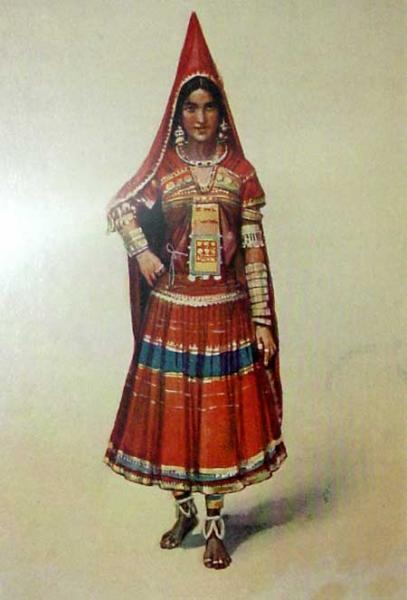
Indian nomad Banjara

== See also ==
- Nomadic peoples of Europe
- Karapapakhs
- Shahsevan
- Seasonal human migration
- Nomadic conflict
- Nomadology
- Sea Gypsies
- Pastoral society
- Pastoralism
- Transhumance

Figurative use of the term:

- Global nomad
- Digital nomad
- Snowbird (people)
- Military brat
- The Nomadic Project
- Perpetual traveler
- RV lifestyle
- Third culture kid
- Overlanding
