= Allan C. Hill =

Allan C. Hill (September 23, 1948 in Norfolk, Virginia – September 10, 2007 in Sarasota, Florida) was an American Entrepreneur and Circus owner who founded the Great American Circus.

In 1992, Hills' company successfully bounced back from tragedy when an elephant stampeded out of control and had to be euthanized by police officers.
