= Allan Hills, Saskatchewan =

Community in Saskatchewan, Canada

- unincorporated community
- Location within Saskatchewan
- Coordinates: 51.386°N 106.045°W
- Country: Canada
- Province: Saskatchewan
- Region: South-west Saskatchewan
- Census division: 4
- Rural Municipality: Lost River
- Established: 1919

Government
  - Governing body: Lost River No. 313

Area
  - Total: 0.00 km^{2} (0 sq mi)

Population (2001)
  - Total: 0
  - Density: 0/km^{2} (0/sq mi)
- Time zone: CST
- Postal code: S0N 2G0
- Area code: 306
- Highways: Highway 764

Allan Hills is an unincorporated community in Lost River Rural Municipality No. 313, Saskatchewan, Canada. The community is located on Highway 764, 12 km south of the town of Allan in the heart of the Allan Hills.

== History ==
The Allan Hills Post office was located at Sec 22 Twp 31 R1 W3 from July 1, 1919, to closing on Dec 31, 1951. Another post office was open for a short time from August 1, 1914, to April 1, 1918, on Sec 15 in the same Township.

== See also ==
- List of communities in Saskatchewan
