= Rural Municipality of Lost River No. 313 =

Rural municipality in Saskatchewan, Canada

Lost River No. 313
- Rural municipality
- Rural Municipality of Lost River No. 313
- Location of the RM of Lost River No. 313 in Saskatchewan
- Coordinates: 51.751°N 106.146°W
- Country: Canada
- Province: Saskatchewan
- Census division: 11
- SARM division: 5
- Formed: December 11, 1911

Government
  - Reeve: Charles E. Smith
  - Governing body: RM of Lost River No. 313 Council
  - Administrator: Christine Dyck
  - Office location: Allan

Area (2016)
  - Land: 549.92 km^{2} (212.33 sq mi)

Population (2016)
  - Total: 242
  - Density: 0.4/km^{2} (1.0/sq mi)
- Time zone: CST
  - Summer (DST): CST
- Area codes: 306 and 639

The Rural Municipality of Lost River No. 313 (2016 population: 242) is a rural municipality (RM) in the Canadian province of Saskatchewan within Census Division No. 11 and SARM Division No. 5. Located in the central portion of the province, it is adjacent to the South Saskatchewan River.

== History ==
The RM of Lost River No. 313 incorporated as a rural municipality on December 11, 1911.

== Geography ==
=== Communities and localities ===
The following unincorporated communities are within the RM.

Localities

- Allan Hills
- South Allan

== Allan Hills ==
The Allan Hills (51°40′0″N, 106°15′2″W) are a plateau south-east of Saskatoon and east of Blackstrap Lake mostly within the RM of Lost River. Parts of the plateau are also in the RM of Dundurn No. 314, RM of Morris No. 312, and RM of McCraney No. 282. South Allan and Allan Hills are the only communities located on the plateau. The Allan Hills rise about 100 metres from the surrounding prairies and the highest point is 658 metres above sea level. The plateau is dotted with several small lakes, including Willie Lake, Cygnet Lake, Horseshoe Lake, and Bultel Lake. Arm River starts near Horseshoe Lake at the south-east corner of the hills and flows south into Last Mountain Lake. Highway 764, a gravel road, is the main road through the hills. It starts at Allan and heads south past South Allan to Allan Hills. From there, it heads west to Hanley.

In December 2015, Ducks Unlimited Canada (DUC) partnered with local cattlemen to help preserve 21 quarters of land (about 13,440 acres) in the hills. It was the largest conservation agreement in DUC's history.

== Demographics ==
Population history (1981–2016)
Year	Pop.	±%
1981	382	—
1986	323	−15.4%
1991	260	−19.5%
1996	230	−11.5%
2001	227	−1.3%
2006	188	−17.2%
2011	209	+11.2%
2016	242	+15.8%
Source: Statistics Canada via Saskatchewan Bureau of Statistics

In the 2021 Census of Population conducted by Statistics Canada, the RM of Lost River No. 313 had a population of 252 living in 71 of its 80 total private dwellings, a change of 4.1% from its 2016 population of 242. With a land area of 549.96 km^{2} (212.34 sq mi), it had a population density of 0.5/km^{2} (1.2/sq mi) in 2021.

In the 2016 Census of Population, the RM of Lost River No. 313 recorded a population of 242 living in 70 of its 79 total private dwellings, a 15.8% change from its 2011 population of 209. With a land area of 549.92 km^{2} (212.33 sq mi), it had a population density of 0.4/km^{2} (1.1/sq mi) in 2016.

== Government ==
The RM of Lost River No. 313 is governed by an elected municipal council and an appointed administrator that meets on the second Tuesday of every month. The reeve of the RM is Charles E. Smith while its administrator is Christine Dyck. The RM's office is located in Allan.

== See also ==
- List of rural municipalities in Saskatchewan
