= The Nomadic Project =

- Kristin Abraham and Alfonso Llamas

Background information
- Genres: Conceptual Art Project
- Website: Official website

The Nomadic Project is a conceptual art project, designed by visual artist, Kristin Abraham and musician, Alfonso Llamas. From November 13, 2005 to December 21, 2006 the artists traveled to all 50 states in the United States, the goal being to connect the country through art by experiencing as much in each state as possible in one week. In that time, Abraham painted an impression based on the land or her experiences, or a combination of both. Llamas communicated his experiences by composing music with an acoustic guitar and laptop. As the artists traveled, each state's painting was left in a neighboring state, at an art gallery, art center, or museum, while music was posted on the project's website. This process connected the country, by bringing inspiration from one state and leaving it in the next. By December 21, 2006 the artists had visited and placed a painting in all fifty states.

Llamas and Abraham spent about a week in each state, with two weeks being set aside for Texas, California, and Alaska. They traveled in a Honda Element purchased specifically for the project. Llamas modified the vehicle with a storage unit, a refrigerator and a bed. They camped in National Parks, National Forests, and parking lots, spending a day or two in a hotel room each week for painting and creating.

== Development ==
Llamas and Abraham met in Ft. Myers, Florida in early 2002, when Llamas became guitar player for the indie rock band, The Penny Arcade, which at the time, Abraham's sister was lead singer for the band. The two formed a friendship based on their love of music and art and eventually started dating. At this time the couple developed the initial concept for what would become The Nomadic Project. The couple married in November 2003. Originally the project was designed as a personal journey combining their creative passions and desire to travel. The project took a new direction as the couple saw the impact that the 2004 Elections and Iraq War were having on the country. Llamas and Abraham have said it was then they decided to have a painting for each state and to connect the country through art. Llamas and Abraham funded the project solely through the sale of artwork and personal savings. The couple has credited husband and wife artists, Christo and Jeanne-Claude as inspiration for funding their project entirely themselves. In November 2005, three years after they first dreamed of The Nomadic Project, they sold their home and possessions and set out from Ft. Myers, Florida.

== Purpose ==
While traveling cross the country The Nomadic Project was greeted with mixed reactions. Most people applauded the duo's creativity and courage in such an ambitious undertaking, while some dismissed it as two unknown artists involved in an oddball project. For the most part, criticism was minimal and the project received extensive media coverage throughout the country. On December 20, 2006 in a radio interview with WORT in Madison, Wisconsin, the couple spoke of their desire to not only share their experiences with others, but to also inspire people to get out and see the country. They went further to say they felt the country is divided between religious, political, and racial lines, with the Iraq War being the biggest divider. The couple express their hope that through the project, people will be reminded that despite differences, all Americans can agree that they live in a very beautiful and unique country.

== Exhibit ==
On October 17, 2007 a nationwide traveling exhibit, displaying all 50 paintings, music, video footage, and journal entries from the journey began. It started in Aiken, South Carolina at Aiken Center for the Arts.

== Sources ==
The Providence Journal, "'Nomadic Artists leave a painting in every state", Bryan Rourke, December 21, 2006

New Hampshire Register, "'Guilford Art Center lands a part in couple's dream Nomadic Project", Donna Doherty, December 17, 2006

Alexandria Times, "'The Nomadic Project comes to Old Town", Carla Branch, December 14, 2006

Fox 42 KPTM, "'Two artists and fifty galleries connect the U.S. through art", Community Correspondent, December 13, 2006

Argus Leader, "Nomadic couple heads to 50 states to create", Jay Kirschenmann, Sunday, August 20, 2006

Times Record, "Nomadic Project Comes To Town", Pam Cloud, January 31, 2006
