= Allan Hill =

Allan G. Hill is a British-American demographer currently the Andelot Professor at Harvard T.H. Chan School of Public Health and, in 1991, was awarded an honorary doctorate by Harvard.

== Education ==
- BA, 1966, University College, Durham, UK
- PhD, 1969, Durham University, Durham, UK
- Diploma in Demography, 1975, Princeton University
- MA Honoris Causa, 1991, Harvard University
