= Saskatchewan Highway 35 =

Provincial highway in Saskatchewan, Canada

Highway 35
- CanAm Highway (segment)
- Highway 35 highlighted in red
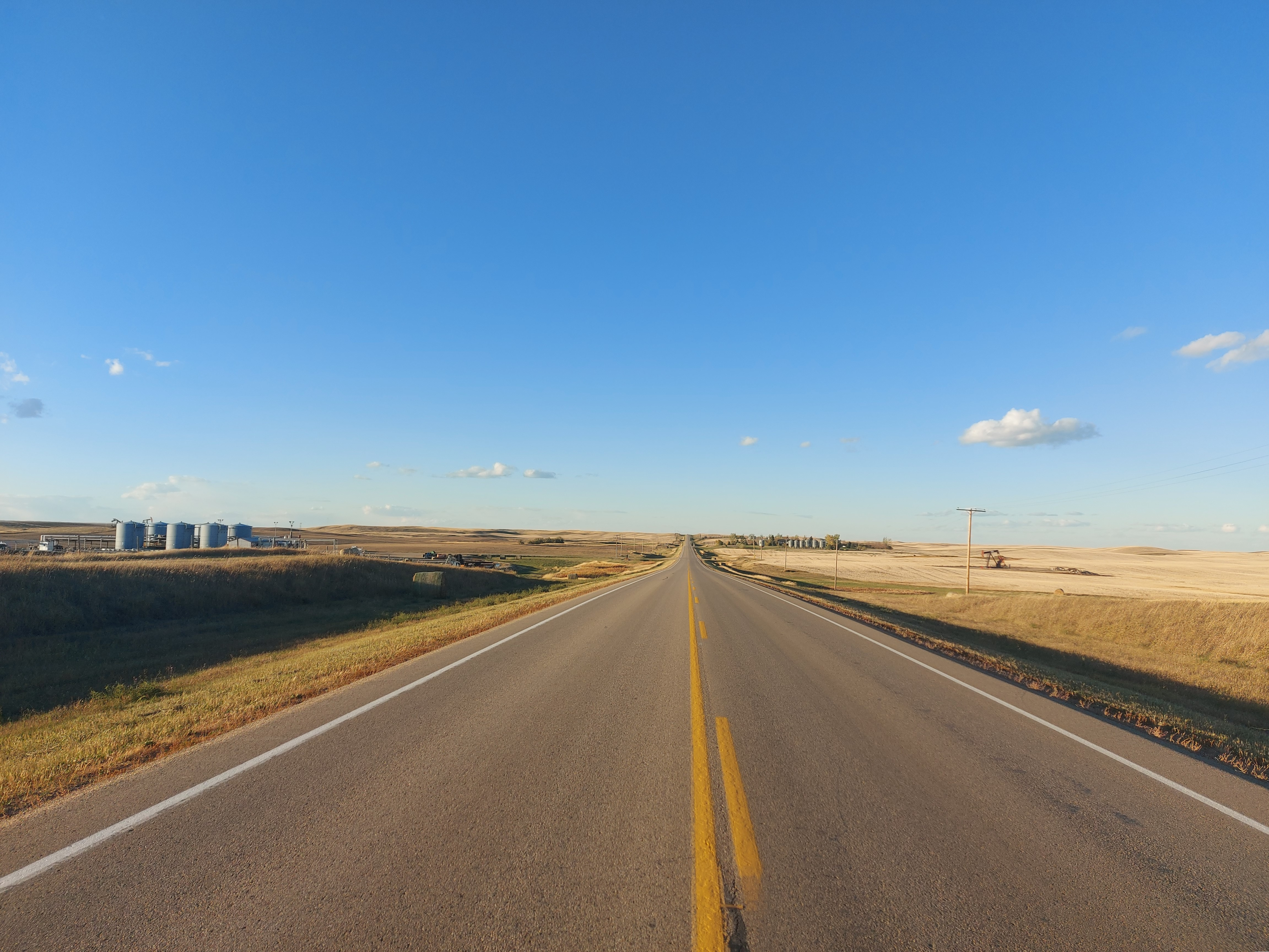
- Highway 35 near its southern terminus

Route information
- Maintained by Ministry of Highways and Infrastructure & Transport Canada
- Length: 568.9 km (353.5 mi)

Major junctions
- South end: US 85 at the U.S. border near Oungre
- Highway 18 at Oungre; Highway 13 in Weyburn; Highway 1 (TCH) near Qu'Appelle; Highway 10 at Fort Qu'Appelle; Highway 22 at Lipton; Highway 15 at Leross; Highway 16 (TCH/YH) near Elfros; Highway 5 at Wadena; Highway 3 at Tisdale; Highway 55 at Nipawin and White Fox
- North end: Torch River north of Tobin Lake

Location
- Country: Canada
- Province: Saskatchewan
- Rural municipalities: Souris Valley, Lomond, Wellington, Francis, South Qu'Appelle, North Qu'Appelle, Lipton, Emerald, Elfros, Lakeview, Ponass Lake, Barrier Valley, Tisdale, Connaught, Torch River, Nipawin
- Major cities: Weyburn

Highway system
- Provincial highways in Saskatchewan
← Highway 34	→ Highway 36

Highway 35 is a paved, undivided provincial highway in the Canadian province of Saskatchewan. It runs from the U.S. border at the Port of Oungre (where it meets U.S. Route 85) north to a dead end near the north shore of Tobin Lake. The southern end of Highway 35 is one segment of the CanAm Highway, which is an international highway connecting Canada, the United States, and Mexico. Highway 35 is about 569 kilometres (354 mi) long.

Highway 35 connects with the following major Saskatchewan highways: 18, 39, 33, 48, 1, 22, 15, 16, 5, 3, and 55. Major communities along the highway include Weyburn, Qu'Appelle, Fort Qu'Appelle, Wadena, Tisdale, and Nipawin. Parks accessed from the highway include Oungre Memorial Regional Park, Mission Ridge Winter Park, Nipawin & District Regional Park, and Tobin Lake Recreation Site (Caroll's Cove Campground).

Mudslides and spring flooding were huge road-building and maintenance problems on various stretches of Highway 35, including along the southern portion through the Greater Yellow Grass Marsh and along the Souris River, in the middle section through the Qu'Appelle Valley, and in the northern section by Nipawin and at the Saskatchewan River. Several dams and water control measures were built over the years to control flooding.

The 2018 Humboldt Broncos bus crash occurred on Highway 35 at the intersection with Highway 335 about 28 kilometres (17 mi) north of Tisdale.

== Route description ==
Highway 35 traverses three distinct topographical areas from its southern end to its northern terminus. The rolling moraines and valleys of the mixed grassland at its southern end give way to aspen parkland towards the middle section. The northern portion of the route is within the southern boreal forest which consists of agricultural land mixed with heavily forested areas. Beginning at the border with the US, the highway heads north crossing other major highways, such as the Trans-Canada and the Yellowhead, major rivers, such as the Qu'Appelle and the Saskatchewan, and ends at Tobin Lake in east-central Saskatchewan.

=== Port of Oungre to the Trans-Canada Highway ===
Highway 35 begins at the Port of Oungre border crossing. Going north from the border, it meets Highway 18 at Oungre, provides access to Oungre Regional Park, and crosses Long Creek. From Long Creek, the highway passes through Tribune and carries on to Weyburn where it crosses the Souris River and meets Highways 13 and 39. Weyburn is the only city on Highway 35 and has been dubbed the Soo Line City due its connection with Chicago on the Soo Line of the Canadian Pacific Railway (CPR). Weyburn is located astride the Williston geological Basin which contains oil deposits, and several wells operate in the vicinity. Notable points of interest in Weyburn accessible from Highway 39 include the Soo Line Historical Museum, Tommy Douglas statue, Weyburn Heritage Village, and the Water Tower. Off Highway 35, at the north end of Weyburn, is access to the site of the former Souris Valley Mental Health Hospital, which at the time of its construction in the 1920s, was the largest building in the British Commonwealth. From Weyburn, the highway continues north past Cedoux and on to Highway 33 and Francis. After Francis, it continues north crossing Highway 48 before meeting Highway 1.

==== CanAm Highway ====
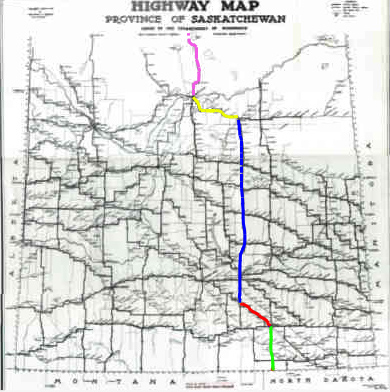
CanAm Highway Legend through Saskatchewan: Sk 35 — green Sk 39 — red Sk 6 — blue Sk 3 — yellow Sk 2 — pink

The southern portion of Highway 35 from the Port of Oungre at the Canada–United States border to the city of Weyburn forms the initial segment of the CanAm Highway in Saskatchewan. This segment is 74.6 kilometres (46.4 mi) long. Other highways in Saskatchewan that are part of the CanAm Highway network include 39, 6, 3, and 2. The CanAm Highway was a concept that begun in the 1920s and is an important route for the North American Free Trade Agreement (NAFTA) super corridor connecting Mexico, the United States, and Canada.

=== Trans-Canada to the Yellowhead Highway ===
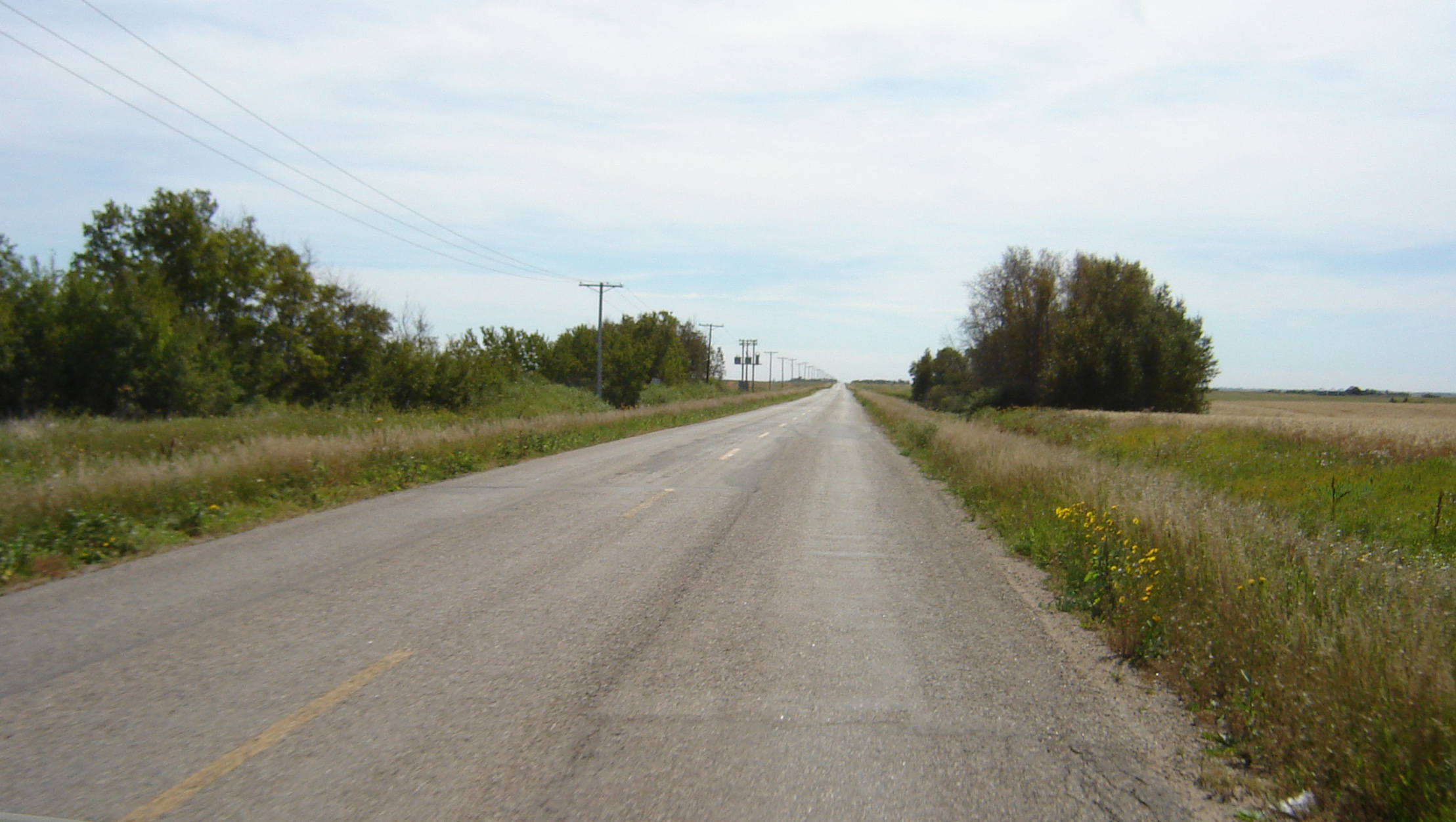
Highway 35 between Fort Qu'Appelle and Qu'Appelle

Highway 35 has a short 700-metre (2,300 ft) westward concurrency with Highway 1 before turning north. About 2 kilometres (1.2 mi) from Highway 1, Highway 35 enters the town of Qu'Appelle where it follows N Pacific Avenue west then Qu'Appelle St north through town. Qu'Appelle had historic beginnings with fur trading posts in the area and was the former terminus of the CPR. From Qu'Appelle, Highway 35 heads north where it meets, and has a concurrency with, Highway 10 en route to Fort Qu'Appelle in the Qu'Appelle Valley. At Fort Qu'Appelle, Highway 35 is met by other highways including 22, 56, and 210. Fort Qu'Appelle is situated on the Qu'Appelle River between Echo and Mission Lakes of the Fishing Lakes. The town has a vibrant history being an early fur trading post. The 1897 Hudson's Bay Company store, 1911 Grand Trunk Pacific Railway station, Fort Qu'Appelle Sanatorium (Fort San), and the Treaty 4 Governance Centre are all landmarks of Fort Qu'Appelle. In Fort Qu'Appelle, Highway 35's concurrency with 10 ends as Highway 10 continues on eastward. It then begins a 16-kilometre (9.9 mi) concurrency with Highway 22 as it climbs out of the valley and heads north towards Lipton. At this point, Highway 22 branches off west while Highway 35 carries on north through the Touchwood Hills en route to Highway 15 and Leross. It crosses Highway 15 and traverses the western part of the Beaver Hills as it makes its way past Bankend to the Yellowhead Highway and Elfros.

=== Yellowhead to Tobin Lake ===
Once Highway 35 crosses the Yellowhead, it passes by the western shore of the Quill Lakes and meets Highway 5 at Wadena. Points of interest in Wadena accessible from the highway include the Wadena & District Museum and the Jesmer & Milligan Marsh Projects Interpretative Centre with information regarding the Quill Lakes International Shorebird Reserve. Highway 35 continues north from Wadena passing Hendon, Highway 49, Fosston, Ponass Lakes, and Rose Valley before entering the village of Archerwill. As the highway enters Archerwill, it is met by, and begins a 14-kilometre (8.7 mi) concurrency with, Highway 349. At the north end of Archerwill, the highway turns west and follows the southern shore of George Williams Lake. At the west end of the lake, 349 heads west and 35 once again resumes its northerly routing towards the junction with Highway 3 and the town of Tisdale. Tisdale is located in the heart of an agricultural community and honours the farming community with a big roadside statue of a honey bee.

North of Tisdale, Highway 35 crosses Saskatchewan's tree line into boreal forest en route to Nipawin. The southern boreal forest is marked by aspen combined with jack pine, tamarack, and white spruce. Communities along this stretch of highway to Nipawin include Leacross, Armley, Pontrilas, and Codette. Armley, at the intersection of 35 and 335, is near the site of the Humboldt Broncos bus crash. That intersection is known as "Armley Corner". Nipawin, known as "the Town on Two Lakes", is situated between two man-made lakes along the Saskatchewan River, Tobin and Codette Lakes. In 1963, Squaw Rapids Dam was built across the Saskatchewan River creating Tobin Lake. The dam was renamed in 1988 to E.B. Campbell Dam. Codette Lake is impounded by the Francois-Finlay Dam, which was completed in 1986. Access to the Francois Finlay Hydroelectric Dam Vista Viewpoint is from Highway 35, 5 kilometres (3.1 mi) south of Nipawin. Near the centre of town, the highway is met by Highway 55 where the two highways begin a 12-kilometre (7.5 mi) concurrency that leaves Nipawin, passes by Nipawin Regional Park, and crosses the Saskatchewan River. Just before White Fox, the two highways diverge with 55 headed west to White Fox and 35 continuing north for another 7 kilometres (4.3 mi) before turning east. Highway 35 then skirts along the north-western shore of Tobin Lake to a dead end, giving access to Carroll's Cove Campground and Pruden's Point Resort.

== History ==
Highway 35 runs south to north, and historically did not run on the square following both range and township surveyed road allowances, but rather was allowed to run straight and true along township roads for the most part. Between Wadena and Nipawin, the highway travelled parallel to the rail.

A ferry was the first method of transport across the Saskatchewan River at Nipawin. When ferry travel was unsafe because of the ice break up, a basket, which was propelled above the river on wire, could safely transport persons and mail across the river. In 1932, the combined CPR and traffic bridge opened to traffic across the Saskatchewan River at Nipawin, which retired the ferry and basket crossing. The railway / traffic bridge that formed part of Highway 35 was the only crossing utilized at Nipawin until a new traffic bridge was constructed in 1974. The new bridge then became part of the Highway 35 / 55 concurrency. The old railway / traffic bridge continues to be utilized for one lane vehicle traffic controlled by traffic lights. It continues on as the "Old Highway 35" on the west side of the river until it joins with the current Highway 35 / 55 concurrency south of White Fox.

In 1953, a rapid flow landslide destroyed a portion of Highway 35 near Fort Qu'Appelle in the Echo Creek Valley. The construction of the Qu'Appelle River Dam in 1967 helped to eliminate washed out roads and flooded communities downstream. Twenty-one dams were built in the pioneering days to help with the yearly flooding in the Qu'Appelle Valley.

== Major intersections ==
From south to north:

Rural municipality	Location	km	mi	Destinations	Notes
Souris Valley No. 7	Port of Oungre	0.0	0.0	US 85 south (CanAm Highway) – Fortuna, Williston	Southern terminus; continuation into North Dakota; CanAm Highway is unsigned in the U.S.
Souris Valley No. 7	Port of Oungre	0.0	0.0	Canada–United States border at Fortuna–Oungre Border Crossing	
Souris Valley No. 7		9.8	6.1	Highway 707 west – Beaubier	
Souris Valley No. 7	Oungre	16.2	10.1	Highway 18 – Minton, Estevan	
Souris Valley No. 7	Tribune	27.9	17.3		
Lomond No. 37		46.2	28.7	Highway 705 west – Colgate	South end of Highway 705 concurrency
Lomond No. 37		52.7	32.7	Highway 705 east – Halbrite	North end of Highway 705 concurrency
City of Weyburn		74.6	46.4	Highway 39 / CanAm Highway – Moose Jaw, Regina, Estevan	CanAm Highway follows Highway 39 north
City of Weyburn		74.7	46.4	Crosses the Souris River	
City of Weyburn		75.7	47.0	Highway 13 (1st Avenue NW / Red Coat Trail) – Assiniboia, Carlyle	
Wellington No. 97		98.4	61.1	Highway 742 east – Fillmore	
Wellington No. 97		107.1	66.5	Highway 306 west – Colfax, Riceton	
Francis No. 127	Francis	124.0	77.1	Highway 33 – Regina, Stoughton	
Francis No. 127	Francis	124.6	77.4	Highway 708 east	
Francis No. 127		147.1	91.4	Highway 48 – Regina, Montmartre	Between Vibank and Odessa
South Qu'Appelle No. 157		171.8	106.8	Highway 1 (TCH) east – Indian Head, Winnipeg	Highway 35 branches west; south end of Highway 1 concurrency
South Qu'Appelle No. 157	Qu'Appelle	172.4	107.1	Highway 1 (TCH) west – Regina	Highway 35 branches north; north end of Highway 1 concurrency
North Qu'Appelle No. 187		192.2	119.4	Highway 10 west – Regina	Highway 35 branches east; south end of Highway 10 concurrency
North Qu'Appelle No. 187	Fort Qu'Appelle	202.5	125.8	Highway 10 east – Melville, Yorkton	Highway 35 branches north; north end of Highway 10 concurrency
North Qu'Appelle No. 187	Fort Qu'Appelle	202.7	126.0	Highway 210 west (Broadway) – Echo Valley Provincial Park	
North Qu'Appelle No. 187	Fort Qu'Appelle	203.2	126.3	Crosses the Qu'Appelle River	
North Qu'Appelle No. 187	Fort Qu'Appelle	203.4	126.4	Highway 56 – Fort San, Indian Head	
Lipton No. 217	Lipton	218.3	135.6	Highway 22 west – Southey	
Lipton No. 217		246.9	153.4	Highway 731 – Ituna	
Lipton No. 217	Leross	261.3	162.4	Highway 15 – Raymore, Ituna, Melville	
Emerald No. 277		290.9	180.8	Highway 743 – Wishart	
Elfros No. 307	Elfros	311.7	193.7	Highway 16 (TCH/YH) – Saskatoon, Yorkton	
Elfros No. 307		315.2	195.9	Highway 745 east	
Lakeview No. 337	Wadena	335.6	208.5	Highway 5 – Saskatoon, Humboldt, Canora	
Lakeview No. 337	Hendon	351.7	218.5	Highway 758 west – Quill Lake	
↑ / ↓		358.2	222.6	Highway 49 east – Kelvington, Preeceville	
Ponass Lake No. 367	Fosston	363.9	226.1	Highway 760 east	
Ponass Lake No. 367	Rose Valley	374.5	232.7	Highway 756 east	South end of Highway 756 concurrency
Ponass Lake No. 367		377.8	234.8	Highway 756 west – Spalding	North end of Highway 756 concurrency
Barrier Valley No. 397	Archerwill	391.0	243.0	Highway 349 east	South end of Highway 349 concurrency
Barrier Valley No. 397		404.5	251.3	Highway 349 west – Naicam	North end of Highway 349 concurrency
Barrier Valley No. 397		419.6	260.7	Highway 733 west – Pleasantdale	South end of Highway 773 concurrency
Barrier Valley No. 397		422.8	262.7	Highway 773 east – McKague, Chelan	North end of Highway 773 concurrency
Tisdale No. 427		432.8	268.9	Highway 776 – Sylvania, Bjorkdale	
Tisdale No. 427	Tisdale	449.2	279.1	Highway 3 – Melfort, Hudson Bay	
Connaught No. 457		473.0	293.9	Highway 748 east – Zenon Park	
Connaught No. 457		473.8	294.4	Ridgedale access road	
Connaught No. 457	Armley	478.7	297.5	Highway 335 – Gronlid, Arborfield	Site of the Humboldt Broncos bus crash
Nipawin No. 487	Codette	498.2	309.6	Highway 789 – Carrot River	
Nipawin No. 487	Nipawin	506.8	314.9	Old Highway 35 north	Connects to the Crooked Bridge (Old Nipawin Bridge)
Nipawin No. 487	Nipawin	508.3	315.8	Highway 55 east (Nipawin Road / NWWR) – Carrot River	South end of Highway 55 concurrency
↑ / ↓		512.4	318.4	Nipawin Bridge across the Saskatchewan River	
Torch River No. 488		518.1	321.9	Old Highway 35 south	Connects to the Crooked Bridge (Old Nipawin Bridge)
Torch River No. 488	White Fox	520.3	323.3	Highway 55 west (NWWR) – Prince Albert	North end of Highway 55 concurrency
Torch River No. 488	Tobin Lake	568.9	353.5		Northern terminus
1.000 mi = 1.609 km; 1.000 km = 0.621 mi: Concurrency terminus; Route transition

== See also ==
- Transportation in Saskatchewan
- Roads in Saskatchewan

== Extra reading ==
Title: Homestead to Heritage, Author Armley History Book Committee, Publisher Friesen Printers, 1987

Preceded by US 85	CanAm Highway; Hwy 35	Succeeded by Highway 39
