= Rural Municipality of Tisdale No. 427 =

Rural municipality in Saskatchewan, Canada

Tisdale No. 427 Eldersley No. 427 (1912–1921)
- Rural municipality
- Rural Municipality of Tisdale No. 427
- Location of the RM of Tisdale No. 427 in Saskatchewan
- Coordinates: 52.807°N 104.004°W
- Country: Canada
- Province: Saskatchewan
- Census division: 14
- SARM division: 4
- Formed: December 9, 1912
- Name change: January 15, 1921 (from RM of Eldersley No. 427)

Government
  - Reeve: Ian Allan
  - Governing body: RM of Tisdale No. 427 Council
  - Administrator: Dawn Marleau
  - Office location: Tisdale

Area (2016)
  - Land: 847.39 km^{2} (327.18 sq mi)

Population (2016)
  - Total: 911
  - Density: 1.1/km^{2} (2.8/sq mi)
- Time zone: CST
  - Summer (DST): CST
- Area codes: 306 and 639

The Rural Municipality of Tisdale No. 427 (2016 population: 911) is a rural municipality (RM) in the Canadian province of Saskatchewan within Census Division No. 14 and SARM Division No. 4. It is located in the northeast-central portion of the province.

== History ==
The RM of Eldersley No. 427 was originally incorporated as a rural municipality on December 9, 1912. Its name was changed to the RM of Tisdale No. 427 on January 15, 1921. Prior to incorporation in 1912, it was originally Local Improvement District 21-M-2.

== Geography ==
=== Communities and localities ===
The following urban municipalities are surrounded by the RM.

Towns

- Tisdale

The following unincorporated communities are within the RM.

Organized hamlets

- Sylvania

Localities

- Eldersley

== Demographics ==
Population history (1981–2016)
Year	Pop.	±%
1981	1,359	—
1986	1,351	−0.6%
1991	1,163	−13.9%
1996	1,137	−2.2%
2001	1,053	−7.4%
2006	938	−10.9%
2011	916	−2.3%
2016	911	−0.5%
Source: Statistics Canada via Saskatchewan Bureau of Statistics

In the 2021 Census of Population conducted by Statistics Canada, the RM of Tisdale No. 427 had a population of 885 living in 352 of its 374 total private dwellings, a change of −2.9% from its 2016 population of 911. With a land area of 843.02 km^{2} (325.49 sq mi), it had a population density of 1.0/km^{2} (2.7/sq mi) in 2021.

In the 2016 Census of Population, the RM of Tisdale No. 427 recorded a population of 911 living in 352 of its 365 total private dwellings, a −0.5% change from its 2011 population of 916. With a land area of 847.39 km^{2} (327.18 sq mi), it had a population density of 1.1/km^{2} (2.8/sq mi) in 2016.

== Government ==
The RM of Tisdale No. 427 is governed by an elected municipal council and an appointed administrator that meets on the second Thursday of every month. The reeve of the RM is Ian Allan while its administrator is Dawn Marleau. The RM's office is located in Tisdale.

== Transportation ==
Rail

- Tisdale Subdivision C.P.R - serves Barford, McKague, Sylvania, Golburn, Tisdale, Lurgan, Runciman, Leacross, Armley
- Tisdale Subdivision C.N.R - serves Bannock, Mistatim, Peesane, Crooked River, Eldersley, Tisdale, Valparaiso, Star City, Melfort

Roads

- Highway 3 serves Tisdale
- Highway 35
- Highway 680
- Highway 776

== See also ==
- List of rural municipalities in Saskatchewan
