= Saskatchewan Highway 335 =

Provincial highway in Saskatchewan, Canada

Highway 335

Route information
- Maintained by Ministry of Highways and Infrastructure
- Length: 50.5 km (31.4 mi)

Major junctions
- West end: Highway 6 / Highway 789 at Gronlid
- Highway 35 at Armley
- East end: Highway 23 near Arborfield

Location
- Country: Canada
- Province: Saskatchewan
- Rural municipalities: Willow Creek, Connaught, Arborfield

Highway system
- Provincial highways in Saskatchewan
← Highway 334	→ Highway 339

Highway 335 is a provincial highway in the Canadian province of Saskatchewan. It runs from Highway 6 / Highway 789 in Gronlid to Highway 23 west of Arborfield. It is about 51 kilometres (32 mi) long.

Highway 335 passes near the communities of Gronlid, Armley, and Nicklen, and also intersects Highway 681 and Highway 35. The intersection with Highway 35 at Amrley was the scene of a 2018 collision resulting in 16 fatalities of the Humboldt Broncos, a team of the Saskatchewan Junior Hockey League.

== Route description ==
Hwy 335 begins in the Rural Municipality of Willow Creek No. 458 at a junction with Hwy 6 / Hwy 789 (West Avenue) on the north end of Gronlid, heading east to leave the hamlet as it crosses the path of a former railway line. Travelling through rural farmland, it passes just to the south of Ratner to have an intersection with Hwy 681 north of Brooksby and enter the Rural Municipality of Connaught No. 457. Continuing on through rural areas, the highway has an intersection with Range Road 2154 (provides access to Ridgedale) and crosses over the Carrot River to pass through the southern end of Armley, where it crosses the Canadian National Railway's Brooksby Subdivision and Hwy 35 at the site of the Humboldt Broncos bus crash. Hwy 335 now crosses the Leather River and has an intersection with Hwy 691 at the locality of Ditton Park before entering the Rural Municipality of Arborfield No. 456 just north of the village of Zenon Park (accessed via Park Road (Range Road 2130)). A few kilometres later, Hwy 335 comes to an end at an intersection with Hwy 23 just west of the town of Arborfield. The entire length of Hwy 335 is a paved, two-lane highway.

== Major intersections ==
From south to north:

Rural municipality	Location	km	mi	Destinations	Notes
Willow Creek No. 458	Gronlid	0.0	0.0	Highway 6 / Highway 789 – Choiceland, Melfort	Western terminus
Willow Creek No. 458		8.1	5.0	Highway 681 south (Vickar Road) – Brooksby	
Connaught No. 457		21.2	13.2	Range Road 2154 – Ridgedale	
Connaught No. 457		23.2	14.4	Bridge over the Carrot River	
Connaught No. 457	Armley	29.3	18.2	Highway 35 – Nipawin, Tisdale	Site of the Humboldt Broncos bus crash
Connaught No. 457		37.8	23.5	Bridge over the Leather River	
Connaught No. 457	Ditton Park	43.9	27.3	Highway 691 – Aylsham	
Connaught No. 457 / Arborfield No. 456 boundary		47.2	29.3	Zenon Park access road	
Arborfield No. 456		50.5	31.4	Highway 23 – Arborfield, Carrot River, Crooked River	Eastern terminus
1.000 mi = 1.609 km; 1.000 km = 0.621 mi

== See also ==
- Transportation in Saskatchewan
- Roads in Saskatchewan
