= Saskatchewan Highway 23 =

Provincial highway in Saskatchewan, Canada

Highway 23
- Highway 23 highlighted in red

Route information
- Maintained by Ministry of Highways and Infrastructure
- Length: 165.6 km (102.9 mi)

Major junctions
- South end: Highway 9 at Bertwell
- Highway 38 at Chelan; Highway 3 at Crooked River
- North end: Highway 55 near Carrot River

Location
- Country: Canada
- Province: Saskatchewan
- Rural municipalities: Hudson Bay, Porcupine, Bjorkdale, Arborfield, Moose Range
- Towns: Carrot River, Porcupine Plain

Highway system
- Provincial highways in Saskatchewan
← Highway 22	→ Highway 24

Highway 23 is a provincial highway in the north-eastern part of the Canadian province of Saskatchewan that runs from Highway 55 near Carrot River south-east to Highway 9 at Bertwell. It is paved for the majority of its length, but has a 25-kilometre (16 mi) gravel section between Weekes and Highway 55. The highway is approximately 166 kilometres (103 mi) long

== Route description ==
Highway 23 begins at Highway 55 about 9 kilometres (5.6 mi) north of the town of Carrot River. Continuing south from Carrot River, the highway provides access to Pasquia Regional Park and crosses the Carrot River. About 8.5 kilometres (5.3 mi) south of the river crossing, the highway turns west where it passes through Arborfield. A short distance west of Arborfield, the highway turns back south where it continues this southerly travel until just north of Bjorkdale. This section of highway has a 3.3-kilometre (2.1 mi) concurrency with Highway 3 and provides access to Crooked River.

From Bjorkdale, Highway 23 heads east to its southern terminus at Highway 9. Communities along this stretch of highway include Chelan, Porcupine Plain, Carragana, Somme, Weekes, and Bertwell. North-west of Chelan, Highway 23 crosses the Red Deer River and near Bertwell, it crosses the Etomami River.

== Major intersections ==
From south to north:

Rural municipality	Location	km	mi	Destinations	Notes
Hudson Bay No. 394	Bertwell	0.0	0.0	Highway 9 – Hudson Bay, Preeceville, Yorkton	Southern terminus
Porcupine No. 395	Somme	31.3	19.4	Highway 984 south – Piwei River Provincial Recreation Site	
Porcupine No. 395	Carragana	41.2	25.6	Highway 677 north (Range Road 2084) – Prairie River	
Porcupine No. 395	Porcupine Plain	51.5	32.0	Highway 678 (Range Road 2094)	
Bjorkdale No. 426	Chelan	61.4	38.2	Highway 38 south to Highway 773 west – Kelvington	
Bjorkdale No. 426	Bjorkdale	82.3	51.1	Highway 679 south (Range Road 2123) – Nobleville	
Bjorkdale No. 426	Bjorkdale	83.0	51.6	Highway 776 west (Township Road 433) – Sylvania	
Bjorkdale No. 426	Crooked River	99.2	61.6	Highway 3 west – Tisdale, Melfort, Prince Albert	Southern end of Hwy 3 concurrency
Bjorkdale No. 426		102.5	63.7	Highway 3 east – Hudson Bay	Northern end of Hwy 3 concurrency
Arborfield No. 456		122.1	75.9	Zenon Park Access Road	
Arborfield No. 456		128.6	79.9	Highway 335 west – Armley, Gronlid	
Arborfield No. 456	Arborfield	131.8	81.9	Range Road 2122	
Arborfield No. 456		136.1	84.6	Highway 690 east (Township Road 476)	
Moose Range No. 486		149.4	92.8	Highway 789 east (Township Road 492)	Southern end of Hwy 789 concurrency
Moose Range No. 486	Carrot River	156.1	97.0	Highway 789 west (Township Road 500) – Codette	Northern end of Hwy 789 concurrency
Moose Range No. 486		165.6	102.9	Highway 55 (NWWR) – Nipawin, The Pas; To Highway 123 north – Cumberland House	Northern terminus
1.000 mi = 1.609 km; 1.000 km = 0.621 mi: Concurrency terminus
