= List of francophone communities in Saskatchewan =

This is a list of francophone communities in Saskatchewan. Municipalities with a high percentage of French-speakers in the Canadian province of Saskatchewan are listed.

The provincial average of Saskatchewanians whose mother tongue is French is 1.1%, with a total of 12,565 people in Saskatchewan who identify French as their mother tongue in 2021. While several communities in these have sizeable French minorities, no municipalities have francophone majorities.

There are several Fransaskois communities throughout Saskatchewan, although the majority of francophones in Saskatchewan reside in the province's three largest cities, Saskatoon, Regina, and Prince Albert.

Municipality	Type	County, district, or regional municipality	Total population	Percentage of population whose mother tongue is French
Aberdeen	Rural municipality	Saskatoon	1,461	2%
Assiniboia	Town	Assiniboia	2,333	4%
Battle River	Rural municipality	North Battleford	1,029	3%
Buckland	Rural municipality	Prince Albert	3,277	3%
Candle Lake	Resort village	Prince Albert	1,160	3%
Canwood	Rural municipality	North Battleford	1,351	8%
Duck Lake	Rural municipality	Prince Albert	1,010	5%
Lakeland	Rural municipality	Prince Albert	1,300	2%
Meota	Rural municipality	Lloydminster	1,110	3%
Moose Jaw	Rural municipality	Moose Jaw	1,207	4%
Paddockwood	Rural municipality	Prince Albert	1,071	3%
Prince Albert	Rural municipality	Prince Albert	3,438	3%
Redvers	Town	Estevan	1,008	11%
Shellbrook	Town	North Battleford	1,510	2%
Spiritwood	Rural municipality	North Battleford	1,245	4%
St. Louis	Rural municipality	Prince Albert	1,029	26%

A number of small municipalities also have high francophone populations. Small francophone-minority municipalities include: Aberdeen (2%), Albertville (17%), Antler (9%), Arborfield (6%), Arborfield (2%), Auvergne (3%), B-Say-Tah (3%), Bayne (3%), Beatty (8%), Big River (2%), Birch Hills (2%), Bird's Point (3%), Bjorkdale (3%), Bjorkdale (2%), Blaine Lake (2%), Briercrest (3%), Broderick (5%), Bruno (3%), Buchanan (2%), Burstall (3%), Cadillac (4%), Chitek Lake (5%), Cochin (2%), Colonsay (2%), Connaught (8%), Creelman (5%), Cut Knife (2%), Debden (20%), Duck Lake (8%), Edam (3%), Eyebrow (4%), Fenwood (13%), Fish Creek (3%), Gainsborough (2%), Garden River (7%), Glen Harbour (6%), Glen McPherson (7%), Glenavon (3%), Grandview (2%), Grant (17%), Gravelbourg (19%), Gravelbourg (10%), Heart's Hill (2%), Hoodoo (4%), Jansen (4%), Kelliher (2%), Kelvington (3%), Lac Pelletier (4%), Lafleche (6%), Lake Lenore (7%), Landis (11%), Laurier (2%), Leask (3%), Leoville (10%), Leroy (2%), Leslie Beach (5%), Liberty (8%), Lucky Lake (2%), Makwa (13%), Mankota (7%), Mankota (3%), Marcelin (7%), Martin (2%), Maymont (3%), Meacham (5%), Meath Park (3%), Meota (5%), Milden (3%), Montmartre (6%), Moose Mountain (2%), Moosomin (3%), Morse (2%), Naicam (2%), North Portal (4%), Norton (2%), Old Post (3%), Paynton (2%), Pebble Baye (7%), Pinto Creek (6%), Ponass Lake (2%), Ponteix (16%), Poplar Valley (3%), Prud'homme (3%), Punnichy (2%), Quinton (6%), Radisson (2%), Radville (4%), Rama (7%), Reciprocity (7%), Richmound (4%), Riverhurst (3%), Rocanville (3%), Rockglen (3%), Rodgers (5%), Rose Valley (2%), Rosemount (3%), Shamrock (3%), Shell Lake (3%), Shields (3%), Sliding Hills (2%), Smeaton (3%), Spalding (2%), Spalding (2%), Spiritwood (3%), Spy Hill (3%), St. Brieux (5%), St. Louis (10%), St. Walburg (3%), Storthoaks (12%), Storthoaks (6%), Sutton (11%), Thode (3%), Tobin Lake (4%), Torquay (2%), Turtle River (3%), Turtleford (2%), Val Marie (4%), Vanguard (3%), Vonda (9%), Wakaw (3%), Waverley (3%). Wee Too Beach (7%), Weldon (7%), White Valley (3%), Willow Bunch (14%), Willow Bunch (10%), Wise Creek (11%), Wood River (5%) and Zenon Park (31%).

== See also ==
- French Canadians
- Geographical distribution of French speakers
- List of municipalities in Saskatchewan
