= Humboldt Broncos bus crash =

2018 collision in Saskatchewan, Canada

Coordinates: 53.1037°N 104.0265°W

Humboldt Broncos Bus Crash
- Crash site (Saskatchewan) Crash site (Canada)

Details
- Date: April 6, 2018; 8 years ago
- Location: Intersection of Saskatchewan Highway 35 and Saskatchewan Highway 335 near Armley, Saskatchewan, Canada
- Incident type: Collision
- Cause: Failure to yield at stop sign

Statistics
- Bus: Charlie's Charters and semi-truck owned by Adesh Deol Trucking Ltd
- Vehicles: 2
- Passengers: 28 + bus driver & semi driver
- Deaths: 16
- Injured: 13

Armley Corner, the location of the crash
Location of the crash in relation to Humboldt, Nipawin and to nearby cities of Saskatoon and Prince Albert

On April 6, 2018, 16 people were killed and 13 were injured when a northbound coach bus was struck by a westbound semi-trailer truck that failed to stop at a flashing stop sign at the intersection of Saskatchewan Highways 35 and 335 near Armley, Saskatchewan, Canada, while driving at a speed of approximately 100 km/h (60 mph). Most of the deceased and injured were players from the Humboldt Broncos, a junior ice hockey team from Humboldt, Saskatchewan, which plays in the Saskatchewan Junior Hockey League (SJHL).

On July 6, 2018, the Royal Canadian Mounted Police (RCMP) charged 29-year-old Jaskirat Singh Sidhu, the driver of the truck, with sixteen counts of dangerous operation of a motor vehicle causing death and thirteen counts of dangerous operation of a motor vehicle causing bodily injury. In early 2019, Sidhu pleaded guilty to the charges and was sentenced to eight years in prison. Sidhu, an immigrant from India, was scheduled to be deported on April 27, 2026, but the Federal Court granted a stay on April 24 pending his legal challenge to the deportation.

The crash prompted condolences from public figures and celebrities, along with vigils and tributes such as people leaving hockey sticks outside their doors. A GoFundMe crowdfunding campaign set a national record by raising more than CA$15,000,000. The crash was the deadliest road accident in Canada since the 1997 Les Éboulements bus accident, which killed 44 people.

== Background ==
Saskatchewan Highways 35 and 335 meet at a right-angle intersection near the village of Armley in the Rural Municipality of Connaught. The intersection is commonly known as "Armley Corner." Traffic on Highway 35, running north–south, has the right of way at the intersection and a speed limit of 100 km/h (62 mph). Traffic on Highway 335, both westbound and eastbound, has a speed limit of 100 km/h dropping to 60 km/h (37 mph) at the intersection, which has stop signs with flashing red lights.

The signal lights were installed after a fatal traffic collision at the same intersection in 1997, in which six members of a family from British Columbia were killed. Six memorial crosses in the intersection's southeast corner commemorate those deaths. The coroner's report on the 1997 accident suggested "additional warning device approaching Highway 35 from the west, which could include rumble strips," but this was not implemented since the last crash had occurred in 1988.

From 2011 to 2015, Saskatchewan had 13.2 traffic deaths per 100,000 people, the highest rate of any province or territory in Canada and over double the national average.

== Crash ==
According to the Royal Canadian Mounted Police (RCMP) collision report, the semi-trailer truck and the coach bus collided at the intersection of Highways 35 and 335 at about 5:00 p.m. CST on April 6, 2018. The truck, driven by Jaskirat Singh Sidhu and carrying two trailers loaded with peat, was travelling westbound on Highway 335 at between 86 and 96 km/h. The bus, carrying twenty-nine members of the Humboldt Broncos junior ice hockey team, was travelling northbound on Highway 35 around 96–107 km/h. At the intersection of Highways 35 and 335, near Armley, Highway 335 traffic faces a stop sign, which is "oversized" at 1.2 metres across, attached to a post with a blinking red light immediately above it, and placed 19 metres ahead of the intersection. Sidhu failed to heed the stop sign, while the Broncos' bus was to be given the right of way. Sidhu's truck was completely blocking the intersection when the Broncos' bus slammed into the lead trailer.

Weather on the day of the crash had been clear and sunny, and nothing obscured Sidhu's view of the stop sign, according to the agreed statement of facts. The sun was not in Sidhu's eyes, the road was not affected by any inclement weather and the intersection was clearly visible before the collision. Sidhu also passed signs indicating that an intersection with a stop sign was ahead.

Sidhu was not under the influence of drugs or alcohol and was not distracted by a cellphone. Instead, he stated that he had been distracted by a tarp that had come loose. Glen Doerksen, the Broncos' bus driver, applied his brakes 24 metres before the intersection, but was unable to avoid the collision. The bus struck the truck's front trailer in a T-bone collision. The bus sustained massive damage, particularly at the front. The driver and 13 passengers were killed immediately. Two others died of their injuries in hospital.

One of the survivors described how the bus broadsided the semi-trailer truck, which was consistent with the photographic account of the incident. A father of one of the victims stated that they "pulled up and saw the front of the bus was gone", and that the normal seating plan on the bus would have been rookies in the front, veterans in the back. Survivor Kaleb Dahlgren recounted later that the bus had the 18-year-olds up front, 19-year-olds in the middle, and the 20-year-olds in the back. The force of the impact caused both vehicles to come to rest off the highway in the northwest corner, lying on their sides.

As part of the emergency response to the crash, Shock Trauma Air Rescue Society (STARS) dispatched three helicopters to assist with transporting victims. Several of the injured were taken to the Royal University Hospital in Saskatoon, about 250 km (160 mi) southwest of the crash. The truck driver was not injured in the crash. Photos show the semi-trailer's load of peat moss was strewn over the ground. Police detained and later released the truck driver. The RCMP stated that the driver was being provided with mental health and wellness assistance. The owner of the trucking company later confirmed that the truck driver was receiving psychological support since his release.

The team chaplain Sean Brandow arrived at the scene of the crash shortly after the collision and attempted to offer prayers and aid. Officers directed families of the team towards the Nipawin Apostolic Church, where family and friends gathered to wait. One father recounted: "You're at the church and most of the families are there. All the veterans' parents start getting phone calls, we got your boy, come to the hospital. You get a little deeper and at the end of the night it's mostly the rookies parents there ... And then of course the police had the conversation with us."

=== First responders ===
Two ambulance services, Tisdale Ambulance Care from Tisdale, SK, and North East EMS from Nipawin, SK, responded initially. Ambulances from Melfort, SK, and Carrot River, SK, were also brought in to assist. Medavie Health Services West also assisted with transporting patients from the nearby hospitals. Three helicopters and four air ambulance planes were loaned from various cities and companies (Saskatchewan Air Ambulance Service) to help transport the most critically wounded to the Royal University Hospital in Saskatoon, almost 270 km (170 mi) away. Due to the number of injuries, the hospital declared a Code Orange, indicating mass casualties were en route. The Saskatchewan Health Authority, which oversees hospitals and ambulance services in the province, has encouraged employees affected to access counselling available, as many of the first responders had ties to the crash. Jessica Brost, the paramedic manager of Nipawin's North East EMS, stated that the crash was "just too close to home, especially in Saskatchewan, where everyone is either a billet, obsessed with hockey, or the parent of a teenage hockey player".

Doug Lapchuk, president of the Saskatchewan Volunteer Firefighters Association, said his organization has sent peer counsellors to help members of the Nipawin and Tisdale fire departments who were involved in removing victims from the crash. A Tisdale crane operator was called to the scene of the crash to use his crane to hoist the roof of the bus to allow first responders to reach victims underneath it. He stated concern about the "poor first responders, them guys—they were the ones getting the people out of there, they were the ones making the decisions".

An estimated 80 first responders were on scene of the crash, with resources from Tisdale, Nipawin, Zenon Park, Carrot River, Melfort, and other locations dispatched to provide aid. An eyewitness who was waiting to turn at the intersection stated that her 911 call, placed moments after the incident, was responded to 15 minutes later by police.

== Victims ==
According to the RCMP, the bus carried 29 people, including the driver. Fourteen died initially and 15 suffered injuries (three of them critically). Two of the critically injured later died in the hospital.

The RCMP stated that they would not be releasing the names of the dead until the families were notified, but the family of Broncos head coach and general manager, Darcy Haugan, confirmed on Twitter that Haugan was one of the 16 killed. Team captain Logan Schatz was also confirmed dead by his father. The bus driver, Glen Doerksen, and two radio-station employees, announcer Tyler Bieber and statistician Brody Hinz, died in the collision. Doerksen was a former board member for the Carrot River Outback Thunder hockey team, serving from 2006 to 2011 and a driver for Charlie's Charters, a Saskatchewan bus company. Four days after the crash, athletic therapist Dayna Brons, the only woman on the bus, died from head injuries sustained in the collision.

On April 8, it was discovered that one of the dead, Parker Tobin, had been misidentified by the coroner as Xavier LaBelle, who survived the crash. This was discovered after LaBelle reportedly woke up and identified himself. This prompted an apology from the coroner.

== Investigation ==
The Royal Canadian Mounted Police (RCMP) planned a news conference about the investigation into the crash. According to a statement released April 18, 2018, Assistant Commissioner Curtis Zablocki, the Commanding Officer of the Saskatchewan RCMP, would not announce any charges related to the crash. The RCMP planned to only answer general questions from the media about the collision. During the press conference, Zablocki stated that the truck driver was immediately taken into custody and released after the crash, and that the driver has been in constant contact with the RCMP. Under investigation are the engine computers for both vehicles, the drivers' logs, and the drivers' experience. It was also stated during the press conference that the truck driver was in the intersection at the time of collision, but Assistant Commissioner Zablocki said he could not comment on its speed when the crash took place.

The RCMP returned to the scene of the crash on April 19, 2018, to do additional analysis and testing with reconstructionists and officers. A police news release stated the investigators would be using vehicles similar to those involved in the collision to allow the reconstructionists to take further measurements and analyze sight lines. Previously, members of the RCMP had conducted more than 50 interviews with independent witnesses, the driver of the semi-trailer truck, the trucking company's owner, victims, and other individuals. Over 5,500 photos had been taken to document the scene and analyzed, along with imaging from 3D technology and drone usage.

Kelsey Fiddler, present at the intersection at the time of the crash, was identified as a key eyewitness. She stated in an interview she had to swing her vehicle away seconds before the crash to avoid being sandwiched by the two vehicles. Reportedly, she was waiting at the eastbound stop sign on Highway 335 to make the turn onto Highway 35 and saw the bus approaching in the northbound lane of Highway 35 at what seemed to her as "regular highway speed". Fiddler is also identified as one of the first callers to 9-1-1 in response to the crash.

== Aftermath ==
Prince Philip and I were saddened to hear word of the crash involving the Humboldt Broncos hockey team. Our thoughts and prayers are with those who have lost so much, with their families, and with all Canadians who grieve with them at this difficult time.

— Elizabeth II, Queen of Canada, April 8, 2018

Numerous dignitaries and politicians in Canada expressed their condolences after the crash, including Elizabeth II, Queen of Canada, and her husband, Prince Philip, Prime Minister Justin Trudeau, Saskatchewan premier Scott Moe, and Alberta premier Rachel Notley. US president Donald Trump phoned Trudeau and subsequently tweeted to offer his condolences to the victims and their families. Celebrities and other public figures such as Ellen DeGeneres, Drake and Whoopi Goldberg voiced their sympathy and condolences to those who were affected. Pope Francis also sent a message of condolences, which was read out by the Bishop of Saskatoon at a Sunday service two days after the accident.

The Swift Current Broncos of the Western Hockey League expressed their condolences to the Humboldt Broncos organization, players and families. A group of survivors from the Swift Current Broncos bus crash in 1986, led by Sheldon Kennedy, headed to Humboldt to offer their support to the community and hockey team.

The SJHL indefinitely suspended its playoffs immediately following the crash. The league's board of governors, which is composed of representatives from each member club, unanimously decided on April 11 to allow the two remaining teams in the play-offs (the Nipawin Hawks and Estevan Bruins) to play for the league championship. The Manitoba Junior Hockey League, the SJHL's counterpart in the neighbouring province of Manitoba, delayed its championship series by four days out of respect for the SJHL and the Broncos. The playoff champions of the two leagues later played for the ANAVET Cup regional junior championship as planned.

Humboldt schools reopened, though classes were not expected to be in session, on April 10, 2018, with crisis workers present. It was also released that the truck was from a Calgary-based company, Adesh Deol Trucking Ltd, which had been operating for only one year. Adesh Deol's safety certificate was automatically suspended due to the severity of the incident while the company was investigated by the Alberta Transportation ministry. A letter posted on Reddit and linked on Facebook, offering support and sympathy to the unidentified driver of the semi-trailer, has been widely shared.

One of the survivors, Ryan Straschnitzki, paralyzed from the waist down as a result of the accident, has told his parents he wants to continue playing sledge hockey and compete in the Paralympic Games. Similarly, Jacob Wassermann, another survivor who was paralyzed from the waist down, took up Pararowing in 2022 and made his debut with Team Canada in the single scull competition at the 2024 Summer Paralympics.

Saskatchewan Government Insurance announced on April 13, 2018, plans to improve training standards for truck drivers by 2019; at that time, no training was required to be done by certified schools.

Blood donations increased by as much as 25% in some cities in Western Canada after the crash. After the news of Logan Boulet's organ donation, 3,071 Albertans registered as organ donors in a single weekend, compared to the province's weekly average of 425. It was announced later by The Kidney Foundation of Canada that in the weeks following the crash, almost 150,000 Canadians registered as organ and tissue donors due to Boulet.

=== Vigils and tributes ===
==== League tributes ====
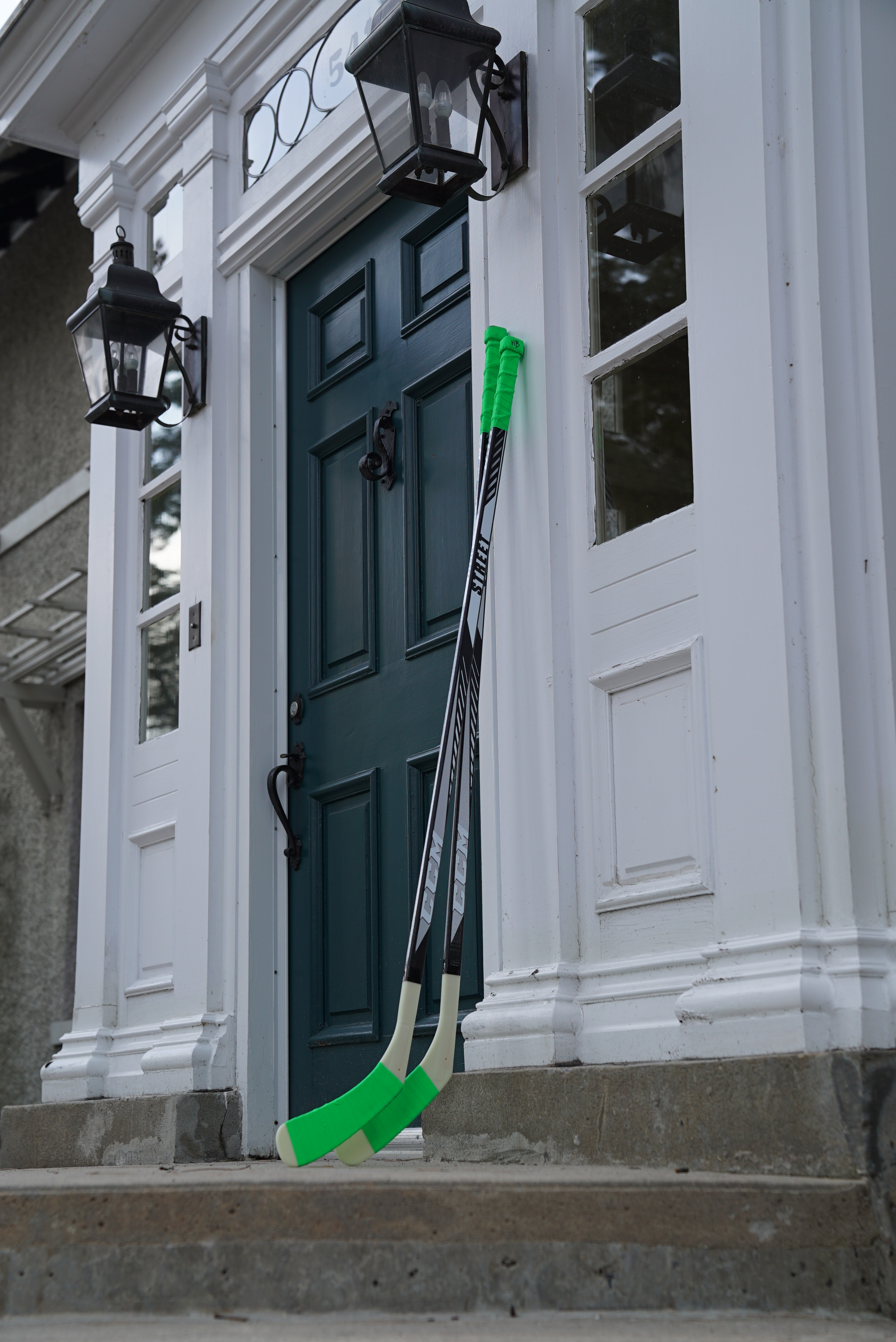
Hockey sticks left on front porches in tribute to the victims

The National Hockey League, Canadian Hockey League, American Hockey League and Canadian Junior Hockey League, and many of their respective teams and players offered tributes to the Broncos team, as did the Saskatchewan Rush of the National Lacrosse League and the Saskatchewan Roughriders Canadian football team. On April 7, in their final game of the 2017–18 regular season, players on the Winnipeg Jets and Chicago Blackhawks teams had the "Broncos" name in place of their regular name bars on the back of their jerseys in their game and stood united in a circle at centre ice during the national anthems. On that same night, the Nashville Predators played "O Canada" before their last home game and regular-season game against the Columbus Blue Jackets, despite neither team being Canadian-based. Several teams added special decals to their helmets to honour the Broncos.

On April 7, a moment of silence was observed before the NCAA college hockey championship in Minnesota. Sidney Crosby, captain of the Pittsburgh Penguins, had a special Penguins jersey with the words "BRONCOS 18", made and signed by the whole Penguins team, sent to the Broncos. The April 7 broadcast of Coach's Corner on Hockey Night in Canada focused on the incident, with Don Cherry describing it as a "national nightmare". The episode was devoted to discussing the 29 coaches, players, trainers, and media associated with the team that were on the bus, and also commented about the December 1986 Swift Current Broncos bus crash.

After eliminating the Minnesota Wild on April 20, 2018, during the first round of the 2018 Stanley Cup playoffs, the Jets displayed survivor Matthieu Gomercic, a forward for the Humboldt Broncos and Winnipeg native, on the jumbotron of Bell MTS Place, drawing a raucous standing ovation from the crowd. As the first round of the playoffs progressed, the Stanley Cup was also brought to the hospital where the injured players were to improve their spirits. Two months later, after the Washington Capitals won the Stanley Cup, Chandler Stephenson, who knew some of the people on the Broncos team, stated his intent to spend his day with the Stanley Cup in Humboldt, which he did in late August.

On June 20, 2018, 10 survivors of the crash were honoured at the 2018 NHL Awards in Las Vegas. Their late head coach Darcy Haugan won the inaugural Willie O'Ree Community Hero Award which is given to a person who has positively impacted their community, culture, or society through the game of hockey. Two days later at the 2018 NHL entry draft, the Broncos were awarded the E.J. McGuire Award of Excellence.

==== Green Shirt Day ====
Green Shirt Day is an annual event in Canada that honours the victims and families of the Humboldt Broncos bus crash, as well as promotes organ donor awareness and registration in memory of Logan Boulet, a Humboldt Broncos player who died from his injuries on April 7, 2018. His parents' decision to donate his organs inspired many Canadians to register as organ donors, leading to the largest number of organ donor registrations in Canadian history, known as the "Logan Boulet Effect."

The event encourages people to participate by wearing green, registering as an organ donor, and telling family and friends about their organ donation wishes. Green is the official colour of organ and tissue donation, symbolizing hope for patients in need. The event is also known as the "Logan Boulet Effect" and inspire Canadians to talk to their families and register as organ donors.

The event also promotes conversations about organ donation within families and communities. It is believed that for every person who registers their intent to donate, they speak with an average of four others about organ donation. This means that 100,000 new registrants equals approximately 400,000 conversations.

==== Government figures and others ====
A vigil for the victims was held on 8 April at Elgar Petersen Arena, the home of the Broncos. Prime Minister Trudeau and Saskatchewan Premier Moe attended, but did not speak. Outside the arena, the cars of those who died in the crash remained parked with white roses placed on their windshields.

On April 12, 2018, people across Canada were encouraged to wear sports sweaters and jerseys, to remember the victims in a movement known as #JerseysForHumboldt. Many Canadians and others around the world did so and Toronto Mayor John Tory proclaimed April 12 to be Jersey Day, in honour of those killed in the crash. On April 14, during game one of the series between the Toronto Raptors and Washington Wizards in the 2018 NBA playoffs, Canadian rapper Drake wore a Humboldt Broncos sweater, which he had the Raptors team sign after the game. Canadian professional golfer Brooke Henderson dedicated her win at the LPGA's Lotte Championship to the Broncos. A week after the crash, one of the teams taking part in the Saskatchewan Junior Hockey League (SJHL) championship made a stop to the scene of the crash to pay their respects, with players and coaches stating they felt stopping at the site was an important step in the grieving process.

Governor General of Canada Julie Payette visited Humboldt on October 18, 2018, where she met with the Mayor and the community, toured the Humboldt Broncos Memorial Exhibit, and watched the Broncos play the Melville Millionaires in a SJHL home game.

==== Homegrown ====
Shortly after the crash, people began leaving their hockey sticks out on their front porches as tributes to the victims. The tribute, known by the social media hashtag #PutYourSticksOut, was started after TSN Radio and former Broncos broadcaster Brian Munz received a text message from a friend urging people to leave their hockey sticks out, stating "the boys might need them ... wherever they are". The grandparents of one of the deceased initially set out to collect and display fifteen sticks but by April 12 had received 50 sticks and other memorabilia. Kingston musician Jason "Smitty" Smith posted a song about the crash on Facebook; the video shares a similar idea from the campaign and is entitled "Leave a Stick Out By the Door", which had generated over 1.3 million views by April 12, 2018. He began working on recording the song professionally and will donate the proceeds to families of the victims.

The crash location has been turned into a memorial, with Canadians from all across the country leaving flowers, candles, stuffed bears, stickers, coffee cups, wreaths, and hockey sticks. On April 14, 2018, Nipawin resident Rocky Salisbury placed 16 crosses at the crash site to memorialize the dead.

Four days after the Humboldt Broncos crash, musician Tom Cochrane appeared on Canadian sports network TSN to perform an acoustic version of his song "Big League" before hockey coverage began. He updated the lyrics to imply the players were "riding to immortality" and placed an emphasis on the unpredictability of life. Eight days later, he released a studio recording of the reworked version as a charity single, with sales proceeds directed to the Humboldt Strong Community Foundation.

At least two tattoo tributes were carried out by those connected to the crash. Two siblings and two friends of survivor Morgan Gobeil had his heartbeat measured at the hospital, tattooed onto their arms at Rites of Passage Tattoo, who also said fans were making bookings for tribute tattoos, such as of jerseys and team numbers. Mark Antonichuk, a passer-by from Moose Jaw who was one of the first on the scene, had the team's logo tattooed onto his back under the words "With You on the Scene" and above the words "With You Forever".

On April 27, 2018, a Country Thunder Humboldt Broncos tribute concert was planned. It was held in Saskatoon, and some NHL players attended. Clint Jackson, an artist associated with the Olds Mavericks, created an artwork to commemorate the victims; the piece is a set of wings encasing two hockey sticks, with the faces of the dead airbrushed in the interior. At least one survivor, Graysen Cameron, a previous Olds player, has signed the piece, and it was delivered to Humboldt by the artist.

=== Crowdfunding and aid ===
==== GoFundMe ====
A crowdfunding effort was launched by Humboldt resident Sylvie Kellington within hours of the collision to support victims and their families, and raised more than $1 million within 24 hours, and $4 million by the next day. On April 18, it reached $15,185,502, making it Canada's largest GoFundMe campaign and the second largest in the history of the site. Public discussion on the use of funds raised coincided with the Humboldt Broncos using the services of a Western Canada law firm, MLT Aikins, for assistance. The GoFundMe campaign closed on April 18, 2018, at 11:59 p.m. MST, and the Bronco's President Kevin Garinger met with the media to announce a plan for managing the donations.

Under the newly formed Humboldt Broncos Memorial Fund Inc., the funds will be disbursed through a committee that will work with the team and establish how the funds will be disbursed. After the campaign ends, the GoFundMe page will stay live to allow the team to continue to update the public on the progress of allocating the funds. At least one family of a survivor has commented on how the money should be split between the victims. The father of Ryan Straschnitzki has suggested that it be divided evenly to all 29 victims.

On May 17, the committee announced that it would begin the process of distributing the funds raised through the GoFundMe campaign. Under Saskatchewan law, money raised through a public appeal must follow regulations that include appointing a supervising judge, submitting a proposed court order for fund allocation, and recommending a timeline for the distribution. In November 2018, the committee recommended that funds were distributed almost equally among survivors and the families of the deceased. The final recommendation was for families of the deceased to receive $50,000 more than the survivors. Including $50,000 preliminary disbursements, the families of the deceased received a total of $525,000, while each survivor received $475,000. While some statements supporting an even distribution of funds were made, the committee decided against that, due to "a huge difference in emotional circumstances between most of the families who lost a loved one and most of the families who did not."

==== Other fundraisers ====
Fundraisers and donations outside of the GoFundMe will go to the Humboldt Strong Community Foundation, created with legal counsel from Robertson Stromberg LLP. The Foundation's mission will be to support the Broncos' players, employees, families, and volunteers, as well as first responders, emergency personnel, teams, athletes, organizations, and community affected by the crash and the aftermath.

The Canalta Hotel offered free rooms to family members travelling to Saskatchewan after the crash and provided food and support. Restaurants handed out free food, and servers from other restaurants in the chain of Boston Pizza came to cover the shifts of workers in Humboldt who had been friends with team members. Other groups such as STARS Air Ambulance and Ronald McDonald House, were credited by family members of those injured for providing support after the accident and during family members' recovery.

Wounded Warriors Canada have offered support for the first responders involved with the crash. An online fundraising campaign started by Wounded Warriors Canada and TEMA Conter Memorial Trust raised over $110,000 for Humboldt's first responders. Tim Hortons, a Canadian fast-food company, raised $800,000 selling yellow-and-green sprinkle doughnuts, the proceeds of which were donated to the Humboldt Broncos.

Toledo Walleye players and coaches raised $6,040 through a jersey auction during their April 13, 2018, game and then raised the donation total to $10,000 through the teams Walleye Wishing Well charity fund. Family members and friends of those injured and killed have also created their own fundraisers, such as a four-on-four hockey tournament, memorial funds for scholarship use, and medical funds.

The Atlanta Gladiators organization raised $4,200 through an auction of a stick signed by the team and the Greenville Swamp Rabbits, a game-worn Davis Vandane jersey, and a matching donation from the Gladiators for Kids foundation.

==== Scams ====
A fake GoFundMe that mimicked the initial one that benefited the entire team was discovered and reported by a Vancouver woman, who grew suspicious when she noticed the account had only $1,300 donated, while the original had over $8 million at the time. Families of those who died due to the accident discovered a website with error-filled obituaries of 11 of the 16 victims; the public could then purchase an online memorial candle or flowers, although the money would not be donated. In addition, a fake Twitter account and GoFundMe account were set up under the name of one of the more vocal injured players, Ryan Straschnitzki.

== Legal proceedings ==
=== Criminal ===
On July 6, 2018, the RCMP held a news conference to announce an arrest and charges in relation to the collision. The driver of the truck, 29-year-old Jaskirat Singh Sidhu of Calgary, was charged with 16 counts of dangerous driving causing death, and 13 counts of dangerous driving causing bodily harm. Sidhu had only one year of experience driving trucks and had only two weeks of training on the vehicle he was driving at the time of the crash. He had only been driving the vehicle on his own for two weeks when the crash occurred. He was released on $1,000 bail with a number of conditions: he was required to reside at his Calgary home, follow a curfew, be under a driving ban, and surrender his passport.

In October 2018, Sukhmander Singh, the owner of the involved trucking company Adesh Deol Trucking Ltd., was charged with violating federal and provincial safety regulations. These included two counts of failure to require a daily log, two counts of keeping multiple daily logs for a single day, three counts of failure to monitor the driver's compliance with the relevant regulation, and one count of failure to have or follow a written safety program. A court date was set for November 9. In March 2019, Singh pleaded guilty to five counts, with the logs and safety program charges having been dropped, and was fined $5,000.

On January 8, 2019, Sidhu pleaded guilty to all counts and underwent sentencing hearings in late January, hearing 90 victim impact statements. A forensic report found that he did not apply the brakes upon approaching the intersection and that his view was unobstructed, with plenty of advance warnings. On the final day of hearings, January 31, Sidhu expressed remorse and apologized. The Crown requested a 10-year prison sentence, with each count to be served concurrently, followed by a 10-year driving ban. Judge Inez Cardinal delivered her sentencing decision on March 22, 2019: concurrent sentences of 8 years. In July 2022, Sidhu was granted day parole by the Parole Board of Canada, after a hearing with some of the families of the victims in attendance. He was granted full parole in 2023.

=== Immigration ===
Sidhu was a permanent resident at the time of the crash, and a criminal conviction that carries a sentence of more than six months ordinarily makes a permanent resident ineligible to remain in the country. In 2021, a lawyer for Sidhu sent what the media described as "a voluminous amount of paperwork" to the Canada Border Services Agency arguing that Sidhu should be allowed to stay in Canada once his sentence has been served. In March 2022, the CBSA decided that Sidhu's case should be referred to the Immigration and Refugee Board of Canada (IRB), for it to decide if he should be deported. Sidhu challenged this decision at the Federal Court, with Federal Court Chief Justice Paul Crampton hearing his challenge in September 2023 and reserving the decision. In December 2023, the judge released his decision dismissing Sidhu's application and determining that his case should proceed to the IRB for it to determine whether he is inadmissible to Canada on grounds of serious criminality. That hearing took place in May 2024, at which point the IRB ordered that Sidhu be deported.

Sidhu's lawyer indicated in July 2024 that, following his IRB hearing, Sidhu made an application to be able to remain in Canada on humanitarian and compassionate grounds. Sidhu's counsel also indicated that Sidhu would make an application for a pre-removal risk assessment prior to any deportation to India, and that he would request a deferral of any deportation pending a determination of his humanitarian and compassionate application. Sidhu's lawyer stated that these legal procedures "could take months or years".

In early February 2026, the lawyer for Sidhu stated that Immigration, Refugees and Citizenship Canada rejected his pre-removal risk assessment application. On February 17, 2026, Sidhu filed for judicial review of that decision in Federal Court.

In March 2026, media reported that CBSA had asked for Sidhu's travel documents so it could begin the process of removing him from Canada. Sidhu's lawyer said he would ask CBSA to temporarily defer Sidhu's removal until his humanitarian and compassionate permanent residence application is decided, which, he says, could be another two years. His deportation was scheduled for Monday, April 27, 2026. On Friday, April 24, 2026, Federal Court Justice Jocelyne Gagné granted an emergency stay halting the removal, pending the court's hearing of Sidhu's challenge to the Canada Border Services Agency's refusal to defer his deportation while his application to remain in Canada on humanitarian and compassionate grounds is decided. Sidhu's lawyer, Michael Greene, had sought a 17-month deferral, arguing in part that Sidhu has young children, including a son born with a rare lung disorder that doctors said would be endangered by air quality in India. His lawyer said the stay could last several months while the humanitarian application is reviewed.

=== Civil ===
Seventeen lawsuits have been filed following the crash. At least one of the suits is a class action lawsuit while others are by individual or groups of families or survivors. The majority of the lawsuits list the truck driver, the Saskatchewan government, the Calgary-based government, and the bus company as defendants. An application to certify a class action in Saskatchewan was heard April 18–29, 2022 and June 13–17, 2022.

Russell and Raelene Herold, the parents of Adam Herold, filed a lawsuit on behalf of their late son. It names the truck driver, the trucking company, and the bus manufacturer, and asks for unspecified damages and court orders, including one that would require all buses carrying sports teams in Saskatchewan to have seat belts and other safety devices.

Ryan Straschnitzki, a survivor of the bus crash, filed a $13.5 million lawsuit, seeking damages against the truck and bus drivers, the trucking company, the provinces of Alberta and Saskatchewan, and several others. The lawsuit against the provinces was found to be "legally unsound" and dismissed by the court.

== Depiction in media ==
=== Book ===
A book about the team and the crash, Humble Beginnings of the Humboldt Broncos and the 2017–2018 Team, by Barry Heath was released in October 2018. Heath assembled his book from previously published materials and media interviews. The families of the players and personnel on the bus were contacted and declined to participate, and Heath proceeded without their input. After the book's release, several family members, including Logan Boulet's father, Toby, and Darcy Haugen's wife, Christina, made statements asking people not to purchase the book.

In March 2021, one of the survivors, Kaleb Dahlgren, published a memoir entitled Crossroads: My Story of Tragedy and Resilience as a Humboldt Bronco. The book memorializes the accident and the deceased victims, and also discusses his journey through his type one diabetes diagnosis and his father's medical diagnosis prior to the accident.

=== Film ===
Two television documentary films on the team's return to the ice, CBC Television's Humboldt: The New Season and TSN's 2 Roads to Humboldt, received Canadian Screen Award nominations at the 8th Canadian Screen Awards, the former for Best Documentary Program and the latter for Best Sports Feature Segment. An additional documentary, 29 Forever was created by The Sports Network and premiered on the first anniversary of the crash.

Canadian documentary news program W5 aired a segment called "The Humboldt Driver" in October 2021 which detailed the crash, included an interview with Sidhu, and examined the Canadian trucking industry. In 2025, survivor Ryan Straschnitzki debuted the television documentary series We Were Broncos, profiling his perseverance in rebuilding his life and beginning to compete in adaptive wheelchair sports, on AMI-tv.

=== Television ===
In 2026, the families of the victims and survivors raised concerns over an eight-part Netflix series which appeared to mirror the crash and its impact on the community and survivors. The news release about the show stated that it was about a bus crash that took the lives of the coach and several players of a small town in Minnesota where hockey is everything, and how the coach’s widow coaches a new team.

== Legacy ==
It was reported in July 2018 that the province of Alberta would consult the public and industry stakeholders about reforms to the province's trucking industry. Proposed changes would include mandatory training for commercial truckers and an end to the practice of allowing companies to operate on Alberta roads for 60 days before they meet safety standards.

=== Intersection improvements ===
The Saskatchewan government hired a private consulting firm to do a safety assessment of the intersection where the crash occurred, after the RCMP and Ministry of Highways finished their crash investigation. The consultants note that the existing "alignment of trees, power poles and the horizon could lead to 'tunnel vision' for drivers"; in particular a group of trees on private property, which "obstructs the view of drivers approaching from the south and east—the same directions the bus and semi-trailer were coming from when they collided". Human fatigue was also considered, since "motorists travelling Highway 335 could assume it's an uncontrolled intersection and 'overlook' the stop sign...since it's the only major intersection for more than 20 kilometres in either direction". The government said it would implement the full list of recommendations, include Highway 335 rumble strips, and widened shoulders.

=== Memorials ===
In March 2019, Logan Schatz's hometown of Allan, Saskatchewan, renamed its local arena to the Logan Schatz Memorial Arena. In October 2019, the Adams Park Ice Centre in Lethbridge, Alberta was renamed to Logan Boulet Arena.

Two memorial projects were announced to memorialize the crash and the response. A Humboldt Tribute Center is planned to be created and dedicated to the 2017-2018 team along with items and memorabilia that had been gifted to the community after the crash. At the scene of the crash a permanent memorial is to be created and was announced in 2019 and designed by the Humboldt Broncos Memorial Committee, made up of council members, Humboldt Broncos board members, families of the 2017-2018 team and the Humboldt Public Art committee.

On 2022 February 7, the International Astronomical Union named minor planet (10097) Humbroncos in memory of the tragedy, the name having been nominated by the Prince George Centre of the Royal Astronomical Society of Canada. https://www.rasc.ca/asteroid/10097

=== Team ===
In May 2018, the Humboldt Broncos took steps to be ready for the start of the next hockey season by looking to replace positions that had been lost through the accident, as well as an invitation-only camp in Saskatoon. On July 3, 2018, the team introduced Nathan Oystrick as their new head coach.

The club played their first home game of the 2018–19 season on September 12 against Nipawin, which was televised nationally by TSN, and simulcast by CTV's Saskatchewan stations, as well as NHL Network in the United States. Most of the surviving players were in attendance and following the game, the numbers of all players on the bus were formally retired by the team. For players who are still active or planned to return to the Broncos (Brayden Camrud, Derek Patter and Tyler Smith), they will retain their number while active, and they will be retired after the conclusion of their careers with the team. Despite scoring the first goal of the game, the Broncos lost the season opener by the score of 2–1.

== See also ==
- 2008 Bathurst Boys in Red accident, previously the worst bus accident involving a sports team in Canada
- Baylor Bears bus crash (1927), previously the worst sports team bus collision in North America
- List of deadliest Canadian traffic accidents
- List of accidents involving sports teams
- List of disasters in Canada by death toll
- List of traffic collisions (2000–present)
