= Rural Municipality of Willow Creek No. 458 =

Rural municipality in Saskatchewan, Canada

Willow Creek No. 458
- Rural municipality
- Rural Municipality of Willow Creek No. 458
- Location of the RM of Willow Creek No. 458 in Saskatchewan
- Coordinates: 53.060°N 104.411°W
- Country: Canada
- Province: Saskatchewan
- Census division: 14
- SARM division: 4
- Formed: December 9, 1912

Government
  - Reeve: James Arsenie
  - Governing body: RM of Willow Creek No. 458 Council
  - Administrator: Vicki Baptist
  - Office location: Brooksby

Area (2016)
  - Land: 845.18 km^{2} (326.33 sq mi)

Population (2016)
  - Total: 630
  - Density: 0.7/km^{2} (1.8/sq mi)
- Time zone: CST
  - Summer (DST): CST
- Area codes: 306 and 639

The Rural Municipality of Willow Creek No. 458 (2016 population: 630) is a rural municipality (RM) in the Canadian province of Saskatchewan within Census Division No. 14 and SARM Division No. 4.

== History ==
The RM of Willow Creek No. 458 incorporated as a rural municipality on December 9, 1912.

== Geography ==
=== Communities and localities ===
The following unincorporated communities are within the RM.

Organized hamlets

- Fairy Glen
- Gronlid

Localities

- Brooksby
- Edenbridge
- Irvington
- Ratner
- Thaxted
- Whittome

== Demographics ==
Population history (1981–2016)
Year	Pop.	±%
1981	1,218	—
1986	1,184	−2.8%
1991	1,002	−15.4%
1996	918	−8.4%
2001	818	−10.9%
2006	719	−12.1%
2011	693	−3.6%
2016	630	−9.1%
Source: Statistics Canada via Saskatchewan Bureau of Statistics

In the 2021 Census of Population conducted by Statistics Canada, the RM of Willow Creek No. 458 had a population of 683 living in 295 of its 340 total private dwellings, a change of 8.4% from its 2016 population of 630. With a land area of 838.86 km^{2} (323.89 sq mi), it had a population density of 0.8/km^{2} (2.1/sq mi) in 2021.

In the 2016 Census of Population, the RM of Willow Creek No. 458 recorded a population of 630 living in 281 of its 318 total private dwellings, a −9.1% change from its 2011 population of 693. With a land area of 845.18 km^{2} (326.33 sq mi), it had a population density of 0.7/km^{2} (1.9/sq mi) in 2016.

== Attractions ==
- Beth Israel Synagogue
- Fort à la Corne Provincial Forest
- Melfort & District Museum
- Star City Heritage Museum
- Tisdale & District Museum
- Wapiti Valley Regional Park

== Government ==
The RM of Willow Creek No. 458 is governed by an elected municipal council and an appointed administrator that meets on the second Wednesday of every month. The reeve of the RM is Gordon Garinger while its administrator is Vicki Baptist. The RM's office is located in Brooksby.

== Transportation ==
- Saskatchewan Highway 6
- Saskatchewan Highway 335
- Saskatchewan Highway 681
- Saskatchewan Highway 789
- Melfort Airport
- Tisdale Airport

== See also ==
- List of rural municipalities in Saskatchewan
