= Rural Municipality of Arborfield No. 456 =

Rural municipality in Saskatchewan, Canada

Arborfield No. 456
- Rural municipality
- Rural Municipality of Arborfield No. 456
- Location of the RM of Arborfield No. 456 in Saskatchewan
- Coordinates: 53.069°N 103.519°W
- Country: Canada
- Province: Saskatchewan
- Census division: 14
- SARM division: 4
- Formed: January 1, 1913

Government
  - Reeve: Donald Underhill
  - Governing body: RM of Arborfield No. 456 Council
  - Administrator: Pierrette Woynarski
  - Office location: Arborfield

Area (2016)
  - Land: 1,416.01 km^{2} (546.72 sq mi)

Population (2016)
  - Total: 343
  - Density: 0.2/km^{2} (0.52/sq mi)
- Time zone: CST
  - Summer (DST): CST
- Area codes: 306 and 639

The Rural Municipality of Arborfield No. 456 (2016 population: 343) is a rural municipality (RM) in the Canadian province of Saskatchewan within Census Division No. 14 and SARM Division No. 4.

== History ==
The RM of Arborfield No. 456 incorporated as a rural municipality on January 1, 1913.

== Geography ==
=== Communities and localities ===
The following urban municipalities are surrounded by the RM.

Towns

- Arborfield

Villages

- Zenon Park

The following unincorporated communities are within the RM.

Localities

- Jordan River

== Demographics ==
Population history (1981–2016)
Year	Pop.	±%
1981	692	—
1986	630	−9.0%
1991	548	−13.0%
1996	498	−9.1%
2001	484	−2.8%
2006	429	−11.4%
2011	453	+5.6%
2016	343	−24.3%
Source: Statistics Canada via Saskatchewan Bureau of Statistics

In the 2021 Census of Population conducted by Statistics Canada, the RM of Arborfield No. 456 had a population of 338 living in 143 of its 163 total private dwellings, a change of −1.5% from its 2016 population of 343. With a land area of 1,403.77 km^{2} (542.00 sq mi), it had a population density of 0.2/km^{2} (0.6/sq mi) in 2021.

In the 2016 Census of Population, the RM of Arborfield No. 456 recorded a population of 343 living in 144 of its 165 total private dwellings, a −24.3% change from its 2011 population of 453. With a land area of 1,416.01 km^{2} (546.72 sq mi), it had a population density of 0.2/km^{2} (0.6/sq mi) in 2016.

== Government ==
The RM of Arborfield No. 456 is governed by an elected municipal council and an appointed administrator that meets on the second Wednesday of every month. The reeve of the RM is Donald Underhill while its administrator is Andrea Bell. The RM's office is located in Arborfield.

== Attractions ==
- Pasquia Regional Park

== Transportation ==
Several highways and an airport service the RM. The airport is called Arborfield Airport.

The following is a list of highways and roads in the RM:

- Saskatchewan Highway 690—East west section of highway south of Jordan River
- Saskatchewan Highway 679—North South section of highway that travels north until it meets Saskatchewan Highway 23
- Saskatchewan Highway 23—Serves Arborfield
- Saskatchewan Highway 335—Meets up with Saskatchewan Highway 23

== See also ==
- List of francophone communities in Saskatchewan
- List of rural municipalities in Saskatchewan
