= Rural Municipality of Torch River No. 488 =

Rural municipality in Saskatchewan, Canada

Torch River No. 488
- Rural municipality
- Rural Municipality of Torch River No. 488
- Location of the RM of Torch River No. 488 in Saskatchewan
- Coordinates: 53.405°N 104.329°W
- Country: Canada
- Province: Saskatchewan
- Census division: 14
- SARM division: 4
- Formed: January 1, 1950

Government
  - Reeve: Jerry Kindrat
  - Governing body: RM of Torch River No. 488 Council
  - Administrator: David Yorke
  - Office location: White Fox

Area (2016)
  - Land: 5,178.9 km^{2} (1,999.6 sq mi)

Population (2016)
  - Total: 1,471
  - Density: 0.3/km^{2} (0.78/sq mi)
- Time zone: CST
  - Summer (DST): CST
- Area codes: 306 and 639

The Rural Municipality of Torch River No. 488 (2016 population: 1,471) is a rural municipality (RM) in the Canadian province of Saskatchewan within Census Division No. 14 and SARM Division No. 4. Located in the northeast-central portion of the province, it is north of the Town of Nipawin.

== History ==
The RM of Torch River No. 488 incorporated as a rural municipality on January 1, 1950.

== Geography ==
=== Communities and localities ===
The following urban municipalities are surrounded by the RM.

Towns

- Choiceland

Villages

- Love
- Smeaton
- White Fox

The following unincorporated communities are within the RM.

Organized hamlets

- Garrick
- Snowden

Localities

- Carroll Cove
- Cherry Ridge
- Claytonville
- Pruden's Point
- Shipman
- Torch River

== Demographics ==
Population history (1981–2016)
Year	Pop.	±%
1981	2,440	—
1986	2,292	−6.1%
1991	2,022	−11.8%
1996	1,827	−9.6%
2001	1,723	−5.7%
2006	1,559	−9.5%
2011	1,468	−5.8%
2016	1,471	+0.2%
Source: Statistics Canada via Saskatchewan Bureau of Statistics

In the 2021 Census of Population conducted by Statistics Canada, the RM of Torch River No. 488 had a population of 1,219 living in 543 of its 663 total private dwellings, a change of −17.1% from its 2016 population of 1,471. With a land area of 5,145.75 km^{2} (1,986.79 sq mi), it had a population density of 0.2/km^{2} (0.6/sq mi) in 2021.

In the 2016 Census of Population, the RM of Torch River No. 488 recorded a population of 1,471 living in 622 of its 740 total private dwellings, a 0.2% change from its 2011 population of 1,468. With a land area of 5,178.9 km^{2} (1,999.6 sq mi), it had a population density of 0.3/km^{2} (0.7/sq mi) in 2016.

== Government ==
The RM of Torch River No. 488 is governed by an elected municipal council and an appointed administrator that meets on the second Monday of every month. The reeve of the RM is Jerry Kindrat while its administrator is David Yorke. The RM's office is located in White Fox.

== Transportation ==
- Highway 35—serves White Fox
- Highway 55—serves White Fox, Garrick, Choiceland, Smeaton and Shipman
- Highway 6—serves Choiceland
- Highway 691—serves Snowden
- Highway 106—serves Smeaton
- Highway 790 --

== See also ==
- List of rural municipalities in Saskatchewan
