= Rural Municipality of Star City No. 428 =

Rural municipality in Saskatchewan, Canada

Star City No. 428
- Rural municipality
- Rural Municipality of Star City No. 428
- Location of the RM of Star City No. 428 in Saskatchewan
- Coordinates: 52.800°N 104.418°W
- Country: Canada
- Province: Saskatchewan
- Census division: 14
- SARM division: 4
- Formed: January 1, 1913

Government
  - Reeve: Robert Miller
  - Governing body: RM of Star City No. 428 Council
  - Administrator: Levina Cronk
  - Office location: Star City

Area (2016)
  - Land: 824.85 km^{2} (318.48 sq mi)

Population (2016)
  - Total: 918
  - Density: 1.1/km^{2} (2.8/sq mi)
- Time zone: CST
  - Summer (DST): CST
- Area codes: 306 and 639

The Rural Municipality of Star City No. 428 (2016 population: 918) is a rural municipality (RM) in the Canadian province of Saskatchewan within Census Division No. 14 and SARM Division No. 4.

== History ==
The RM of Star City No. 428 incorporated as a rural municipality on January 1, 1913.

== Geography ==
=== Communities and localities ===
The following urban municipalities are surrounded by the RM.

Cities

- Melfort

Towns

- Star City

Villages

- Valparaiso

The following unincorporated communities are within the RM.

Localities

- Clements
- Naisberry
- Resource
- South Star

== Demographics ==
Population history (1981–2016)
Year	Pop.	±%
1981	1,185	—
1986	1,161	−2.0%
1991	1,081	−6.9%
1996	1,052	−2.7%
2001	1,011	−3.9%
2006	936	−7.4%
2011	911	−2.7%
2016	918	+0.8%
Source: Statistics Canada via Saskatchewan Bureau of Statistics

In the 2021 Census of Population conducted by Statistics Canada, the RM of Star City No. 428 had a population of 811 living in 302 of its 314 total private dwellings, a change of −11.7% from its 2016 population of 918. With a land area of 822.81 km^{2} (317.69 sq mi), it had a population density of 1.0/km^{2} (2.6/sq mi) in 2021.

In the 2016 Census of Population, the RM of Star City No. 428 recorded a population of 918 living in 315 of its 331 total private dwellings, a 0.8% change from its 2011 population of 911. With a land area of 824.85 km^{2} (318.48 sq mi), it had a population density of 1.1/km^{2} (2.9/sq mi) in 2016.

== Attractions ==
- Star City Heritage Museum
- Melfort & District Regional Park

== Government ==
The RM of Star City No. 428 is governed by an elected municipal council and an appointed administrator that meets on the second Tuesday of every month. The reeve of the RM is Robert Miller while its administrator is Levina Cronk. The RM's office is located in Star City.

== Transportation ==
- Saskatchewan Highway 3
- Saskatchewan Highway 6
- Saskatchewan Highway 681
- Saskatchewan Highway 776

== See also ==
- List of rural municipalities in Saskatchewan
