= Division No. 14, Saskatchewan =

Census division in Canada

Coordinates: 53°16′48″N 103°34′48″W

Division No. 14
- Census division in Saskatchewan
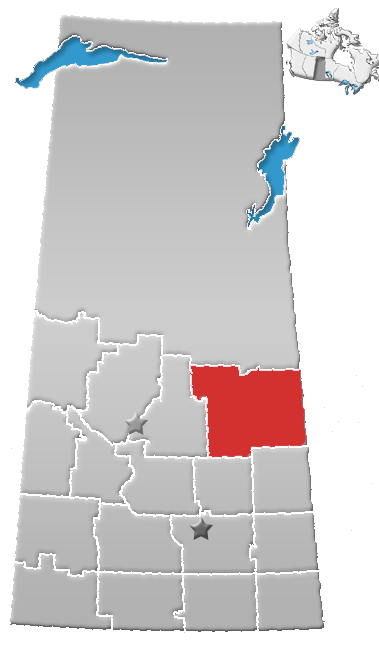
- Country: Canada
- Province: Saskatchewan

Area
  - Total: 33,821.12 km^{2} (13,058.41 sq mi)
- As of 2016

Population (2016)
  - Total: 36,096
  - Density: 1.0673/km^{2} (2.7642/sq mi)

Division No. 14 is one of eighteen census divisions in the province of Saskatchewan, Canada, as defined by Statistics Canada. It is located on the northern portion of Southeast Saskatchewan, bordering Manitoba. The most populous community in this division is the city of Melfort. Other important communities are the towns of Nipawin and Tisdale.

== Demographics ==
In the 2021 Census of Population conducted by Statistics Canada, Division No. 14 had a population of 35,428 living in 14,968 of its 18,070 total private dwellings, a change of −1.9% from its 2016 population of 36,096. With a land area of 33,676.06 km^{2} (13,002.40 sq mi), it had a population density of 1.1/km^{2} (2.7/sq mi) in 2021.

== Census subdivisions ==
The following census subdivisions (municipalities or municipal equivalents) are located within Saskatchewan's Division No. 14.

=== Cities ===
- Melfort

=== Towns ===
- Arborfield
- Carrot River
- Choiceland
- Hudson Bay
- Kelvington
- Naicam
- Nipawin
- Porcupine Plain
- Rose Valley
- Star City
- Tisdale

=== Villages ===
- Archerwill
- Aylsham
- Bjorkdale
- Codette
- Fosston
- Love
- Mistatim
- Pleasantdale
- Ridgedale
- Smeaton
- Spalding
- Valparaiso
- Weekes
- White Fox
- Zenon Park

=== Resort villages ===
- Tobin Lake

=== Rural municipalities ===
- RM No. 366 Kelvington
- RM No. 367 Ponass Lake
- RM No. 368 Spalding
- RM No. 394 Hudson Bay
- RM No. 395 Porcupine
- RM No. 397 Barrier Valley
- RM No. 398 Pleasantdale
- RM No. 426 Bjorkdale
- RM No. 427 Tisdale
- RM No. 428 Star City
- RM No. 456 Arborfield
- RM No. 457 Connaught
- RM No. 458 Willow Creek
- RM No. 486 Moose Range
- RM No. 487 Nipawin
- RM No. 488 Torch River

=== Indian reserves ===
- Carrot River 29A
- Kinistin 91
- Opaskwayak Cree Nation 27A (formerly Carrot River 27A)
- Red Earth 29
- Shoal Lake 28A
- Yellow Quill 90

== See also ==
- List of census divisions of Saskatchewan
- List of communities in Saskatchewan
