= SARM Division No. 4 =

Division in Saskatchewan, Canada

SARM Division No. 4 is a division of the Saskatchewan Association of Rural Municipalities (SARM) within the Canadian province of Saskatchewan. It is located in the north-east area of the province. There are 43 rural municipalities in this division. The current director for Division 4 is Myron Kopec.

== List of RMs in SARM Division No. 4 ==
By numerical RM No.

- RM No. 241 Calder
- RM No. 243 Wallace
- RM No. 244 Orkney
- RM No. 245 Garry
- RM No. 246 Ituna Bon Accord
- RM No. 247 Kellross
- RM No. 248 Touchwood
- RM No. 271 Cote
- RM No. 273 Sliding Hills
- RM No. 274 Good Lake
- RM No. 275 Insinger
- RM No. 276 Foam Lake
- RM No. 277 Emerald
- RM No. 278 Kutawa
- RM No. 301 St. Philips
- RM No. 303 Keys
- RM No. 304 Buchanan
- RM No. 305 Invermay
- RM No. 307 Elfros
- RM No. 308 Big Quill
- RM No. 331 Livingston
- RM No. 333 Clayton
- RM No. 334 Preeceville
- RM No. 335 Hazel Dell
- RM No. 336 Sasman
- RM No. 337 Lakeview
- RM No. 338 Lakeside
- RM No. 366 Kelvington
- RM No. 367 Ponass Lake
- RM No. 368 Spalding
- RM No. 394 Hudson Bay
- RM No. 395 Porcupine
- RM No. 397 Barrier Valley
- RM No. 398 Pleasantdale
- RM No. 426 Bjorkdale
- RM No. 427 Tisdale
- RM No. 428 Star City
- RM No. 456 Arborfield
- RM No. 457 Connaught
- RM No. 458 Willow Creek
- RM No. 486 Moose Range
- RM No. 487 Nipawin
- RM No. 488 Torch River

== See also ==
- List of regions of Saskatchewan
- List of census divisions of Saskatchewan
- List of communities in Saskatchewan
- Geography of Saskatchewan
