= Rural Municipality of Spalding No. 368 =

Rural municipality in Saskatchewan, Canada

Spalding No. 368
- Rural municipality
- Rural Municipality of Spalding No. 368
- Location of the RM of Spalding No. 368 in Saskatchewan
- Coordinates: 52.302°N 104.387°W
- Country: Canada
- Province: Saskatchewan
- Census division: 14
- SARM division: 4
- Formed: December 11, 1911

Government
  - Reeve: Eugene Eggerman
  - Governing body: RM of Spalding No. 368 Council
  - Administrator: Cathy Holt
  - Office location: Spalding

Area (2016)
  - Land: 811.47 km^{2} (313.31 sq mi)

Population (2016)
  - Total: 453
  - Density: 0.6/km^{2} (1.6/sq mi)
- Time zone: CST
  - Summer (DST): CST
- Area codes: 306 and 639

The Rural Municipality of Spalding No. 368 (2016 population: 453) is a rural municipality (RM) in the Canadian province of Saskatchewan within Census Division No. 14 and SARM Division No. 4.

== History ==
The RM of Spalding No. 368 incorporated as a rural municipality on December 11, 1911.

Heritage properties

St. Michael's Anglican Church (dedicated on May 17, 1909) and its associated cemetery is located 20 kilometres southeast of Daphne within the RM. The church was in active service until 1943.

== Demographics ==
Population history (1981–2016)
Year	Pop.	±%
1981	955	—
1986	869	−9.0%
1991	768	−11.6%
1996	681	−11.3%
2001	612	−10.1%
2006	425	−30.6%
2011	447	+5.2%
2016	453	+1.3%
Source: Statistics Canada via Saskatchewan Bureau of Statistics

In the 2021 Census of Population conducted by Statistics Canada, the RM of Spalding No. 368 had a population of 420 living in 172 of its 197 total private dwellings, a change of −7.3% from its 2016 population of 453. With a land area of 811.15 km^{2} (313.19 sq mi), it had a population density of 0.5/km^{2} (1.3/sq mi) in 2021.

In the 2016 Census of Population, the RM of Spalding No. 368 recorded a population of 453 living in 192 of its 230 total private dwellings, a 1.3% change from its 2011 population of 447. With a land area of 811.47 km^{2} (313.31 sq mi), it had a population density of 0.6/km^{2} (1.4/sq mi) in 2016.

== Economy ==
The economy of the RM is predominantly agricultural.

== Government ==
The RM of Spalding No. 368 is governed by an elected municipal council and an appointed administrator that meets on the first Wednesday of every month. The reeve of the RM is Eugene Eggerman while its administrator is Cathy Holt. The RM's office is located in Spalding.

== See also ==
- List of rural municipalities in Saskatchewan
