= Fosston, Saskatchewan =

Village in Saskatchewan, Canada

Fosston
- Village
- Village of Fosston
- Motto: Catch The Fosston Feeling
- Location of Fosston in Saskatchewan Fosston (Canada)
- Coordinates: 52.206°N 103.830°W
- Country: Canada
- Province: Saskatchewan
- Region: East-central
- Census division: 14
- Rural municipality: Ponass Lake No. 367
- Post office Founded: 1908
- Incorporated (Village): 1964

Government
  - Type: Municipal
  - Governing body: Fosston Village Council
  - Mayor: William Dyck
  - Administrator: Valerie Bjerland
  - Federal Electoral District of Yorkton—Melville MP: Cathay Wagantall (2015)
  - Provincial Constituency of Kelvington-Wadena MLA: June Draude (2007)

Area
  - Total: 0.59 km^{2} (0.23 sq mi)

Population (2016)
  - Total: 45
  - Density: 76.8/km^{2} (199/sq mi)
- Time zone: UTC-6 (CST)
- Postal code: S0E 0V0
- Area code: 306
- Highways: Highway 35; Highway 760

Fosston (2016 population: 45) is a village in the Canadian province of Saskatchewan within the Rural Municipality of Ponass Lake No. 367 and Census Division No. 14. The village was named after Fosston, Minnesota, the original home of five Rustad brothers, who homesteaded there.

== History ==
Fosston incorporated as a village on January 1, 1965.

== Demographics ==
Population history (1981–2016)
Year	Pop.	±%
1981	105	—
1986	94	−10.5%
1991	87	−7.4%
1996	85	−2.3%
2001	55	−35.3%
2006	55	+0.0%
2011	55	+0.0%
2016	45	−18.2%
Source: Statistics Canada via Saskatchewan Bureau of Statistics

In the 2021 Census of Population conducted by Statistics Canada, Fosston had a population of 40 living in 22 of its 29 total private dwellings, a change of −11.1% from its 2016 population of 45. With a land area of 0.54 km^{2} (0.21 sq mi), it had a population density of 74.1/km^{2} (191.9/sq mi) in 2021.

In the 2016 Census of Population, the Village of Fosston recorded a population of 45 living in 24 of its 35 total private dwellings, a −22.2% change from its 2011 population of 55. With a land area of 0.59 km^{2} (0.23 sq mi), it had a population density of 76.3/km^{2} (197.5/sq mi) in 2016.

== See also ==
- List of communities in Saskatchewan
- List of villages in Saskatchewan
