= Fairy Glen =

Community in Saskatchewan, Canada

- Interactive map of Fairy Glen
- Coordinates: 53°01′59″N 104°32′26″W
- Country: Canada
- Province: Saskatchewan
- Rural municipality: Rural Municipality of Willow Creek No. 458

Area (2021)
  - Land: 0.27 km^{2} (0.10 sq mi)

Population (2021)
  - Total: 37
  - Density: 137/km^{2} (350/sq mi)
- Area codes: 306 and 639

Fairy Glen is an organized hamlet in the Rural Municipality of Willow Creek No. 458 in the Canadian province of Saskatchewan. It is situated on the banks of the Carrot River and access is from Highway 6.

== Demographics ==
In the 2021 Census of Population conducted by Statistics Canada, Fairy Glen had a population of 37 living in 17 of its 17 total private dwellings, a change of 23.3% from its 2016 population of 30. With a land area of 0.27 km^{2} (0.10 sq mi), it had a population density of 137.0/km^{2} (354.9/sq mi) in 2021.

== See also ==
- List of communities in Saskatchewan
