= Armley, Saskatchewan =

Community in Saskatchewan, Canada

Armley
- Unincorporated community
- Location within Saskatchewan Location within Canada
- Coordinates: 53.117°N 104.034°W
- Country: Canada
- Province: Saskatchewan
- Region: Central
- Census division: 14
- Rural municipality: Connaught No. 457

Government
  - Reeve: Ian Boxall
  - Administrator: Jaime Orr
  - Governing body: Cannaught No. 457

Area
  - Total: 0.00 km^{2} (0 sq mi)
  - Density: 0/km^{2} (0/sq mi)
- Time zone: CST
- Postal code: S0E 1T0
- Area code: 306
- Highways: Highway 3 Highway 35
- Railways: Canadian Pacific Railway

Armley is an unincorporated community in the Rural Municipality of Connaught No. 457, Saskatchewan, Canada. Approximately halfway between Tisdale and Nipawin, northwest of the intersection of Highway 35 and Highway 335. Armley was the site of the Humboldt Broncos bus crash, killing 16 hockey players and personnel from a team in the city of Humboldt.

== History ==
Coming into existence in the early 1900s as the farming region was settled, Armley reached its peak during the 1920s with the arrival of the Canadian Pacific Railway in 1924.

With the decline in the rural population of Saskatchewan and the consolidation of businesses and services in larger centres, the townsite now only contains a local community hall and a handful of houses. The former general store, church, post office, hotel and grain elevators are no longer in operation.

== See also ==
- List of communities in Saskatchewan
