= Rural Municipality of Bjorkdale No. 426 =

Rural municipality in Saskatchewan, Canada

Bjorkdale No. 426
- Rural municipality
- Rural Municipality of Bjorkdale No. 426
- Location of the RM of Bjorkdale No. 426 in Saskatchewan
- Coordinates: 52.678°N 103.514°W
- Country: Canada
- Province: Saskatchewan
- Census division: 14
- SARM division: 4
- Formed: January 1, 1913

Government
  - Reeve: Glen Clarke
  - Governing body: RM of Bjorkdale No. 426 Council
  - Administrator: Cherie Hudon
  - Office location: Bjorkdale

Area (2016)
  - Land: 1,460.5 km^{2} (563.9 sq mi)

Population (2016)
  - Total: 851
  - Density: 0.6/km^{2} (1.6/sq mi)
- Time zone: CST
  - Summer (DST): CST
- Area codes: 306 and 639

The Rural Municipality of Bjorkdale No. 426 (2016 population: 851) is a rural municipality (RM) in the Canadian province of Saskatchewan within Census Division No. 14 and SARM Division No. 4.

== History ==
The RM of Bjorkdale No. 426 incorporated as a rural municipality on January 1, 1913.

== Geography ==
=== Communities and localities ===
The following urban municipalities are surrounded by the RM.

Villages

- Bjorkdale
- Mistatim

The following unincorporated communities are located within the RM.

Organized hamlets

- Barrier Ford
- Chelan

Localities

- Crooked River
- Marean Lake Resort
- Merle
- Orley
- Peesane
- Pré-Ste-Marié
- Steen

== Demographics ==
Population history (1981–2016)
Year	Pop.	±%
1981	1,477	—
1986	1,387	−6.1%
1991	1,253	−9.7%
1996	1,111	−11.3%
2001	1,041	−6.3%
2006	997	−4.2%
2011	900	−9.7%
2016	851	−5.4%
Source: Statistics Canada via Saskatchewan Bureau of Statistics

In the 2021 Census of Population conducted by Statistics Canada, the RM of Bjorkdale No. 426 had a population of 906 living in 437 of its 1,009 total private dwellings, a change of 6.5% from its 2016 population of 851. With a land area of 1,438.66 km^{2} (555.47 sq mi), it had a population density of 0.6/km^{2} (1.6/sq mi) in 2021.

In the 2016 Census of Population, the RM of Bjorkdale No. 426 recorded a population of 851 living in 375 of its 1,046 total private dwellings, a −5.4% change from its 2011 population of 900. With a land area of 1,460.5 km^{2} (563.9 sq mi), it had a population density of 0.6/km^{2} (1.5/sq mi) in 2016.

== Government ==
The RM of Bjorkdale No. 426 is governed by an elected municipal council and an appointed administrator that meets on the first Wednesday of every month. The reeve of the RM is Glen Clarke while its administrator is Cherie Hudon. The RM's office is located in Bjorkdale.

== See also ==
- List of rural municipalities in Saskatchewan
