= Mistatim =

Village in Saskatchewan, Canada

Mistatim Cree: "Big Dog"
- Village
- Motto: Proud of its Past ..... Planning for its Future.
- Location of Mistatim in Saskatchewan Mistatim (Canada)
- Coordinates: 52°52′19″N 103°21′56″W
- Country: Canada
- Province: Saskatchewan
- Region: East-central
- Census division: 14
- Rural municipality: Bjorkdale No. 426
- Post office Founded: 1907

Government
  - Mayor: Patrick Potie
  - Administrator: Cathy Murray
  - Governing body: Mistatim Village Council

Area
  - Total: 0.47 km^{2} (0.18 sq mi)

Population (2011)
  - Total: 73
  - Density: 155/km^{2} (400/sq mi)
- Time zone: CST
- Postal code: S0E 1B0
- Area code: 306
- Highways: Highway 3

Mistatim (2016 population: 101) is a village in the Canadian province of Saskatchewan within the Rural Municipality of Bjorkdale No. 426 and Census Division No. 14. It is just north of Highway 3. Mistatim is 56 kilometres (35 mi) east of the town of Tisdale and 64 kilometres (40 mi) west of Hudson Bay. The Greenwater Lake Provincial Park is 48 kilometres (30 mi) to the south.

The Mistatim post office first opened in 1907 and closed down in 1914, to re-open in 1917. Mistatim Station post office was established in 1930, with a change of name to Mistatim in 1938. The early village was a settlement of Germans, Hungarians, French and Scots. Early surveying and settlement in the area was difficult in this heavily forested area without roads, and several muskeg areas could not be crossed until winter freeze up. Mistatim is located south of the Pasquia Forest Reserve, and north of the Porcupine Forest Reserve. The Cree word Mistatim literally translates to big dog, in reference to horses.

== History ==
Mistatim incorporated as a village on July 1, 1952.

== Demographics ==
Population history (1981–2016)
| Year | Pop. | ±% |
|---|---|---|
| 1981 | 132 | — |
| 1986 | 158 | +19.7% |
| 1991 | 114 | −27.8% |
| 1996 | 114 | +0.0% |
| 2001 | 104 | −8.8% |
| 2006 | 89 | −14.4% |
| 2011 | 73 | −18.0% |
| 2016 | 101 | +38.4% |
Source: Statistics Canada via Saskatchewan Bureau of Statistics

In the 2021 Census of Population conducted by Statistics Canada, Mistatim had a population of 30 living in 16 of its 20 total private dwellings, a change of −70.3% from its 2016 population of 101. With a land area of 0.51 km^{2} (0.20 sq mi), it had a population density of 58.8/km^{2} (152.4/sq mi) in 2021.

In the 2016 Census of Population, the Village of Mistatim recorded a population of 101 living in 45 of its 48 total private dwellings, a 27.7% change from its 2011 population of 73. With a land area of 0.47 km^{2} (0.18 sq mi), it had a population density of 214.9/km^{2} (556.6/sq mi) in 2016.

== Transportation ==
As early as April 2, 1905, Mistatim Siding was located at SW 1/4 Section 15, Township 45, Range 10 West of the 2nd Meridian on the CNR railway. Mistatim was located on the Neepawa – Dauphin – Hudson Bay Junction – The Pas – Prince Albert – North Battleford CNR Branch Line. Mistatim was a station located at mile 436 between Bannock and Peesane. Passenger service via the CNR stopped in 1977. The Shaw railway was a private railway about 30 miles (48 km) long providing logging transportation. Access to Mistatim is via Highway 3.

== Economy ==
Mistatim is a member of the EDEN Regional Economic Development Authority (REDA) which was formed in 1995. This REDA is one of 31 in the province which organise together municipal governments, businesses, and co-ops to encourage tourism, investment, economic and recreational activities in the area. Located south of the tree line in the province of Saskatchewan, Mistatim is home to both agricultural mixed farming and forestry as an economic base. The Mistatim cemetery is located at SE Section 15- Township 45- Range 10 West of the 2nd Meridian. The first burial was in 1936, and by 1999, there have been transcribed 211 burials.

== Features and attractions ==
Besides Greenwater Lake Provincial Park, there are several neighbouring lakes which are stocked with fish. Deer, elk or moose hunting as well as duck hunting are activities in this heavily forested area. The Mistatim bog situated in the southern boreal forest, features black spruce, moose and waterfowl. This bog / fen area is protected under the Wildlife Habitat Protection Act. A unique new feature in the Mistatim region is the Mistatim Castle. This two storey home constructed above a three car garage with duck pond is within a mile of the village. The provincial government was petitioned in 2002 to encourage the Saskatchewan Snowmobile Association to provide groomed snowmobile trails in the area and the Mistatim Snow Packers Inc. has been established. The Mistatim Arena was constructed as a part of the Canadian centennial project in 1967, and features ice rink and curling rink.

== Education ==
The Mistatim public library is part of the regional Wapiti Regional Library. In 1929, a log school house was constructed on the site of the Mistatim school, and this log school building was demolished in 1940. Bachelor School District 5009 was first established in 1932. In 1939 a new teacherage was constructed as well as a two-room school was finished. This school was demolished in 1961, to be replaced by a modern school with a new gymnasium added in 1977. The former school building, which offered Kindergarten to grade 12, closed in 2001 and has been converted into a community center. Deldale School District #5171 was constructed in 1939. To the east of Deldale, the Bannock School District #5190 was established in 1941.Frederick's Siding School, and Motion School were two other one room school houses in the area.

== See also ==
- List of communities in Saskatchewan
- List of villages in Saskatchewan
