= CKZP-FM =

Radio station in Zenon Park, Saskatchewan, Canada

Coordinates: 53.0653°N 103.7583°W

CKZP-FM is a community radio station that operates at 102.7 FM in Zenon Park, Saskatchewan, Canada.

CKZP's programming features music, discussions, news, community announcements, local hockey games, special events and religious services. The station broadcasts in both French and English.

The Canadian Radio-television and Telecommunications Commission approved CKZP on October 23, 2002.
