= Rural Municipality of Sliding Hills No. 273 =

Rural municipality in Saskatchewan, Canada

Sliding Hills No. 273
- Rural municipality
- Rural Municipality of Sliding Hills No. 273
- Location of the RM of Sliding Hills No. 273 in Saskatchewan
- Coordinates: 51.519°N 102.218°W
- Country: Canada
- Province: Saskatchewan
- Census division: 9
- SARM division: 4
- Formed: January 1, 1913

Government
  - Reeve: Harvey Malanowich
  - Governing body: RM of Sliding Hills No. 273 Council
  - Administrator: Todd Steele
  - Office location: Mikado

Area (2016)
  - Land: 855.28 km^{2} (330.23 sq mi)

Population (2016)
  - Total: 421
  - Density: 0.5/km^{2} (1.3/sq mi)
- Time zone: CST
  - Summer (DST): CST
- Area codes: 306 and 639

The Rural Municipality of Sliding Hills No. 273 (2016 population: 421) is a rural municipality (RM) in the Canadian province of Saskatchewan within Census Division No. 9 and SARM Division No. 4.

== History ==
The RM of Sliding Hills No. 273 incorporated as a rural municipality on January 1, 1913.

Heritage properties

There are three historical buildings located within the RM.

- Greek Catholic Church of Transfiguration (also called the Dneiper Catholic Church) - Constructed in 1931 in a Byzantine cruciform style. The church is of historic significance within the community.
- Holy Assumption St. Mary’s Ukrainian Orthodox Church (also called Holy Assumption of St. Mary and the Boychuk Church) - Constructed in 1902 and officially opened in 1927, the church still hosts an annual service attended by descendants of early immigrants to the area.
- St. Michael’s Ukrainian Orthodox Church - Constructed in 1924, the church includes a separate bell tower and is of historical significance in the community.

== Demographics ==
Population history (1981–2016)
Year	Pop.	±%
1981	1,042	—
1986	957	−8.2%
1991	784	−18.1%
1996	650	−17.1%
2001	565	−13.1%
2006	462	−18.2%
2011	520	+12.6%
2016	421	−19.0%
Source: Statistics Canada via Saskatchewan Bureau of Statistics

In the 2021 Census of Population conducted by Statistics Canada, the RM of Sliding Hills No. 273 had a population of 438 living in 194 of its 264 total private dwellings, a change of 4% from its 2016 population of 421. With a land area of 820.7 km^{2} (316.9 sq mi), it had a population density of 0.5/km^{2} (1.4/sq mi) in 2021.

In the 2016 Census of Population, the RM of Sliding Hills No. 273 recorded a population of 421 living in 191 of its 267 total private dwellings, a −19% change from its 2011 population of 520. With a land area of 855.28 km^{2} (330.23 sq mi), it had a population density of 0.5/km^{2} (1.3/sq mi) in 2016.

== Government ==
The RM of Sliding Hills No. 273 is governed by an elected municipal council and an appointed administrator that meets on the second Monday of every month. The reeve of the RM is Harvey Malanowich while its administrator is Todd Steele. The RM's office is located in Mikado.

== Transportation ==
Passenger rail service is provided to the RM by Via Rail at Mikado station.

== See also ==
- List of rural municipalities in Saskatchewan
