= Arborfield, Saskatchewan =

Town in Saskatchewan, Canada

Arborfield
- Town
- Location of Arborfield in Saskatchewan Arborfield (Canada)
- Coordinates: 53.06°N 103.39°W
- Country: Canada
- Province: Saskatchewan
- Census division: 14
- Rural municipality: Arborfield No. 456
- Post Office: 1910

Government
  - Mayor: Chet Edwards
  - Aldermen: Bobby Doerksen, Wendy Ralph, Helen Soucy, Devin Vineyard
  - Town Administrator: Andrea Bell

Area
  - Total: 0.88 km^{2} (0.34 sq mi)

Population (2011)
  - Total: 326
- Time zone: CST
- Postal code: S0E 0A0
- Area code: 306
- Climate: Dfb
- Highways: Highway 23
- Website: Official Website

Arborfield (2006 Population 329) is a town in east-central Saskatchewan, Canada, approximately 70 kilometres (43 mi) north-east of Melfort. The town is located on Highway 23 14 kilometres (8.7 mi) west of the Pasquia Hills. Arborfield is approximately 54 kilometres (34 mi) from Nipawin, 53 kilometres (33 mi) from Tisdale, 266 kilometres (165 mi) from Saskatoon, and 196 kilometres (122 mi) from Prince Albert.

== History ==
In 1910, the town requested that it be named Fairfield, but that name was rejected by the post office in Ottawa. Because the offer was received on Arbour Day, the Post Office asked if the residents would accept Arborfield, which it did. As well, the town may have been named for Arborfield, England, the site of an engineering museum.

== Demographics ==
In the 2021 Census of Population conducted by Statistics Canada, Arborfield had a population of 285 living in 122 of its 139 total private dwellings, a change of −8.7% from its 2016 population of 312. With a land area of 0.87 km^{2} (0.34 sq mi), it had a population density of 327.6/km^{2} (848.4/sq mi) in 2021.

Canada census – Arborfield community profile

	2021	2011
Population	285 (-8.7% from 2016)	326 (-0.9% from 2006)
Land area	0.87 km^{2} (0.34 sq mi)	0.88 km^{2} (0.34 sq mi)
Population density	326.2/km^{2} (845/sq mi)	370.5/km^{2} (960/sq mi)
Median age	57.6 (M: 54.0, F: 59.2)	51.4 (M: 50.9, F: 52.5)
Private dwellings	139 (total) 122 (occupied)	156 (total)
Median household income

References: 2021 2011

== Education ==
Arborfield School is part of the North East School Division No. 200.

=== School's history ===
On 13 October 1910, community settlers in the area met and formed the Arborfield School District No. 2785. The first school board borrowed $1,000 to build the first school in 1911. Many more schools were built and added to the area until 10 March 1930, when a group of local citizens held a meeting to request the formation of another school district. On 11 April 1930, the Department of Education informed the group that the Treasure School District No. 4864 had been erected.

A few years later the name "Treasure" was changed to Arborfield. This was the result of a switching of name titles between two existing school districts - the former "Arborfield" School District (located South of the town) then took the name of "Treasure". The first two-room school was built in the school's present location in 1930–1931. A fire destroyed the original structure in 1947. In 1948 a new six-room school was built.

In 1950, Arborfield S.D. became part of the Tisdale School Unit No. 53. There were many rooms added throughout the years until 1965 when the south / west wing was added – which is now utilised for secondary school instruction.

The 1980s saw other additions such as the building of a gymnasium and shower rooms, introduction of a computer lab and an Industrial Arts Shop.

In 2010, the school consisted of 7 classrooms for Kindergarten to Grade 12, Industrial Arts Shop, Home Ec. Room, science Lab, gymnasium, tuck shop, pre-school room, weight room, library, Windows and Linux computer labs, among other multiuse and utility rooms.

=== Extra-curricular activities ===
Arborfield School logo

The school offers various organized extra-curricular activities for the students, including drama and dinner theatre, Elementary Christmas concert, Christmas Dinner with community seniors, delivering meals on wheels, SRC, newsletter committee, Science fair, Arts festival, and high school curling bonspiel. Commercial music instruction is also delivered at the school throughout the year. Sports teams go by the name Arborfield Blues with a mascot of the wolf.

== Transportation ==
Arborfield is located on Highway 23. Highways 335 and 690 are nearby and also service the community.

North-east of Arborfield is Arborfield Airport.

== Clubs and organizations ==
- Arborfield Elks Lodge #319
- Jordan River Community Club
- Masons
- Arborfield Health Care
- Royal Canadian Legion
- Hall Committee
- Arborfield School Community Council
- Seniors Group

== Recreation ==
- Arborfield Curling Club
- Arborfield Skating Rink
- Arborfield Figure Skating Club
- Arborfield Minor Ball
- Arborfield Softball

== See also ==
- List of communities in Saskatchewan
- List of francophone communities in Saskatchewan
- List of towns in Saskatchewan
- Thunder Rail Ltd.
