= White Fox, Saskatchewan =

Village in Saskatchewan, Canada

Village of White Fox
- Village
- Location of White Fox in Saskatchewan
- Coordinates: 53.449262°N 104.085685°W
- Country: Canada
- Province: Saskatchewan
- Region: Saskatchewan
- Census division: No. 14

Government
  - Mayor: Brian Lane

Area
  - Total: 0.85 km^{2} (0.33 sq mi)

Population (2011)
  - Total: 364
  - Density: 427/km^{2} (1,110/sq mi)
- Time zone: CST
- Postal code: S0J 3B0
- Area code: 306

White Fox (2021 population: 343) is a village in the Canadian province of Saskatchewan within the Rural Municipality of Torch River No. 488 and Census Division No. 14. It is on Highway 55 near the White Fox River and nearly 14 km northwest of the town of Nipawin. White Fox has a community hall for use by local residents, a public library, post office, a skating and curling facility, and a campground/RV park.

== History ==
White Fox incorporated as a village on July 21, 1941.

== Demographics ==
Population history (1981–2016)
Year	Pop.	±%
1981	394	—
1986	464	+17.8%
1991	442	−4.7%
1996	402	−9.0%
2001	436	+8.5%
2006	348	−20.2%
2011	364	+4.6%
2016	355	−2.5%
Source: Statistics Canada via Saskatchewan Bureau of Statistics

In the 2021 Census of Population conducted by Statistics Canada, White Fox had a population of 343 living in 154 of its 175 total private dwellings, a change of −3.4% from its 2016 population of 355. With a land area of 0.99 km^{2} (0.38 sq mi), it had a population density of 346.5/km^{2} (897.3/sq mi) in 2021.

In the 2016 Census of Population, the Village of White Fox recorded a population of 355 living in 165 of its 184 total private dwellings, a −2.5% change from its 2011 population of 364. With a land area of 0.85 km^{2} (0.33 sq mi), it had a population density of 417.6/km^{2} (1,081.7/sq mi) in 2016.
