= Eldersley, Saskatchewan =

Village in Saskatchewan, Canada

Coordinates: 52°51′33″N 103°49′10″W

Eldersley is a hamlet in the Canadian province of Saskatchewan.

== Demographics ==
In the 2021 Census of Population conducted by Statistics Canada, Eldersley had a population of 25 living in 11 of its 13 total private dwellings, a change of -16.7% from its 2016 population of 30. With a land area of 0.16 km^{2} (0.062 sq mi), it had a population density of 156.3/km^{2} (404.7/sq mi) in 2021.
