= Brooksby, Saskatchewan =

Coordinates: 53°00′06″N 104°18′56″W

Location of Brooksby in Saskatchewan

Brooksby is an unincorporated community with the Rural Municipality of Willow Creek No. 458 in the Canadian province of Saskatchewan, located along both Highway 681 and the Canadian National Railway's Brooksby Subdivision.
