= Bjorkdale =

Village in Saskatchewan, Canada

- Village
- Village of Bjorkdale
- Motto: Village in the Valley
- Location of Bjorkdale in Saskatchewan Bjorkdale (Canada)
- Coordinates: 52.707°N 103.622°W
- Country: Canada
- Province: Saskatchewan
- Region: Central
- Census division: 14
- Rural municipality: Bjorkdale No. 426
- Incorporated (Village): 1968

Government
  - Type: Municipal
  - Governing body: Bjorkdale Village Council
  - Mayor: James Majewski
  - Administrator: Nicole Goldsworthy

Area
  - Total: 1.39 km^{2} (0.54 sq mi)

Population
  - Total: 201
  - Density: 145.1/km^{2} (376/sq mi)
- Time zone: CST
- Postal code: S0E 0E0
- Area code: 306
- Highways: Highway 23
- Railways: Abandoned
- Website: villageofbjorkdale.ca

Bjorkdale /ˈbɜːrkdeɪl/ (2016 population: 201) is a village in the Canadian province of Saskatchewan within the Rural Municipality of Bjorkdale No. 426 and Census Division No. 14. The village is at the junctions of Highways 23, 679, and 776, approximately 78 kilometres (48 mi) east of the city of Melfort.

== History ==
Bjorkdale incorporated as a village on April 1, 1968.

== Demographics ==
Population history (1981–2016)
Year	Pop.	±%
1981	269	—
1986	301	+11.9%
1991	251	−16.6%
1996	262	+4.4%
2001	229	−12.6%
2006	201	−12.2%
2011	199	−1.0%
2016	201	+1.0%
Source: Statistics Canada via Saskatchewan Bureau of Statistics

In the 2021 Census of Population conducted by Statistics Canada, Bjorkdale had a population of 147 living in 70 of its 88 total private dwellings, a change of −26.9% from its 2016 population of 201. With a land area of 1.36 km^{2} (0.53 sq mi), it had a population density of 108.1/km^{2} (279.9/sq mi) in 2021.

In the 2016 Census of Population, the Village of Bjorkdale recorded a population of 201 living in 90 of its 101 total private dwellings, a 1% change from its 2011 population of 199. With a land area of 1.39 km^{2} (0.54 sq mi), it had a population density of 144.6/km^{2} (374.5/sq mi) in 2016.

== See also ==
- List of communities in Saskatchewan
- List of francophone communities in Saskatchewan
- List of villages in Saskatchewan
