= Rural Municipality of Connaught No. 457 =

Rural municipality in Saskatchewan, Canada

Connaught No. 457
- Rural municipality
- Rural Municipality of Connaught No. 457
- Location of the RM of Connaught No. 457 in Saskatchewan
- Coordinates: 53.067°N 103.960°W
- Country: Canada
- Province: Saskatchewan
- Census division: 14
- SARM division: 4
- Formed: December 11, 1911

Government
  - Reeve: Arthur Lalonde
  - Governing body: RM of Connaught No. 457 Council
  - Administrator: Jaime Orr
  - Office location: Tisdale

Area (2016)
  - Land: 853.11 km^{2} (329.39 sq mi)

Population (2016)
  - Total: 586
  - Density: 0.7/km^{2} (1.8/sq mi)
- Time zone: CST
  - Summer (DST): CST
- Area codes: 306 and 639

The Rural Municipality of Connaught No. 457 (2016 population: 586) is a rural municipality (RM) in the Canadian province of Saskatchewan within Census Division No. 14 and SARM Division No. 4.

== History ==
The RM of Connaught No. 457 incorporated as a rural municipality on December 11, 1911. It was previously Local Improvement District No. 457.

== Geography ==
=== Communities and localities ===
The following urban municipalities are surrounded by the RM.

Villages

- Ridgedale

The following unincorporated communities are located within the RM.

Hamlets

- Armley
- Carlea
- Leacross

== Demographics ==
Population history (1981–2016)
Year	Pop.	±%
1981	982	—
1986	969	−1.3%
1991	865	−10.7%
1996	815	−5.8%
2001	748	−8.2%
2006	656	−12.3%
2011	629	−4.1%
2016	586	−6.8%
Source: Statistics Canada via Saskatchewan Bureau of Statistics

In the 2021 Census of Population conducted by Statistics Canada, the RM of Connaught No. 457 had a population of 491 living in 196 of its 221 total private dwellings, a change of −16.2% from its 2016 population of 586. With a land area of 848.82 km^{2} (327.73 sq mi), it had a population density of 0.6/km^{2} (1.5/sq mi) in 2021.

In the 2016 Census of Population, the RM of Connaught No. 457 recorded a population of 586 living in 227 of its 253 total private dwellings, a −6.8% change from its 2011 population of 629. With a land area of 853.11 km^{2} (329.39 sq mi), it had a population density of 0.7/km^{2} (1.8/sq mi) in 2016.

== Government ==
The RM of Connaught No. 457 is governed by an elected municipal council and an appointed administrator that meets on the second Wednesday of every month. The reeve of the RM is Arthur Lalonde while its administrator is Jaime Orr. The RM's office is located in Tisdale.
