= Spalding, Saskatchewan =

Village in Saskatchewan, Canada

Spalding
- Village
- Location within Saskatchewan Location within Canada
- Coordinates: 52°19′45″N 104°29′45″W
- Country: Canada
- Province: Saskatchewan
- Rural municipality: Spalding No. 368
- Post office: 1906-12-0
- Incorporated (village): 1924

Government
  - Mayor: Norman Foushe
  - Administrator: Cathy Holt
  - Councillor: Perry Eggerman; Richelle Beaudry; Matt Woloshyn; Robert Jessup
- Time zone: CST
- Postal code: S0K 4C0
- Area code: 306
- Highways: Highway 6 Highway 756

Spalding (2016 population: 244) is a village in the Canadian province of Saskatchewan within the Rural Municipality of Spalding No. 368 and Census Division No. 14. It is named after Spalding, Lincolnshire, birthplace of the wife of the first postmaster for Spalding. The local economy is dominated by agriculture.

== History ==
Spalding incorporated as a village on March 11, 1924. It was named after the birthplace of Pattie Hutchinson, the wife of the first postmaster Joseph William Hutchison, Spalding, Lincolnshire, England. In 2024, it celebrated its centenary by arranging for the official celebration to coincide with Canada Day in July.

The town has two municipal heritage properties:

- The Reynold Rapp Residence is a municipal designated historic building. The property is a two-story wood house that was constructed in 1926. In 1948, Reynold Rapp and his family moved into the house. He served as town overseer from 1950 to 1957 and as a member of Parliament from 1958 until 1968. The property was donated to the community in 1971 to serve as the home of the Reynold Rapp Museum, that was opened in 1972 by John Diefenbaker.
- Spalding United Church is a historic wood-frame church built in 1926. The design uses Gothic Revival and Tudor Revival elements.

== Demographics ==
Population history (1981–2016)
| Year | Pop. | ±% |
|---|---|---|
| 1981 | 337 | — |
| 1986 | 357 | +5.9% |
| 1991 | 287 | −19.6% |
| 1996 | 281 | −2.1% |
| 2001 | 261 | −7.1% |
| 2006 | 237 | −9.2% |
| 2011 | 242 | +2.1% |
| 2016 | 244 | +0.8% |
Source: Statistics Canada via Saskatchewan Bureau of Statistics

In the 2021 Census of Population conducted by Statistics Canada, Spalding had a population of 213 living in 107 of its 135 total private dwellings, a change of −12.7% from its 2016 population of 244. With a land area of 1.19 km^{2} (0.46 sq mi), it had a population density of 179.0/km^{2} (463.6/sq mi) in 2021.

In the 2016 Census of Population, the Village of Spalding recorded a population of 244 living in 112 of its 152 total private dwellings, a 0.8% change from its 2011 population of 242. With a land area of 1.18 km^{2} (0.46 sq mi), it had a population density of 206.8/km^{2} (535.6/sq mi) in 2016.

== Notable people ==
- Kari Matchett, actress
- Paul Yee, author
- Nathan Berg, classical/operatic bass-baritone singer

== See also ==
- List of villages in Saskatchewan
- List of francophone communities in Saskatchewan
