= Valparaiso, Saskatchewan =

Village in Saskatchewan, Canada

Valparaiso
- Village
- Village of Valparaiso
- Location within Saskatchewan Location within Canada
- Coordinates: 52.505964°N 104.104995°W
- Country: Canada
- Province: Saskatchewan
- Region: East-central
- Census division: 13
- Rural municipality: Star City No. 428

Government
  - Type: Municipal
  - Governing body: Valparaiso Village Council
  - Mayor: Margaret Emro
  - Administrator: Ann Campbell

Area
  - Total: 0.69 km^{2} (0.27 sq mi)

Population (2016)
  - Total: 15
  - Density: 21.6/km^{2} (56/sq mi)
- Time zone: UTC-6 (CST)
- Postal code: S0E 1P0
- Area code: 306
- Highways: Highway 3
- Railways: Canadian National Railway

Valparaiso (2016 population: 15) is a village in the Canadian province of Saskatchewan within the Rural Municipality of Star City No. 428 and Census Division No. 14. The village is located at the junction of Highway 3 and Range Road No. 160, approximately 20 km east of the city of Melfort. The name comes from that of Valparaíso in Chile.

== History ==
Valparaiso incorporated as a village on July 18, 1924.

== Demographics ==
Population history (1981–2016)
| Year | Pop. | ±% |
|---|---|---|
| 1981 | 43 | — |
| 1986 | 44 | +2.3% |
| 1991 | 30 | −31.8% |
| 1996 | 18 | −40.0% |
| 2001 | 20 | +11.1% |
| 2006 | 20 | +0.0% |
| 2011 | 15 | −25.0% |
| 2016 | 15 | +0.0% |
Source: Statistics Canada via Saskatchewan Bureau of Statistics

In the 2021 Census of Population conducted by Statistics Canada, Valparaiso had a population of 25 living in 11 of its 11 total private dwellings, a change of 66.7% from its 2016 population of 15. With a land area of 0.74 km^{2} (0.29 sq mi), it had a population density of 33.8/km^{2} (87.5/sq mi) in 2021.

In the 2016 Census of Population, the Village of Valparaiso recorded a population of 15 living in 9 of its 11 total private dwellings, a 0% change from its 2011 population of 15. With a land area of 0.69 km^{2} (0.27 sq mi), it had a population density of 21.7/km^{2} (56.3/sq mi) in 2016.

== See also ==
- List of communities in Saskatchewan
- List of villages in Saskatchewan
