= Zenon Park =

Village in Saskatchewan, Canada

- Village
- Location within Saskatchewan Location within Canada
- Coordinates: 53.064°N 103.754°W
- Country: Canada
- Province: Saskatchewan
- Region: Eastern
- Census division: 14
- Rural municipality: Arborfield No. 456
- Post office Founded: 1916
- Incorporated (Village): N/A
- Incorporated (Town): N/A

Government
  - Mayor: Eric Valois
  - Administrator: Lisa LeBlanc
  - Governing body: Zenon Park Village Council

Area
  - Total: 0.56 km^{2} (0.22 sq mi)

Population (2001)
  - Total: 231
  - Density: 415.2/km^{2} (1,075/sq mi)
- Time zone: CST
- Postal code: S0E 1W0
- Area code: 306
- Highways: Highway 23
- Website: Official website

Zenon Park (2016 population: 194) is a village in the Canadian province of Saskatchewan within the Rural Municipality of Arborfield No. 456 and Census Division No. 14. Zenon Park is bilingual, using English and French.

== History ==
In 1910, French-American settlers arrived; later came immigrants from Quebec and Northern United States. In 1913, Zenon Park was officially named after Zenon Chamberland, the postmaster. The economy then depended on agriculture, including alfalfa farming and lumber. Zenon Park incorporated as a village on July 28, 1941.

Heritage properties

The community has one designated heritage property, the Paroisse Notre Dame de la Nativité (Our Lady of the Nativity Roman Catholic Church) (previously called the Eglise Notre Dame de la Nativité) was constructed in between 1930 - 1931 by Filion & Sons Co.

== Demographics ==
Population history (1981–2016)
Year	Pop.	±%
1981	273	—
1986	286	+4.8%
1991	254	−11.2%
1996	259	+2.0%
2001	231	−10.8%
2006	192	−16.9%
2011	187	−2.6%
2016	194	+3.7%
Source: Statistics Canada via Saskatchewan Bureau of Statistics

In the 2021 Census of Population conducted by Statistics Canada, Zenon Park had a population of 176 living in 82 of its 100 total private dwellings, a change of −9.3% from its 2016 population of 194. With a land area of 0.53 km^{2} (0.20 sq mi), it had a population density of 332.1/km^{2} (860.1/sq mi) in 2021.

In the 2016 Census of Population, the Village of Zenon Park recorded a population of 194 living in 82 of its 88 total private dwellings, a 3.6% change from its 2011 population of 187. With a land area of 0.56 km^{2} (0.22 sq mi), it had a population density of 346.4/km^{2} (897.2/sq mi) in 2016.

== Transportation ==
Zenon Park is on the Thunder Rail short-line railway.

== Media ==
- CKZP-FM — Community Radio Station Operating in Zenon Park

== See also ==
- List of communities in Saskatchewan
- List of francophone communities in Saskatchewan
- List of villages in Saskatchewan
