= Leacross =

Community in Saskatchewan, Canada

Coordinates: 53°02′44″N 104°02′36″W

Location of Leacross in Saskatchewan

Leacross is a hamlet in Saskatchewan. It is accessed from Highway 35.

== See also ==
- List of communities in Saskatchewan
