= Ridgedale, Saskatchewan =

Village in Saskatchewan, Canada

Coordinates: 53°03′23″N 104°09′16″W

Ridgedale (2026 population: 65) is a village in the Canadian province of Saskatchewan within the Rural Municipality of Connaught No. 457 and Census Division No. 14. It is situated on the banks of the Carrot River.

== History ==
Ridgedale incorporated as a village on December 15, 1921.

== Demographics ==
Population history (1981–2016)
Year	Pop.	±%
1981	134	—
1986	149	+11.2%
1991	122	−18.1%
1996	104	−14.8%
2001	85	−18.3%
2006	66	−22.4%
2011	80	+21.2%
2016	55	−31.2%
2021	65	+18.2%
Source: Statistics Canada via Saskatchewan Bureau of Statistics

In the 2021 Census of Population conducted by Statistics Canada, Ridgedale had a population of 65 living in 27 of its 40 total private dwellings, a change of 18.2% from its 2016 population of 55. With a land area of 0.65 km^{2} (0.25 sq mi), it had a population density of 100.0/km^{2} (259.0/sq mi) in 2021.

In the 2016 Census of Population, the Village of Ridgedale recorded a population of 55 living in 29 of its 41 total private dwellings, a -45.5% change from its 2011 population of 80. With a land area of 0.72 km^{2} (0.28 sq mi), it had a population density of 76.4/km^{2} (197.8/sq mi) in 2016.

== See also ==
- List of communities in Saskatchewan
