= Star City, Saskatchewan =

Town in Saskatchewan, Canada

Star City
- Town
- Motto: "The brightest little city in the west!"
- Location in Saskatchewan Star City (Canada)
- Coordinates: 52°51′43″N 104°19′54″W
- Country: Canada
- Province: Saskatchewan
- Rural municipality: Star City No. 428
- Post office established: 1902-06-01

Government
  - Type: Town Council
  - Mayor: Beth Baerwald
  - Administrator: Anita Tkachuk

Area
  - Total: 7.5 km^{2} (2.9 sq mi)

Population (2011)
  - Total: 460
  - Density: 661.1/km^{2} (1,712/sq mi)
- Time zone: CST
- Postal code: S0E 1P0
- Area code: 306
- Highways: Highway 3 / Highway 681
- Website: Official website

Star City is a town of 460 inhabitants in Saskatchewan, Canada, approximately 120 kilometres (75 mi) southeast of Prince Albert and 18 kilometres (11 mi) east of Melfort.

It is named after its first postmaster, Walter Starkey. The town's economy is based primarily on agriculture. It has numerous services and a small K-12 school.

== Demographics ==
In the 2021 Census of Population conducted by Statistics Canada, Star City had a population of 374 living in 182 of its 206 total private dwellings, a change of −3.4% from its 2016 population of 387. With a land area of 0.7 km^{2} (0.27 sq mi), it had a population density of 534.3/km^{2} (1,383.8/sq mi) in 2021.

Canada census – Star City, Saskatchewan community profile

	2011
Population	460 (+7.5% from 2006)
Land area	0.70 km^{2} (0.27 sq mi)
Population density	661.1/km^{2} (1,712/sq mi)
Median age	44.7 (M: 42.2, F: 46.0)
Private dwellings	198 (total)
Median household income

References: 2011

== Historic buildings ==
The town has two historic buildings:

- The Town Office Building was constructed between 1919 and 1920 for the Bank of Commerce; the building currently houses a library.
- Golden Age Club Buildings

== See also ==
- List of towns in Saskatchewan
