= Gronlid, Saskatchewan =

Community in Saskatchewan, Canada

- Interactive map of Gronlid, Saskatchewan
- Coordinates: 53°06′00″N 104°27′51″W
- Country: Canada
- Province: Saskatchewan
- Rural municipality: Rural Municipality of Willow Creek No. 458
- Area codes: 306 and 639

Gronlid is a hamlet in the Canadian province of Saskatchewan.

== History ==
Gronlid was established as a village in 1925, named after H.O. Gronlid, a pastor who established a Lutheran congregation in the area.

Canadian Pacific Railway came into the village in 1927 as part of a now-defunct rail line north of Melfort.

== Demographics ==
In the 2021 Census of Population conducted by Statistics Canada, Gronlid had a population of 71 living in 32 of its 35 total private dwellings, a change of -4.1% from its 2016 population of 74. With a land area of 0.38 km^{2} (0.15 sq mi), it had a population density of 186.8/km^{2} (483.9/sq mi) in 2021.

== See also ==
- List of communities in Saskatchewan
