= Crooked River, Saskatchewan =

Community in Saskatchewan, Canada

Coordinates: 52°51′00″N 103°44′02″W

Crooked River is a special service area in the Canadian province of Saskatchewan. It is on the banks of Crooked River and access is from Highway 23.

== Demographics ==
In the 2021 Census of Population conducted by Statistics Canada, Crooked River had a population of 49 living in 20 of its 25 total private dwellings, a change of 53.1% from its 2016 population of 32. With a land area of 0.28 km^{2} (0.11 sq mi), it had a population density of 175.0/km^{2} (453.2/sq mi) in 2021.

== See also ==
- List of communities in Saskatchewan
