= Sylvania, Saskatchewan =

Coordinates: 52°41′33″N 104°00′13″W

Sylvania is a hamlet in the Canadian province of Saskatchewan. Sylvania is home to Patrick McKenna, co-Star of The Red Green Show.

== Demographics ==
In the 2021 Census of Population conducted by Statistics Canada, Sylvania had a population of 52 living in 24 of its 28 total private dwellings, a change of -8.8% from its 2016 population of 57. With a land area of 0.32 km^{2} (0.12 sq mi), it had a population density of 162.5/km^{2} (420.9/sq mi) in 2021.

== Notable people ==
Patrick McKenna, co-star of The Red Green Show
