= Tisdale, Saskatchewan =

Town in Saskatchewan, Canada

Tisdale
- Town
- Coat of arms
- Motto: Opportunity Grows Here
- Location within Saskatchewan
- Coordinates: 52°50′57″N 104°02′57″W
- Country: Canada
- Province: Saskatchewan
- Rural municipality: Tisdale No. 427
- Post office founded: 1 February 1904

Government
  - Mayor: Mike Hill
  - Federal electoral district Prince Albert MP: Randy Hoback
  - Provincial constituency Constituency of Carrot River Valley MLA: Terri Bromm

Area
  - Total: 6.47 km^{2} (2.50 sq mi)

Population (2021)
  - Total: 2,878
  - Summer (DST): CST

Tisdale is the business centre for the rich agricultural boreal forest area in central Saskatchewan, Canada. This town is in the Rural Municipality of Tisdale No. 427.

Located at the junction of Highway 35 and Highway 3, and serviced by both the Canadian National Railway and the Canadian Pacific Railway, Tisdale is the grain handling centre of the region with five inland grain terminals, and is the centre of regional industry.

The intersection of Highways 3 and 35 has traffic volumes of 11,200 vehicles per day and is the location of the largest 7-Eleven in Canada (by floor space) and the 4.9-metre (16 ft) long roadside statue of "The World's Largest Honey Bee" (the Giant Bee in Falher, is actually bigger at 6.91 m (22 ft 8 in)).

This town is the administrative office of the Kinistin Saulteaux Nation band government.

== History ==
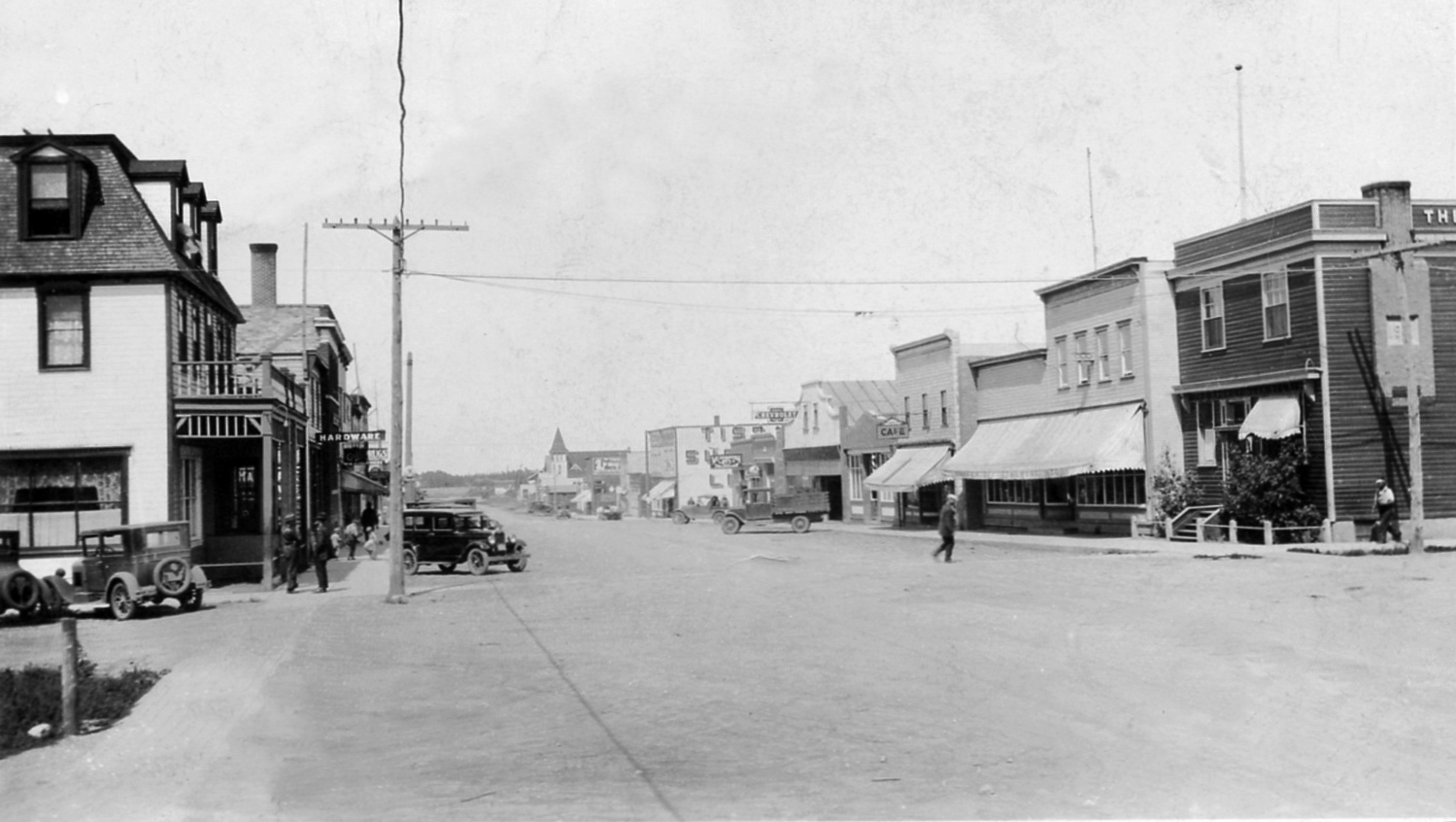
Tisdale, circa 1928

English explorer Henry Kelsey passed through this area in 1690 during his exploration of the Carrot River.

The post office of Tisdale, provisional District of Saskatchewan, North-West Territories was created on February 1, 1904. The community was originally known as "Doghide" after the Doghide River that flows through the town, but with the arrival of the railway the community was renamed "Tisdale" in honour of F.W. Tisdale, an employee of the Canadian Northern Railway.

Western Canada's biggest gun shoot out took place just east of Tisdale in 1920. The historic gunfight involved a squad of Saskatchewan Provincial Police and four outlaws.

In 2005, Tisdale celebrated its 100th birthday with a homecoming celebration in conjunction with Saskatchewan's centennial. The town also underwent beautification projects, including the construction of a new town square.

In 2016, Tisdale changed its town motto from "The Land of Rape and Honey" ("rape" referring to rapeseed) to "Opportunity Grows Here".

== Demographics ==
In the 2021 Census of Population conducted by Statistics Canada, Tisdale had a population of 2,962 living in 1,379 of its 1,613 total private dwellings, a change of −8.4% from its 2016 population of 3,235. With a land area of 6.56 km^{2} (2.53 sq mi), it had a population density of 451.5/km^{2} (1,169.4/sq mi) in 2021.

Canada census – Tisdale, Saskatchewan community profile

	2011
Population	3,180 (+6.0% from 2006)
Land area	6.47 km^{2} (2.50 sq mi)
Population density	491.5/km^{2} (1,273/sq mi)
Median age	46.1 (M: 42.3, F: 48.2)
Private dwellings	1,510 (total)
Median household income

References: 2011

== Economy ==
For 60 years, until October 2015, Tisdale was known as the "Land of Rape and Honey" due to its significance in both rapeseed and honey production. Tisdale is also known as the Honey Capital of Saskatchewan. One third of the farmland in the Northeast region is cropped into canola and 10% of the honey produced in Canada comes from this area. Traditionally the area produces about 4,100,000 kg (9,000,000 lb) ($7.2 million) in honey. Due to the sexual alternate meaning, industrial metal band Ministry named their 1988 album The Land of Rape and Honey after seeing the motto on a Tisdale souvenir mug. The town adopted the new motto "Opportunity Grows Here" on 22 August 2016.

Early in 2026 a large deposit of aluminum ore was found near Tisdale.

== Attractions ==
- The world's second largest (only to that of Falher's) honey bee statue. The bee is 2.1 m (6 ft 11 in) in height, 4.9 m (16 ft) long and has a wingspan of 3.5 m (11 ft) and is located as a roadside attraction in Tisdale.
- Falkon Theatre has operated since 1935.
- Tisdale Stock Car Club hosts the Silvertown Speedway race track.
- The Tisdale & District Museum is located in Henry Hamilton Park.

=== Parks ===
Five major parks are located within the town. Some regional and provincial parks near Tisdale are:

- Kipabiskau Regional Park is located in the Barrier Valley nearby.
- Greenwater Lake Provincial Park is the largest neighbouring park.
- Wapiti Valley Regional Park is located nearby on Codette Lake.
- Wapiti Valley is a skiing venue for winter sports enthusiasts.
- Doghide River Trail is a scenic nature trail located on the Doghide River.

== Sports ==
Tisdale is the regional sports hub which boasts a 6 sheet curling rink, indoor and outdoor skating rinks, soccer and football fields, indoor gun range and one of Saskatchewan's most picturesque 9 hole golf courses situated along the Doghide River. Tisdale's sporting facilities draw teams and individuals from all over Northeast Saskatchewan and beyond.

== Infrastructure ==
Tisdale Hospital is a 24-bed hospital with four doctors, an ambulance service, and long-term care facilities.

Tisdale has eight churches, two schools, and Suncrest College.

Tisdale Airport has a paved runway 14/32 with ARCAL (Aircraft Radio Control of Aerodrome Lighting), two grass runways, 17/35 and 08/26, a terminal building, and several hangars.

=== Tisdale RecPlex ===
Tisdale RecPlex (Tisdale's Recreational Centre) is a large 100,000 square foot joint-use complex that includes the following:

- Suncrest College,
- Tisdale Middle and Secondary School
- The Wapiti Regional Library and the school library
- a daycare
- a state of the art artificial ice arena and a 6 sheet curling rink
- The John Baron Auditorium
- The Maurice Taylor Performing Arts Theatre.

An outdoor pool, outdoor ice rink, trails and playing fields are located on the grounds surrounding the complex.

== Notable people ==
- Susan Aceron, actress
- Brent Butt, comedian and actor
- Lyall Dagg, 1964 Canadian and World Curling Champion
- Anne Edwards, politician
- Emily Farnham, 1993 curling hall of fame inductee
- William King, politician
- Lesley Magnus, field hockey player
- Paul Nicklen, biologist and photographer
- Ross Perkins, professional ice hockey player
- Dean Schmeichel, Olympic wrestler
- Sharon Thesen, poet
- John Messer, politician

== See also ==
- List of towns in Saskatchewan
