= Saskatchewan Association of Rural Municipalities =

Municipal association in Saskatchewan

The Saskatchewan Association of Rural Municipalities, often abbreviated as SARM, is an independent association that is responsible for representing the governments of the many rural municipalities in the Canadian province of Saskatchewan. It is an official Government of Saskatchewan sanctioned corporation. There are 296 rural municipalities represented by SARM in such areas as dealing with the provincial and federal governments. The members are arranged in divisions in order to elect SARM Directors.

== Board of Directors of Divisions ==
SARM is governed by a board of directors. There are eight people on the board of directors: the president, the vice-president, and one director from each SARM division. All board members must be elected rural municipal officials from their local municipality. The President of the Rural Municipal Administrators Association (RMAA) also sits on the board as an Ex-Officio member. The board of directors includes, as of October 2021:

- President — Ray Orb
- Vice-President — William Huber
- Division 1 - South East — Bob Moulding
- Division 2 - South Central — Cody Jordison
- Division 3 - South West — Darren Steinley
- Division 4 - North East — Myron Kopec
- Division 5 - North Central —Blair Cummins
- Division 6 - North West — Darwin Whitfield
- Ex-Officio — Guy Lagrandeur

== See also ==
- List of regions of Saskatchewan
- List of census divisions of Saskatchewan
- List of communities in Saskatchewan
- Geography of Saskatchewan
- Politics of Saskatchewan
