= Division No. 10, Saskatchewan =

Census division in Canada

Coordinates: 51°39′00″N 103°31′48″W

Division No. 10
- Census division in Saskatchewan
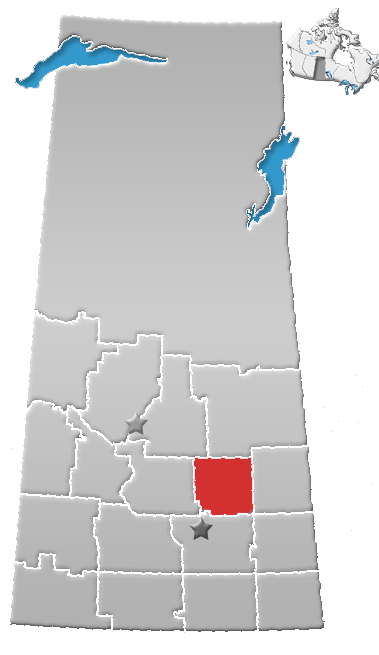
- Country: Canada
- Province: Saskatchewan

Area
  - Total: 12,220.36 km^{2} (4,718.31 sq mi)
- As of 2016

Population (2016)
  - Total: 16,563
  - Density: 1.3554/km^{2} (3.5104/sq mi)

Division No. 10 is one of eighteen census divisions in the province of Saskatchewan, Canada, as defined by Statistics Canada. It is located in the east-central part of the province. The most populous community in this division is Wynyard.

== Demographics ==
In the 2021 Census of Population conducted by Statistics Canada, Division No. 10 had a population of 16,483 living in 6,956 of its 8,226 total private dwellings, a change of −0.5% from its 2016 population of 16,563. With a land area of 11,922.33 km^{2} (4,603.24 sq mi), it had a population density of 1.4/km^{2} (3.6/sq mi) in 2021.

Knowledge of languages in Division No. 10 (1991−2021)
Language	2021		2011		2001		1991	
Language	Pop.	%	Pop.	%	Pop.	%	Pop.	%
English	15,965	99.75%	17,190	99.88%	18,940	99.92%	21,970	99.77%
Ukrainian	385	2.41%	1,000	5.81%	1,770	9.34%	2,635	11.97%
Tagalog	320	2%	75	0.44%	0	0%	0	0%
Cree (Note: Combined responses of the Cree-Innu languages, previously categorized under "Cree" in past censuses.)	270	1.69%	230	1.34%	315	1.66%	280	1.27%
French	195	1.22%	205	1.19%	265	1.4%	285	1.29%
Spanish	95	0.59%	25	0.15%	50	0.26%	20	0.09%
German (Note: Combined responses of the High German languages, including Standard German, Pennsylvania German, Swiss German, and Yiddish.)	90	0.56%	190	1.1%	495	2.61%	745	3.38%
Chinese (Note: Combined responses of the Chinese languages, including Mandarin, Cantonese, Min Nan, Hakka, Wu (Shanghainese), Min Dong, Chinese, n.o.s., and Chinese languages, n.i.e..)	60	0.37%	115	0.67%	50	0.26%	25	0.11%
Hungarian	40	0.25%	120	0.7%	145	0.76%	315	1.43%
Vietnamese	30	0.19%	0	0%	15	0.08%	10	0.05%
Polish	25	0.16%	105	0.61%	205	1.08%	420	1.91%
Russian	25	0.16%	0	0%	75	0.4%	110	0.5%
Dutch	20	0.12%	0	0%	15	0.08%	50	0.23%
Hindustani (Note: Combined responses of Hindi and Urdu as they form mutually intelligible registers of the Hindustani language.)	10	0.06%	0	0%	0	0%	0	0%
Arabic	0	0%	0	0%	35	0.18%	0	0%
Italian	0	0%	0	0%	0	0%	10	0.05%
Total responses	16,005	97.1%	17,210	98.09%	18,955	97.88%	22,020	98.63%
Total population	16,483	100%	17,546	100%	19,365	100%	22,325	100%

== Census subdivisions ==
The following census subdivisions (municipalities or municipal equivalents) are located within Saskatchewan's Division No. 10.

=== Towns ===
- Foam Lake
- Ituna
- Leroy
- Raymore
- Wadena
- Watson
- Wynyard

=== Villages ===
- Elfros
- Hubbard
- Jansen
- Kelliher
- Leross
- Lestock
- Margo
- Punnichy
- Quill Lake
- Quinton
- Semans

=== Resort villages ===
- Chorney Beach
- Leslie Beach

=== Rural municipalities ===
- RM No. 246 Ituna Bon Accord
- RM No. 247 Kellross
- RM No. 248 Touchwood
- RM No. 276 Foam Lake
- RM No. 277 Emerald
- RM No. 279 Mount Hope
- RM No. 307 Elfros
- RM No. 308 Big Quill
- RM No. 309 Prairie Rose
- RM No. 336 Sasman
- RM No. 337 Lakeview
- RM No. 338 Lakeside
- RM No. 339 Leroy

Source: Statistics Canada 2002 2001 Community Profiles Archived 2005-12-22 at the Wayback Machine

=== Indian reserves ===
- Beardy's and Okemasis 96 and 97A
- Day Star 87
- Fishing Lake 89
- Fishing Lake 89A
- Gordon 86
- Muskowekwan 85
- Muskowekwan 85-1
- Muskowekwan 85-10
- Muskowekwan 85-12
- Muskowekwan 85-15
- Muskowekwan 85-17
- Muskowekwan 85-22
- Muskowekwan 85-23
- Muskowekwan 85-24
- Muskowekwan 85-26
- Muskowekwan 85-27
- Muskowekwan 85-28
- Muskowekwan 85-29
- Muskowekwan 85-2A
- Muskowekwan 85-31
- Muskowekwan 85-33
- Muskowekwan 85-8
- Poorman 88

Source: Statistics Canada 2002 2001 Community Profiles. Archived 2005-12-22 at the Wayback Machine

== See also ==
- List of census divisions of Saskatchewan
- List of communities in Saskatchewan
