= Saskatchewan Highway 310 =

Provincial highway in Saskatchewan, Canada

Highway 310

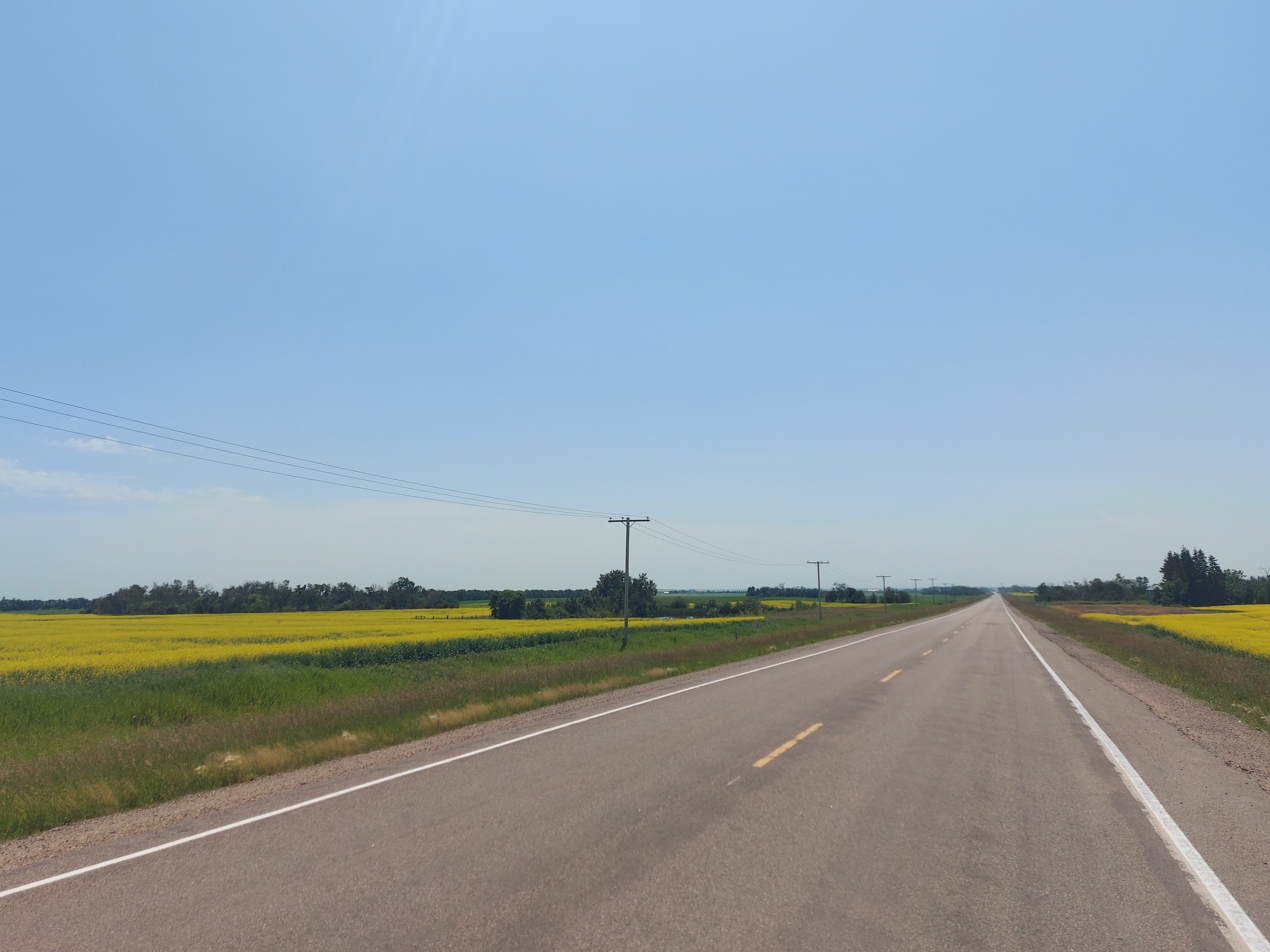
- Highway 310 north of Balcarres

Route information
- Maintained by Ministry of Highways and Infrastructure
- Length: 130.8 km (81.3 mi)

Major junctions
- South end: Highway 10 (Hwy 22) / Highway 619 in Balcarres
- Highway 15 at Ituna; Highway 52 near Ituna; Highway 16 (TCH/YH) at Foam Lake
- North end: Highway 5 at Kuroki

Location
- Country: Canada
- Province: Saskatchewan
- Rural municipalities: Abernethy, Tullymet, Ituna Bon Accord, Foam Lake, Sasman
- Towns: Foam Lake, Ituna

Highway system
- Provincial highways in Saskatchewan
| ← Highway 309 | → Highway 312 |

Highway 310 is a provincial highway in the Canadian province of Saskatchewan. It runs from Highway 10 / Highway 22 in Balcarres to Highway 5 in Kuroki.

The highway passes through the communities of Ituna and Foam Lake. It also passes near Ituna and District Regional Park, Leslie Beach Regional Park, Foam Lake, and Fishing Lake. It is about 131 kilometres (81 mi) long.

== Route description ==
Hwy 310 begins in the Rural Municipality of Abernethy No. 186 at the intersection with Hwy 10 (unsigned Hwy 22) in the town of Balcarres, with the road continuing south as Hwy 619. It heads north as a paved two-lane highway to cross over a former railway line and travel along the eastern side of town, passing through neighborhoods as it bypasses downtown just to the west. Leaving Balcarres, the highway enters the countryside of the Rural Municipality of Tullymet No. 216, passing through rural farmland for the next several kilometres, traversing two switchbacks and having intersections with Hwy 740 and Tullymet Road (Township Road 234, provides access to Tullymet Yard). Entering the Rural Municipality of Ituna Bon Accord No. 246, Hwy 310 has a junction with Hwy 731 (St. Joseph's Road) before entering the town of Ituna along 5th Avenue SW. After crossing a short causeway over a small, the highway makes a sharp left onto Main Street (provides access Ituna and District Regional Park) in a neighborhood to cross a railway and travel through the center of downtown, where it becomes concurrent (overlapped) with westbound Hwy 15 (1st Avenue NE). Leaving Ituna, the pair head northwest for a few kilometres before Hwy 310 splits off and joins the first couple kilometres of eastbound Hwy 52. Shortly thereafter, Hwy 310 splits off and heads north on its again, with the pavement transitioning to gravel as it traverses a switchback and travels through rural countryside for the next several kilometres to enter the Rural Municipality of Foam Lake No. 276.

Traveling past the locality of Winthorpe, the highway passes through a extremely long switchback, where it has an intersection with Township Road 291 (provides access to the hamlet of West Bend), where it regains asphalt, and cross several small streams on its way to have an intersection with Hwy 743 and enter the town of Foam Lake. It has an intersection with the Yellowhead Highway (Hwy 16) before traveling along the western side of town, bypassing downtown as it travels through rural neighborhoods, follows Railway Avenue for a short distance, crosses a railway, and crosses over Milligan Creek several times. Leaving Foam Lake, Hwy 310 heads north through farmland, passing just to the east of Foam Lake and the Foam Lake Heritage Marsh, to have an intersection with Hwy 745 before another rail crossing and making a sudden sharp right onto Township Road 330, with Range Road 2115 continuing north to the resort villages of Chorney Beach, Leslie Beach, Leslie Beach Regional Park, and the Fishing Lake First Nation. Curving around the eastern shoreline of Fishing Lake, it travels through KC Beach to enter the Rural Municipality of Sasman No. 336 and immediately passes through the hamlet of Ottman-Murray Beach on its way to the hamlet of Kuroki, where it comes to an end at an intersection with Hwy 5 on the eastern end of town immediately after crossing another railway. The road continues north as Range Road 2112.

== Major intersections ==
From south to north:

| Rural municipality | Location | km | mi | Destinations | Notes |
|---|---|---|---|---|---|
| Abernethy No. 186 | Balcarres | 0.0 | 0.0 | Highway 619 south – Indian Head Highway 10 (Hwy 22) – Regina, Yorkton | Southern terminus; northern terminus of Hwy 619; road continues south as Hwy 619 |
| Tullymet No. 216 | | 16.5 | 10.3 | Highway 740 east – Star Blanket Cree Nation | Western terminus of Hwy 740 |
| Tullymet No. 216 | | 23.2 | 14.4 | Tullymet Road (Township Road 234) – Tullymet Yard, R.M. Of Tullymet No. 216 Office | |
| Ituna Bon Accord No. 246 | | 40.7 | 25.3 | Highway 731 west (St. Joseph's Road) | Eastern terminus of Hwy 731 |
| Ituna Bon Accord No. 246 | Ituna | 42.8 | 26.6 | Main Street S – Ituna and District Regional Park | |
| Ituna Bon Accord No. 246 | Ituna | 43.2 | 26.8 | Highway 15 east – Melville | South end of Hwy 15 concurrency |
| Ituna Bon Accord No. 246 | | 47.8 | 29.7 | Highway 15 west / Highway 52 begins – Leross | North end of Hwy 15 concurrency; western terminus of Hwy 52; south end of Hwy 52 concurrency |
| Ituna Bon Accord No. 246 | | 49.5 | 30.8 | Highway 52 east – Yorkton | North end of Hwy 52 concurrency; southern end of unpaved section |
| Foam Lake No. 276 | | 83.7– 84.6 | 52.0– 52.6 | Township Road 291 – West Bend | Northern end of unpaved section |
| Foam Lake No. 276 | | 92.2 | 57.3 | Highway 743 west (Edmore Road) – Edmore | Eastern terminus of Hwy 743 |
| Foam Lake No. 276 | Foam Lake | 100.4 | 62.4 | Highway 16 (TCH/YH) – Saskatoon, Yorkton | |
| Foam Lake No. 276 | | 114.8 | 71.3 | Highway 745 west – Elfros | Eastern terminus of Hwy 745 |
| Foam Lake No. 276 | | 118.0 | 73.3 | Range Road 2115 – Chorney Beach, Leslie Beach, Leslie Beach Regional Park, Fishing Lake 89 | |
| Sasman No. 336 | Kuroki | 130.8 | 81.3 | Highway 5 to Highway 38 – Humboldt, Saskatoon, Canora | Northern terminus; road continues north as Range Road 2112 |
1.000 mi = 1.609 km; 1.000 km = 0.621 mi: Concurrency terminus

== See also ==
- Transportation in Saskatchewan
- Roads in Saskatchewan
