= Fishing Lake (disambiguation) =

Fishing Lake is a lake in Saskatchewan, Canada.

Fishing Lake may also refer to any of the following:

== Lakes ==
- Fishing Lakes, a chain of lakes in Saskatchewan, Canada
- Upper Fishing Lake, a lake in Saskatchewan, Canada
- Lower Fishing Lake, a lake in Saskatchewan, Canada
- Little Fishing Lake, a lake in Saskatchewan

== Communities ==
- Fishing Lake Metis Settlement, a settlement in Alberta, Canada
- Fishing Lake First Nation, a First Nation in Saskatchewan, Canada
- Fishing Lake 89, an Indian reserve in Saskatchewan, Canada
- Fishing Lake 89A, an Indian reserve in Saskatchewan, Canada
- Fishing Lake 89D1, an Indian reserve in Saskatchewan, Canada
- Little Fishing Lake, Saskatchewan, a hamlet in Saskatchewan, Canada
- North Shore Fishing Lake, a hamlet in Saskatchewan, Canada
