= Fishing Lake =

Lake in Saskatchewan, Canada

- Location in Saskatchewan Fishing Lake (Canada)
- Location: RM of Foam Lake No. 276 and RM of Sasman No. 336, Saskatchewan
- Coordinates: 51.8466°N 103.5321°W
- Type: Endorheic lake
- Part of: Red River drainage basin
- Primary outflows: None
- Basin countries: Canada
- Surface area: 3,679.2 ha (9,092 acres)
- Max. depth: 17.99 m (59.0 ft)
- Shore length^{1}: 55.72 km (34.62 mi)
- Surface elevation: 526 m (1,726 ft)
- Settlements: Leslie Beach; Chorney Beach
- ^{1} Shore length is not a well-defined measure.

Fishing Lake is a closed basin freshwater lake in the Canadian province of Saskatchewan. The lake is about 22 kilometres (14 mi) north of the town of Foam Lake and 24 kilometres (15 mi) east of the town of Wadena. It is accessed from Highway 5 and Highway 310. The northern and eastern shore is in the RM of Sasman No. 336 and the southern and western shore is in the RM of Foam Lake No. 276. The north-east portion of the lake–on the east side of McCormick Bay–is designated as Fishing Lake Wildlife Refuge.

The lake does not have an effective outlet channel, and therefore is prone to flooding. Record floods in 2007 resulted in a plan by the Government of Saskatchewan to lower the level of the lake by digging a drainage channel. The Fishing Lake First Nation opposed this plan, and instead flood control berms were constructed.

== Communities ==
The resort villages of Leslie Beach and Chorney Beach are located on the southern shores of the lake and the hamlet of North Shore Fishing Lake is on the north side and Ottman-Murray Beach are on the eastern shore. Sabitawasis Beach Indian reserve is along the northern shore where Van Pattens Creek enters the lake, and the Indian reserves of Fishing Lake 89A and Fishing Lake 89 are on the western side.

== Leslie Beach Regional Park ==
Leslie Beach Regional Park (51.8082°N 103.5611°W), also known as Fishing Lake Regional Park, is a regional park along the shores of Fishing Lake that was established in 1967. The park operates at four locations around the lake, including Leslie Beach, Saskin Beach, KC Beach, and Foam Lake Golf and Country Club.

Since the 1930s, the lake and its beaches have been popular with tourists and vacationers. During the mid-1940s and early 1950s, interest in developing around the lake grew, and in 1952 the rural co-operative associations of the surrounding area established the Leslie Beach Recreation Co-operative Board. Local volunteers worked at developing Leslie Beach, and in 1967 the Fishing Lake Regional Park Authority was established. The regional park included Leslie Beach itself, Foam Lake Golf and Country Club, and the other two beach sites. Major floods in 1997 and 2007 caused some parts of the park to be permanently flooded. In 2017 parts of the park's boundary were officially adjusted to reflect this.

Leslie Beach, the main part of the park, is along the southern shore of the lake alongside the resort village of the same name. At the entrance to the park is a replica of the largest northern pike caught in a southern Saskatchewan lake. Nicknamed Pikezilla, it was caught on 9 February 2009 and weighed in at 18.1 kg (39.9 lb). Besides the replica fish, Leslie Beach also has a campground that has 116 seasonal campsites, 51 daily sites, and washroom and shower facilities. At the beach there are a boat launch, a fish filleting station, concession, and picnic tables. Also within the park, there are a baseball diamond, soccer pitch, a 3-hole pitch and putt golf course, and an 18-hole miniature golf course.

Saskin Beach is at the community of North Shore Fishing Lake on Buckhorn Bay. KC Beach, named for the Knights of Columbus, is at the south-eastern shore of the lake, and it has a convenience store and boat launch.

Foam Lake Golf and Country Club is a nine-hole grass-green golf course about 500 metres (1,600 ft) east of Leslie Beach and 22 kilometres (14 mi) north of Foam Lake. It is a par 35, 2,913-yard course that has a pro-shop and a licensed clubhouse.

== Fish species ==
Commonly found fish in Fishing Lake include walleye and northern pike.

== See also ==
- List of lakes of Saskatchewan
- List of protected areas of Saskatchewan
- Tourism in Saskatchewan
