= Elfros =

Village in Saskatchewan, Canada

- Village
- Village of Elfros
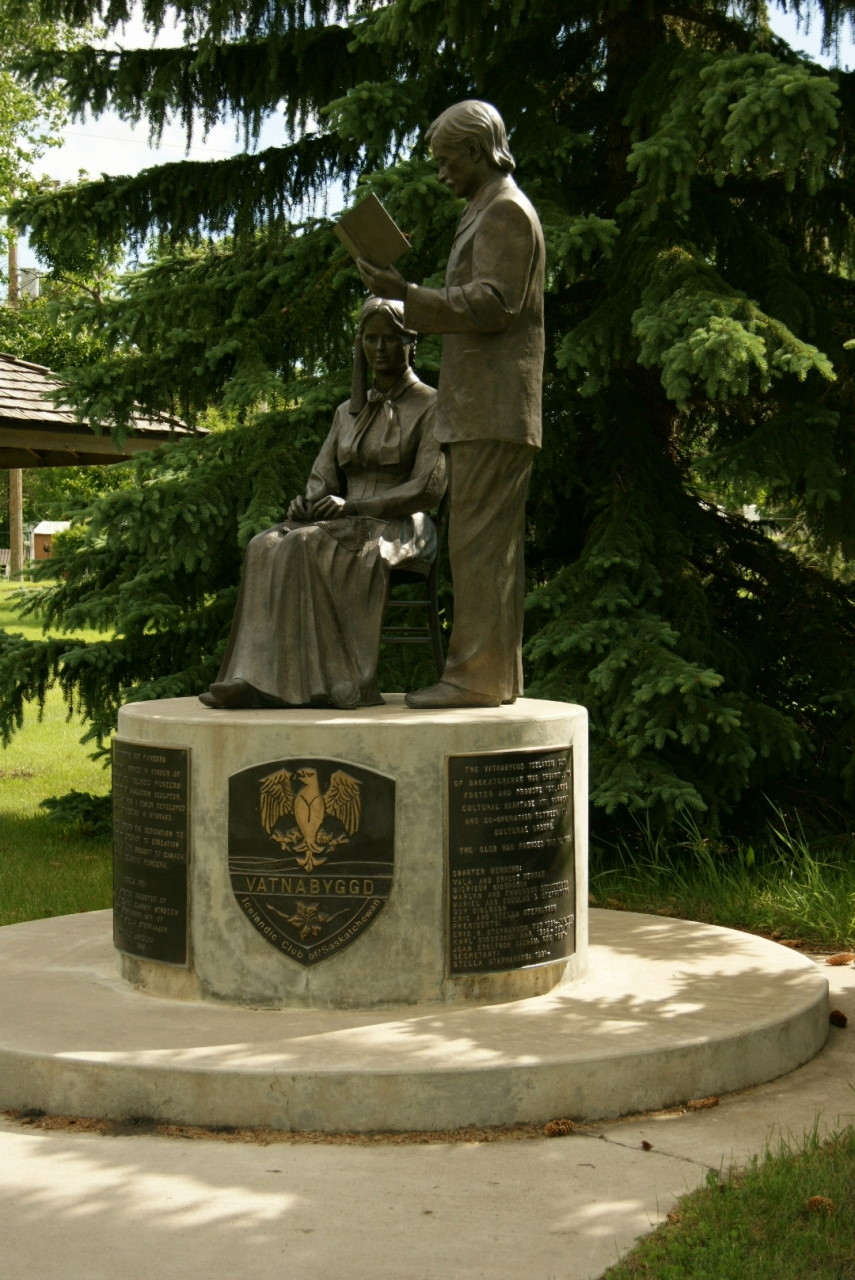
- Icelandic settler statue in Elfros

- Location of Elfros in Saskatchewan Elfros (Canada)
- Coordinates: 51°44′30″N 103°51′50″W
- Country: Canada
- Province: Saskatchewan
- Region: Central
- Census division: 10
- Rural Municipality: Elfros

Government
  - Type: Municipal
  - Governing body: Elfros Village Council
  - Mayor: Arleigh Helgason
  - Administrator: Tina Heistad Douglas

Area
  - Total: 2.52 km^{2} (0.97 sq mi)

Population (2016)
  - Total: 90
  - Density: 37.5/km^{2} (97/sq mi)
- Time zone: UTC-6 (CST)
- Postal code: S0A 0V0
- Area code: 306
- Highways: Highway 16; Highway 35
- Railways: Canadian Pacific Railway

Elfros (2016 population: 90) is a village in the Canadian province of Saskatchewan within the Rural Municipality of Elfros No. 307 and Census Division No. 10. It is northeast of Regina and southeast of the Quill Lakes at the junction of Highway 16 and Highway 35. It was the hometown of the protagonist in the 2018 Canadian horror film Archons.

== History ==
Elfros was first settled by Icelandic immigrants, and many of the present inhabitants are of Icelandic descent. A post office was opened in 1909. Elfros incorporated as a village on December 1, 1909.

From the Icelandic Pioneer Memorial in Elfros comes the following quotation.

"There were two waves of Icelandic settlement to and within Saskatchewan. The first group came directly from Iceland, paused briefly in Winnipeg, then moved on to Saskatchewan. The second group trekked north and west from older settlements in North Dakota and Manitoba.

In June 1882, the first Icelandic families came to Fishing Lake. The magnets were hay and water. Settlements followed at Foam Lake, Kristnes, Leslie, Mt Hecla, Holar, Elfros, Mozart, Wynyard, Kandahar and Dafoe, creating the largest Icelandic settlement outside of Iceland.

Icelanders were not natural farmers. They were poets, musicians and visionaries, people who saw work as a means to an end. Icelandic communities became cultural centres with bands, choirs and libraries. Icelanders built community halls. Many schools in the Vatnabyggd area have Icelandic names.

Important celebrations included Torrablot, the First Day of Summer, and Independence Day celebrations on June 17 and August 2.

For spiritual nourishment, Icelanders relied on traveling preachers, meeting in homes and community halls.

The Icelanders who came to Saskatchewan became competent farmers but saw the land as a means to improve conditions both for themselves and for their children. Aware of the value of family and community, they left a legacy of art, literacy, music and social responsibility." Elfros at Flickriver

== Demographics ==
Population history (1981–2016)
Year	Pop.	±%
1981	199	—
1986	221	+11.1%
1991	181	−18.1%
1996	167	−7.7%
2001	161	−3.6%
2006	110	−31.7%
2011	96	−12.7%
2016	90	−6.2%
Source: Statistics Canada via Saskatchewan Bureau of Statistics

In the 2021 Census of Population conducted by Statistics Canada, Elfros had a population of 90 living in 48 of its 56 total private dwellings, a change of 0% from its 2016 population of 90. With a land area of 2.48 km^{2} (0.96 sq mi), it had a population density of 36.3/km^{2} (94.0/sq mi) in 2021.

In the 2016 Census of Population, the village of Elfros recorded a population of 90 living in 52 of its 58 total private dwellings, a −6.7% change from its 2011 population of 96. With a land area of 2.52 km^{2} (0.97 sq mi), it had a population density of 35.7/km^{2} (92.5/sq mi) in 2016.

== See also ==
- List of communities in Saskatchewan
- List of villages in Saskatchewan
