= Rural Municipality of Lakeview No. 337 =

Rural municipality in Saskatchewan, Canada

Lakeview No. 337
- Rural municipality
- Rural Municipality of Lakeview No. 337
- Location of the RM of Lakeview No. 337 in Saskatchewan
- Coordinates: 51.994°N 103.874°W
- Country: Canada
- Province: Saskatchewan
- Census division: 10
- SARM division: 4
- Formed: December 13, 1909

Government
  - Reeve: Mervin Kryzanowski
  - Governing body: RM of Lakeview No. 337 Council
  - Administrator: Carrie Turnbull
  - Office location: Wadena

Area (2016)
  - Land: 724.89 km^{2} (279.88 sq mi)

Population (2016)
  - Total: 368
  - Density: 0.5/km^{2} (1.3/sq mi)
- Time zone: CST
  - Summer (DST): CST
- Area codes: 306 and 639

The Rural Municipality of Lakeview No. 337 (2016 population: 368) is a rural municipality (RM) in the Canadian province of Saskatchewan within Census Division No. 10 and SARM Division No. 4.

== History ==
The RM of Lakeview No. 337 incorporated as a rural municipality on December 13, 1909.

== Geography ==
=== Communities and localities ===
The following urban municipalities are surrounded by the RM.

Towns

- Wadena

The following unincorporated communities are within the RM.

Organized hamlets

- Hendon

Localities

- Clair
- Paswegin
- Tornea

== Demographics ==
Population history (1981–2016)
Year	Pop.	±%
1981	872	—
1986	829	−4.9%
1991	689	−16.9%
1996	585	−15.1%
2001	477	−18.5%
2006	393	−17.6%
2011	336	−14.5%
2016	368	+9.5%
Source: Statistics Canada via Saskatchewan Bureau of Statistics

In the 2021 Census of Population conducted by Statistics Canada, the RM of Lakeview No. 337 had a population of 366 living in 148 of its 167 total private dwellings, a change of −0.5% from its 2016 population of 368. With a land area of 709.1 km^{2} (273.8 sq mi), it had a population density of 0.5/km^{2} (1.3/sq mi) in 2021.

In the 2016 Census of Population, the RM of Lakeview No. 337 recorded a population of 368 living in 153 of its 174 total private dwellings, a 9.5% change from its 2011 population of 336. With a land area of 724.89 km^{2} (279.88 sq mi), it had a population density of 0.5/km^{2} (1.3/sq mi) in 2016.

== Attractions ==
- Wadena & District Museum & Nature Center
- Wadena Wildlife Wetlands
- Little Quill Lake

== Government ==
The RM of Lakeview No. 337 is governed by an elected municipal council and an appointed administrator that meets on the second Wednesday of every month. The reeve of the RM is Mervin Kryzanowski while its administrator is Carrie Turnbull. The RM's office is located in Wadena.

== Transportation ==
- Saskatchewan Highway 5
- Saskatchewan Highway 35
- Saskatchewan Highway 49
- Saskatchewan Highway 640
- Saskatchewan Highway 755
- Saskatchewan Highway 758
- Wadena Airport

== See also ==
- List of rural municipalities in Saskatchewan
