= Foam Lake (Saskatchewan) =

Lake in Saskatchewan, Canada

- Location in Saskatchewan Foam Lake (Canada)
- Location: RM of Foam Lake No. 276, Saskatchewan
- Coordinates: 51.7167°N 103.6172°W
- Part of: Quill Lakes drainage basin
- Primary inflows: Milligan Creek; Beckett Brook
- Primary outflows: Milligan Creek
- Basin countries: Canada
- Surface area: 1,622 ha (4,010 acres)
- Surface elevation: 539 m (1,768 ft)
- Settlements: None

Foam Lake is a shallow lake in the aspen parkland ecoregion of the Canadian Province of Saskatchewan. It was named "Foam Lake" in 1882 by the Milligans (who were the first settlers in the area) because of the large amount of froth that forms on it. The lake and surrounding marsh are a protected area and important wildlife habitat. The primary inflows for the lake, Milligan Creek and Beckett Brook, originate to the south in the Touchwood Hills. From the north shore of the lake, Milligan Creek flows north-west into the salty Quill Lakes. The Quill Lakes are endorheic lakes as they have no outlet.

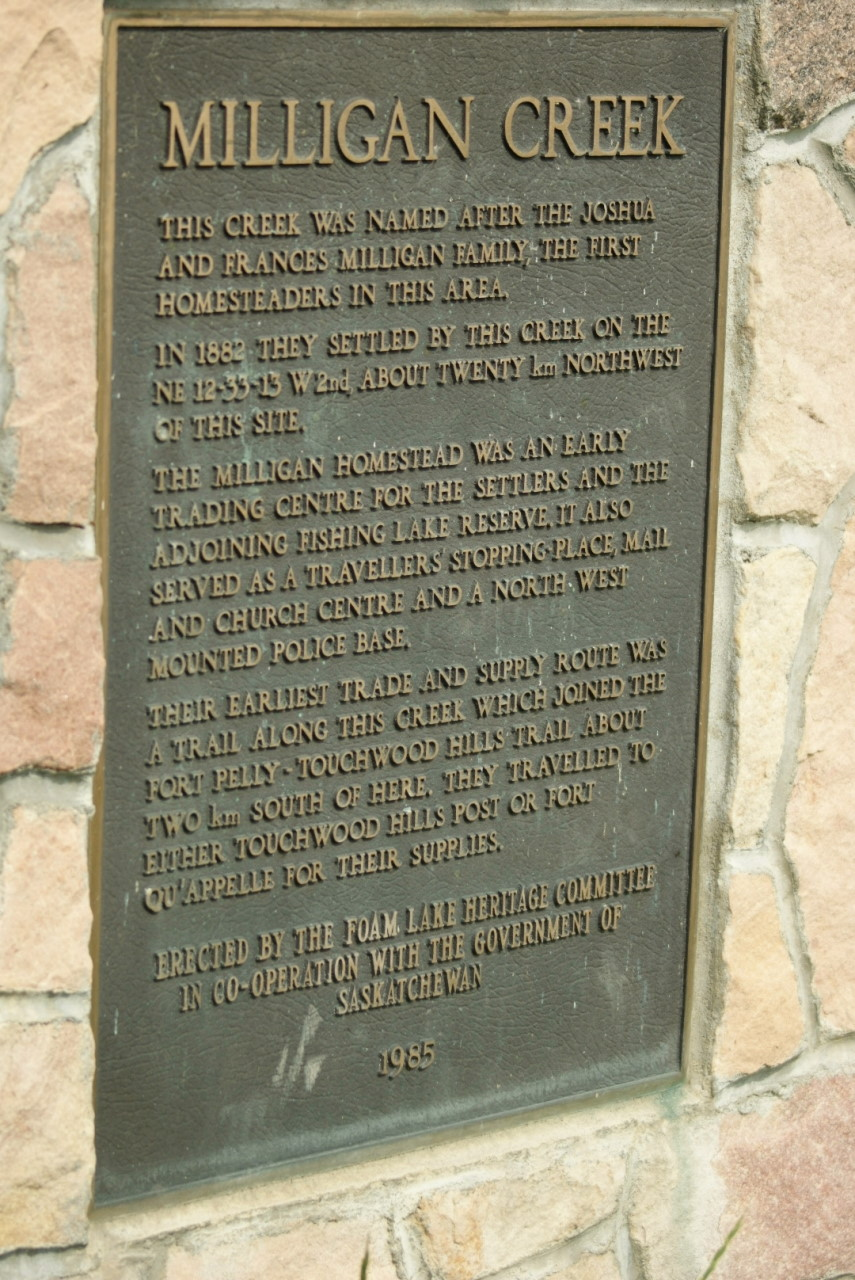
Plaque commemorating the Milligans near Foam Lake and Milligan Creek

Foam lake is about 5 kilometres (3.1 mi) north-west of the town of Foam Lake in the RM of Foam Lake No. 276. Access to the lake is from Highways 16 and 310.

== Foam Lake Heritage Marsh ==
Foam Lake Heritage Marsh surrounds much of the lake and is a large staging area in the autumn for thousands of ducks, geese, swans, and cranes on their migration south. It designated an Important Bird Area of Canada (Foam Lake SK 065) and is part of the Quill Lakes International Bird Area. Located 7 kilometres (4.3 mi) north-west of the town of Foam Lake, it covers an area of about 6,500 acres. Beginning in 1980, restoration of the marsh began as prior to that, there were several attempts to drain it. The marsh and lake became protected by an agreement between adjacent landowners, the RM of Foam Lake, and the Foam Lake Conservation and Development Area Authority. Beginning in 1985, Ducks Unlimited Canada began the construction of nine dams and dykes around the lake and marsh designed to regulate water levels to benefit both wildlife and farmers.

South of the lake, alongside Highway 16, is the Foam Lake Nature Centre. The Nature Centre has a waterfowl diorama, an interactive map of the Heritage Marsh, and interpretive displays. There is also a picnic area, small campground, and a 1 km (0.62 mi) long nature trail that follows Milligan Creek. At the lake, there are two wildlife viewing areas. Johnson Viewing Area is located at the northern end of the lake and includes a viewing tower and canoe launch. Bertdale Viewing Area is located near the centre of the marsh.

Birds found around the lake and marsh include Canada geese, sandhill cranes, snow geese, peregrine falcons, American coots, black-crowned night herons, American bitterns, soras, American white pelicans, black terns, common terns, pied-billed grebes, red-necked grebes, great blue herons, Franklin's gulls, tundra swans, common goldeneyes, and short-eared owls.

== Fish species ==
Walleye are a commonly found fish in Foam Lake.

== See also ==
- List of lakes of Saskatchewan
- List of protected areas of Saskatchewan
