= Leslie, Saskatchewan =

Community in Saskatchewan, Canada

Leslie
- Special service area
- Location of Leslie in Saskatchewan Leslie (Canada)
- Coordinates: 51.691°N 103.712°W
- Country: Canada
- Province: Saskatchewan
- Region: East Central
- Census division: 10
- Rural Municipality (RM): Elfros No. 307
- Post office established: 1909-06-01

Area
  - Total: 0.63 km^{2} (0.24 sq mi)

Population (2016)
  - Total: 15
  - Density: 23.9/km^{2} (62/sq mi)
- Time zone: CST
- Postal code: S0A 2E0
- Area code: 306

Leslie is a special service area in the Rural Municipality of Elfros No. 307, Saskatchewan, Canada. Listed as a designated place by Statistics Canada, the community had a population of 15 in the Canada 2016 Census. The community is located just off of Highway 16 between Foam Lake and Elfros.

The first post office was established in 1909 as Leslie Station (with C. A. Clarke as postmaster), with the name of the community changed to Leslie in 1962. The last postmaster was Victoria Ann St. Amand in 1987.

== Demographics ==
In the 2021 Census of Population conducted by Statistics Canada, Leslie had a population of 20 living in 10 of its 15 total private dwellings, a change of 33.3% from its 2016 population of 15. With a land area of 0.55 km^{2} (0.21 sq mi), it had a population density of 36.4/km^{2} (94.2/sq mi) in 2021.

Canada census – Leslie, Saskatchewan community profile

	2016
Population	15 (0.0% from 2011)
Land area	0.63 km^{2} (0.24 sq mi)
Population density	23.9/km^{2} (62/sq mi)
Median age
Private dwellings	13 (total)
Median household income	$N/A

References: 2016

== See also ==
- List of communities in Saskatchewan
