= Kylemore, Saskatchewan =

Community in Saskatchewan, Canada

Kylemore
- Unincorporated community
- Location within Saskatchewan Location within Canada
- Coordinates: 51.905°N 103.638°W
- Country: Canada
- Province: Saskatchewan
- Region: East-central
- Census division: 10
- Rural municipality: Sasman No. 336

Area
  - Total: 0.0 km^{2} (0 sq mi)

Population (2016)
  - Total: 0
  - Density: 0.47/km^{2} (1.2/sq mi)
- Time zone: CST
- Area code: 306
- Highways: Highway 5 & Highway 665
- Railways: Canadian National Railway

Kylemore is an unincorporated community in the Rural Municipality of Sasman No. 336, Saskatchewan, Canada. Listed as a designated place by Statistics Canada, the community had a population of 0 in the Canada 2016 Census. It was designated as an organized hamlet prior to 2018. The community is located 12 km east of Wadena, and approximately 250 km east of Saskatoon.

Canada's first aboriginal urban reserve was established here in 1981.

== History ==
Kylemore relinquished its organized hamlet designation on 31 December 2017.

== Demographics ==
In the 2021 Census of Population conducted by Statistics Canada, Kylemore had a population of 5 living in 2 of its 2 total private dwellings, a change of inf% from its 2016 population of . With a land area of 0.25 km^{2} (0.097 sq mi), it had a population density of 20.0/km^{2} (51.8/sq mi) in 2021.

Canada census – Kylemore, Saskatchewan community profile

	2016
Population	0 (-100.0% from 2011)
Land area	0.59 km^{2} (0.23 sq mi)
Population density	84.6/km^{2} (219/sq mi)
Median age
Private dwellings	2 (total)
Median household income	$N/A

References: 2016

== See also ==
- List of communities in Saskatchewan
