= Muskowekwan First Nation =

First Nation in Saskatchewan, Canada

Coordinates: 51°19′16″N 104°05′46″W

Muskowekwan First Nation Band No. 392
- People: Saulteaux
- Treaty: Treaty 4
- Headquarters: Lestock
- Province: Saskatchewan

Land
- Main reserve: Muskowekwan 85
- Other reserve(s): Muskowekwan 85-1; Muskowekwan 85-2A; Muskowekwan 85-8; Muskowekwan 85-10; Muskowekwan 85-12; Muskowekwan 85-15; Muskowekwan 85-17; Muskowekwan 85-22; Muskowekwan 85-23; Muskowekwan 85-24; Muskowekwan 85-26; Muskowekwan 85-27; Muskowekwan 85-28; Muskowekwan 85-29; Muskowekwan 85-31; Muskowekwan 85-33; and others up to 85-69

Population (2019)
- On reserve: 579
- Off reserve: 1384
- Total population: 1963

Government
- Chief: Jamie Wolfe

Tribal Council
- Touchwood Agency Tribal Council

Website
- www.muskowekwan.com

Muskowekwan First Nation (Ojibwe: Mashkawigwaning) is a Saulteaux (Ojibway) First Nation who inhabit approximately 100 km northwest of Melville, Saskatchewan, Canada. As of May, 2008, the First Nation has 1,517 registered people, of which their on-reserve population was 400.

== History ==
Chief Ka-nee-na-wup (Anishinaabe language: Geniinewab, "One Who Sits Like an Eagle") and his Saulteaux band lived along the Upper Qu'Appelle Lakes prior to signing Treaty 4 on September 15, 1874. When Ka-nee-na-wup died, his son Muscowequan or Muskowekwan (Anishinaabe language: Maskawigwan, "Hard Quill") became chief. A reserve was surveyed in 1883, incorporating the settlement where they had already started farming.

On September 15, 1874, the Crown signed Treaty 4 with “the Cree, Saulteaux and other Indians,” including Chief Ka-kee-na-wup on behalf of Muskowekwan First Nation. Treaty 4 has also been known as the Qu'Appelle Treaty, as its first signings were conducted at Fort Qu'Appelle, North-West Territories. Additional signings or adhesions continued until September 1877. Muskowekwan First Nation occupies the Muskowekwan Reserve, which borders on the town of Lestock, Saskatchewan, and covers 16,479 acres (66.69 km^{2}). At the signing of Treaty 4, there were 66 members present, 1 councillor, and a chief. The Muskowekwan First Nation occupies Indian Reserve No. 85 in southern Saskatchewan. The language of these people is Western Ojibwa. Treaty 4 was negotiated by the Crown's Canadian commissioners to gain land for European settlement, agriculture, and industry, as well as for the transcontinental railway that would run through southern Saskatchewan. A key demand of the Cree and the Saulteaux First Nations was for education. Since the buffalo had nearly vanished from the prairies, they wanted to acquire new tools that would ensure a strong and prosperous future. Under Treaty 4, the Cree and Salteaux First Nations relinquished most of current-day southern Saskatchewan. In return, they received small parcels of land, as well as long-term government commitments in a number of areas, including education.

Treaty 4 signatories from the chiefs as follows: Ka-kii-shi-way (Ochapowace), Pis-qua (Pasqua), Ka-wez-ance (Cowessess), Ka-kee-na-wup (Muskowekwan), Kus-kee-tew-mus-coo-musqua (Little Black Bear), Ka-ne-on-us-ka-tew (Gordon), Can-ah-ha-cha-pew (Peepeekisis), Kii-si-caw-chuck (Day Star), Ka-ra-ca-toose (Kawacatoose), Ka-kii-nis-ta-haw (Kahkewistehaw), Cha-ca-chas (Ochapowace), Wa-pii-moose-too-sus (Star Blanket), Meemay (Cote)

=== Treaty conditions ===
Reserves of 1 square mile (2.6 km^{2}) per every 5 persons, Annuities of $25 for chief, plus coat and medal, Headman $15 annuity, Each individual $5 annuity, Chief's suit of clothing every three years, Blankets, calicoes, and British flag (once), Powder, shot, and twine annually $750, Per family: 2 hoes, spade, scythe, axe, seed, Per ten families: 1 plough, 2 harrows, For chief: oxen, bull, 4 cows, carpenter's tools, 5 hand saws, 5 augers, crosscut saw, pit saw, and grindstone, School on reserve, No liquor allowed, Hunting, fishing, and trapping

== Muskowekwan First Nation Potash Mines ==
The Muskowekwan First Nation potash mine project has been accepted by the federal government under the First Nations Commercial and Industrial Development Act (FNCIDA). The act will enable the federal government to enact regulations that incorporate a provincial regulatory regime to govern commercial and industrial activities within a province. The acceptance of the Muskowekwan project under FNCIDA means that the Government of Canada can begin the process of developing regulations for the First Potash Ventures mine. FNCIDA, which came into effect in 2006, reproduces the provincial rules and regulations that apply to similar large-scale commercial or industrial projects off reserve and applies them to a specific on-reserve project. First Potash Ventures, a joint partnership between Encanto and Muskowekwan Resources Ltd., is working toward developing the mine on the Muskowekwan First Nation, located 100 km northeast of Regina. The mine is expected to produce up to 2.8 million tons of potash annually over a 50-year-plus span. The project will provide real economic opportunities for the Muskowekwan First Nation, as well as the surrounding area, by providing training and employment opportunities during the construction and operation of the mine.

== Governance ==
The Muskowekwan First Nation elect their council on a two-year term under the authority of the act electoral system. As of 2025, the chief is Cynthia Desjarlais.

The council is a member of Touchwood Tribal Agency Council, a regional chiefs' council.

=== Reserve ===
In 1993 Muskowekwan's Treaty Land Entitlement Claim was ratified, enabling the First Nation to increase its land holdings to a total of 12,517.3 ha. The First Nation have reserved for themselves the Muskowekwan 85 Indian Reserves, of which the 7,381.7 ha Muskowekwan 85 Indian Reserve, located 64 km northwest of Fort Qu'Appelle, serves as their main reserve. Other Indian reserves of the Muskowekwan 85 Indian Reserve series range from 6.1 ha to 776.3 ha in size, totalling to 9,559.3 ha. The First Nation have also reserved for themselves the 508.2 ha Last Mountain Lake 80A Indian Reserve. Together with 32 other Treaty 4-signatory First Nations, Muskowekwan First Nation shares the 37.1 ha Treaty Four Reserve Grounds 77, located adjacent to Fort Qu'Appelle.

=== Services ===
First Nation's infrastructure includes a band office and medical clinic, band hall, workshop, maintenance office, water treatment plant and pump house, school and teacherage, and an outdoor rink.
