= Hendon, Saskatchewan =

Community in Saskatchewan, Canada

Hendon
- Organized hamlet
- Location within Saskatchewan Location within Canada
- Coordinates: 51°52′21″N 103°29′37″W
- Country: Canada
- Province: Saskatchewan
- Region: West-central
- Census division: 10
- Rural municipality: Lakeview No. 337

Government
  - Governing body: Hendon Council

Area
  - Total: 0.34 km^{2} (0.13 sq mi)

Population (2016)
  - Total: 20
  - Density: 58.1/km^{2} (150/sq mi)
- Time zone: CST
- Postal code: S0E 0X0
- Area code: 306/639
- Highways: Highway 35, Highway 758
- Railways: Canadian Pacific Railway

Hendon is a hamlet in the Rural Municipality of Lakeview No. 337, Saskatchewan, Canada. Listed as a designated place by Statistics Canada, the hamlet had a population of 20 in the Canada 2016 Census.

== Demographics ==
In the 2021 Census of Population conducted by Statistics Canada, Hendon had a population of 10 living in 6 of its 8 total private dwellings, a change of −50% from its 2016 population of 20. With a land area of 0.28 km^{2} (0.11 sq mi), it had a population density of 35.7/km^{2} (92.5/sq mi) in 2021.

Canada census – Hendon, Saskatchewan community profile

	2016
Population	20 (+ 100.0% from 2011)
Land area	0.34 km^{2} (0.13 sq mi)
Population density	58.1/km^{2} (150/sq mi)
Median age
Private dwellings	8 (total)
Median household income	$N/A

References: 2016

== See also ==
- List of communities in Saskatchewan
- List of hamlets in Saskatchewan
