= Quick Dick McDick =

Canadian comedian and YouTuber

Dickson Delorme (born in 1982), best known by his stage name Quick Dick McDick, is a Canadian farmer, comedian, and YouTuber. He is based in Saskatchewan and produces videos about Canadian politics and farming issues.

== Early life ==
Delorme was born in Maple Creek, Saskatchewan to a father who worked for the Prairie Farm Rehabilitation Administration. When Delorme was four years old, his family moved to Foam Lake, Saskatchewan.

== Career ==
Delorme works as a farmer, based in Tuffnell, Saskatchewan. He previously worked in Albertan oil fields in Brooks and Grande Prairie, mostly as a self-employed truck operator.

His Small Town Comedy Tour toured Saskatchewan in 2021.

He uses the pseudonym Quick Dick McDick on his YouTube channel, where he has over 130,000 subscribers. The channel includes content about farm safety, mental health, and charitable fundraising.

In April 2021, he satirically made a bid to be the governor general of Canada, and in 2022, he shaved off his beard to raise funds for the "Brayden Ottenbreit Close Cuts for Cancer" event.

His 2022 video purportedly about fertiliser sales restrictions in Canada was criticised by Jesse Brown on his Canadaland podcast. Brown stated that Delorme's video headline, "The Canadian Fertilizer Ban," implied that there was a fertiliser ban in Canada, despite the video stating that there was no such ban.
