= Esk, Saskatchewan =

Community in Saskatchewan, Canada

Esk
- Hamlet
- Location within Saskatchewan Location within Canada
- Coordinates: 51°48′35″N 104°50′43″W
- Country: Canada
- Province: Saskatchewan
- Region: Saskatchewan
- Census division: 10
- Rural Municipality: Prairie Rose No. 309

Government
  - Governing body: Prairie Rose Rural Municipality
- Time zone: CST
- Area code: 306
- Highways: Highway 16 Highway 667
- Railways: Canadian Pacific Railway

Esk is an unincorporated community in Rural Municipality of Prairie Rose No. 309, Saskatchewan, Canada. The locality is located at the intersection of Highway 16 and Highway 667, about 135 km (84 mi) east of Saskatoon.

The community is named after the River Esk in Scotland, with the word esk being Celtic for "water". The original settlers of the town were Mennonites, who named the community Gartenland, German for "garden land"; however, the CPR named the town Esk, ignoring the original Mennonite name.

== See also ==
- List of communities in Saskatchewan
