= Raymore, Saskatchewan =

Town in Saskatchewan, Canada

Raymore
- Town
- Location within Saskatchewan Location within Canada
- Coordinates: 51°24′29″N 104°31′42″W
- Country: Canada
- Province: Saskatchewan
- Census division: 10
- Rural municipality: Mount Hope No. 279
- Post office Founded: 1909-03-01
- Incorporated (Town): 1908

Government
  - Mayor: Wendy Bentz
  - Governing body: Raymore Town Council

Area
  - Total: 2.75 km^{2} (1.06 sq mi)
- Elevation: 619 m (2,031 ft)

Population (2011)
  - Total: 568
  - Density: 206.8/km^{2} (536/sq mi)
- Time zone: CST
- Postal code: S0A 3J0
- Area code: 306
- Highways: CanAm Highway / Highway 6 / Highway 15

Raymore is a town in the Canadian province of Saskatchewan, about 110 kilometres (68 mi) north of Regina. Raymore is the administrative headquarters of the Kawacatoose Cree First Nation band government.

== History ==
Prior to the white settlement of the areas that surround and include Raymore, the Touchwood peoples, or pusakawatciwiyiniwak, lived in the area and consisted of four bands, "under the leadership of Kawacatoose (Poorman or Lean Man), Kaneonuskatew (One that walks on four claws or George Gordon), Muscowequan (Hard Quill), and Kisecawchuck (Daystar)."

The Raymore Pioneer Museum (c. 1910–1911) is a Municipal Heritage Property on the Canadian Register of Historic Places.

=== Name ===
According to a collectively-researched 1968 publication on Saskatchewan place name origins, Raymore's modern-day name originates with surveyors working for the Grand Trunk Pacific Railway who named towns and stops along their newly-constructed rail lines in an alphabetic manner. The town is said to be named after, "an employee of the railroad who was working on the construction crew."

=== Settlers ===
Among the earliest white settlers in the first years of the twentieth century were: Richard Watt, Headley and Charles Frost, Wilfred Jones, and Archibald MacLean.

=== Business histories ===
Archibald "Archie" MacLean is credited with operation of the first store in Raymore in the early years of the twentieth century, opening on May 15, 1908, however a store is documented as operating on the Poorman 88 Indian reserve during 1874. Harold E. Martin was Raymore's first druggist. Both Archibald MacLean and Harold Martin arrived at the town site in 1908 to start their respective businesses. James Tate and Harry Golden were some of the town's earliest settler merchants.

Raymore Hotel

Originally three-stories tall, the Raymore Hotel was completed in 1911 by Archibald G. MacLean. By 1916, according to the Canadian Census of Manitoba, Saskatchewan, and Alberta, Americans William Baker (age 55) and his wife Ida (age 48) were proprietors of the Raymore Hotel. William "Bill" Baker, a cigar-smoker, ran the Raymore Hotel, "with the help of two Chinese cooks, a waitress and a porter."

In 1920, William Baker sold the Raymore Hotel to Mah Yuen and Sam Ping who ran the business for over a decade. In 1922, the Raymore Hotel was advertised as "the best hotel between Winnipeg and Saskatoon", and was the site of the "Raymore Moving Picture Show" on Friday and Saturday nights. When, in 1935, the sale of beer became legal "by the glass in hotel bars", Mah Yuen and Sam Ping were unable to obtain the required licence because—as Chinese—they were not enfranchised to vote. In August 1936, John C. "Jack" and Violet "Vi" Morrow purchased the hotel from Mah Yuen and Company and ran it until Jack's death in October 1957, and Vi's sale of the hotel in 1967. Brian Dionne, a past president of the Hotels Association of Saskatchewan, purchased the Raymore Hotel in 1985 and ran it until as recently as 2005.

A fire on February 21, 1956, caused an estimated $40,000 of damage, "gutted the top floor" of the hotel, and resulted in its third storey being demolished.

==== MacLean's Funeral Home ====
As a merchant Archibald MacLean began selling funerary caskets as early as 1911 and, upon recognising demand therefore, subsequently obtained his funeral directing and embalming licence. In May 1963, MacLean sold the Raymore funeral home to R. B. Kirkby. R. B. Kirkby renamed the business the Kirkby Funeral Home and operated it until November 1978, when it became a branch of the Regina-based Helmsing-Forsberg Funeral Chapel.

== Sports and recreation ==
The town of Raymore has an ice rink, curling rink, a swimming pool, golf, and baseball diamonds. Raymore is also home to senior men's hockey as the Raymore Rockets of the Highway Hockey League play there.

== Demographics ==
In the 2021 Census of Population conducted by Statistics Canada, Raymore had a population of 507 living in 233 of its 248 total private dwellings, a change of −11.8% from its 2016 population of 575. With a land area of 2.74 km^{2} (1.06 sq mi), it had a population density of 185.0/km^{2} (479.2/sq mi) in 2021.

Canada census – Raymore community profile

	2021	2016	2011
Population	507 (-11.8% from 2016)	575 (-1.2% from 2011)	568 (--2.2% from 2006)
Land area	2.74 km^{2} (1.06 sq mi)	2.91 km^{2} (1.12 sq mi)	2.75 km^{2} (1.06 sq mi)
Population density	185.2/km^{2} (480/sq mi)	197.7/km^{2} (512/sq mi)	206.8/km^{2} (536/sq mi)
Median age	42.8 (M: 43.2, F: 42)	47.9 (M: 46.1, F: 51.0)	47.9 (M: 45.2, F: 50.8)
Private dwellings	235 (total)	295 (total)	284 (total)
Median household income

References: 2021 2016 2011

== Climate ==
Climate data for Raymore
Month	Jan	Feb	Mar	Apr	May	Jun	Jul	Aug	Sep	Oct	Nov	Dec	Year
Record high °C (°F)	7 (45)	6.5 (43.7)	15.5 (59.9)	30 (86)	36.7 (98.1)	37 (99)	38 (100)	37.8 (100.0)	35.6 (96.1)	28 (82)	20.6 (69.1)	8 (46)	38 (100)
Mean daily maximum °C (°F)	−11.8 (10.8)	−9 (16)	−1.8 (28.8)	9.6 (49.3)	18 (64)	22 (72)	24.7 (76.5)	23.8 (74.8)	16.6 (61.9)	10.3 (50.5)	−2 (28)	−9.8 (14.4)	7.6 (45.7)
Daily mean °C (°F)	−16.9 (1.6)	−14 (7)	−6.5 (20.3)	3.9 (39.0)	11.5 (52.7)	15.6 (60.1)	18.2 (64.8)	17.1 (62.8)	10.6 (51.1)	4.6 (40.3)	−6.2 (20.8)	−14.6 (5.7)	1.9 (35.4)
Mean daily minimum °C (°F)	−21.9 (−7.4)	−19 (−2)	−11.1 (12.0)	−1.8 (28.8)	4.9 (40.8)	9.2 (48.6)	11.6 (52.9)	10.2 (50.4)	4.5 (40.1)	−1.2 (29.8)	−10.4 (13.3)	−19.3 (−2.7)	−3.7 (25.3)
Record low °C (°F)	−45 (−49)	−42.5 (−44.5)	−38 (−36)	−26.7 (−16.1)	−10 (14)	−2.8 (27.0)	1.7 (35.1)	−2.5 (27.5)	−8.3 (17.1)	−22.5 (−8.5)	−34 (−29)	−43 (−45)	−45 (−49)
Average precipitation mm (inches)	13 (0.5)	9.2 (0.36)	14.3 (0.56)	21.4 (0.84)	47.4 (1.87)	66.9 (2.63)	73.3 (2.89)	47.9 (1.89)	37.9 (1.49)	21.1 (0.83)	11.7 (0.46)	16.1 (0.63)	380.3 (14.97)
Source: Environment Canada

== See also ==
- List of communities in Saskatchewan
- List of towns in Saskatchewan
