= Tuffnell =

Community in Saskatchewan, Canada

- Hamlet
- Location of Tuffnell in Saskatchewan Tuffnell (Canada)
- Coordinates: 51.6425°N 103.371389°W
- Country: Canada
- Province: Saskatchewan
- Census division: No. 10
- Rural municipality: Foam Lake No. 276
- Post Office Established: 1907-01-01
- Time zone: CST
- Area code: 306

Tuffnell is a hamlet in the Canadian province of Saskatchewan. Access is from Highway 16.

== History ==
The first post office was established in 1907 under the name of Fountain (with Charles Woodhead as postmaster). The name of the community changed to Tuffnell in 1909.

== Demographics ==
In the 2021 Census of Population conducted by Statistics Canada, Tuffnell had a population of 5 living in 6 of its 9 total private dwellings, a change of −66.7% from its 2016 population of 15. With a land area of 0.17 km^{2} (0.066 sq mi), it had a population density of 29.4/km^{2} (76.2/sq mi) in 2021.

== Notable people ==
- Dickson Delorme, farmer, YouTuber (Quick Dick McDick), comedian

== See also ==
- List of communities in Saskatchewan
