= Nut Mountain =

Community in Saskatchewan, Canada

- Unincorporated community
- Location within Saskatchewan Location within Canada
- Coordinates: 52.127°N 103.379°W
- Country: Canada
- Province: Saskatchewan
- Region: East-central
- Census division: 10
- Rural municipality: Sasman No. 336

Area
  - Total: 0.32 km^{2} (0.12 sq mi)

Population (2016)
  - Total: 10
  - Density: 31.3/km^{2} (81/sq mi)
- Time zone: CST
- Area code: 306
- Highways: Highway 49
- Railways: Canadian National Railway (abandoned)

Nut Mountain is an unincorporated community in the Rural Municipality of Sasman No. 336, Saskatchewan, Canada. Listed as a designated place by Statistics Canada, the community had a population of 10 in the Canada 2016 Census.

== Demographics ==
In the 2021 Census of Population conducted by Statistics Canada, Nut Mountain had a population of 5 living in 3 of its 4 total private dwellings, a change of −50% from its 2016 population of 10. With a land area of 0.34 km^{2} (0.13 sq mi), it had a population density of 14.7/km^{2} (38.1/sq mi) in 2021.

Canada census – Nut Mountain community profile

	2016
Population	10 (0.0% from 2011)
Land area	0.32 km^{2} (0.12 sq mi)
Population density	31.3/km^{2} (81/sq mi)
Median age
Private dwellings	9 (total)
Median household income	$N/A

References: 2016

== Nut Mountain ==
Nut Mountain is a large hill (52°5′N 103°10′W) in the east-central region of Saskatchewan. The mountain and several other nearby landmarks are named after the wild hazel nuts that grow abound in the countryside. The Assiniboine River has its headwaters near the Nut Hills.

== See also ==
- List of communities in Saskatchewan
- List of mountains of Saskatchewan
