= Ottman-Murray Beach =

Community in Saskatchewan, Canada

- Organized hamlet
- Location within Saskatchewan Location within Canada
- Coordinates: 51°49′14″N 103°28′33″W
- Country: Canada
- Province: Saskatchewan
- Region: East-central
- Census division: 10
- Rural municipality: Sasman No. 336

Government
  - Governing body: Ottman-Murray Beach Council

Area
  - Total: 0.60 km^{2} (0.23 sq mi)

Population (2016)
  - Total: 15
  - Density: 24.9/km^{2} (64/sq mi)
- Time zone: CST
- Area code: 306
- Highways: Highway 310

Ottman-Murray Beach is a hamlet in the Canadian province of Saskatchewan. Listed as a designated place by Statistics Canada, the hamlet had a population of 15 in the Canada 2016 Census. It is located on the eastern shore of Fishing Lake.

== Demographics ==
In the 2021 Census of Population conducted by Statistics Canada, Ottman-Murray Beach had a population of 46 living in 18 of its 52 total private dwellings, a change of 206.7% from its 2016 population of 15. With a land area of 0.59 km^{2} (0.23 sq mi), it had a population density of 78.0/km^{2} (201.9/sq mi) in 2021.

Canada census – Ottman-Murray Beach community profile

| | 2016 |
| Population | 15 (- 25.0% from 2011) |
| Land area | 0.60 km^{2} (0.23 sq mi) |
| Population density | 24.9/km^{2} (64/sq mi) |
| Median age |
| Private dwellings | 16 (total) |
| Median household income | $N/A |

References: 2016

== See also ==
- List of communities in Saskatchewan
- List of hamlets in Saskatchewan
