= Rural Municipality of Leroy No. 339 =

Rural municipality in Saskatchewan, Canada

Leroy No. 339 Roach No. 339 (1913–1914) Ayr No. (1914–1931)
- Rural municipality
- Rural Municipality of Leroy No. 339
- Location of the RM of Leroy No. 339 in Saskatchewan
- Coordinates: 52.007°N 104.742°W
- Country: Canada
- Province: Saskatchewan
- Census division: 10
- SARM division: 5
- Formed: January 1, 1913
- Name change: March 14, 1914 (from RM of Roach No. 339)
- Name change: February 27, 1931 (from RM of Ayr No. 339)

Government
  - Reeve: Calvin Buhs
  - Governing body: RM of Leroy No. 339 Council
  - Administrator: Wendy Gowda
  - Office location: Leroy

Area (2016)
  - Land: 839.29 km^{2} (324.05 sq mi)

Population (2016)
  - Total: 502
  - Density: 0.6/km^{2} (1.6/sq mi)
- Time zone: CST
  - Summer (DST): CST
- Area codes: 306 and 639

The Rural Municipality of Leroy No. 339 (2016 population: 502) is a rural municipality (RM) in the Canadian province of Saskatchewan within Census Division No. 10 and SARM Division No. 5. It is located east of Saskatoon.

== History ==
The RM of Roach No. 339 was originally incorporated as a rural municipality on January 1, 1913. Its name was changed to the RM of Ayr No. 339 on March 14, 1914 and then renamed again to the RM of Leroy No. 339 on February 27, 1931.

== Geography ==
=== Communities and localities ===
The following urban municipalities are surrounded by the RM.

Towns

- Leroy

The following unincorporated communities are within the RM.

Localities

- Romance
- Shady Grove
- Sinnett

== Demographics ==
Population history (1981–2016)
Year	Pop.	±%
1981	999	—
1986	867	−13.2%
1991	750	−13.5%
1996	667	−11.1%
2001	637	−4.5%
2006	544	−14.6%
2011	490	−9.9%
2016	502	+2.4%
Source: Statistics Canada via Saskatchewan Bureau of Statistics

In the 2021 Census of Population conducted by Statistics Canada, the RM of Leroy No. 339 had a population of 457 living in 183 of its 202 total private dwellings, a change of −9% from its 2016 population of 502. With a land area of 831.54 km^{2} (321.06 sq mi), it had a population density of 0.5/km^{2} (1.4/sq mi) in 2021.

In the 2016 Census of Population, the RM of Leroy No. 339 recorded a population of 502 living in 200 of its 209 total private dwellings, a 2.4% change from its 2011 population of 490. With a land area of 839.29 km^{2} (324.05 sq mi), it had a population density of 0.6/km^{2} (1.5/sq mi) in 2016.

== Government ==
The RM of Leroy No. 339 is governed by an elected municipal council and an appointed administrator that meets on the second Wednesday of every month. The reeve of the RM is Calvin Buhs while its administrator is Wendy Gowda. The RM's office is located in Leroy.

== Transportation ==
Rail

- Lanigan - Naicam Branch C.P.R—serves Lanigan, Sinnett, Leroy, Romance, Watson, Daphne, Spalding

Roads

- Highway 761—East west highway through RM
- Highway 667—serves Jansen, Saskatchewan and St. Gregor, Saskatchewan north/south through the RM

== See also ==
- List of rural municipalities in Saskatchewan
