= North Shore Fishing Lake =

Community in Saskatchewan, Canada

- Organized hamlet
- Location within Saskatchewan Location within Canada
- Coordinates: 51°50′47″N 103°30′46″W
- Country: Canada
- Province: Saskatchewan
- Region: East-central
- Census division: 10
- Rural municipality: Sasman No. 336

Government
  - Governing body: North Shore Fishing Lake Council

Area
  - Total: 0.60 km^{2} (0.23 sq mi)

Population (2016)
  - Total: 74
  - Density: 123.4/km^{2} (320/sq mi)
- Time zone: CST
- Area code: 306

North Shore Fishing Lake is a hamlet in the Rural Municipality of Sasman No. 336, Saskatchewan, Canada. Listed as a designated place by Statistics Canada, the hamlet had a population of 50 in the Canada 2016 Census. It is located on the north-eastern shore of Fishing Lake.

== Demographics ==
In the 2021 Census of Population conducted by Statistics Canada, North Shore Fishing Lake had a population of 151 living in 70 of its 210 total private dwellings, a change of 104.1% from its 2016 population of 74. With a land area of 0.41 km^{2} (0.16 sq mi), it had a population density of 368.3/km^{2} (953.9/sq mi) in 2021.

Canada census – North Shore Fishing Lake community profile

	2016
Population	74 (+ 60.9% from 2011)
Land area	0.60 km^{2} (0.23 sq mi)
Population density	123.4/km^{2} (320/sq mi)
Median age	60.4 (M: 62.1, F: 59.2)
Private dwellings	208 (total)
Median household income	$N/A

References: 2016

== See also ==
- List of communities in Saskatchewan
- List of hamlets in Saskatchewan
