= Paswegin =

Coordinates: 51°59′29″N 103°58′18″W

Location of Paswegin in Saskatchewan

Paswegin is an unorganized area in Saskatchewan, Canada. It is located at kilometre 199 of highway 5, north of the Quill Lakes.

== Climate ==
Climate data for Paswegin
Month	Jan	Feb	Mar	Apr	May	Jun	Jul	Aug	Sep	Oct	Nov	Dec	Year
Record high °C (°F)	7 (45)	7.5 (45.5)	17 (63)	30 (86)	37 (99)	38 (100)	37.5 (99.5)	36.1 (97.0)	35 (95)	29 (84)	19.4 (66.9)	10 (50)	38 (100)
Mean daily maximum °C (°F)	−13.3 (8.1)	−9.3 (15.3)	−2.5 (27.5)	8.5 (47.3)	17.3 (63.1)	21.5 (70.7)	23.7 (74.7)	23.1 (73.6)	16.7 (62.1)	9.4 (48.9)	−2.8 (27.0)	−10.7 (12.7)	6.8 (44.2)
Daily mean °C (°F)	−18.5 (−1.3)	−14.5 (5.9)	−7.7 (18.1)	2.9 (37.2)	10.8 (51.4)	15.2 (59.4)	17.4 (63.3)	16.4 (61.5)	10.5 (50.9)	3.7 (38.7)	−6.9 (19.6)	−15.5 (4.1)	1.2 (34.2)
Mean daily minimum °C (°F)	−23.6 (−10.5)	−19.7 (−3.5)	−12.8 (9.0)	−2.7 (27.1)	4.2 (39.6)	9 (48)	11 (52)	9.6 (49.3)	4.2 (39.6)	−2 (28)	−44 (−47)	−20.2 (−4.4)	−4.5 (23.9)
Record low °C (°F)	−47.8 (−54.0)	−44 (−47)	−40 (−40)	−36.7 (−34.1)	−13.9 (7.0)	−4.4 (24.1)	−0.6 (30.9)	−5 (23)	−8.9 (16.0)	−24.4 (−11.9)	−36 (−33)	−43.3 (−45.9)	−47.8 (−54.0)
Average precipitation mm (inches)	24.5 (0.96)	18.8 (0.74)	24.2 (0.95)	27.5 (1.08)	45.1 (1.78)	73.7 (2.90)	72.7 (2.86)	61.4 (2.42)	41.8 (1.65)	29.7 (1.17)	22.2 (0.87)	27 (1.1)	468.5 (18.44)
Source: Environment Canada
