= Margo, Saskatchewan =

Village in Saskatchewan, Canada

Village of Margo
- Village
- Location of Margo in Saskatchewan Village of Margo (Canada)
- Coordinates: 51°49′33″N 103°20′13″W
- Country: Canada
- Province: Saskatchewan
- Census division: 10
- Rural municipality: Sasman No. 336
- Post office Founded: 1905-10-16
- Incorporated (Village): N/A
- Incorporated (Town): N/A

Government
  - Mayor: Niel Trach
  - Administrator: Kucheran Faye
  - Governing body: Margo Village Council

Area
  - Total: 0.80 km^{2} (0.31 sq mi)

Population (2006)
  - Total: 90
  - Density: 132.1/km^{2} (342/sq mi)
- Time zone: CST
- Postal code: S0A 2M0
- Area codes: 306/639
- Highways: Highway 5

Margo (2016 population: 83) is a village in the Canadian province of Saskatchewan within the Rural Municipality of Sasman No. 336 and Census Division No. 10.

== History ==
Margo incorporated as a village on April 24, 1911.

== Demographics ==
Population history (1981–2016)
Year	Pop.	±%
1981	153	—
1986	162	+5.9%
1991	151	−6.8%
1996	127	−15.9%
2001	106	−16.5%
2006	90	−15.1%
2011	100	+11.1%
2016	83	−17.0%
Source: Statistics Canada via Saskatchewan Bureau of Statistics

In the 2021 Census of Population conducted by Statistics Canada, Margo had a population of 65 living in 36 of its 58 total private dwellings, a change of −21.7% from its 2016 population of 83. With a land area of 0.71 km^{2} (0.27 sq mi), it had a population density of 91.5/km^{2} (237.1/sq mi) in 2021.

In the 2016 Census of Population, the Village of Margo recorded a population of 83 living in 44 of its 60 total private dwellings, a −20.5% change from its 2011 population of 100. With a land area of 0.8 km^{2} (0.31 sq mi), it had a population density of 103.8/km^{2} (268.7/sq mi) in 2016.

== See also ==
- List of communities in Saskatchewan
- List of villages in Saskatchewan
