= Kawacatoose 88 =

Indian reserve in Saskatchewan, Canada

Coordinates: 51°28′02″N 104°17′51″W

- Indian reserve
- Kawacatoose Indian Reserve No. 88
- Location in Saskatchewan
- First Nation: Kawacatoose
- Country: Canada
- Province: Saskatchewan

Area
  - Total: 4,210.3 ha (10,404 acres)

Kawacatoose 88 is an Indian reserve of the Kawacatoose First Nation in Saskatchewan.

== See also ==
- List of Indian reserves in Saskatchewan
