= Rural Municipality of Prairie Rose No. 309 =

Rural municipality in Saskatchewan, Canada

Prairie Rose No. 309
- Rural municipality
- Rural Municipality of Prairie Rose No. 309
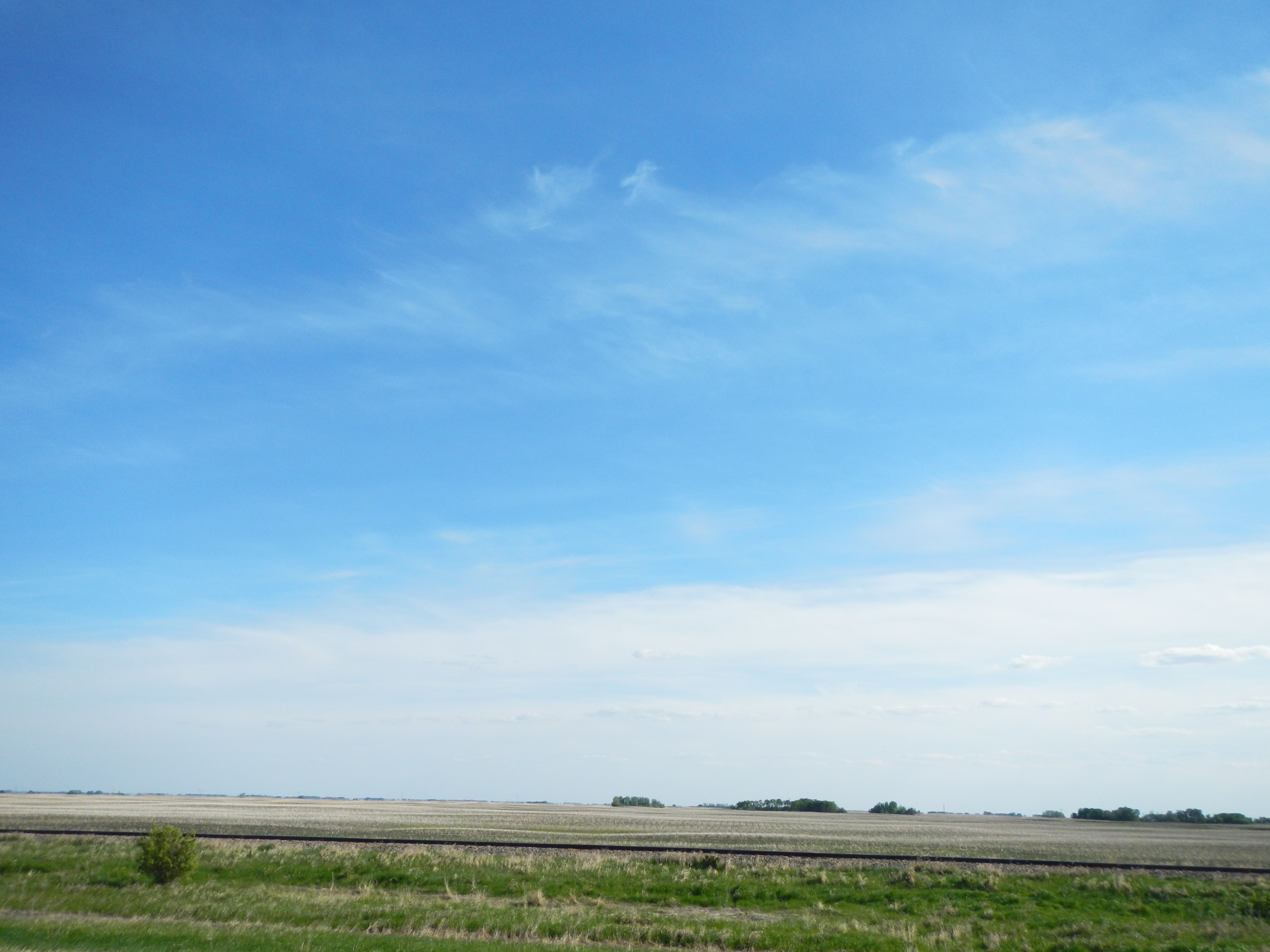
- Field in the RM

- Location of the RM of Prairie Rose No. 309 in Saskatchewan
- Coordinates: 51.760°N 104.689°W
- Country: Canada
- Province: Saskatchewan
- Census division: 10
- SARM division: 5
- Formed: December 12, 1910

Government
  - Reeve: Darin Pedersen
  - Governing body: RM of Prairie Rose No. 309 Council
  - Administrator: Melissa Dieno
  - Office location: Jansen

Area (2016)
  - Land: 839.08 km^{2} (323.97 sq mi)

Population (2016)
  - Total: 220
  - Density: 0.3/km^{2} (0.78/sq mi)
- Time zone: CST
  - Summer (DST): CST
- Area codes: 306 and 639

The Rural Municipality of Prairie Rose No. 309 (2016 population: 220) is a rural municipality (RM) in the Canadian province of Saskatchewan within Census Division No. 10 and SARM Division No. 5. It is located in the central portion of the province.

== History ==
The RM of Prairie Rose No. 309 incorporated as a rural municipality on December 12, 1910.

== Geography ==
=== Communities and localities ===
The following urban municipalities are surrounded by the RM.

Villages

- Jansen

The following unincorporated communities are within the RM.

Localities

- Esk

== Demographics ==
Population history (1981–2016)
Year	Pop.	±%
1981	541	—
1986	492	−9.1%
1991	411	−16.5%
1996	364	−11.4%
2001	345	−5.2%
2006	292	−15.4%
2011	259	−11.3%
2016	220	−15.1%
Source: Statistics Canada via Saskatchewan Bureau of Statistics

In the 2021 Census of Population conducted by Statistics Canada, the RM of Prairie Rose No. 309 had a population of 195 living in 84 of its 96 total private dwellings, a change of −11.4% from its 2016 population of 220. With a land area of 837.66 km^{2} (323.42 sq mi), it had a population density of 0.2/km^{2} (0.6/sq mi) in 2021.

In the 2016 Census of Population, the RM of Prairie Rose No. 309 recorded a population of 220 living in 84 of its 91 total private dwellings, a −15.1% change from its 2011 population of 259. With a land area of 839.08 km^{2} (323.97 sq mi), it had a population density of 0.3/km^{2} (0.7/sq mi) in 2016.

== Government ==
The RM of Prairie Rose No. 309 is governed by an elected municipal council and an appointed administrator that meets on the second Wednesday of every month. The reeve of the RM is Darin Pedersen while its administrator is Melissa Dieno. The RM's office is located in Jansen.

== See also ==
- List of rural municipalities in Saskatchewan
