= Kawacatoose First Nation =

Tribal government in Saskatchewan, Canada

- Band No. 393
- People: Plains Cree
- Treaty: Treaty 4
- Headquarters: Raymore
- Province: Saskatchewan

Land
- Main reserve: Poorman 88
- Reserve: Kawacatoose 88
- Land area: 142.563 km^{2} (55.044 sq mi)

Population (2019)
- On reserve: 1157
- On other land: 1
- Off reserve: 2092
- Total population: 3250

Government
- Chief: Lee-Anne Kehler (First women chief)

Tribal Council
- Touchwood Agency Tribal Council

Website
- kawacatoosefirstnation.ca

The Kawacatoose First Nation (Cree: ᑲᐚᐦᑲᑐᐢ kawâhkatos) is a Plains Cree First Nations band government in Saskatchewan, Canada. Its reserves include:

- Kawacatoose 88
- Last Mountain Lake 80A
- Poorman 88
- Treaty Four Reserve Grounds 77, shared with 32 other bands.

The First Nation is named for Chief Kawacatoose, an original signatory to Treaty 4. His name derives from the Cree kawâhkatoso, "be weak with hunger". Although "hungry skinny man" is a more accurate translation, "poor man" has been used historically and is still the official name of the Poor Man 88 reserve.

== See also ==
- List of Indian reserves in Saskatchewan
