= Rural Municipality of Elfros No. 307 =

Rural municipality in Saskatchewan, Canada

Elfros No. 307
- Rural municipality
- Rural Municipality of Elfros No. 307
- Location of the RM of Elfros No. 307 in Saskatchewan
- Coordinates: 51.741°N 103.886°W
- Country: Canada
- Province: Saskatchewan
- Census division: 10
- SARM division: 4
- Formed: December 13, 1909

Government
  - Reeve: Norman Hall
  - Governing body: RM of Elfros No. 307 Council
  - Administrator: Krista Park
  - Office location: Elfros

Area (2016)
  - Land: 697.34 km^{2} (269.24 sq mi)

Population (2016)
  - Total: 391
  - Density: 0.6/km^{2} (1.6/sq mi)
- Time zone: CST
  - Summer (DST): CST
- Area codes: 306 and 639

The Rural Municipality of Elfros No. 307 (2016 population: 391) is a rural municipality (RM) in the Canadian province of Saskatchewan within Census Division No. 10 and SARM Division No. 4. It is located in the east-central portion of the province.

== History ==
The RM of Elfros No. 307 incorporated as a rural municipality on December 13, 1909.

=== Communities and localities ===
The following urban municipalities are surrounded by the RM.

Villages

- Elfros

The following unincorporated communities are within the RM.

Special service areas

- Leslie

Organized hamlets

- Mozart

== Demographics ==
Population history (1981–2016)
Year	Pop.	±%
1981	724	—
1986	738	+1.9%
1991	684	−7.3%
1996	615	−10.1%
2001	570	−7.3%
2006	481	−15.6%
2011	432	−10.2%
2016	391	−9.5%
Source: Statistics Canada via Saskatchewan Bureau of Statistics

In the 2021 Census of Population conducted by Statistics Canada, the RM of Elfros No. 307 had a population of 373 living in 163 of its 197 total private dwellings, a change of −4.6% from its 2016 population of 391. With a land area of 687.56 km^{2} (265.47 sq mi), it had a population density of 0.5/km^{2} (1.4/sq mi) in 2021.

In the 2016 Census of Population, the RM of Elfros No. 307 recorded a population of 391 living in 172 of its 198 total private dwellings, a −9.5% change from its 2011 population of 432. With a land area of 697.34 km^{2} (269.24 sq mi), it had a population density of 0.6/km^{2} (1.5/sq mi) in 2016.

== Government ==
The RM of Elfros No. 307 is governed by an elected municipal council and an appointed administrator that meets on the second Wednesday of every month. The reeve of the RM is Norman Hall while its administrator is Krista Park. The RM's office is located in Elfros.
