= Doug Trapp =

Canadian ice hockey player

- Born: November 28, 1965 (age 60) Balcarres, Saskatchewan, Canada
- Height: 6 ft 0 in (183 cm)
- Weight: 182 lb (83 kg; 13 st 0 lb)
- Position: Left wing
- Shot: Left
- Played for: Buffalo Sabres
- NHL draft: 39th overall, 1984; Buffalo Sabres
- Playing career: 1985–1987

Doug Trapp (born November 28, 1965, in Balcarres, Saskatchewan) is a former professional ice hockey left wing. He was drafted in the second round, 39th overall, by the Buffalo Sabres in the 1984 NHL entry draft. He played two games in the National Hockey League with Buffalo in the 1986–87 season, going scoreless.

== Personal life ==
Trapp's father Barry and both of Trapp's sons are involved with hockey. Barry began coaching the Regina Pat Blues in the 1980s and as of 2014, is involved with the Toronto Maple Leafs scouting team and Canadian National Junior team. His son Bear played collegiate hockey for the Sacred Heart Pioneers and his youngest son Spencer played for College of the Holy Cross.

== Career statistics ==
=== Regular season and playoffs ===
			Regular season					Playoffs
Season	Team	League	GP	G	A	Pts	PIM	GP	G	A	Pts	PIM
1981–82	Regina Pat Canadians	SMAAAHL	12	11	13	24	—	—	—	—	—	—
1981–82	Regina Pat Blues	SJHL	43	25	28	53	102	—	—	—	—	—
1982–83	Regina Pats	WHL	71	23	28	51	123	5	0	2	2	18
1983–84	Regina Pats	WHL	59	43	50	93	44	23	12	12	24	38
1984–85	Regina Pats	WHL	72	48	60	108	81	8	7	7	14	2
1985–86	Rochester Americans	AHL	75	21	42	63	86	—	—	—	—	—
1986–87	Rochester Americans	AHL	68	27	35	62	80	16	0	9	9	5
1986–87	Buffalo Sabres	NHL	2	0	0	0	0	—	—	—	—	—
1991–92	Balcarres Broncs	HHL	—	52	65	117	—	—	—	—	—	—
1994–95	Fort Qu'Appelle Falcons	QVHL	—	—	—	—	—	—	—	—	—	—
AHL totals			143	48	77	125	166	16	0	9	9	5
NHL totals			2	0	0	0	0	—	—	—	—	—

== Awards ==
- WHL East Second All-Star Team – 1984
