= Muskowekwan 85-15 =

Indian reserve in Saskatchewan, Canada

Coordinates: 51°21′50″N 103°56′10″W

- Indian reserve
- Muskowekwan Indian Reserve No. 85-15
- Location in Saskatchewan
- First Nation: Muskowekwan
- Country: Canada
- Province: Saskatchewan

Area
  - Total: 392.1 ha (969 acres)

Population (2016)
  - Total: 5
  - Density: 1.3/km^{2} (3.3/sq mi)

Muskowekwan 85-15 is an Indian reserve of the Muskowekwan First Nation in Saskatchewan. It is about 6 kilometres (3.7 mi) north of Lestock. In the 2016 Canadian Census, it recorded a population of 5 living in 1 of its 1 total private dwellings.

== See also ==
- List of Indian reserves in Saskatchewan
