= Muskowekwan 85-33 =

Indian reserve in Saskatchewan, Canada

Coordinates: 51°16′00″N 103°58′01″W

- Indian reserve
- Muskowekwan Indian Reserve No. 85-33
- Location in Saskatchewan
- First Nation: Muskowekwan
- Country: Canada
- Province: Saskatchewan

Area
  - Total: 64.8 ha (160 acres)

Population (2016)
  - Total: 0
  - Density: 0.0/km^{2} (0.0/sq mi)

Muskowekwan 85-33 is an Indian reserve of the Muskowekwan First Nation in Saskatchewan. It is about 5 kilometres (3.1 mi) south-west of Lestock. In the 2016 Canadian Census, a population of 0 was recorded in 1 of its 1 total private dwellings.

== See also ==
- List of Indian reserves in Saskatchewan
