= St. John the Evangelist Anglican Church (Foam Lake) =

Coordinates: 51.6418°N 103.5334°W

- St. John the Evangelist Anglican Church
- Location: Foam Lake, Saskatchewan
- Country: Canada
- Denomination: Anglican

History
- Founded: 1911

Architecture
- Groundbreaking: 1910
- Completed: 1911

Administration
- Province: Rupert's Land
- Diocese: Anglican Diocese of Saskatoon

St. John the Evangelist Anglican Church, located at 320 Main Street, Foam Lake, Saskatchewan, Canada is a church of the Anglican Diocese of Saskatoon. The building is designated a municipal historic site, as it was established as a mission in 1911 by the Anglican Diocese of Qu'Appelle. The building has continued as a parish church since being established.
