= Wadena, Saskatchewan =

Town in Saskatchewan, Canada

Wadena
- Town
- Town of Wadena
- Location of Wadena in Saskatchewan Wadena (Canada)
- Coordinates: 51°56′45″N 103°48′05″W
- Country: Canada
- Province: Saskatchewan
- Census division: 10
- Rural municipality (RM): Lakeview No. 337
- Founded: 1906
- Post office established: June 12, 1905
- Incorporated (village): 1910
- Incorporated (town): February 27, 1912

Government
  - Mayor: Marty Byman (Town of Wadena 2026)
  - Chief Administrative Officer: Laura Rudolph
  - Governing body: Wadena Town Council
  - MP Yorkton—Melville: Cathay Wagantall (2025)
  - MLA Kelvington-Wadena: Hugh Nerlien (2020)

Area
  - Land: 2.99 km^{2} (1.15 sq mi)

Population (2021)
  - Total: 1,269
  - Density: 424.4/km^{2} (1,099/sq mi)
- Demonym: Wadenan
- Time zone: UTC-6 (CST)
- Postal code: S0A 4J0
- Area codes: 306 / 639 / 474
- Highways: Highway 5 / Highway 35
- Railways: CNR, CPR
- Waterways: Quill Lakes, Fishing Lake, Milligan Creek
- Website: townofwadena.com

Wadena (/wəˈdiːnə/ wə-DEE-nə) is a town in the Canadian province of Saskatchewan, located east of Saskatoon, north of Fort Qu'Appelle and northwest of Yorkton on the eastern shore of the Quill Lakes. The town is known for its birdwatching and hunting opportunities as Quill Lakes is part of a major flight path. The Wadena and District Museum, located just south of Wadena on Highway 35, also hosts an annual Vintage Day in July.

Wadena is the administrative centre of the Rural Municipality of Lakeview. It is also the administrative headquarters of the Fishing Lake First Nation band government.

The town is named after Wadena, Minnesota, the place of origin of some early settlers of Scandinavian American descent. The town in Minnesota was in turn named after a Chippewa/Saulteaux Chief.

== Demographics ==
In the 2011 Canada Census conducted by Statistics Canada, Wadena's population was 1,306 living within 2.91 square kilometers (1.12 square miles), for a population density of 449.5 people/km^{2} (1,164 people/mi^{2}).

In the 2021 Census of Population conducted by Statistics Canada, Wadena had a population of 1,269 living in 606 of its 677 total private dwellings, a change of −1.5% from its 2016 population of 1,288. With a land area of 2.99 km^{2} (1.15 sq mi), it had a population density of 424.4/km^{2} (1,099.2/sq mi) in 2021.

== Notable people ==
- Pamela Wallin – Canadian radio and television personality, senator
- Keith Magnuson – player, team captain and coach of the NHL's Chicago Black Hawks, born and grew up in Wadena
- General Wayne Eyre
- Leonard Lee – founder of Lee Valley Tools
- Jeffrey Batters Home-Hay - Canadian flying ace and bush pilot

== See also ==
- List of communities in Saskatchewan
- List of place names in Canada of Indigenous origin
- List of towns in Saskatchewan
