= Sabitawasis Beach 89 C-1 =

Indian reserve in Saskatchewan, Canada

Coordinates: 51°51′50″N 103°34′54″W

- Indian reserve
- Sabitawasis Beach Indian Reserve No. 89 C-1
- Location in Saskatchewan
- First Nation: Fishing Lake
- Country: Canada
- Province: Saskatchewan

Area
  - Total: 59.9 ha (148 acres)

Sabitawasis Beach 89 C-1 is an Indian reserve of the Fishing Lake First Nation in Saskatchewan. It is on the northern shore of Fishing Lake.

== See also ==
- List of Indian reserves in Saskatchewan
