= Muskowekwan 85-10 =

Indian reserve in Saskatchewan, Canada

Coordinates: 51°21′55″N 103°58′32″W

- Indian reserve
- Muskowekwan Indian Reserve No. 85-10
- Location in Saskatchewan
- First Nation: Muskowekwan
- Country: Canada
- Province: Saskatchewan

Area
  - Total: 578.6 ha (1,430 acres)

Population (2016)
  - Total: 5
  - Density: 0.86/km^{2} (2.2/sq mi)

Muskowekwan 85-10 is an Indian reserve of the Muskowekwan First Nation in Saskatchewan, Canada. It is about 6 kilometres (3.7 mi) north of Lestock. In the 2016 Canadian Census, it recorded a population of 5 living in 1 of its 2 total private dwellings.

== See also ==
- List of Indian reserves in Saskatchewan
