= Mozart, Saskatchewan =

Coordinates: 51°46′33″N 103°59′39″W

Mozart /ˈmoʊzɑːrt/ is a hamlet south of the Quill Lakes in Saskatchewan, Canada, within Rural Municipality of Elfros No. 307. It was founded in 1909 and named after the Austrian composer Wolfgang Amadeus Mozart. The streets are also named after other famous classical composers.

In the town's name, the z has its normal English sound, rather than the German [ts] used in the composer's name.

The RM of Elfros held centennial celebrations July 24–26, 2009.

In 1991, Mozart's postmaster commemorated the 200th anniversary of the composer's death with a special postmark. In September of that year, the hamlet held a concert at the local hall, featuring several players from the Regina Symphony Orchestra. They performed several works by Wolfgang Amadeus Mozart. The concert was recorded for air on CBC-TV's "Adrienne Clarkson Presents" series. It was also covered as a news story by a crew from CTV's "The Provincial Report" nightly news program.

Mozart was referenced in pop culture on an episode of the syndicated version of Who Wants to Be Millionaire that originally aired on Monday, November 8, 2010. The question's subject dealt with the naming of most of the town's streets after composers.

== Demographics ==
In the 2021 Census of Population conducted by Statistics Canada, Mozart had a population of 28 living in 9 of its 12 total private dwellings, a change of 12% from its 2016 population of 25. With a land area of 0.23 km^{2} (0.089 sq mi), it had a population density of 121.7/km^{2} (315.3/sq mi) in 2021.
