= Muskowekwan 85-26 =

Indian reserve in Saskatchewan, Canada

Coordinates: 51°19′42″N 103°58′12″W

- Indian reserve
- Muskowekwan Indian Reserve No. 85-26
- Location in Saskatchewan
- First Nation: Muskowekwan
- Country: Canada
- Province: Saskatchewan

Area
  - Total: 128.4 ha (317 acres)

Population (2016)
  - Total: 0
  - Density: 0.0/km^{2} (0.0/sq mi)

Muskowekwan 85-26 is an Indian reserve of the Muskowekwan First Nation in Saskatchewan. It is about 64 kilometres (40 mi) north-west of Fort Qu'Appelle. In the 2016 Canadian Census, it recorded a population of 0 living in 0 of its 0 total private dwellings.

== See also ==
- List of Indian reserves in Saskatchewan
