= Rural Municipality of Sasman No. 336 =

Rural municipality in Saskatchewan, Canada

Sasman No. 336
- Rural municipality
- Rural Municipality of Sasman No. 336
- Location of the RM of Sasman No. 336 in Saskatchewan
- Coordinates: 51.904°N 103.498°W
- Country: Canada
- Province: Saskatchewan
- Census division: 10
- SARM division: 4
- Formed: January 1, 1913

Government
  - Reeve: Dwayne Nakrayko
  - Governing body: RM of Sasman No. 336 Council
  - Administrator: Michael Rattray
  - Office location: Kuroki

Area (2016)
  - Land: 1,006.49 km^{2} (388.61 sq mi)

Population (2016)
  - Total: 765
  - Density: 0.8/km^{2} (2.1/sq mi)
- Time zone: CST
  - Summer (DST): CST
- Area codes: 306 and 639

The Rural Municipality of Sasman No. 336 (2016 population: 765) is a rural municipality (RM) in the Canadian province of Saskatchewan within Census Division No. 10 and SARM Division No. 4.

== History ==
The RM of Sasman No. 336 incorporated as a rural municipality on January 1, 1913. The RM's name is a portmanteau of Saskatchewan and Manitoba.

== Geography ==
=== Communities and localities ===
The following urban municipalities are surrounded by the RM.

Villages

- Margo

The following unincorporated communities are within the RM.

Organized hamlets

- Kuroki
- North Shore Fishing Lake
- Ottman-Murray Beach

Localities

- Kylemore
- Nut Mountain

== Demographics ==
Population history (1981–2016)
Year	Pop.	±%
1981	1,433	—
1986	1,372	−4.3%
1991	1,205	−12.2%
1996	1,031	−14.4%
2001	1,004	−2.6%
2006	960	−4.4%
2011	818	−14.8%
2016	765	−6.5%
Source: Statistics Canada via Saskatchewan Bureau of Statistics

In the 2021 Census of Population conducted by Statistics Canada, the RM of Sasman No. 336 had a population of 813 living in 362 of its 607 total private dwellings, a change of 6.3% from its 2016 population of 765. With a land area of 984.26 km^{2} (380.02 sq mi), it had a population density of 0.8/km^{2} (2.1/sq mi) in 2021.

In the 2016 Census of Population, the RM of Sasman No. 336 recorded a population of 765 living in 328 of its 568 total private dwellings, a −6.5% change from its 2011 population of 818. With a land area of 1,006.49 km^{2} (388.61 sq mi), it had a population density of 0.8/km^{2} (2.0/sq mi) in 2016.

== Attractions ==
- Margo Recreation Site (51.8532°N 103.3975°W) — a rest area within a protected wildlife area around Sakwasew Lake. Access is from Highway 5.
- Leslie Beach Regional Park — a park on Fishing Lake.

== Government ==
The RM of Sasman No. 336 is governed by an elected municipal council and an appointed administrator that meets on the second Tuesday of every month. The reeve of the RM is Dwayne Nakrayko while its administrator is Michael Rattray. The RM's office is located in Kuroki.

== Transportation ==
- Saskatchewan Highway 5
- Saskatchewan Highway 38
- Saskatchewan Highway 49
- Saskatchewan Highway 665
- Saskatchewan Highway 755
- Kelvington Airport

== See also ==
- List of rural municipalities in Saskatchewan
- List of geographic names derived from portmanteaus
