= Muskowekwan 85-2A =

Indian reserve in Saskatchewan, Canada

Coordinates: 51°22′08″N 103°56′02″W

- Indian reserve
- Muskowekwan Indian Reserve No. 85-2A
- Location in Saskatchewan
- First Nation: Muskowekwan
- Country: Canada
- Province: Saskatchewan

Area
  - Total: 63.4 ha (157 acres)

Population (2016)
  - Total: 0
  - Density: 0.0/km^{2} (0.0/sq mi)

Muskowekwan 85-2A is an Indian reserve of the Muskowekwan First Nation in Saskatchewan. It is located 10 kilometres northwest of Leross. In the 2016 Canadian Census, it recorded a population of 0.

== See also ==
- List of Indian reserves in Saskatchewan
