= Jansen, Saskatchewan =

Village in Saskatchewan, Canada

Jansen
- Village
- Village of Jansen
- Location of Jansen in Saskatchewan Jansen (Canada)
- Coordinates: 51.783°N 104.717°W
- Country: Canada
- Province: Saskatchewan
- Region: Central
- Census division: 10
- Rural Municipality (RM): Prairie Rose No. 309
- Post office Founded: 1908-07-01

Government
  - Type: Municipal
  - Governing body: Jansen Village Council
  - Mayor: Albert Cardinal
  - Administrator: Melissa Dieno

Area
  - Total: 0.85 km^{2} (0.33 sq mi)

Population (2021)
  - Total: 111
  - Density: 127.6/km^{2} (330/sq mi)
- Time zone: UTC-6 (CST)
- Postal code: S0K 2B0
- Area code: 306
- Highways: Highway 16
- Railways: Canadian Pacific Railway
- Website: Village of Jansen

Jansen (2021 population: 111) is a village in the Canadian province of Saskatchewan within the Rural Municipality of Prairie Rose No. 309 and Census Division No. 10. The village is located along Highway 16, about 150 km east of the city of Saskatoon. Jansen is home to Zion Lutheran Church. It has a Community Hall and Summer Recreation Complex as well as a five-pin bowling alley. The C.M Buckaway Library is Jansen's public library.

Jansen features active Kinsmen and Kinette club. They host bi-annual community suppers called steak frys and celebrate Canada Day with a large event.

== History ==
Jansen incorporated as a village on October 19, 1908. Jansen was named for Nebraska rancher John Jansen.

== Demographics ==
Population history (1981–2016)
Year	Pop.	±%
1981	223	—
1986	214	−4.0%
1991	210	−1.9%
1996	167	−20.5%
2001	158	−5.4%
2006	140	−11.4%
2011	126	−10.0%
2016	96	−23.8%
2021	111	+15.6%
Source: Statistics Canada via Saskatchewan Bureau of Statistics

In the 2021 Census of Population conducted by Statistics Canada, Jansen had a population of 111 living in 57 of its 71 total private dwellings, a change of 15.6% from its 2016 population of 96. With a land area of 0.87 km^{2} (0.34 sq mi), it had a population density of 127.6/km^{2} (330.4/sq mi) in 2021.

In the 2016 Census of Population, the Village of Jansen recorded a population of 96 living in 56 of its 68 total private dwellings, a −23.8% change from its 2011 population of 126. With a land area of 0.85 km^{2} (0.33 sq mi), it had a population density of 112.9/km^{2} (292.5/sq mi) in 2016.

== Education ==
Children are bused to nearby Lanigan for primary and secondary school.

== Notable people ==
- Ken Schinkel, hockey player

== See also ==
- List of communities in Saskatchewan
- List of francophone communities in Saskatchewan
- List of villages in Saskatchewan
