= Fishing Lake 89D1 =

Indian reserve in Saskatchewan, Canada

Coordinates: 51°53′33″N 103°36′24″W

- Indian reserve
- Fishing Lake Indian Reserve No. 89D1
- Location in Saskatchewan
- First Nation: Fishing Lake
- Country: Canada
- Province: Saskatchewan

Area
  - Total: 63.2 ha (156 acres)

Fishing Lake 89D1 is an Indian reserve of the Fishing Lake First Nation in Saskatchewan.

== See also ==
- List of Indian reserves in Saskatchewan
