= Leslie Beach =

- Resort village
- Resort Village of Leslie Beach
- Location within Saskatchewan
- Coordinates: 51.816°N 103.563°W
- Country: Canada
- Province: Saskatchewan
- Census division: 10
- Rural municipality: RM of Foam Lake No. 276
- Incorporated: July 1, 1999

Government
  - Mayor: Roger Nupdal
  - Governing body: Resort Village Council
  - Administrator: Brenda Kipling

Area (2016)
  - Land: 0.56 km^{2} (0.22 sq mi)

Population (2016)
  - Total: 41
  - Density: 17.9/km^{2} (46/sq mi)
- Time zone: CST
  - Summer (DST): CST
- Area codes: 306 and 639
- Waterway(s): Fishing Lake
- Website: Official website

Leslie Beach (2016 population: 41) is a resort village in the Canadian province of Saskatchewan within Census Division No. 10. It is on the shores of Fishing Lake in the Rural Municipality of Foam Lake No. 276.

== History ==
Leslie Beach incorporated as a resort village on July 1, 1999.

== Demographics ==
Population history (1981–2016)
Year	Pop.	±%
1981		—
1986		—
1991		—
1996		—
2001	15	—
2006	30	+100.0%
2011	23	−23.3%
2016	41	+78.3%
Source: Statistics Canada via Saskatchewan Bureau of Statistics

In the 2021 Census of Population conducted by Statistics Canada, Leslie Beach had a population of 110 living in 38 of its 148 total private dwellings, a change of 168.3% from its 2016 population of 41. With a land area of 0.66 km^{2} (0.25 sq mi), it had a population density of 166.7/km^{2} (431.7/sq mi) in 2021.

In the 2016 Census of Population conducted by Statistics Canada, the Resort Village of Leslie Beach recorded a population of 41 living in 21 of its 139 total private dwellings, a 78.3% change from its 2011 population of 23. With a land area of 0.56 km^{2} (0.22 sq mi), it had a population density of 73.2/km^{2} (189.6/sq mi) in 2016.

== Government ==
The Resort Village of Leslie Beach is governed by an elected municipal council and an appointed administrator that meets on the third Tuesday of every month. The mayor is Roger Nupdal and its administrator is Brenda Kipling.

== See also ==
- List of communities in Saskatchewan
- List of francophone communities in Saskatchewan
- List of municipalities in Saskatchewan
- List of resort villages in Saskatchewan
- List of villages in Saskatchewan
- List of summer villages in Alberta
