= Muskowekwan 85-29 =

Indian reserve in Saskatchewan, Canada

Coordinates: 51°15′51″N 103°59′15″W

- Indian reserve
- Muskowekwan Indian Reserve No. 85-29
- Location in Saskatchewan
- First Nation: Muskowekwan
- Country: Canada
- Province: Saskatchewan

Area
  - Total: 193.3 ha (478 acres)

Population (2016)
  - Total: 5
  - Density: 2.6/km^{2} (6.7/sq mi)

Muskowekwan 85-29 is an Indian reserve of the Muskowekwan First Nation in Saskatchewan. It is about 107 kilometres (66 mi) west of Yorkton. In the 2016 Canadian Census, it recorded a population of 5 living in 2 of its 3 total private dwellings.

== See also ==
- List of Indian reserves in Saskatchewan
