= Chorney Beach =

Resort village in Saskatchewan, Canada

- Resort village
- Resort Village of Chorney Beach
- Location within Saskatchewan Location within Canada
- Coordinates: 51.808°N 103.557°W
- Country: Canada
- Province: Saskatchewan
- Census division: 10
- Rural municipality: Foam Lake No. 276
- Incorporated: January 1, 1991

Government
  - Mayor: Peter Olson
  - Governing body: Resort Village Council
  - Clerk: Julie Pendlebury

Area (2016)
  - Land: 0.17 km^{2} (0.066 sq mi)

Population (2016)
  - Total: 24
  - Density: 141.2/km^{2} (366/sq mi)
- Time zone: CST
  - Summer (DST): CST
- Area codes: 306 and 639
- Waterway(s): Fishing Lake

Chorney Beach (2016 population: 24) is a resort village in the Canadian province of Saskatchewan within Census Division No. 10. It is on the shores of Fishing Lake in the Rural Municipality of Foam Lake No. 276.

== History ==
Chorney Beach incorporated as a resort village on January 1, 1991.

== Demographics ==
Population history (1981–2016)
Year	Pop.	±%
1981		—
1986		—
1991	7	—
1996	11	+57.1%
2001	15	+36.4%
2006	21	+40.0%
2011	15	−28.6%
2016	24	+60.0%
Source: Statistics Canada via Saskatchewan Bureau of Statistics

In the 2021 Census of Population conducted by Statistics Canada, Chorney Beach had a population of 51 living in 25 of its 62 total private dwellings, a change of 21.4% from its 2016 population of 42. With a land area of 0.23 km^{2} (0.089 sq mi), it had a population density of 221.7/km^{2} (574.3/sq mi) in 2021.

In the 2016 Census of Population conducted by Statistics Canada, the Resort Village of Chorney Beach recorded a population of 24 living in 14 of its 59 total private dwellings, a 60% change from its 2011 population of 15. With a land area of 0.17 km^{2} (0.066 sq mi), it had a population density of 141.2/km^{2} (365.6/sq mi) in 2016.

== Government ==
The Resort Village of Chorney Beach is governed by an elected municipal council and an appointed clerk. The mayor is Peter Olson.

== See also ==
- List of communities in Saskatchewan
- List of resort villages in Saskatchewan
- List of summer villages in Alberta
