= Rural Municipality of Foam Lake No. 276 =

Rural municipality in Saskatchewan, Canada

Foam Lake No. 276
- Rural municipality
- Rural Municipality of Foam Lake No. 276
- Location of the RM of Foam Lake No. 276 in Saskatchewan
- Coordinates: 51.762°N 103.541°W
- Country: Canada
- Province: Saskatchewan
- Census division: 10
- SARM division: 4
- Formed: December 12, 1910

Government
  - Reeve: Ken Kaban
  - Governing body: RM of Foam Lake No. 276 Council
  - Administrator: Shanna Loeppky
  - Office location: Foam Lake

Area (2016)
  - Land: 1,345.98 km^{2} (519.69 sq mi)

Population (2016)
  - Total: 586
  - Density: 0.4/km^{2} (1.0/sq mi)
- Time zone: CST
  - Summer (DST): CST
- Area codes: 306 and 639

The Rural Municipality of Foam Lake No. 276 (2016 population: 586) is a rural municipality (RM) in the Canadian province of Saskatchewan within Census Division No. 10 and SARM Division No. 4. It is located in the east-central portion of the province.

== History ==
The RM of Foam Lake No. 306 incorporated as a rural municipality on December 12, 1910. It was renumbered when it amalgamated with the RM of Beaver No. 276 on December 31, 1952. The RM had the second highest population density in 1955 for the province.

== Geography ==
=== Communities and localities ===
The following urban municipalities are surrounded by the RM.

Towns

- Foam Lake

Resort villages

- Chorney Beach
- Leslie Beach

The following unincorporated communities are within the RM.

Organized hamlets

- Tuffnell

Localities

- Edmore
- Goudie
- Kristnes
- Layco
- West Bend, (dissolved as a village)
- Winthorpe

== Parks and recreation ==
- Leslie Beach Regional Park — a regional park on the shores of Fishing Lake
- Janusson Wildlife Refuge (51.6833°N 103.5172°W) — a 65 ha (160-acre) wildlife refuge that was established in 1990

== Demographics ==
Population history (1981–2016)
Year	Pop.	±%
1981	1,178	—
1986	1,036	−12.1%
1991	953	−8.0%
1996	838	−12.1%
2001	698	−16.7%
2006	598	−14.3%
2011	587	−1.8%
2016	586	−0.2%
Source: Statistics Canada via Saskatchewan Bureau of Statistics

In the 2021 Census of Population conducted by Statistics Canada, the RM of Foam Lake No. 276 had a population of 532 living in 229 of its 308 total private dwellings, a change of 0.6% from its 2016 population of 529. With a land area of 1,284.41 km^{2} (495.91 sq mi), it had a population density of 0.4/km^{2} (1.1/sq mi) in 2021.

In the 2016 Census of Population, the RM of Foam Lake No. 276 recorded a population of 586 living in 262 of its 443 total private dwellings, a −0.2% change from its 2011 population of 587. With a land area of 1,345.98 km^{2} (519.69 sq mi), it had a population density of 0.4/km^{2} (1.1/sq mi) in 2016.

== Government ==
The RM of Foam Lake No. 276 is governed by an elected municipal council and an appointed administrator that meets on the second Wednesday of every month. The reeve of the RM is Ken Kaban while its administrator is Shanna Loeppky. The RM's office is located in Foam Lake.
