= Muskowekwan 85-28 =

Indian reserve in Saskatchewan, Canada

Coordinates: 51°17′13″N 103°56′56″W

- Indian reserve
- Muskowekwan Indian Reserve No. 85-28
- Location in Saskatchewan
- First Nation: Muskowekwan
- Country: Canada
- Province: Saskatchewan

Area
  - Total: 367.2 ha (907 acres)

Population (2016)
  - Total: 0
  - Density: 0.0/km^{2} (0.0/sq mi)

Muskowekwan 85-28 is an Indian reserve of the Muskowekwan First Nation in Saskatchewan. It is about 105 kilometres (65 mi) west of Yorkton. In the 2016 Canadian Census, it recorded a population of 0 living in 1 of its 1 total private dwellings.

== See also ==
- List of Indian reserves in Saskatchewan
