= Fishing Lake 89A =

Indian reserve in Saskatchewan, Canada

Coordinates: 51°49′49″N 103°34′38″W

- Indian reserve
- Fishing Lake Indian Reserve No. 89A
- Location in Saskatchewan
- First Nation: Fishing Lake
- Country: Canada
- Province: Saskatchewan

Area
  - Total: 254.2 ha (628 acres)

Population (2016)
  - Total: 0
  - Density: 0.0/km^{2} (0.0/sq mi)

Fishing Lake 89A is an Indian reserve of the Fishing Lake First Nation in Saskatchewan, Canada. It is Section 13 and the south-east portion of Section 14, Township 33, Range 12, west of the Second Meridian. In the 2016 Canadian Census, it recorded a population of 0 living in 0 of its 0 total private dwellings.

== See also ==
- List of Indian reserves in Saskatchewan
