= Muskowekwan 85 =

Indian reserve in Saskatchewan, Canada

Coordinates: 51°19′25″N 104°04′57″W

- Indian reserve
- Muskowekwan Indian Reserve No. 85
- Location in Saskatchewan
- First Nation: Muskowekwan
- Country: Canada
- Province: Saskatchewan

Area
  - Total: 7,381.7 ha (18,241 acres)

Population (2016)
  - Total: 436
  - Density: 5.91/km^{2} (15.3/sq mi)
- Community Well-Being Index: 52

Muskowekwan 85 is an Indian reserve of the Muskowekwan First Nation in Saskatchewan. It is about 64 kilometres (40 mi) north-west of Fort Qu'Appelle. In the 2016 Canadian Census, it recorded a population of 436 living in 150 of its 170 total private dwellings. In the same year, its Community Well-Being index was calculated at 52 of 100, compared to 58.4 for the average First Nations community and 77.5 for the average non-Indigenous community.

== See also ==
- List of Indian reserves in Saskatchewan
