= Poorman 88 =

Indian reserve in Saskatchewan, Canada

Coordinates: 51°29′27″N 104°22′50″W

- Indian reserve
- Poorman Indian Reserve No. 88
- Location in Saskatchewan
- First Nation: Kawacatoose
- Country: Canada
- Province: Saskatchewan

Area
  - Total: 10,046 ha (24,820 acres)

Population (2016)
  - Total: 729
  - Density: 7.26/km^{2} (18.8/sq mi)
- Community Well-Being Index: 47

Poorman 88 is an Indian reserve of the Kawacatoose First Nation in Saskatchewan. It is about 87 kilometres (54 mi) north-west of Fort Qu'Appelle. In the 2016 Canadian Census, it recorded a population of 729 living in 172 of its 196 total private dwellings. In the same year, its Community Well-Being index was calculated at 47 of 100, compared to 58.4 for the average First Nations community and 77.5 for the average non-Indigenous community.

== See also ==
- List of Indian reserves in Saskatchewan
