= West Bend, Saskatchewan =

Locality in Saskatchewan, Canada

Coordinates: 51°29′00″N 103°41′02″W

Location of West Bend in Saskatchewan

West Bend is an unincorporated community in Saskatchewan, Canada, near the village of Kelliher. In 1981, it had a population of 25. By 1996 the population had decreased to 7; in 2013, the town had no residents.

== See also ==
- List of communities in Saskatchewan
