= Fishing Lake 89 =

Indian reserve in Saskatchewan, Canada

Coordinates: 51°50′50″N 103°39′40″W

- Indian reserve
- Fishing Lake Indian Reserve No. 89
- Location in Saskatchewan
- First Nation: Fishing Lake
- Country: Canada
- Province: Saskatchewan

Area
  - Total: 3,751.4 ha (9,270 acres)

Population (2016)
  - Total: 406
  - Density: 10.8/km^{2} (28.0/sq mi)
- Community Well-Being Index: 54

Fishing Lake 89 is an Indian reserve of the Fishing Lake First Nation in Saskatchewan. It is 119 kilometres (74 mi) north of Fort Qu'Appelle. In the 2016 Canadian Census, it recorded a population of 406 living in 128 of its 161 total private dwellings. In the same year, its Community Well-Being index was calculated at 54 of 100, compared to 58.4 for the average First Nations community and 77.5 for the average non-Indigenous community.

== See also ==
- List of Indian reserves in Saskatchewan
