= Fishing Lake First Nation =

Ojibwe First Nation in Saskatchewan

- Band No. 390
- Treaty: Treaty 4
- Headquarters: Wadena
- Province: Saskatchewan

Land
- Main reserve: Fishing Lake 89
- Reserves: Fishing Lake 89A; Fishing Lake 89D1; Sabitawasis Beach 89 C-1
- Land area: 50.131 km^{2} (19.356 sq mi)

Population (2019)
- On reserve: 508
- Off reserve: 1334
- Total population: 1842

Government
- Chief: Darcy Wayne Desjarlais, Derek Sunshine, Shirley Wolfe-Keller, Michael Desjarlais, Allen Paquachan, George Kayseas, Mathew Smoke, Joe Young, Arthur Anderson, Percy Severeight, Sabitawasis, Yellowquill

Tribal Council
- Independent; Federation of Sovereign Indigenous Nations Senator Luke James Nanaquetung

Website
- fishinglakefirstnation.com

Fishing Lake First Nation (Ojibwe: Gichi-ginoozhewaaning) is a First Nation of the Saulteaux branch of the Ojibwe nation. Fishing Lake First Nation are Anishinabek people (original people of North America). The band can trace their origins to central Canada, and were pushed westward to avoid encroachment by European settlers. The First Nation was originally part of the Yellow-quill Saulteaux Band, a Treaty Band named after a Treaty 4 signatory Chief Ošāwaškokwanēpi, whose name means "Green/Blue-quill." However, due to "š" merging with "s" in Nakawēmowin (Saulteaux language), this led to a mistranslation of his name as "Yellow-quill"—"yellow" being osāw-, while "green/blue" being ošāwaško- (or osāwasko- in Saulteaux). The band was given three reserves, at Fishing and Nut Lakes (surveyed in September 1881) and Kinistin, Saskatchewan (surveyed in 1900). The Fishing Lake Indian Reserve 89 was approximately 22,850 acres (92.5 km^{2}). Soon after the death of Chief Ošāwaškokwanēpi, the Band divided into three groups, the Fishing Lake First Nation, the Yellow Quill First Nation, and the Kinistin Saulteaux Nation

In 1905 the Canadian Northern Railway Company requested that the northern end of the Fishing Lake Reserve be opened for settlement. The Yellow-quill Saulteaux Band initially refused to surrender the land. In response, the Department of Indian Affairs had the Yellow-quill Saulteaux Band sign an agreement recognizing the three separate reserves as distinct bands. In 1907 the department was able to secure the surrender of 13,170 acres (53.3 km^{2}) from Fishing Lake Indian Reserve 89, dealing directly with the now distinct Fishing Lake First Nation.

Negotiations for the return of the surrendered land began in April 1989 when the band submitted a claim to the Minister of Indian Affairs. During the subsequent inquiry by the Indian Claims Commission it was discovered that as many as three of the individuals who signed the surrender document in 1907 were less than 21 years of age. It was also discovered that the affidavit certifying the surrender was not properly sworn according to the statutory standards in place at the time.

In 2001, a Settlement Agreement was ratified allowing the band to add 13,190 acres (53.4 km^{2}) to the reserve. In addition, band members received $2,000 each, and elders 55 years of age or older received $4,000 apiece. The agreement was worth $35,000,000, and was Saskatchewan's largest land claim. In 2001, the initial Fishing Lake 1907 Trustees were William (Bill) Anderson, Leona Desjarlais, Laverne Knight, Jackie Ottmann, Janelle Bird, Lorraine Lysyshen and Milton Paquachan.

There are presently 1,475 people registered with the Fishing Lake First Nation, of which 405 live on reserve. Their reserves include:.

- Fishing Lake 89
- Fishing Lake 89A
- Fishing Lake 89D1
- Sabitawasis Beach 89 C-1
- Treaty Four Reserve Grounds 77, shared with 32 other bands.

The Fishing Lake First Nation people continue to be economically and self sufficient.
