= Foam Lake =

Town in Saskatchewan, Canada

- Town
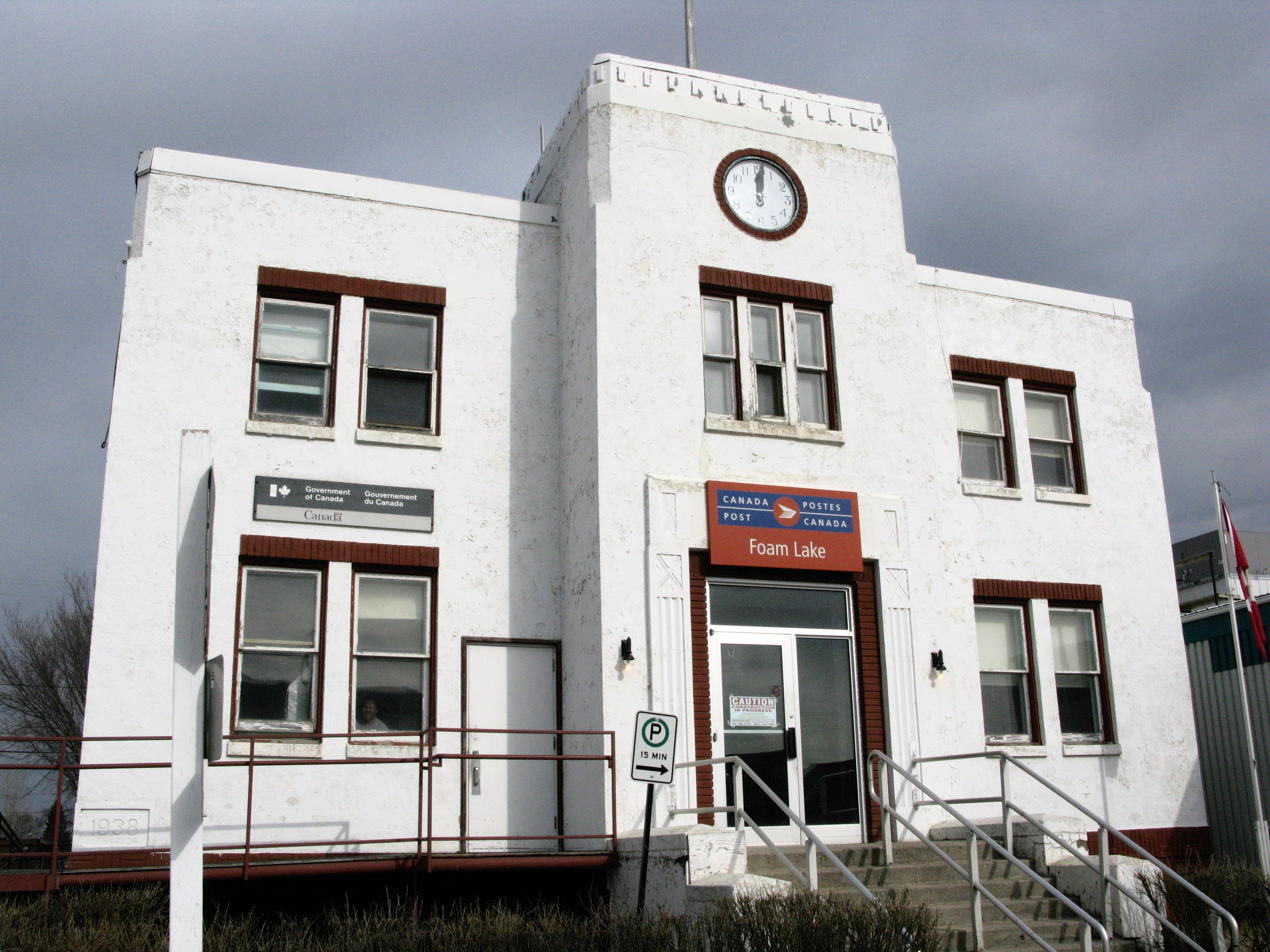
- Foam Lake post office

- Location of Foam Lake Foam Lake (Canada)
- Coordinates: 51°38′28″N 103°32′22″W
- Country: Canada
- Province: Saskatchewan
- Census division: No. 10
- Rural Municipality: Foam Lake
- Settled: 1882
- Incorporated (village): 1908
- Incorporated (town): 1924

Government
  - Mayor: Graham Farrell
  - Town Administrator: Shanna York

Area
  - Total: 6.06 km^{2} (2.34 sq mi)

Population (2016)
  - Total: 1,123
  - Density: 189.4/km^{2} (491/sq mi)
- Time zone: CST
- Postal code: S0A 1A0
- Area code: 306
- Post Office established: 1900
- Website: foamlake.com

Foam Lake is a town in the Canadian province of Saskatchewan. It had a population of 1,123 in 2006. It is located in a mixed agricultural area approximately 220 km south-east of Saskatoon on the Yellowhead Highway. Foam Lake, the lake for which the town is named, is located about 5 kilometres (3.1 mi) to the north-west.

== History ==
Foam Lake was founded in 1882 by Joshua Milligan, an English fur trader. It was subsequently settled by Icelanders, Ukrainians, and various English-speaking nationalities. It was incorporated as a town in 1924.

The Foam Lake Museum (c. 1926) is a Municipal Heritage Property on the Canadian Register of Historic Places.

In the summer of 2006, two major fires destroyed a major part of Main Street in Foam Lake. The first fire destroyed three businesses and one home. These included the water fountain/Sears outlet/Backyard Studios, the doctor's office, and Dennis' Cafe, which was also the owner's home. The second fire started in one of the three grain elevators, burning the first elevator to the ground and spreading to the second one. The volunteer fire department was able to put out the blaze with the help of two water bombers and volunteer fire departments from surrounding communities.

== Demographics ==
In the 2021 Census of Population conducted by Statistics Canada, Foam Lake had a population of 1,183 living in 543 of its 584 total private dwellings, a change of 3.7% from its 2016 population of 1,141. With a land area of 6.04 km^{2} (2.33 sq mi), it had a population density of 195.9/km^{2} (507.3/sq mi) in 2021.

Canada census – Foam Lake community profile

| | 2021 | 2011 |
| Population | 1,183 (+3.7% from 2016) | 1,148 (+2.2% from 2006) |
| Land area | 6.04 km^{2} (2.33 sq mi) | 6.06 km^{2} (2.34 sq mi) |
| Population density | 196/km^{2} (510/sq mi) | 189.4/km^{2} (491/sq mi) |
| Median age | 49.6 (M: 46.8, F: 51.6) | 50.9 (M: 47.9, F: 53.9) |
| Private dwellings | 584 (total) 543 (occupied) | 599 (total) |
| Median household income | $58,000 |

References: 2021 2011

== Sports and recreation ==
Quill Lakes International Bird Area north-west of Foam Lake attracts bird watchers from all over the world. The Foam Lake Water Park features a 128 ft waterslide, hot tub, vortex and beach entry and is the summer hub of the community. Foam Lake's Annual Veselka Ukrainian Heritage Festival occurs each year and celebrates Ukrainian culture through food, music, art, and entertainment.

== Foam Lake Flyers ==
The Foam Lake Flyers of the amateur senior men's Long Lake Hockey League play at the Foam Lake Recreation Centre. They have been in existence since the 1940s. Many notable players and coaches have been a part of this team. Frank "Buzz" Boll coached the team for a few years in the late 1940s. He was a former National Hockey League player. Former Flyers also include Hockey Hall of Fame honoured member Bernie Federko, Canadian Olympian Ted Hargreaves, and many former junior stars including the Washington Capitals draft pick Jeff Lucky.

== Education ==
Foam Lake Elementary School and Foam Lake Composite High School are in the Horizon School Division No. 205. The high school's football team is called the Foam Lake Panthers.

== Notable people ==
- Bernie Federko, professional ice hockey player.
- Pat Elynuik, professional ice hockey player.
- Dennis Polonich, professional ice hockey player.
- Tania Miller, youngest and first female conductor of a major Canadian Symphony Orchestra.
- Bryan Bjarnason represented Kelvington from 1964 to 1969 in the Legislative Assembly of Saskatchewan as a Liberal. Served in the Royal Canadian Air Force during World War II

== See also ==
- List of towns in Saskatchewan
- List of communities in Saskatchewan
- St. John the Evangelist Anglican Church (Foam Lake)
