= Quill Lakes =

Protected lakes in Saskatchewan, Canada

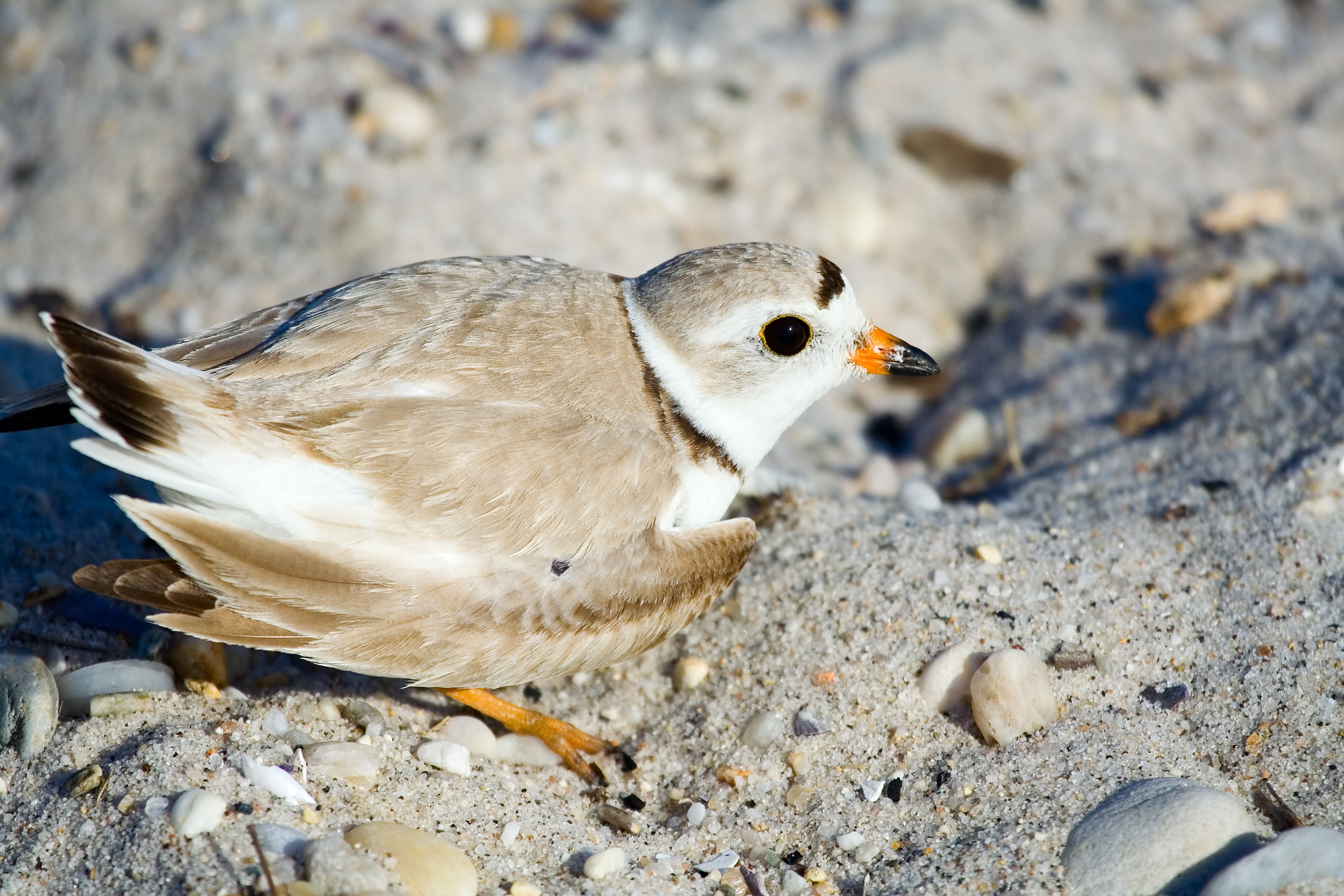
- A piping plover running on a beach
- Interactive map of Quill Lakes
- Coordinates: 51°55′N 104°20′W
- Area: 635 square kilometres (245 sq mi)

Ramsar Wetland
- Designated: 27 May 1987
- Reference no.: 365

Location of Quill Lakes (Big Quill Lake, Middle Quill Lake and Little Quill Lake) in Saskatchewan

The Quill Lakes are a wetland complex in Saskatchewan, Canada that encompasses the endorheic basin of three distinct lake wetlands: Big Quill Lake, Middle Quill Lake, and Little Quill Lake. On May 27, 1987, it was designated a wetland of international importance via the Ramsar Convention. It was the first Canadian site in the North American Waterfowl Management Plan, is a site in the International Biological Programme and Saskatchewan Heritage Marsh Program, and was designated a Western Hemisphere Shorebird Reserve Network site of International significance in May, 1994. The site is an important staging and breeding area for spring and fall migration of shorebirds. The site qualifies as an Important Bird Area (IBA) of Canada for its globally and nationally significant migratory and breeding populations of more than a dozen species of birds. The IBA is designated as Quill Lakes (SK 002).

== Description ==
The lakes were named for bird quills collected near shorelines and shipped to England for use as quill pens. The Quill Lakes are Canada's largest saline lake, covering an area of about 635 square kilometres (245 sq mi). Salinity varies within the lakes and with their water levels, but effectively limits the floral diversity of the region. Located directly north of Regina and east of Saskatoon, it is primarily provincial Crown land administered by the Fish and Wildlife Branch of Saskatchewan Environment.

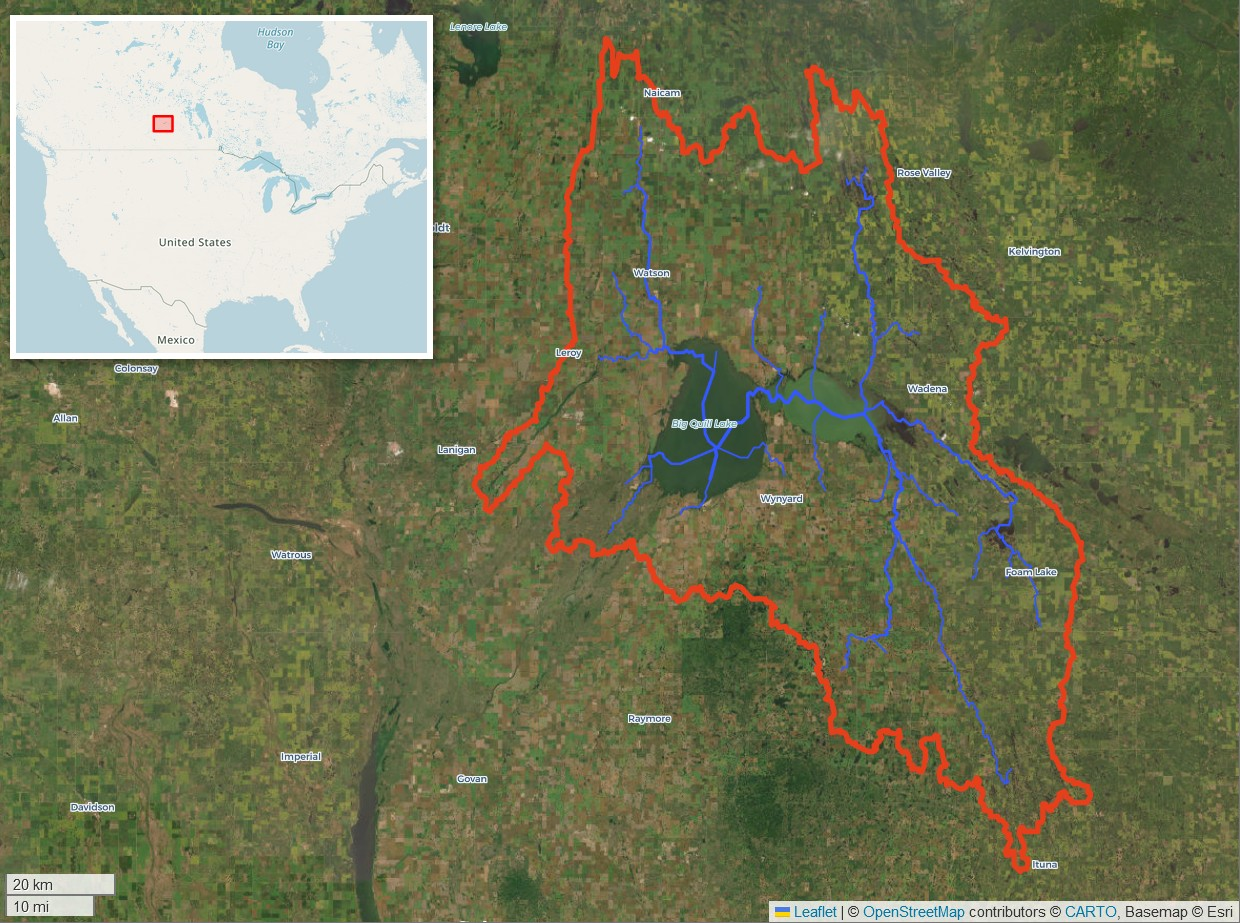
Quill Lakes drainage basin (Interactive map)

The surrounding area, consisting of glacial moraines, is mostly used for agricultural purposes. Big Quill Lake is pear-shaped and approximately 27 kilometres (17 mi) long, measuring 18 kilometres (11 mi) at its widest point. Middle Quill Lake, also known as Mud Lake, is the smallest of the three, about 6 kilometres (3.7 mi) long and 3 kilometres (1.9 mi) wide. Little Quill Lake is 24 kilometres (15 mi) long and 11 kilometres (6.8 mi) wide. The Islands of Middle Quill Lake have been designated as the provincial Mud Lake Wildlife Refuge (51.9333°N 104.2172°W) to protect breeding colonies of American white pelican and double-crested cormorant.

Drought in the surrounding regions results in increased water draw from the lakes, reducing the water level and increasing its salinity. This reduces the breeding habitat for the piping plover. Since 2005, above average precipitation has resulted in widespread flooding and the lake rising 7 metres (23 ft) and in danger of overflowing into the Last Mountain Lake watershed.

== Studies and surveys ==
Various studies have surveyed bird populations at this site. The International Shorebird Survey in 1988 counted 155,000 shorebirds at Big Quill Lake. Surveys between 1989 and 1992 at Middle and Little Quill Lakes found one-day peaks of 101,900 birds. The most comprehensive study conducted, involving all three lakes, resulted in a count of 197,155 birds. The site is an important staging and breeding area for the endangered piping plover. Other species identified throughout the complex include "85,000 geese, 100,000 ducks, [and] 12,000 cranes", as well as black-bellied plover, sanderlings, Hudsonian godwits, red knots, stilt sandpipers, white-rumped sandpipers, semipalmated sandpipers, long-billed dowitchers, red-necked phalaropes, and lesser yellowlegs. Additionally, in the mid-1990s several whooping cranes were observed using the area for staging during fall migration.

== Industry ==
Big Quill Resources (taken over by Sifto Canada in 2011) operates on the shore of Big Quill Lake extracts naturally occurring sulphate from the brine of the lake then combining it with potassium chloride to form sulphate of potash that is then sold as a fertilizer.

== See also ==
- List of lakes of Saskatchewan
- List of protected areas of Saskatchewan
