= Lestock, Saskatchewan =

Community in Saskatchewan, Canada

Lestock
- Special service area
- Lestock in Saskatchewan Lestock (Canada)
- Coordinates: 51°18′42″N 103°58′46″W
- Country: Canada
- Province: Saskatchewan
- Region: Central
- Census division: 10
- Rural municipality: Kellross No. 247
- Incorporated (village): April 17, 1912
- Dissolved (special service area): September 1, 2017

Area
  - Total: 0.87 km^{2} (0.34 sq mi)

Population (2016)
  - Total: 95
  - Density: 109.3/km^{2} (283/sq mi)
- Time zone: UTC-6 (CST)
- Postal code: S0A 2G0
- Area code: 306
- Highways: Highway 15 Highway 639
- Railways: Canadian National Railway
- Website: Village of Lestock

Lestock is a special service area within the Rural Municipality of Kellross No. 247, Saskatchewan, Canada, that held village status prior to September 2017. Lestock had a population of 95 in the 2016 Canada Census, a -24.0% decline from 125 in the 2011 Canada Census.

The community was named after John Lestock Reid, a surveyor for the railway.

== History ==
Lestock was incorporated as a village on April 17, 1912. It restructured on September 1, 2017, relinquishing its village status in favour of becoming a special service area under the jurisdiction of the Rural Municipality of Kellross No. 247.

== Demographics ==
Canada census – Lestock, Saskatchewan community profile

	2016	2011
Population	95 (-24.0% from 2011)	125 (-9.4% from 2006)
Land area	0.87 km^{2} (0.34 sq mi)	0.87 km^{2} (0.34 sq mi)
Population density	187.7/km^{2} (486/sq mi)	182.4/km^{2} (472/sq mi)
Median age	56.8 (M: 61.2, F: 53.0)	51.7 (M: 52.8, F: 50.0)
Private dwellings	98 (total)	76 (total)
Median household income

References: 2016 2011

== See also ==
- List of communities in Saskatchewan
- List of special service areas in Saskatchewan
