= List of neighbourhoods in Prince Albert, Saskatchewan =

Saskatchewan's third largest city Prince Albert has 25 neighbourhoods with some being within others such as Central Business District being within Midtown.

== East ==
- Carlton Park
- Crescent Acres
- Crescent Heights
- Cornerstone Shopping District
- East End
- East Flat
- East Hill
- Hamilton
- Goshen
- Normandy Park
- North Industrial
- Northeast
- River Heights
- Riverview
- South Industrial
- Southwood
- The Yard District

=== Midtown ===
- Central Business District

== West ==
- Hazeldell
- Nordale
- West Flat
- Westview

=== West Hill ===
- Lake's Edge
