= Central Business District, Prince Albert, Saskatchewan =

Prince Albert Downtown Downtown Prince Albert
- Central Business District
- Country: Canada
- Province: Saskatchewan
- City: Prince Albert
- Core Neighbourhood: East and West Side
- Neighbourhood: Midtown

Government
  - Type: Municipal (Ward 2)
  - Administrative body: Prince Albert City Council
  - Councillor: Terra Lennox-Zepp
  - Member of Legislature (MLA): Joe Hargrave (SKP)
  - Member of Parliament (MP): Randy Hoback (CON)

Population
  - Average Income: $
- Time zone: UTC-6 (UTC)
- Postal code: S6V
- Area code: 306

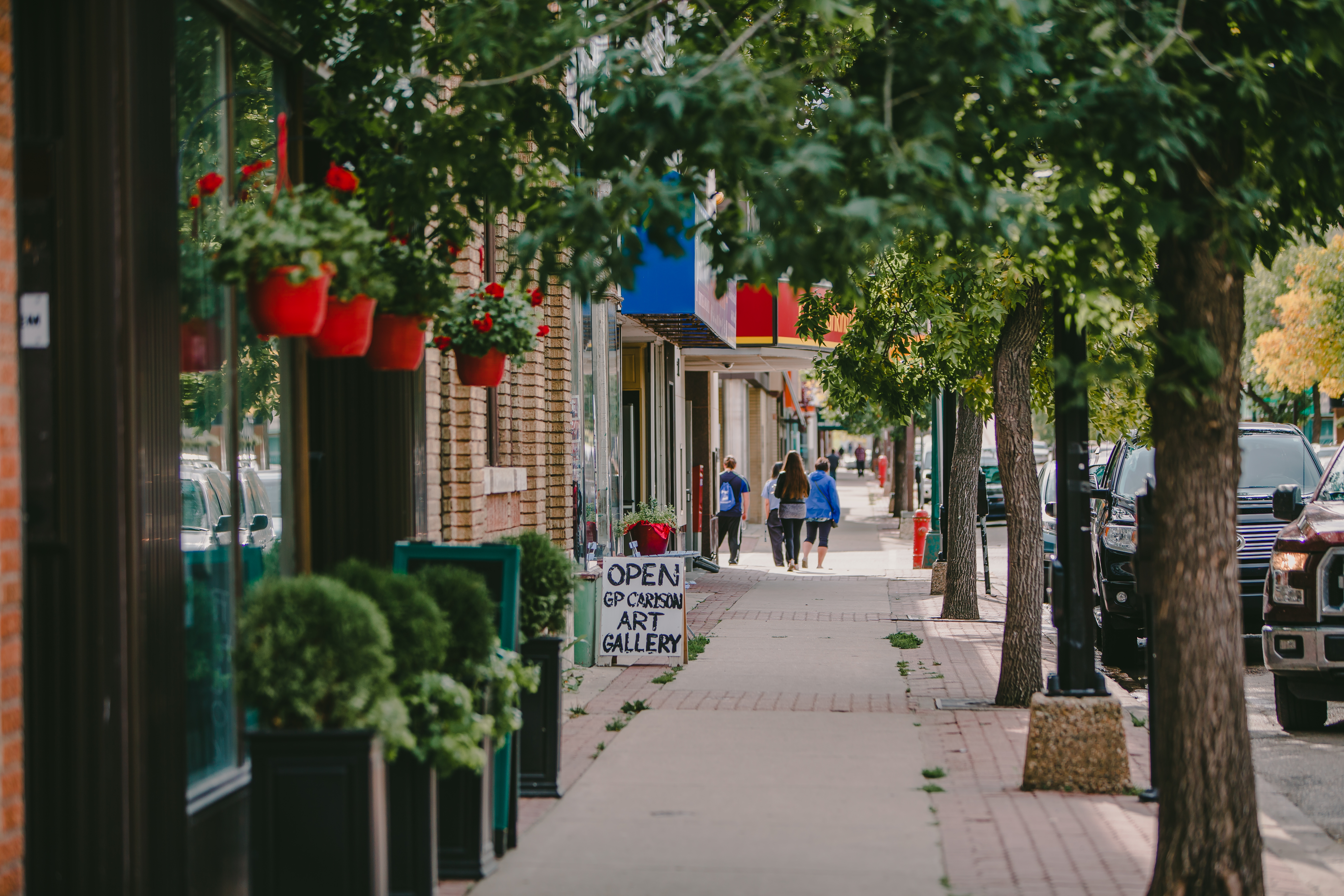
Downtown Prince Albert

The Central Business District or downtown is located in the heart of Prince Albert's downtown core. It is the dominant hub for retail, financial, personal and professional services in the city. Only regional shopping centres are permitted in the area. Many national businesses were housed in the area, but most have moved to other parts of the city.

It is located from 2nd Ave West - Central Avenue and extends between 2nd and 3rd Avenue East. It also goes from 15th Street and goes to River Street. The Central Business District is situated in Midtown. Plus it is home to many local businesses, civil, provincial, and federal government services.

In the downtown of Prince Albert, many buildings are of architectural and historic value and interest still remain. Urban city planners as well as landscape architects have a concept of growth and development for the Prince Albert downtown area which was to come to fruition in 2020.

== Commercial and industrial ==
This area of Prince Albert has very light industrial and much commercial zoning. The downtown core has residential, many locally owned shops and a variety of services.

=== Shopping malls ===
The existing retail areas are being enriched and expanded to provide new investment opportunities and incentive programs for the city.

The Gateway Mall, or North Gate Mall as some refer to it, is the main mall in the area. It houses over 50 shops and businesses. This includes both major chains and local businesses.

MacIntosh Mall houses many government services and local businesses.

== Government and politics ==
In municipal politics, the Central Business District lies within ward 2. Terra Lennox-Zepp is the councillor for the ward.

Provincially, the Central Business District lies within the Prince Albert Carlton riding. Joe Hargrave is the MLA for the riding. He has been MLA since 2016.

Federally, the Central Business District exists within the federal electoral district of Prince Albert. Randy Hoback is the current MP of this riding in which he has been serving since 2008.

== Education ==
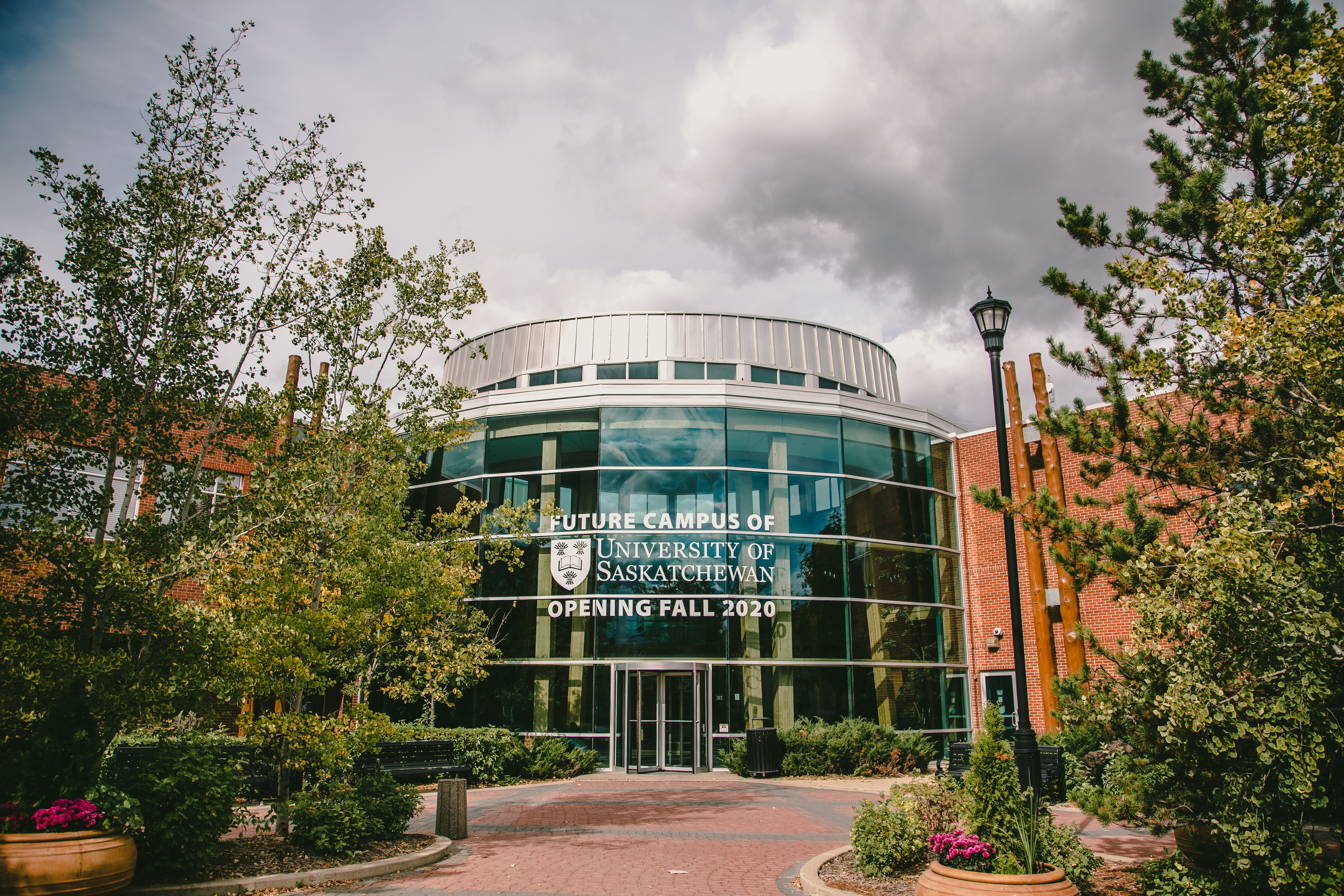
University of Saskatchewan Prince Albert campus

- First Nations University of Canada — 1401 Central Avenue
- SIIT (Saskatchewan Indian Institute of Technology) Prince Albert Campus — 900 - 1st Ave. East
- SUNTEP (Saskatchewan Urban Native Teacher Education Program) — 48-12th Street East
- University of Saskatchewan — Prince Albert campus - Central Ave.

== Events and attractions ==
The E.A. Rawlinson Centre for the Arts houses both the John & Olive Diefenbaker Theatre as well as the Mann Art Gallery. Located in the heart of downtown the centre focuses on highlighting professional visual and performing artists through exhibitions, concerts, musicals, plays, conventions, and fundraising events to Prince Albert and surrounding area.

The Prince Albert Central Business District hosts several events such as

- Christmas shopping
- Downtown Old Fashioned Christmas
- The Downtown Street Fair
- Historical Walking Tour
- Santa Claus Parade

=== Past Events ===
- Founders Day

== Galleries ==
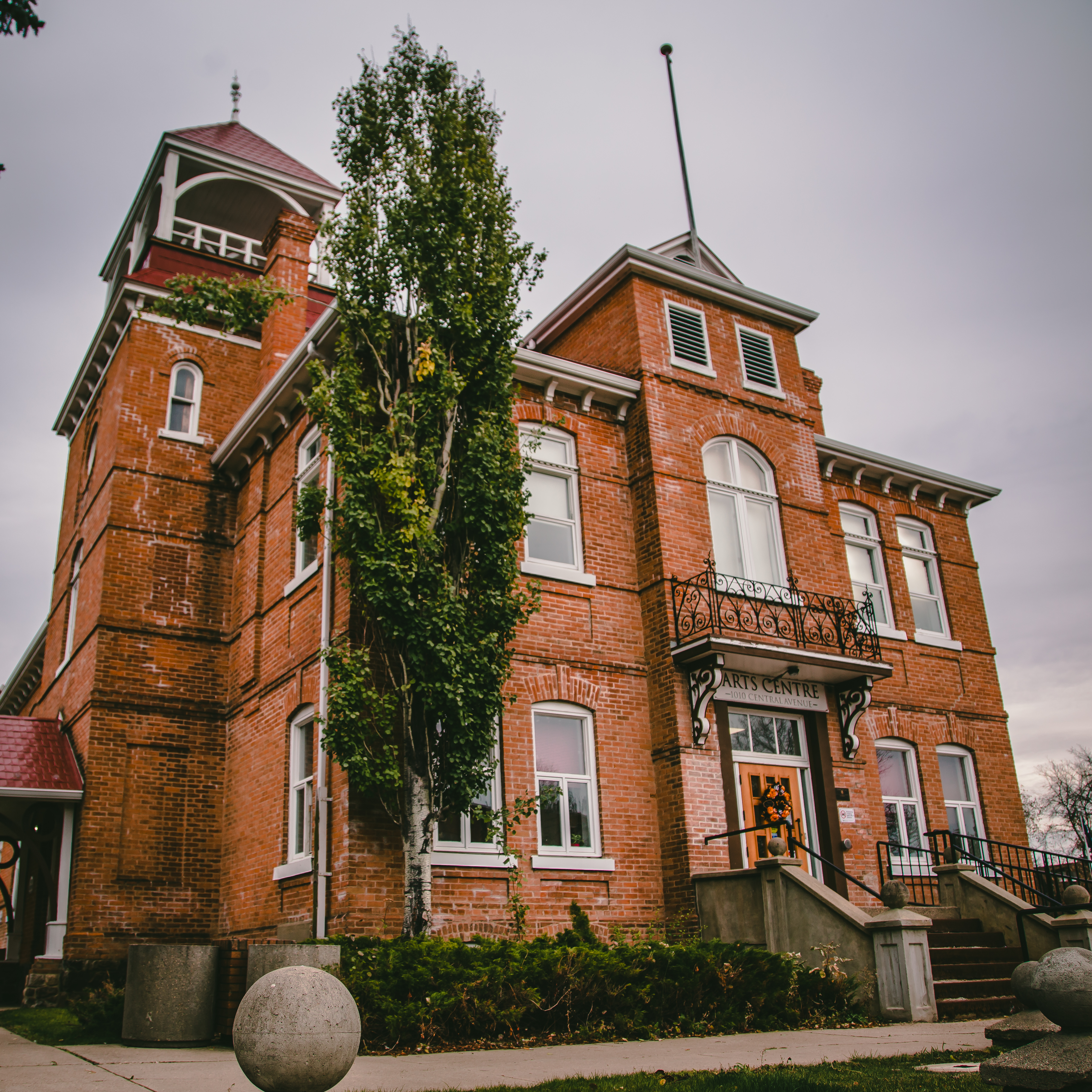
Prince Albert Arts Centre

The Mann Art Gallery (formerly the Art Gallery of Prince Albert) is in the E.A. Rawlinson Centre for the Arts. Overlooking the North Saskatchewan River, the Mann Art Gallery is Prince Albert's premier destination for contemporary and historical art, with exhibitions changing bi-monthly. Housing one of the largest permanent collections in the province, the MAG provides regular curated exhibitions from artists influential in developing arts and culture in the region. It is located at 142 - 12th St. West.

The John V. Hicks Gallery is located on the second floor of the Prince Albert Arts Centre. It showcases many local artists throughout the year.

On the Avenue Artisan Gallery- located on Central Ave featuring local artisans.

The Grace Campbell Art Gallery is located in the John M. Cuelenaere Public Library. The gallery has monthly exhibitions featuring local artists and touring exhibitions.

The Red Door Gallery is located in the Bison Cafe on Central Avenue.

== Features ==
- Memorial Square
- Prince Albert City Hall
- Saskatchewan Forest Centre is located in the downtown core. Prince Albert, the gateway to the north is also renowned for its location on the tree line of Saskatchewan where prairie meets pine. At the crux of the North Saskatchewan River Valley and Pehonan Parkway, northern Saskatchewan has enjoyed economic success with its forestry industry.

== Heritage buildings ==
These heritage sites help to build and maintain a positive identity and historical tourist infrastructure for the Prince Albert business district.

- Blockhouse from the 1885 Rebellion — Located in Kinsmen Park.
- Former Prince Albert City Hall and Opera House was originally built in 1892 when Saskatchewan was known as the NWT. It has been officially proclaimed a municipal heritage property as well as being recognized as one of the National historic sites of Canada. There are not many 19th-century town halls which are still standing today. Currently it is known as the Prince Albert Arts Centre which is located at 1010 Central Avenue.
- The Central Fire Hall which was originally established in 1911, now houses The Prince Albert Historical Museum. This turn of the century fire hall has been designated as Municipal Heritage Site on Central Avenue.
- The Provincial Courthouse of Prince Albert on Central Avenue has also Municipal Heritage Site status.
- The Cathedral Church of St. Alban the Martyr. Significant churches downtown include St. Alban's Anglican Cathedral, St. Paul's Presbyterian Church and Wesley United Church.
- Keyhole Castle
- First Presbyterian Church/School — The church is located in the downtown core and the school is located in Kinsmen Park.

== See also ==
- Central business district
