= Love, Saskatchewan =

Village in Saskatchewan, Canada

Love
- Village
- Village of Love
- Location of Love Love (Canada)
- Coordinates: 53°29′9.44″N 104°10′2.94″W
- Country: Canada
- Province: Saskatchewan
- Census division: 6
- Rural municipality: Torch River No. 488
- Post office Founded: 1935

Government
  - Type: Municipal
  - Governing body: Love Village Council
  - Mayor: Shelley Vallier
  - Administrator: Karly Youzwa

Area
  - Total: 0.46 km^{2} (0.18 sq mi)

Population (2016)
  - Total: 50
  - Density: 108/km^{2} (280/sq mi)
- Time zone: UTC−06:00 (CST)
- Postal code: S0J 1P0
- Area code: 306
- Highways: Highway 56
- Railways: Torch River Rail
- Website: Village of Love (Expired)

Love (2016 population: 50) is a village in the Canadian province of Saskatchewan within the Rural Municipality of Torch River No. 488 and Census Division No. 14. The village is northeast of the city of Prince Albert and about 48 kilometres (30 mi) south of Prince Albert National Park and 16 kilometres (9.9 mi) south of Torch River Provincial Forest.

Love is known for its name and a special postmark, which is a teddy bear holding a heart.

== Demographics ==
Population history (1981–2016)
Year	Pop.	±%
1981	121	—
1986	127	+5.0%
1991	94	−26.0%
1996	83	−11.7%
2001	71	−14.5%
2006	55	−22.5%
2011	65	+18.2%
2016	50	−23.1%
Source: Statistics Canada via Saskatchewan Bureau of Statistics

In the 2021 Census of Population conducted by Statistics Canada, Love had a population of 50 living in 27 of its 35 total private dwellings, a change of 0% from its 2016 population of 50. With a land area of 0.4 km^{2} (0.15 sq mi), it had a population density of 125.0/km^{2} (323.7/sq mi) in 2021.

In the 2016 Census of Population, the Village of Love recorded a population of 50 living in 25 of its 30 total private dwellings, a −30% change from its 2011 population of 65. With a land area of 0.46 km^{2} (0.18 sq mi), it had a population density of 108.7/km^{2} (281.5/sq mi) in 2016.

== History ==
(Information gleaned from the Love history book Love At First Site and interviews with residents.)

In the early years, the village was called Love Siding because of the railroad siding located there. The Canadian Pacific Railway (CPR) had extended its tracks through the area in 1929, building sidings as it moved north and west from Nipawin to White Fox, Love, Garrick and ending in Choiceland. The siding was provided by the CPR for the loading of firewood, pulp, lumber and other forest products, later adding agricultural and dairy products as farming developed.

The village was named after the conductor of the first train to pass through the siding – Tom Love.

Development began in 1934 with the building of a general store by William (Bill) Sears, assisted by Emery Long. In 1935, a Royal Mail Canada post office was established in the store, with Mr. Sears as postmaster.

The first houses were built by Eldon Lamb and Walter and Myrtle Haight and in 1936 Grant and Ray Emery built a general store for Lamb and Earl Johnston who were operating a lumber mill nearby. The population grew as millworkers and lumberjacks moved into the unincorporated community, building homes (usually little more than shacks) for their families. With no official town-site surveyed, the homes were built wherever there was room.

In 1939, the provincial government offered a 35 acres (14 ha) block of land for sale on the east side of the SW‑16‑52‑15‑W2. Because the homeowners wanted title to their property, the Love Development Company was formed to tender a successful bid of $1,200 ($25,600 today) for the entire block. The land was surveyed into a townsite of organized lots, which were sold at $50, $75, and $100. Anyone who already lived on one of the lots had the option of purchasing it.

Love incorporated as a village on June 2, 1945. In July 1945, at the first council meeting for the Village of Love, it was decided that the village would buy out the remaining unsold assets of the Love Development Company.

More lumber mills located in and around the village, which grew to a peak population of approximately 250 by the 1950s, by which time the local timber was becoming depleted and agriculture had grown considerably.

In its heyday the village had two general stores, a hotel with a beer parlour (bar), a pool hall, a couple of cafes, an insurance office, a couple of gas stations which included general auto repair and a few other businesses catering to people involved in the lumber industry.

As farming grew, a United Grain Growers grain elevator had been built in 1947 for the convenience of the farmers in the area. With the building of the large inland grain terminals on the prairies of the Canadian west, the small grain elevators were no longer needed and most, including the one at Love, were demolished. The CPR discontinued service in about 2002 with the closing of the Saskatchewan Wheat Pool elevator at Choiceland. In 2008, a number of local business people and investors purchased the Nipawin to Choiceland tracks, which now operates as the Torch River Rail.

The village has received some international recognition due to its postmark consisting of a teddy bear holding a heart. People from many parts of the world have sent bundles of wedding invitations to the Love post office to be stamped with the romantically oriented post mark and then forwarded to their final destinations.

Connie Kaldor has written a song about the village, which is the title track of her 2014 album Love Sask.

== See also ==
- List of communities in Saskatchewan
- List of villages in Saskatchewan
