= List of school divisions in Saskatchewan =

This is a list of school divisions in Saskatchewan.

There are currently twenty-seven school divisions: eighteen public divisions, eight Roman Catholic Separate School Divisions, and one fransaskois school division.

When Saskatchewan was created in 1905, there were over five thousand school districts in Saskatchewan operating one room school houses. In the 1940s, the provincial government instituted an amalgamation process resulting in larger school units, which greatly reduced the number of school divisions. In 2004, the government announced a further amalgamation process. Seventy-one school divisions were amalgamated into twelve new school divisions and two re-structured school divisions, while thirteen other school divisions were not affected.

School divisions of Saskatchewan
Current divisions Post-amalgamation: January 1 2006	Former divisions Pre-amalgamation: December 31, 2005	Region
Chinook School Division No. 211 (Note: Chinook School Division No. 211 was temporarily named South West School Division No. 211))	Eastend School Division No. 8 Gull Lake School Division No. 76; Herbert School Division No. 79; Herbert, Hodgeville and Morse Attendance Areas; Leader School Division; Maple Creek School Division; Prairie West School Division; Shaunavon School Division; Swift Current Comprehensive Division; Swift Current School Division	2
Christ the Teacher Roman Catholic Separate School Division No. 212 (Note: Christ the Teacher Roman Catholic Separate School Division No. 212 temporarily named the East Central Roman Catholic Separate School Division No. 212))	St. Henry's Roman Catholic Separate School Division; Theodore Roman Catholic Separate School Division No. 138; Yorkton Roman Catholic Separate School Division No. 86	1
Creighton School Division No. 111	Creighton School Division No. 111	7
Division scolaire francophone Division No. 310	Division scolaire francophone Division No. 310	4
Good Spirit School Division No. 204 (Note: Good Spirit School Division No. 204 was temporarily named East Central School Division No. 204))	Eastland Lakes School Division No. 120; Melville Comprehensive School Division No. 128; Melville-Deer Park School Division No. 143; Potashville School Division No. 80; York School Division No. 36	1
Greater Saskatoon Catholic Schools (Note: Greater Saskatoon Catholic Schools called St. Pauls Roman Catholic Separate School Division No. 20)	Humboldt Roman Catholic Separate School Division 15; St. Alphonse Roman Catholic Separate School Division; St. Gabriel Roman Catholic Separate School Division; St. Paul's Roman Catholic Separate School Division	4
Holy Family Roman Catholic Separate School Division No. 140	Holy Family Roman Catholic Separate School Division No. 140	1
Holy Trinity Roman Catholic Separate School Division No. 22	Holy Trinity Roman Catholic Separate School Division No. 22	2
Horizon School Division No. 205	Humboldt Rural School Division No. 47; Humboldt School Division No. 104; Lakeview School Division No. 142; Lanigan School Division No. 40; Sask Central School Division No. 121; Wakaw School Division No. 48; Bruno, Cudworth, and Wakaw Attendance Areas	4
Île-à-la Crosse School Division No. 112	Île-à-la Crosse School Division No. 112	7
Light of Christ Roman Catholic Separate School Division No. 16 (Note: Light of Christ Roman Catholic School Division was temporarily North West Roman Catholic Separate School Division No. 16)	Light of Christ Roman Catholic Separate School Division No. 16	6
Living Sky School Division No. 202 (Note: Living Sky School Division No. 202 was temporarily named Battleford School Division No. 202)	Battlefords School Division No. 118; Landswest School Division No. 123; Biggar School Division No. 50; Cando and Sonningdale Attendance Areas	6
Lloydminster School Division No. 99	Lloydminster School Division No. 99	6
Lloydminster Roman Catholic Separate School Division No. 89	Lloydminster Roman Catholic Separate School Division No. 89	6
North East School Division No. 200	Hudson Bay School Division No. 52; Melfort-Tiger Lily School Division No. 100; Nipawin School Division No. 61; Tisdale School Division No. 53	5
Northern Lights School Division No. 113	Northern Lights School Division No. 113	7
Northwest School Division No. 203 (Note: Northwest School Division was temporarily named North West School Division No. 203)	Battle River School Division No. 60; Meadow Lake School Division No. 66; Turtleford School Division No. 65	6
Prairie South School Division No. 210 (Note: Prairie South School Division No. 210 was temporarily named South Central School Division No. 210)	Borderland School Division No. 68; Davidson School Division No. 31; Craik and Eyebrow Attendance Areas; Golden Plains School Division No. 124; Herbert School Division No. 79; Chaplin and Central Butte Attendance Areas; Moose Jaw School Division No. 1 Red Coat Trail School Division No. 69; Thunder Creek School Division No. 78	3
Prairie Spirit School Division No. 206 (Note: Prairie Spirit School Division No. 206 temporarily named the Saskatoon District School Division No. 206)	Saskatchewan Valley School Division No. 49; Saskatoon (East) School Division No. 41; Saskatoon (West) School Division No. 42	4
Prairie Valley School Division No. 208 (Note: Prairie Valley School Division No. 208 was temporarily named Regina District School Division No. 208)	Aspen Grove School Division No. 144; Grand Coulee School Division No. 110; Gray School Division No. 101; Eslin School Division No. 107; Pense School Division No. 98; Prairie Valley School Division No. 208; Qu'Appelle Valley School Division No. 139; Sunrise School Division No. 1 Lang and Milestone Attendance Areas; Wilcox School Division No. 105	3
Prince Albert Roman Catholic Separate School Division No. 6	Prince Albert Roman Catholic Separate School Division No. 6	5
Regina School Division No. 4	Regina School Division No. 4	3
Regina Roman Catholic Separate School Division No. 81	Regina Roman Catholic Separate School Division No. 81	3
Saskatchewan Rivers School Division No. 119 (Note: Saskatchewan Rivers School Division No. 119 was temporarily named the North Central School Division No. 201)	Prince Albert School Division No. 3 (Note: Saskatchewan Rivers School Division No. 119 was first amalgamated from Prince Albert School Division No. 3, Kinistino School Division No. 55 and Prince Albert Rural School Division No. 56 in 1997 (October 3rd 1997 Gazette Page 1212).); Wakaw School Division No. 48; Kinistino School Division No. 55; Prince Albert Rural School Division No. 56; Parkland School Division No. 63; St. Louis Attendance Area	5
Saskatoon School Division No. 13	Saskatoon School Division No. 13	4
South East Cornerstone School Division No. 209	Estevan Comprehensive School Board; Estevan Rural School Division No. 62; Estevan School Division No. 95; Estevan Spruce Ridge Division; Moosomin School Division No. 9 Souris Moose Mountain School Division No. 122; South Central School Division No. 141; Sunrise School Division No. 145; Ogema, Pangman, Weyburn, Yellow Grass Attendance Areas	1
Sun West School Division No. 207 (Note: Sun West School Division No. 207 was temporarily named West Central School Division No. 207)	Biggar School Division No. 50; Biggar and Landis Attendance Areas; Davidson School Division No. 31; Kenaston and Davidson Attendance Areas; Eston Elrose School Division No. 33; Kindersley School Division No. 34; Outlook School Division No. 32; Rosetown School Division No. 43	4
