= Crescent Acres, Prince Albert, Saskatchewan =

Crescent Acres
- Country: Canada
- Province: Saskatchewan
- City: Prince Albert
- Core Neighbourhood: East Side
- Neighbourhood: Crescent Acres

Government
  - Administrative body: Prince Albert City Council
  - Councillor: Blake Edwards
  - Member of Legislature (MLA): Joe Hargrave (SKP)
  - Member of Parliament (MP): Randy Hoback (CON)

Population
  - Total: 2,515
  - Average Income: $86,538
- Time zone: UTC-6 (UTC)
- Postal code: S6V
- Area code: 306

Crescent Acres is a medium-sized neighbourhood that is located between Marquis Road, 15th Ave E., 15th St. E., 28th St. E., and Olive Diefenbaker Dr.. It extends to the city limits in the east.

According to 2001 statistics, Crescent Acres had a population 2,515. That equals out to being 7.52% of the city's total population. Also, Crescent Acres has 12.95% of its population which are of Aboriginal descent. That equals out to 3.19% of the city's total Aboriginal population.

== Government and politics ==
In municipal politics, Crescent Acres lies within Ward 6. Blake Edwards is the councillor for this ward.

Provincially, Crescent Acres lies within the riding of Prince Albert Carlton. Joe Hargrave is the MLA for the riding in which he has been serving since 2016.

Federally, Crescent Acres exists within the riding of Prince Albert. Randy Hoback is the current MP of this riding in which he has been serving since 2008.

== Education ==
École Vickers School

Location
- 2800 Bradbury Drive; Prince Albert, Canada, Saskatchewan, S6V 7K8

Information
- School type: French Emmersion Elementary
- School board: Saskatchewan Rivers School Division
- Principal: Donalda Hansen
- Grades: K to 8
- Education system: Public
- Sports: Basketball; Track & Field; Volleyball
- Website: Ecole Vickers School

St. Francis School

Location
- 1695 Olive Diefenbaker Dr. Prince Albert, Canada, Saskatchewan, S6V 1B8

Information
- School type: Elementary
- Religious affiliation: Christianity
- Denomination: Catholic
- Opened: November 30, 1987
- School board: Prince Albert Catholic School Division
- Grades: K to 8
- Education system: Catholic
- Sports: Basketball; Track & Field; Volleyball
- Website: St. Francis School

- École Vickers School - 2800 Bradbury Drive
- St. Francis School - 1695 Olive Diefenbaker Dr.
- Wee Care Preschool - 1510 Olive Diefenbaker Dr.

== Recreation ==
- Crescent Acres Park
- Crescent Acres Community Club

== Religion ==
- Cornerstone Free Methodist Church - 2200 15th Ave E.
- Crossroads Pentecostal Assembly - 1510 Olive Diefenbaker Dr.
- Messiah Lutheran Church - 1796 15th Ave. E.
