= Carlton Park =

- Interactive map of Carlton Park
- Coordinates: 53.1842°N 105.7240°W
- Country: Canada
- Province: Saskatchewan
- City: Prince Albert
- Core Neighbourhood: East Side
- Neighbourhood: Carlton Park

Government
  - Type: Municipal (Wards 5 & 6)
  - Administrative body: Prince Albert City Council
  - Councillor: Dennis Ogrodnick (Ward 5)
  - Councillor: Blake Edwards (Ward 6)
  - Member of Legislature (MLA): Joe Hargrave (SKP)
  - Member of Parliament (MP): Randy Hoback (CON)

Population
  - Total: 2,940
  - Average Income: $72,631
- Time zone: UTC-6 (UTC)
- Postal code: S6V
- Area code: 306

Carlton Park is a small neighbourhood that is located between Marquis Road, 6th Avenue East, 28th Street East, and 15th Avenue East. It is part of the east side of Prince Albert.

According to 2001 statistics, Carlton Park had had a population of 2,940, which was 8.79% of the Prince Albert's population. 23.30% of Carlton Park's population is of Aboriginal descent. That equals out to 6.73% of the city's total Aboriginal population.

The government system is run under the three levels of Canada's governmental system. Dennis Ogrodnick and Blake Edwards are the current councillors for wards 5 and 6. Darryl Hickie is the MLA for the Prince Albert Carlton riding. Brian Fitzpatrick is the MP of the Prince Albert riding.

The industrial portion of Carlton Park is non-existent, but is a light commercial area.

Carlton Park is one of the most educated areas of the city. 4.25% for trades and 20.98 for some college education as compared to the rest of the city. 29.73% of the population has some university education compared to the rest of the city. This area has lowest number of non-graduates with a grade nine education.

Sports and recreation is a prominent part of Carlton Park. There are a number of sports facilities that allows a number of sports to be done such as football, soccer, swimming, diving, track and field, among others.

Christianity is the main religion within Carlton Park.

Carlton Park boasts some of the higher rents in the city while housing prices remain average.

Some of the few healthcare services provided in the area is a seniors care home called Mont St. Joseph's Home Inc..

== Government and politics ==
Carlton Park exists within the federal electoral district of Prince Albert. Randy Hoback is the current MP of this riding starting in 2019.

Provincially, Carlton Park lies within the Prince Albert Carlton riding. Darryl Hickie has represented the riding since 2007.

In municipal politics, Carlton Park lies within ward 5 and 6. Dennis Ogrodnick is the councilor for ward 5 which encompasses the commercial parts of the neighbourhood, while the residential parts of the neighbourhood falls largely within ward 6. Blake Ewards is the councilor for ward 6.

== Commercial and industrial ==
Although there is not much for industrial in Carlton Park, there are however commercial establishments and outlets.

== Education ==
Carlton Comprehensive High School

Location
- 665 - 28th Street East; Prince Albert, Canada, Saskatchewan, S6V 1B1

Information
- School type: High School
- School board: Saskatchewan Rivers School Division
- Principal: Jeff Court
- Grades: 9 to 12
- Enrolment: 2251
- Education system: Public
- Sports: Badminton; Basketball; Cross Country Running; Curling; Golf; Football; Soccer; Track & Field; Volleyball; Wrestling
- Mascot: Sader Sam
- Team name: Carlton Crusaders
- Rival: St. Mary Marauders
- Website: Carlton Comprehensive High School

In comparison to the rest of Prince Albert, Carlton Park houses a low number of the population who have less than a grade nine education. In Carlton Park 2.85% of the population have less than a grade nine education compared to 10.31% with the rest of the city. Carlton Park is also comparable in trades and some college education. Carlton Park has 14.25% for trades and 20.98 for some college education respectively whereas the rest of Prince Albert 15.36% for attaining trade certificate or diploma and 21.31% for attaining some college. In terms of attaining some university education, Carlton Park is over 10% that of the rest of the city. Carlton Park boosts a 29.73% in population who have attained some university education while the rest of Prince Albert sits at 19.34% respectively.

In the Carlton Park, there are no elementary schools, but there are accessible elementary schools nearby.

- Carlton Comprehensive High School - Started as Tech, but the name was changed in 1975. The high school is located at 665 - 28th Street East
- Children's Choice Pre-school - 3100 Dunn Drive

== Sports and recreation ==
There are many recreational facilities in the area and are easily accessible:

=== Carlton Park Community Club ===
The Carlton Park Community Club is a multi-purpose hall and meeting facility. The hall includes full kitchen and bar facilities.

Adjacent to the Carlton Park Community Club is a soccer pitch, an outdoor skating rink, and an outdoor pleasure rink.

=== Frank J. Dunn Swimming Pool ===
Frank J. Dunn Swimming Pool is one of two indoor pools within the city. It is located within Carlton Comprehensive High School on 28th Street E. and 6th Avenue E. The City of Prince Albert and the Saskatchewan Rivers School Division jointly operate the pool. The pool is equipped with a five-lane 25 metre pool, ranging in depth from 3.5 to 4.5 feet, and a separate diving tank with one- and three-metre diving boards.

In 1999, during the Western Canada Summer Games, Frank J. Dunn Swimming Pool played host to a portion of the aquatic events such as diving and the swimming races.

=== Prime Minister's Park ===
Prime Minister's Park is a 65-acre (260,000 m^{2}) park located next to Carlton Comprehensive High School and Art Hauser Center. The park boasts two sections which are an active and passive.

==== Active ====
The active area is the sports portion of the park. Prime Minister's Park boasts four lighted tennis courts, three regulation softball diamonds, a baseball diamond, two combination football fields/soccer pitches, and 400 meter track.

In 1999, Prime Minister's park played host to some of the events of the Western Canada Summer Games. Events such as track and field, soccer, softball, baseball, tennis, and field hockey were showcased during the games.

==== Passive ====
The passive area provides greenspace for the surrounding residents of Prime Minister's Park.

=== Arenas ===
==== Art Hauser Centre ====
Formerly known as the Communiplex, it is home to the WHL's Prince Albert Raiders and the Prince Albert Mintos. It was renovated and expanded in 2005 so it can host bigger events such as concerts, sporting events, and trade shows.

== Religion ==
Christianity is the main religion of the residents of Carlton Park.

- First Baptist Church
- Crossroads Pentecostal Church

== Healthcare ==
Mont St. Joseph's Home Inc. - An elderly care home
