= Torch River Rail =

Short line railway in Saskatchewan, Canada

Overview
- Headquarters: Choiceland, Saskatchewan
- Locale: Saskatchewan
- Dates of operation: 2008–

Technical
- Track gauge: 4 ft 8 1/2 in (1,435 mm) standard gauge

The Torch River Rail Inc is a Canadian short line railway company operating on trackage in Saskatchewan, Canada, on the former Canadian Pacific Railway White Fox subdivision, built in 1929, that runs from Nipawin, through White Fox, Love (no railroad siding anymore), Garrick (no siding anymore) to Choiceland.

The Torch River Rail network consists of 45 kilometres (28 mi) of its own trackage. The railway also passes over the Crooked Bridge. From the Crooked Bridge, it interchanges cars with Canadian Pacific Kansas City at Nipawin.
