= Prince Albert City Council =

Governing body

Type
- Type: City Council

History
- Founded: 1885

Leadership
- Mayor of Prince Albert: Bill Powalinsky since November 13, 2024

Structure
- Seats: 9 (8 plus mayor)
- Length of term: 4 years

Elections
- Voting system: FPTP
- Last election: November 13, 2024
- Next election: November 28, 2028

Motto
- Gateway to the North

Meeting place
- Council Chambers, Main Floor, City Hall, 1084 Central Ave, Prince Albert, Saskatchewan

Website
- www.citypa.ca

Prince Albert City Council is the governing body of Prince Albert, Saskatchewan, Canada.

== Composition ==
The council consists of the city's mayor and eight elected city councillors, with city councillors representing the interests of each of the eight wards of the city. The last election for council was in 2024.

== History ==
The council's history dates back to the incorporation of Prince Albert Settlement as a town in 1885, under its first mayor; Thomas McKay. It was also the year, Prince Albert was incorporated as a town.

== Council members ==
=== Mayor ===
Bill Powalinsky is the current mayor of Prince Albert, Saskatchewan and head of the City Council. He was elected in the 2024 civic election having defeated incumbent mayor, Greg Dionne, and mayoral candidate Brittany Marie Smith.

=== Ward 1 ===
Daniel Brown is the current councillor representing Ward 1, which encompasses the West Flat area of the city. Ward 1 currently has the highest percentage of youth of any ward in Prince Albert and is rebranding itself as a vibrant desirable place to live. Ward 1 runs adjacent the North Saskatchewan River and hosts a large portion of the Rotary Trail. He was elected in the 2024 civic election having defeated Larry Vandale. He replaced Charlene Miller, who opted-to not seek re-election.

=== Ward 2 ===
Troy Parenteau is the current councillor representing Ward 2, which encompasses the Historical Cathedral District, Prince Albert's downtown core, as well as Hazedell, Nordale, and the North Industrial district north of the North Saskatchewan River. He was elected in the 2024 civic election having defeated Meghan Mayer. He replaced Terra Lennox-Zepp who opted-to not seek re-election.

=== Ward 3 ===
Tony Head is the current councillor representing Ward 3 which includes the Midtown area of the East Flat portion of the city. He was first elected in the 2020 civic election.

=== Ward 4 ===
Bryce Laewetz is the current councillor representing Ward 4 which encompasses the eastern portion of the East Flat area of the city. He was elected in the 2024 civic election having defeated Perry Trusty. He replaced Don Cody decided who opted to not seek re-election.

=== Ward 5 ===
Stephen Ring is the current councillor representing Ward 5 which encompasses the Crescent Heights area of the city, as well as parts of the Carlton Park neighbourhood. He was elected in the 2024 civic election having defeated Shaun Harris. He replaced Dennis Ogrodnick who opted to not seek re-election.

=== Ward 6 ===
Blake Edwards is the current councillor representing Ward 6 which encompasses the Crescent Acres and Carlton Park neighbourhoods on the east side of the city. He was first elected in the 2016 civic election.

=== Ward 7 ===
Dawn Kilmer is the current councillor representing Ward 7. Ward 7 includes the East Hill neighbourhood of the city. She was first elected in the 2020 civic election.

=== Ward 8 ===
Darren Solomon is the current councillor for Ward 8 which encompasses the West Hill neighbourhood of the city. Solomon was elected in a by-election in 2023 after Ted Zurakowski resigned earlier that year.

== See also ==
- Politics of Saskatchewan
