= Choiceland =

Town in Saskatchewan, Canada

- Town
- Location of Choiceland in Saskatchewan Choiceland (Canada)
- Coordinates: 53.49°N 104.486°W
- Country: Canada
- Province: Saskatchewan
- Rural municipality: Torch River No. 488
- Post office established: 1927

Government
  - Mayor: Rob Mardell
  - Administrator: Erin Delisle

Area
  - Land: 1.12 km^{2} (0.43 sq mi)

Population (2011)
  - Total: 359
  - Density: 321.1/km^{2} (832/sq mi)
- Time zone: UTC−6 (CST)
- Postal code: S0J 0M0
- Area code: 306
- Website: www.choiceland.ca

Choiceland is a town in Saskatchewan, Canada. Choiceland is 100 kilometres (62 mi) east of Prince Albert, a larger Saskatchewan city.

The Torch River Railway is based in Choiceland.

== Education ==
Choiceland is home to William Mason Public School, which offers schooling for grades kindergarten through 12.

== Demographics ==
In the 2021 Census of Population conducted by Statistics Canada, Choiceland had a population of 342 living in 174 of its 204 total private dwellings, a change of −4.7% from its 2016 population of 359. With a land area of 1.06 km^{2} (0.41 sq mi), it had a population density of 322.6/km^{2} (835.6/sq mi) in 2021.

Canada census – Choiceland community profile

	2021	2016	2011
Population	342 (-4.7% from 2016)	359 (-5.8% from 2011)	381 (10.1% from 2006)
Land area	1.06 km^{2} (0.41 sq mi)	1.12 km^{2} (0.43 sq mi)	1.12 km^{2} (0.43 sq mi)
Population density	323.9/km^{2} (839/sq mi)	321.1/km^{2} (832/sq mi)	340.8/km^{2} (883/sq mi)
Median age	47.6 (M: 49.2, F: 47.2)	44.4 (M: 41.1, F: 51.0)	46.6 (M: 44.2, F: 47.2)
Private dwellings	204 (total) 174 (occupied)	204 (total)	210 (total)
Median household income	$52,800	$47,616

References: 2021 2016 2011

== Climate ==
Climate data for Choiceland
Month	Jan	Feb	Mar	Apr	May	Jun	Jul	Aug	Sep	Oct	Nov	Dec	Year
Record high °C (°F)	9 (48)	9.5 (49.1)	16.5 (61.7)	31.7 (89.1)	35 (95)	37 (99)	36.1 (97.0)	36.1 (97.0)	35 (95)	28.3 (82.9)	20.6 (69.1)	8.3 (46.9)	37 (99)
Mean daily maximum °C (°F)	−13.6 (7.5)	−9.4 (15.1)	−1.5 (29.3)	8.6 (47.5)	18.2 (64.8)	22 (72)	24.1 (75.4)	22.8 (73.0)	16.4 (61.5)	8.7 (47.7)	−4.2 (24.4)	−11.9 (10.6)	6.7 (44.1)
Daily mean °C (°F)	−18.7 (−1.7)	−14.9 (5.2)	−7.4 (18.7)	2.7 (36.9)	11.2 (52.2)	15.2 (59.4)	17.4 (63.3)	16 (61)	10 (50)	3.4 (38.1)	−8.4 (16.9)	−16.6 (2.1)	0.8 (33.4)
Mean daily minimum °C (°F)	−23.7 (−10.7)	−20.5 (−4.9)	−13.3 (8.1)	−3.3 (26.1)	4.2 (39.6)	8.3 (46.9)	10.7 (51.3)	9.2 (48.6)	3.6 (38.5)	−2 (28)	−12.6 (9.3)	−21.4 (−6.5)	−5.1 (22.8)
Record low °C (°F)	−47.8 (−54.0)	−45 (−49)	−39.4 (−38.9)	−33.9 (−29.0)	−11.1 (12.0)	−3.3 (26.1)	0 (32)	−3 (27)	−11.1 (12.0)	−25 (−13)	−37.8 (−36.0)	−43 (−45)	−47.8 (−54.0)
Average precipitation mm (inches)	19.7 (0.78)	18.6 (0.73)	20.1 (0.79)	26.7 (1.05)	46.9 (1.85)	82.3 (3.24)	78.2 (3.08)	65.2 (2.57)	52 (2.0)	28.1 (1.11)	22.9 (0.90)	23.2 (0.91)	483.7 (19.04)
Source: Environment Canada

== See also ==
- List of communities in Saskatchewan
- List of towns in Saskatchewan
