= Garrick, Saskatchewan =

Hamlet in Canada

Coordinates: 53°29′33″N 104°20′19″W

Garrick is a hamlet in the Canadian province of Saskatchewan.

== Geography ==
It is in the east-central area of the province on Highway 55, east of Prince Albert.

== Demographics ==
In the 2021 Census of Population conducted by Statistics Canada, Garrick had a population of 15 living in 14 of its 14 total private dwellings, a change of -25% from its 2016 population of 20. With a land area of 0.25 km^{2} (0.097 sq mi), it had a population density of 60.0/km^{2} (155.4/sq mi) in 2021.
