= Keyhole Castle =

Historic building in Prince Albert, Saskatchewan, Canada

Coordinates: 53.19524°N 105.7518°W

General information
- Architectural style: Queen Anne Revival
- Location: 1925 1st Avenue East, Prince Albert, Saskatchewan, Canada
- Construction started: 1910
- Completed: 1913
- Client: Samuel McLeod

Technical details
- Size: 1,219 square meters

Design and construction
- Architect: Erich Wohann

National Historic Site of Canada
- Official name: Keyhole Castle National Historic Site of Canada
- Designated: 1975

The Keyhole Castle is located in the East Hill neighbourhood of Prince Albert, Saskatchewan, Canada. It was built as the residence for Samuel McLeod, a former businessman, mayor of Prince Albert and federal politician. Architect Erich Wohann of Minneapolis designed the building, with construction ending in 1913. In 1975, the Keyhole Castle was designated a National Historic Site of Canada. The building contains a ballroom on the top floor.

Samuel McLeod was a successful businessman, and mayor of Prince Albert mayor both in 1886 and in 1919. The institute for stained glass in Canada has documented the stained glass at Keyhole Castle.

Keyhole Castle is currently a Bed & Breakfast. The Castle is also available as an event location, using either the ballroom, dining room, or, in the summer, the yard.
