= Margo Fournier Arts Centre =

Historic building in Saskatchewan, Canada

Former Prince Albert City Hall
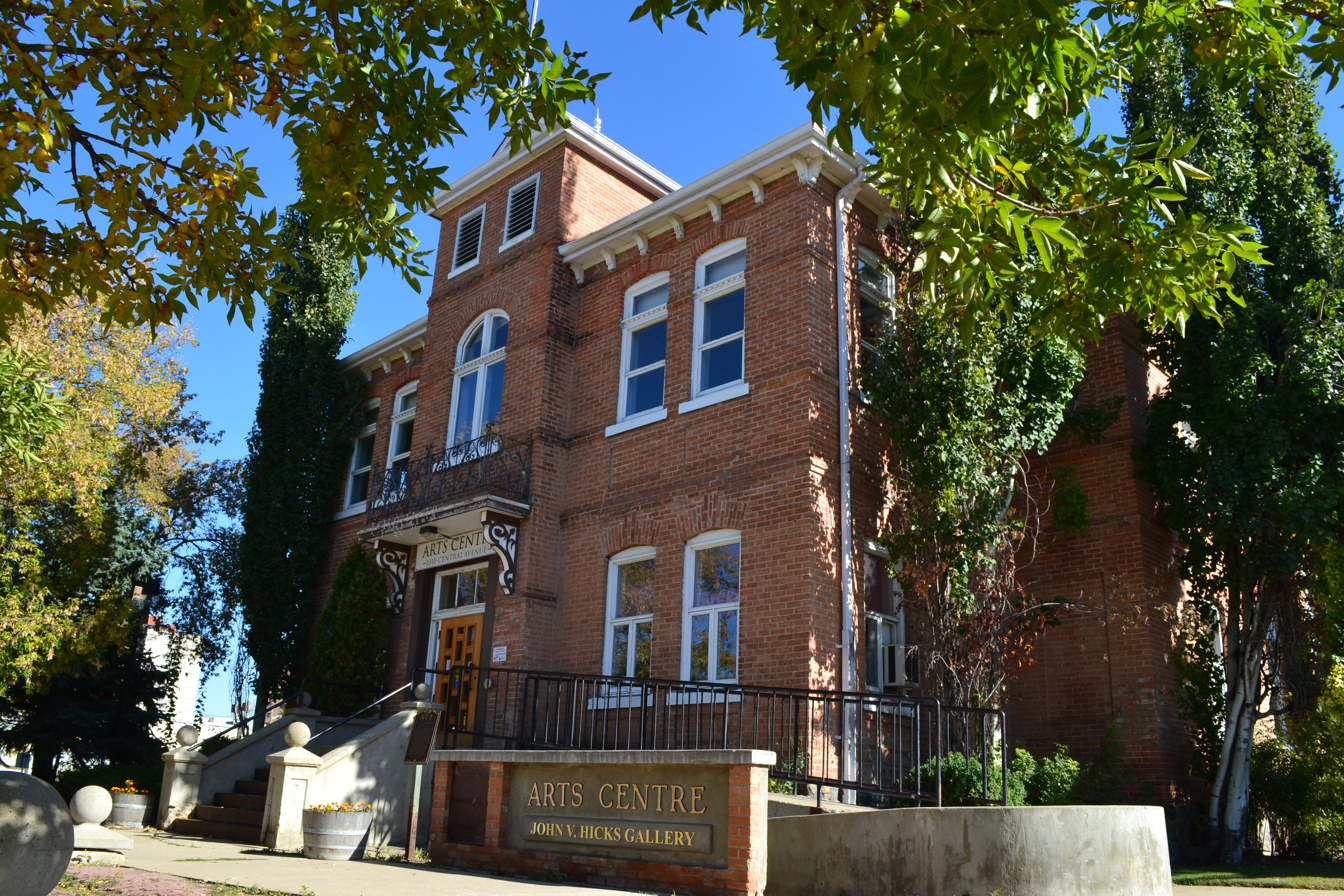
- Interactive map of the Former Prince Albert City Hall area

General information
- Architectural style: Victorian design, Italian accents
- Location: Prince Albert, Saskatchewan, Canada
- Coordinates: 53°12′07″N 105°45′31″W
- Construction started: 1892
- Completed: 1893
- Demolished: preserved

Design and construction
- Engineer: A. and W.B. Goodfellow Builders

Website
- Prince Albert Arts Centre

National Historic Site of Canada
- Official name: Former Prince Albert City Hall National Historic Site of Canada
- Designated: 1984

The Margo Fournier Arts Centre, formerly Prince Albert City Hall and Prince Albert Arts Centre, is a National Historic Site of Canada. It is located at 1010 Central Ave., Prince Albert, Saskatchewan, Canada. Construction on this city hall started in 1892 and was completed in 1893. A. and W.B. Goodfellow Builders built the city hall with a clock tower, opera house, and meeting room.

As well as being a heritage site, it is still in operation today as the Margo Fournier Arts Centre for a variety of arts and culture opportunities, arts guilds, a community pottery studio, and the John V. Hicks Gallery for exhibitions, which feature local and regional art exhibitions coordinated by the Prince Albert Council for the Arts. Between 1911 and 1937, the old City Hall helped to house the Prince Albert Public Library in its upstairs rooms.
