= Prince Albert Catholic School Division =

School district in Saskatchewan, Canada

Coordinates: 53.2033°N 105.7504°W

The Prince Albert Roman Catholic School Division is the host of nine schools in the Prince Albert urban area. It offers education in both French immersion and English on the elementary and high school level. It used to have an all-girl junior/high school facility, as well as an alternative education program. There are three community schools in this division as well. The current Director of Education is Ms. Lorel Tumier.

This school division puts a strong focus on Christian values without compromising educational integrity. Although it is a Christian division it does not expect its students to be of Christian background in their high school facilities. It does however demand that students participate in all school activities including Christian-related ones. In the Education Act of 1978, it was outlined that students of non-Catholic backgrounds were legally allowed to attend high school programs of Christian faith.

Among this division is the most high tech high school facility in the city: St. Mary High School. This high school has recently gone through a massive remodeling that ensures the facility will have a smooth integration into the future.

The Prince Albert Roman Catholic School Division and Saskatchewan Rivers School Division #119 are both involved in Prince Albert alternative education programs.

== French Immersion (Elementary) ==
- École St. Anne (Grades K-8, although only up to Grades 8 for French.)
- École Holy Cross (Grades K-8)

== Community Schools (Elementary) ==
- St. Catherine’s formerly W.F.A. Turgeon (Grades K-6)
- St. John (Grades K-8)
- St. Michael (Grade K-8)

== Elementary schools ==
- St. Francis (Grades K-8)
- St. John (Grades pre-k-8)

== High schools ==
- École St. Mary High School (Grades 9-12)
  - French immersion is offered from grades 9-12
  - The school crest includes the motto: "Semper Veritas" (Latin for "Ever-True")
  - The school is designated as a Community School.

== Alternative Facility/Programs ==
- Junior Lucy Baker Program (Defunct)
  - A school for students showing reluctance, social skill problems, and other related issues that invade learning abilities.
- T.E.A.M program
  - This is a behaviour modification program that provides services like counseling, family support and necessary instruction, so that students with behaviour/social difficulties can properly integrate into a normal school environment. This program is active at the middle years and elementary levels.
