= Saskatchewan Rivers School Division =

School district in Prince Albert, Saskatchewan

The Saskatchewan Rivers School Division #119 comprises 33 schools in the Prince Albert, Saskatchewan area. This division has over 8,300 students enrolled, with 365 support personnel, 475 teachers, and 88 division owned buses (2200 kids ride the bus every day). There are a total of 14 microwave towers in the rural centres of the district, which ensure that rural students have access to high speed networking. There are six community schools, and three schools providing French immersion. A police liaison program is provided in the urban centre where the officer has a school office. This division contains the largest high school in Saskatchewan: Carlton Comprehensive High School (operating since 1975). The division is located mainly in the Aspen parkland and boreal forest biomes, and is named for the North Saskatchewan, South Saskatchewan, and Saskatchewan Rivers which are all found in the area it encompasses.

Prior to 1997, the Saskatchewan Rivers School Division was two separate divisions. There were the rural elementaries and Wesmor as the high school for all rural kids (Rural Division). And there was the urban division which had only Carlton for its high school. Since then the divisions have merged and a new high school was created: PACI (Prince Albert Central Institute). The division also merged in the small communities: Christopher Lake, Meath Park, Birch Hills and Kinistino. Following the break-up of the Wakaw School Division, St. Louis school also joined Saskatchewan Rivers. The Parkland School Division #63 out of Shellbrook also merged into Sask Rivers welcoming the communities of Shellbrook, Canwood, Debden & Big River. There are also two programs for minorities: the Wonska High School for Aboriginal students and the Star Program for kids with social difficulties. In this division schools can be split into four categories: Elementary, Junior High, Integrated (all grades), and High School.

Both the Prince Albert Catholic School Division and this division are involved in Prince Albert alternative education programs.

== Elementary schools ==
- Arthur Pechey School (Enrolled: 255)
- Christopher Lake School (Enrolled: 124)
- East Central School (Enrolled: 103)
- Ecole Vickers School (Enrolled: 423)
- John Diefenbaker School (Enrolled: 394)
- King George Community School (Enrolled: 232)
- Osborne School (Enrolled: 82)
- Princess Margaret School (Enrolled: 186)
- Queen Mary Community School (Enrolled: 414)
- Red Wing School (Enrolled: 283)
- Riverside Community Junior High School (Enrolled: 377)
- Shell Lake School (Enrolled:10) -Scheduled to close permanently in Summer 2010
- Shellbrook Elementary School (Enrolled:174)
- Spruce Home School (Enrolled: 131)
- Star Program (Special development education)(Enrolled: N/A)
- T.D. Michel Public School (Enrolled: 135)
- Vincent Massey Community School (Enrolled: 335)
- W.J. Berezowsky School (Enrolled: 244)
- West Central School (Enrolled: 76)
- Westview School (Enrolled: 239)
- Wild Rose School (Enrolled: 103)

== K-12 ==
- Birch Hills School (Enrolled: 405)
- Canwood Community School (Enrolled: 194)
- Debden School (Enrolled: 209)
- Kinistino (R.J. Humphrey) School (Enrolled: 313)
- Meath Park School (Enrolled: 332)
- St. Louis Community School (Enrolled: 237)
- W.P. Sandin Composite School (Enrolled: 267)

== High schools ==
- Big River Public High School (Enrolled: 93)
- Carlton Comprehensive High School (Enrolled: 1700)
- P.A.C.I High School (Enrolled: 171)
- WESMOR Community High School (Enrolled: 307)
- W.P. Sandin Composite School (Enrolled: 187)
- Wonska Cultural School (Enrolled: 100)

== Alternative Programs (offered by Division #119 alone) ==
The Northgate Program is a program based out of Carlton Comprehensive High School that offers students with reluctance a program that works on a two-month basis. In these two months, students attend two classes and receive the credits for them within the two-month program. Classes are set up in a way that promotes more creativity and a sense of community. Students are situated with the same group of people all throughout the two-month period. There are multiple groups running throughout each period, and they offer normal high school standard credits.

== See also ==
- Prince Albert Catholic School Division
