= Prince Albert, Saskatchewan =

City in Saskatchewan, Canada

Prince Albert: Omanic̣iye Maḳoc̣e (Dakota); kistahpinanihk (Plains Cree)
- City
- City of Prince Albert
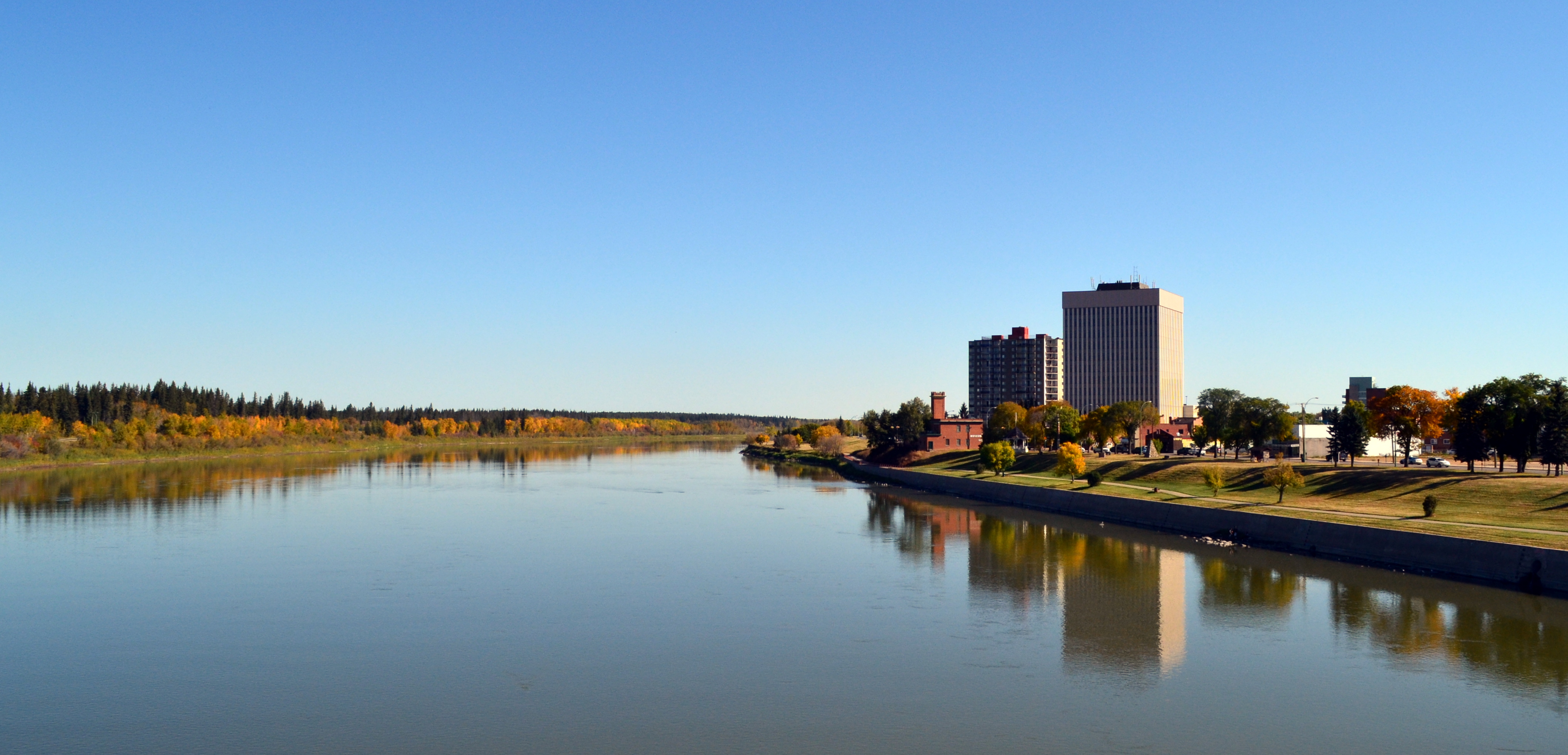

- Flag Coat of arms
- Nicknames: "P.A."
- Motto: Gateway to the North
- Location of Prince Albert Prince Albert (Canada)
- Coordinates: 53°12′N 105°45′W
- Country: Canada
- Province: Saskatchewan
- Census division: 15
- Town: 1885
- Incorporated City: October 8, 1904

Government
  - City Mayor: Bill Powalinsky
  - Governing body: Prince Albert City Council
  - MPs: Randy Hoback (CON)
  - MLAs: Kevin Kasun (SKP); Alana Ross (SKP)

Area (2021)
  - Land: 67.17 km^{2} (25.93 sq mi)
  - Population centre: 21.37 km^{2} (8.25 sq mi)
  - Census agglomeration: 2,537.68 km^{2} (979.80 sq mi)
- Elevation: 440 m (1,440 ft)

Population (2021)
  - Total: 37,756
  - Density: 562.1/km^{2} (1,456/sq mi)
  - Population centre: 36,768
  - Population centre density: 21.37/km^{2} (55.3/sq mi)
  - Census agglomeration: 45,718
  - Census agglomeration density: 2,537.68/km^{2} (6,572.6/sq mi)
- Demonym: Prince Albertan
- Time zone: UTC−06:00 (CST)
- Forward sortation area: S6V - S6X
- Isbister Settlement: 1862
- SK HQ North-West Mounted Police: 1886
- Climate: Dfb
- Website: www.citypa.ca

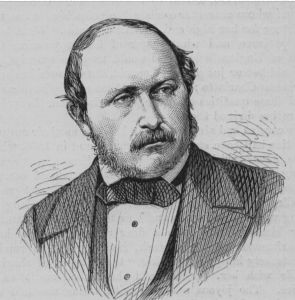
Prince Albert of Saxe-Coburg-Gotha, Prince Consort to Queen Victoria and the namesake of the city chosen by Reverend Nisbet

Prince Albert is the third largest city in Saskatchewan, Canada, after Saskatoon and Regina. It is situated near the geographic centre of the province on the banks of the North Saskatchewan River. Often simply referred to as P. A., the city is also known as the "Gateway to the North" since it is the northernmost major urban centre in the province and serves as somewhat of a hub between Saskatchewan's northern communities and larger communities in the south. Prince Albert National Park is located 51 kilometres (32 mi) north of the city and contains a wealth of lakes, forest, and wildlife. The city itself is located in a transition zone between the aspen parkland and boreal forest biomes. Prince Albert is surrounded by the Rural Municipality of Prince Albert No. 461, of which it is the seat, but is politically separate.

== History ==
The area was named kistahpinanihk by the Cree, which translates to "sitting pretty place", "great meeting place" or "meeting place". The Dakota have known the site of modern-day Prince Albert for centuries as Omanic̣iye Maḳoc̣e, which can be translated as the "Gathering Place" (literally "land where travel is caused").

The first trading post set up in the area was built in 1776 by Peter Pond. James Isbister, an Anglo-Métis employee of the Hudson's Bay Company, settled on the site of the current city in 1862. He farmed there until 1866, and had been joined by a number of families who called the site Isbister's Settlement.

The community received a boost in 1866 when Reverend James Nisbet, a Canada Presbyterian Church minister arrived to establish a mission for the Cree. Nisbet named the mission after Albert, Prince Consort, husband of Queen Victoria, who had died in 1861, from whom the present city derives its name. In 1879, the Presbyterian Church brought out Lucy Margaret Baker to run the local mission school. During the same year, the local Freemasons established the first lodge in what is now the province of Saskatchewan: Kinistino Lodge No. 1, which still exists. "The Mission", the settlement centrally located, and "Porter Town", located to the west, were the two communities that would come together to form what is now Prince Albert. The settlement east of Prince Albert was termed Goschen before finally amalgamated, however East Prince Albert still appears on a 1924 map.

In 1884, Honore Jaxon and James Isbister were involved in the movement which brought Louis Riel back to Canada. Riel returned from the United States following a political exile resulting from the Red River Rebellion that had occurred in 1869–1870. Five hundred people gathered to hear Riel speak one month after his return.

In the North-West Rebellion of the 1885, Prince Albert Volunteers bore the heaviest casualties of the fighting at the Battle of Duck Lake. Surrounding settlers took refuge with the North-West Mounted Police in a hastily improvised stockade at Prince Albert, fearing an attack by Gabriel Dumont, which never came. After the Battle of Batoche, Major General Frederick Middleton marched to Prince Albert to relieve the town. Prince Albert, with a population of about 800 people, was incorporated as a town the same year under its first mayor, Thomas McKay. In 1904, the settlement was incorporated as the City of Prince Albert. Its government is of a council-mayor type.

Prince Albert was the capital of the District of Saskatchewan, a regional administrative division of what then constituted the North-West Territories. The District of Saskatchewan was formed on May 8, 1882, and named Prince Albert as its capital. This ended in 1905 when Saskatchewan became a province and Regina was designated the new provincial capital.

Prince Albert was one of the rival candidates to house either the University of Saskatchewan or the Saskatchewan Federal Penitentiary. The university was built in Saskatoon and the penitentiary was built in Prince Albert in 1911.

The federal constituency of Prince Albert has been represented by three prime ministers of Canada:

- John Diefenbaker, 13th Prime Minister (1957–1963), became the Member of Parliament for Lake Centre in 1940, and when that riding was abolished in 1952, represented Prince Albert from 1953 until his death in 1979.
- William Lyon Mackenzie King, tenth Prime Minister, represented Prince Albert from 1926 to 1945.
- Sir Wilfrid Laurier, seventh Prime Minister, represented Prince Albert in the Saskatchewan provisional district (still part of Northwest Territories) in 1896, before returning to his Quebec East riding later that year.

=== Royal visits ===
Prince Albert has welcomed the following members of Canada's Royal Family:

- The Princess Margaret – 1958 and 1980
- The Duke and Duchess of York (The then Prince Andrew and Sarah) – 1989
- The Earl of Wessex (The Prince Edward) – 2003

== Geography ==
Prince Albert is located on the White Fox Plain of the Saskatchewan River lowlands. These lowlands are located in the physiographic region of the Saskatchewan Plains Region of the Central Lowlands Province. The natural vegetation of the area consists of aspen parkland to the south and southern boreal forest to the north of the North Saskatchewan River. These two ecoregions have differing soil types: the northern forested soils are brunisolic and sandy, whereas south of the river are black chernozemic soils. The North Saskatchewan River runs through the centre of Prince Albert. The main soils of the city of Prince Albert are those of the valley complex consisting mainly of regosolic soils which produce natural vegetation which are not forest nor grassland but a complex of the two. It is here that the treeline of Saskatchewan begins, and to the north of the city begins the forested growth of Jack Pine (Pinus banksiana), as well as other boreal forest growth in the Prince Albert National Park, and Nisbet forest. The forests north of the city, especially those containing Jack Pine are infected with Dwarf Mistletoe and various projects have been undertaken to stop the spread of this parasitic plant. The agricultural soils around Prince Albert have some limitations and about 35% of the land is covered with sloughs or potholes. Creek systems such as the Red Deer Hill Creek and McFarlane Creek drain into the South Saskatchewan River. In the past these creeks have been known to dry up allowing farmers to cut hay, but in recent years these waterways have been overfilling due to large amounts of winter run-off and increase of the water table. The land use is divided into the southern woodland area north of Prince Albert and cropland to the south.

The Quaternary glacial geology precludes the region to have been covered by the large prehistoric glacial lake called Lake Agassiz. The ancient shoreline can be seen along the "Esker Trail" in Narrow Hills Provincial Park which is just north-east of the city. Many different types of fossils have been found in the Prince Albert region. Along the riverbanks of the Shell River can be observed a stratum containing Quaternary bivalve mollusk shells and in 2014 the vertebrae and bone fragments of a bison were found by local college students attending Saskatchewan Polytechnic in the Shell River area. Various areas (especially eroded river banks) have been known to reveal bison skulls and other various types of fossils. Claims have also been made of various types of marine fossils including oysters, clams, corals and other invertebrates are to be found mixed in fossil matrixes just east of the city near the small village of Love The bedrock geology is a part of the phanerozoic basin and belongs to the Lea Park and Milk River Formation.

The bulk of the city's population and commercial areas are located on the south shore of the river, with only a few sparsely populated neighbourhoods, an industrial area, and the airport (along with some parkland) on the north.

=== Climate ===
Prince Albert experiences a humid continental climate (Köppen: Dfb). It is close to being subarctic (Dfc) with May and September mean temperatures being just above 10 °C (50 °F). The coldest month on average is January with an average low of −22.8 °C (−9.0 °F), and July is the hottest month with an average high of 24.2 °C (75.6 °F). The highest temperature ever recorded in Prince Albert was 39.4 °C (102.9 °F) on July 19, 1941. The coldest temperature ever recorded was −56.7 °C (−70.1 °F) on February 1, 1893. Winter lasts five months of the year with January daily mean of −17.2 °C (1.0 °F), causing a great temperature amplitude in comparison to the 17.9 °C (64.2 °F) mean temperature of July. The variability of the climate is further demonstrated by the brief transition zones with April recording both above and below 32 °C (90 °F) and −33 °C (−27 °F), respectively.

The record high daily minimum was 22.3 °C (72.1 °F) recorded July 21, 1989. The record highest dew point was 24.2 °C (75.6 °F) recorded July 16, 2022. The most humid month was July 2012 with an average dew point of 15.3 °C (59.5 °F). The warmest month was July 2007 with an average mean temperature of 21.1 °C (70.0 °F).

Climate data for Prince Albert Airport, 1991–2020 normals, extremes 1884–present (Note: Climate data was recorded in the city of Prince Albert from September 1884 to November 1942 and at Prince Albert Airport from December 1942 to present.)
Month	Jan	Feb	Mar	Apr	May	Jun	Jul	Aug	Sep	Oct	Nov	Dec	Year
Record high humidex	11.7	10.6	19.4	30.8	35.1	41.3	41.8	40.6	36.0	29.9	18.5	8.3	41.8
Record high °C (°F)	12.8 (55.0)	12.8 (55.0)	20.0 (68.0)	32.2 (90.0)	35.6 (96.1)	38.8 (101.8)	39.4 (102.9)	36.7 (98.1)	36.1 (97.0)	30.6 (87.1)	19.4 (66.9)	11.1 (52.0)	39.4 (102.9)
Mean maximum °C (°F)	4.3 (39.7)	4.6 (40.3)	10.4 (50.7)	21.1 (70.0)	28.0 (82.4)	29.8 (85.6)	30.9 (87.6)	31.6 (88.9)	27.5 (81.5)	20.5 (68.9)	8.9 (48.0)	3.1 (37.6)	32.7 (90.9)
Mean daily maximum °C (°F)	−11.6 (11.1)	−7.9 (17.8)	−1.4 (29.5)	9.1 (48.4)	17.3 (63.1)	21.5 (70.7)	24.2 (75.6)	23.4 (74.1)	17.6 (63.7)	8.5 (47.3)	−2.0 (28.4)	−9.2 (15.4)	7.4 (45.3)
Daily mean °C (°F)	−17.2 (1.0)	−14.1 (6.6)	−7.4 (18.7)	2.7 (36.9)	10.1 (50.2)	15.2 (59.4)	17.9 (64.2)	16.7 (62.1)	10.9 (51.6)	3.1 (37.6)	−6.5 (20.3)	−14.4 (6.1)	1.4 (34.5)
Mean daily minimum °C (°F)	−22.8 (−9.0)	−20.3 (−4.5)	−13.4 (7.9)	−3.8 (25.2)	2.7 (36.9)	8.7 (47.7)	11.6 (52.9)	9.8 (49.6)	4.2 (39.6)	−2.4 (27.7)	−10.9 (12.4)	−19.4 (−2.9)	−4.7 (23.5)
Mean minimum °C (°F)	−38.5 (−37.3)	−35.4 (−31.7)	−29.8 (−21.6)	−14.3 (6.3)	−5.6 (21.9)	1.5 (34.7)	5.6 (42.1)	3.0 (37.4)	−3.6 (25.5)	−11.0 (12.2)	−23.8 (−10.8)	−33.3 (−27.9)	−40.0 (−40.0)
Record low °C (°F)	−55.0 (−67.0)	−56.7 (−70.1)	−45.6 (−50.1)	−33.9 (−29.0)	−16.1 (3.0)	−4.4 (24.1)	0.6 (33.1)	−5.6 (21.9)	−15.6 (3.9)	−26.1 (−15.0)	−45.0 (−49.0)	−49.4 (−56.9)	−56.7 (−70.1)
Record low wind chill	−59.7	−57.9	−50.0	−43.1	−18.3	−9.2	0.0	−3.2	−16.0	−28.2	−49.7	−54.1	−59.7
Average precipitation mm (inches)	18.6 (0.73)	11.5 (0.45)	14.5 (0.57)	27.7 (1.09)	43.1 (1.70)	86.4 (3.40)	77.2 (3.04)	50.4 (1.98)	41.9 (1.65)	29.7 (1.17)	16.0 (0.63)	15.5 (0.61)	432.3 (17.02)
Average rainfall mm (inches)	0.3 (0.01)	0.1 (0.00)	1.7 (0.07)	19.2 (0.76)	40.3 (1.59)	86.4 (3.40)	79.0 (3.11)	51.2 (2.02)	41.5 (1.63)	21.6 (0.85)	2.5 (0.10)	0.6 (0.02)	344.3 (13.56)
Average snowfall cm (inches)	23.4 (9.2)	14.4 (5.7)	15.3 (6.0)	10.2 (4.0)	2.1 (0.8)	0.0 (0.0)	0.0 (0.0)	0.0 (0.0)	0.3 (0.1)	9.9 (3.9)	16.1 (6.3)	19.9 (7.8)	111.5 (43.9)
Average precipitation days (≥ 0.2 mm)	10.6	7.6	7.6	8.7	10.0	13.3	13.7	10.0	9.4	9.4	8.4	9.5	118.4
Average rainy days (≥ 0.2 mm)	0.5	0.3	2.0	6.1	9.9	13.3	13.8	10.1	9.2	7.3	1.2	0.6	74.2
Average snowy days (≥ 0.2 cm)	11.7	9.1	7.1	4.3	0.9	0.0	0.0	0.0	0.3	2.8	8.0	11.1	55.3
Average relative humidity (%) (at 15:00 LST)	70.0	65.5	60.4	47.4	40.9	51.0	54.1	50.8	51.0	58.3	71.3	73.8	57.9
Average dew point °C (°F)	−19.9 (−3.8)	−17.9 (−0.2)	−11.5 (11.3)	−4.3 (24.3)	1.3 (34.3)	8.5 (47.3)	12.3 (54.1)	10.9 (51.6)	5.3 (41.5)	−1.6 (29.1)	−9.3 (15.3)	−17.1 (1.2)	−3.6 (25.5)
Mean monthly sunshine hours	93.9	126.5	175.9	225.1	269.2	275.0	297.7	289.7	187.1	136.1	78.0	74.7	2,229
Percentage possible sunshine	37.2	45.7	47.9	53.8	54.8	54.3	58.5	63.3	49.0	41.3	29.9	31.6	47.3
Source 1: Environment and Climate Change Canada (sun 1981–2010)
Source 2: weatherstats.ca (for dewpoint and monthly&yearly average absolute maximum&minimum temperature)

== Demographics ==
Historical populations
Year	Pop.	±%
1901	1,785	—
1911	6,254	+250.4%
1921	7,558	+20.9%
1931	9,905	+31.1%
1941	12,299	+24.2%
1951	17,149	+39.4%
1961	24,168	+40.9%
1971	28,464	+17.8%
1981	31,380	+10.2%
1991	34,181	+8.9%
1996	34,771	+1.7%
2001	34,291	−1.4%
2006	34,138	−0.4%
2011	35,129	+2.9%
2016	35,926	+2.3%
2021	37,756	+5.1%

In the 2021 Canadian census conducted by Statistics Canada, Prince Albert had a population of 37,756 living in 14,308 of its 15,490 total private dwellings, a change of 5.1% from its 2016 population of 35,926. With a land area of 67.17 km^{2} (25.93 sq mi), it had a population density of 562.1/km^{2} (1,455.8/sq mi) in 2021.

Canada census – Prince Albert community profile

	2021	2011
Population	37,756 (+5.1% from 2016)	35,129 (+2.9% from 2006)
Land area	67.17 km^{2} (25.93 sq mi)	65.74 km^{2} (25.38 sq mi)
Population density	562.1/km^{2} (1,456/sq mi)	534.4/km^{2} (1,384/sq mi)
Median age	35.2 (M: 33.2, F: 36.8)	34.7 (M: 32.8, F: 36.4)
Private dwellings	14,305 (total)	14,779 (total)
Median household income

References: 2021 2011

For residents over the age of 25 years, 82.7% have a high school diploma (or equivalent), 55.3% have a post-secondary degree; and 17.3% have no certificate, diploma, or degree.

=== Ethnicity ===
Prince Albert has one of the highest Aboriginal population ratios for any Canadian city, at 44.65%.

Panethnic groups in the City of Prince Albert (2001−2021)
Panethnic group	2021		2016		2011		2006		2001	
Panethnic group	Pop.	%	Pop.	%	Pop.	%	Pop.	%	Pop.	%
Indigenous	16,120	44.65%	14,830	42.44%	13,930	40.65%	12,140	36.3%	10,180	30.45%
European (Note: Statistic includes all persons that did not make up part of a visible minority or an indigenous identity.)	15,765	43.66%	17,280	49.45%	19,210	56.05%	20,420	61.06%	22,640	67.72%
Southeast Asian (Note: Statistic includes total responses of "Filipino" and "Southeast Asian" under visible minority section on census.)	1,750	4.85%	1,250	3.58%	395	1.15%	115	0.34%	140	0.42%
South Asian	1,045	2.89%	660	1.89%	170	0.5%	165	0.49%	100	0.3%
African	805	2.23%	475	1.36%	190	0.55%	165	0.49%	120	0.36%
East Asian (Note: Statistic includes total responses of "Chinese", "Korean", and "Japanese" under visible minority section on census.)	210	0.58%	180	0.52%	235	0.69%	250	0.75%	115	0.34%
Middle Eastern (Note: Statistic includes total responses of "West Asian" and "Arab" under visible minority section on census.)	170	0.47%	120	0.34%	35	0.1%	95	0.28%	15	0.04%
Latin American	155	0.43%	75	0.21%	50	0.15%	85	0.25%	100	0.3%
Other/multiracial (Note: Statistic includes total responses of "Visible minority, n.i.e." and "Multiple visible minorities" under visible minority section on census.)	60	0.17%	90	0.26%	0	0%	10	0.03%	20	0.06%
Total responses	36,105	95.63%	34,945	97.27%	34,270	97.55%	33,445	97.97%	33,430	97.49%
Total population	37,756	100%	35,926	100%	35,129	100%	34,138	100%	34,291	100%
Note: Totals greater than 100% due to multiple origin responses

=== Religion ===
As of the 2021 Census, 58.8% of residents identified as Christian of any denomination, and 36.1% identified as having no religion or having secular beliefs. (Note: Based on 25% sample data)

=== Language ===
English Canadians make up more than 80% of the city's population. More than 20% of the population is foreign-born or second generation immigrants. French Canadians make up less than 2% of Prince Albert's inhabitants.

Mother tongue language (2021)

Language	Population	Pct (%)
English only	29,670	81.8%
French only	645	1.8%
Both English & French	205	0.6%
Other languages	4,610	12.7%

== Economy ==
Prince Albert is situated on the banks of the North Saskatchewan River, with rich agricultural land to the south and the boreal forest to the north. Although Prince Albert is centrally located in Saskatchewan, it is the second most northerly city in the province after Meadow Lake. This physical location has led to the creation of the slogan "Gateway to the North".

After being established as a mission centre, the main impetus for growth was speculation that the Transcontinental Railway would travel north from the Red River Valley along Hind's fertile belt through to Edmonton. When the Canadian Pacific Railway chose a more southerly route, Prince Albert's growth collapsed:

By 1914, Prince Albert had become the terminus of four railway branch lines. However, neither the Hudson Bay and Pacific or the Canadian Northern had started any line to the north. In all, the city had not become the great gateway to north as it had planned.

— City of Prince Albert Website

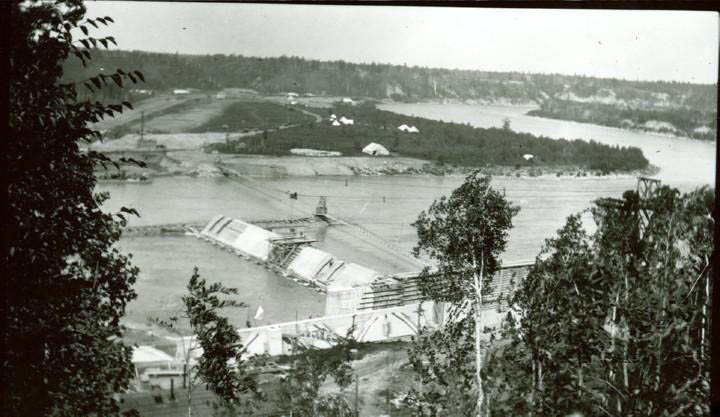
The La Colle Falls hydroelectric power dam under construction in 1916

The La Colle Falls hydroelectric power dam project was an attempt to provide affordable electricity to attract industry By 1927, the project was abandoned as the city was close to bankruptcy. In 1945, Prince Albert National Park was established, and the tourism sector helped to again revive Prince Albert's economy.

The city's location has benefited the community in many ways through the years as an agriculture, forestry, tourism, mining, retail, and service centre for the immediate market and the northern communities. Prince Albert has a total trade area of 140,000 people, including an additional 12,000 that can be included if Flin Flon and The Pas are accounted for. The major contributing factor to this is the role of Prince Albert as a retail and service centre to these northern communities.

There are a number of major developments that are happening around Prince Albert. Diamond exploration is currently occurring east of the city in the Fort à la Corne region and it is expected a mine may go up around 2010–2011.

In addition to diamond prospects, Bio-fuels are also playing a significant role to the area. The Prince Albert region is one of the richest areas in the province for agriculture, and with the current emphasis on bio-fuel technology from the provincial and federal governments, it is expected that this economic sector will grow. Uranium is also expected to play a bigger role in the future development of Prince Albert. There is speculation that, due to the proximity of uranium mining in northern Saskatchewan, the area could be ideal for a value-added type of business.

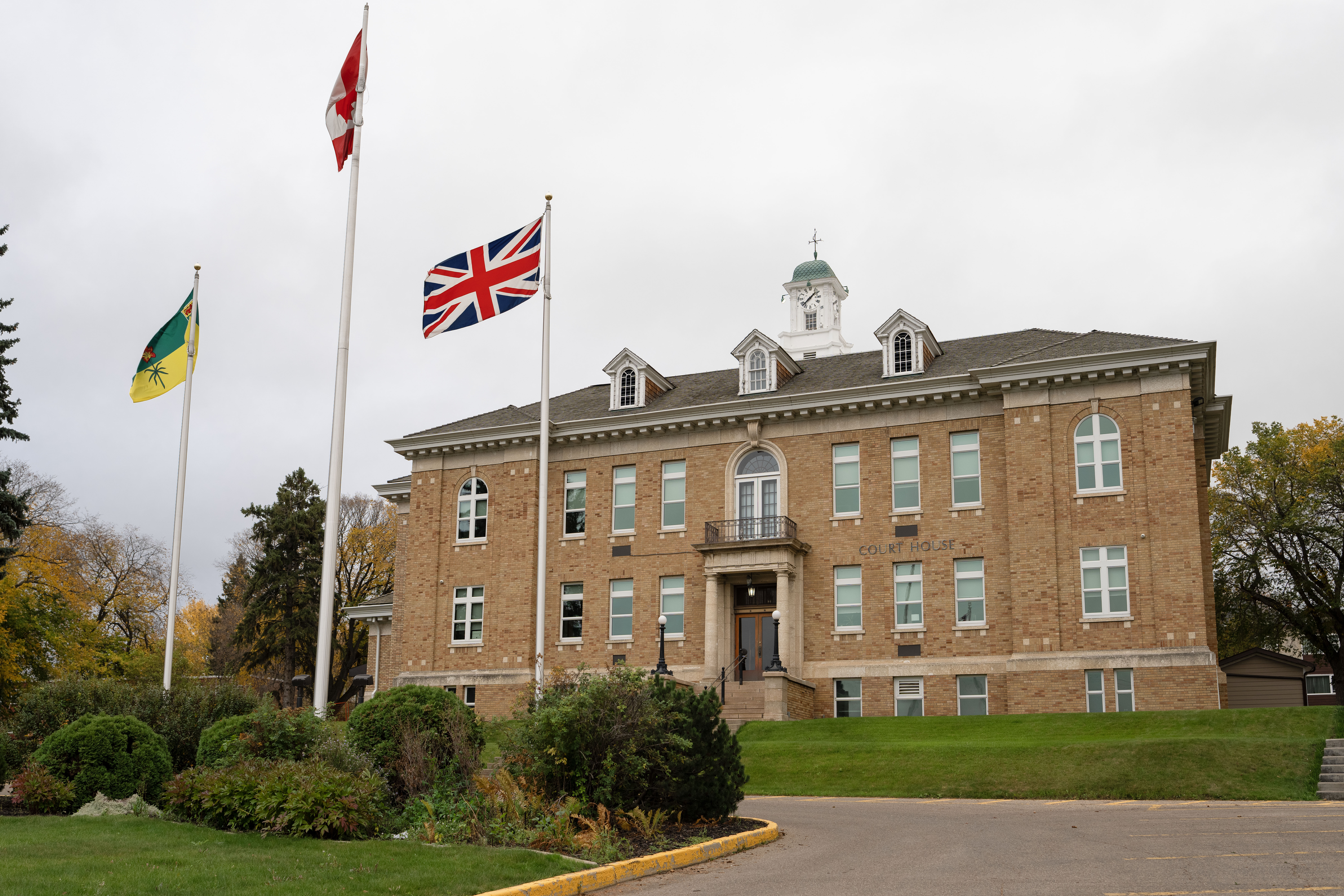
Prince Albert Court House

Prince Albert is still heavily reliant on its government service sector, which accounts for about 11% of the workforce. There are three prisons, the Prince Albert Correctional Centre, Pine Grove Correctional Centre, and the Saskatchewan Federal Penitentiary.

Chief Joseph Custer, Kistapinanihk 231, Northern Lights 220, Muskoday 99 and Wahpeton 94B Indian Reserves are within 20 km (12 mi) of the city.

The forestry industry is also a major contributor to the economy of Prince Albert. Prince Albert currently hosts the Provincial Forestry Centre, a building that hosts significant wood and forestry related types of businesses and associations.

Prince Albert Pulp Company had been the area's largest employer since it opened in 1968. The mill was closed down in 2006 by its then owner, Weyerhaeuser. The mill was subsequently sold. Paper Excellence purchased the long-closed down Prince Albert Pulp Inc. from Domtar in April 2011 with plans to operate a dissolving pulp mill producing 1,000 tonnes per day employing about 250 people. The pulp mill was shut down indefinitely and 42 employees laid off on August 29, 2014.

== Attractions ==
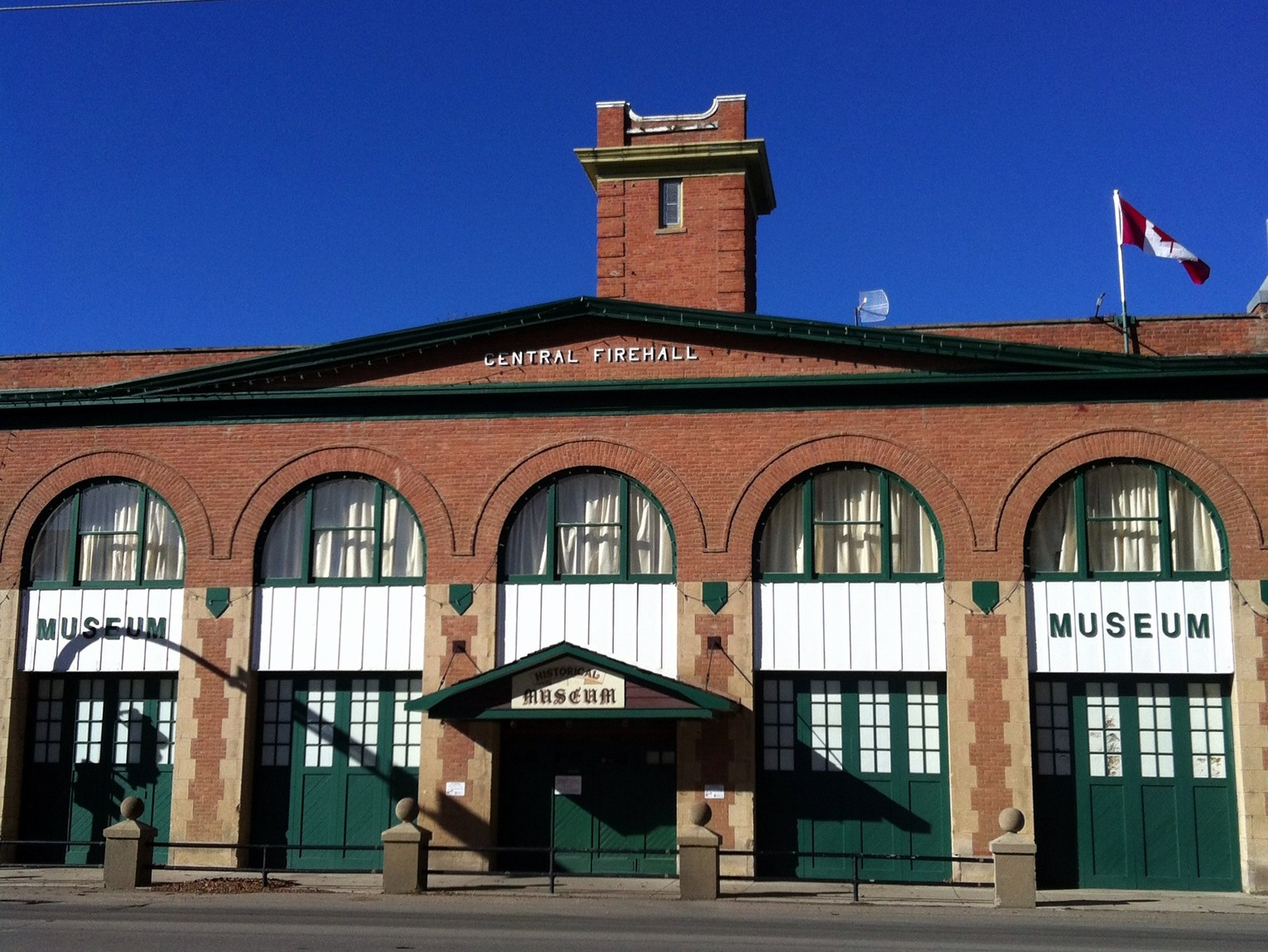
Prince Albert Historical Museum

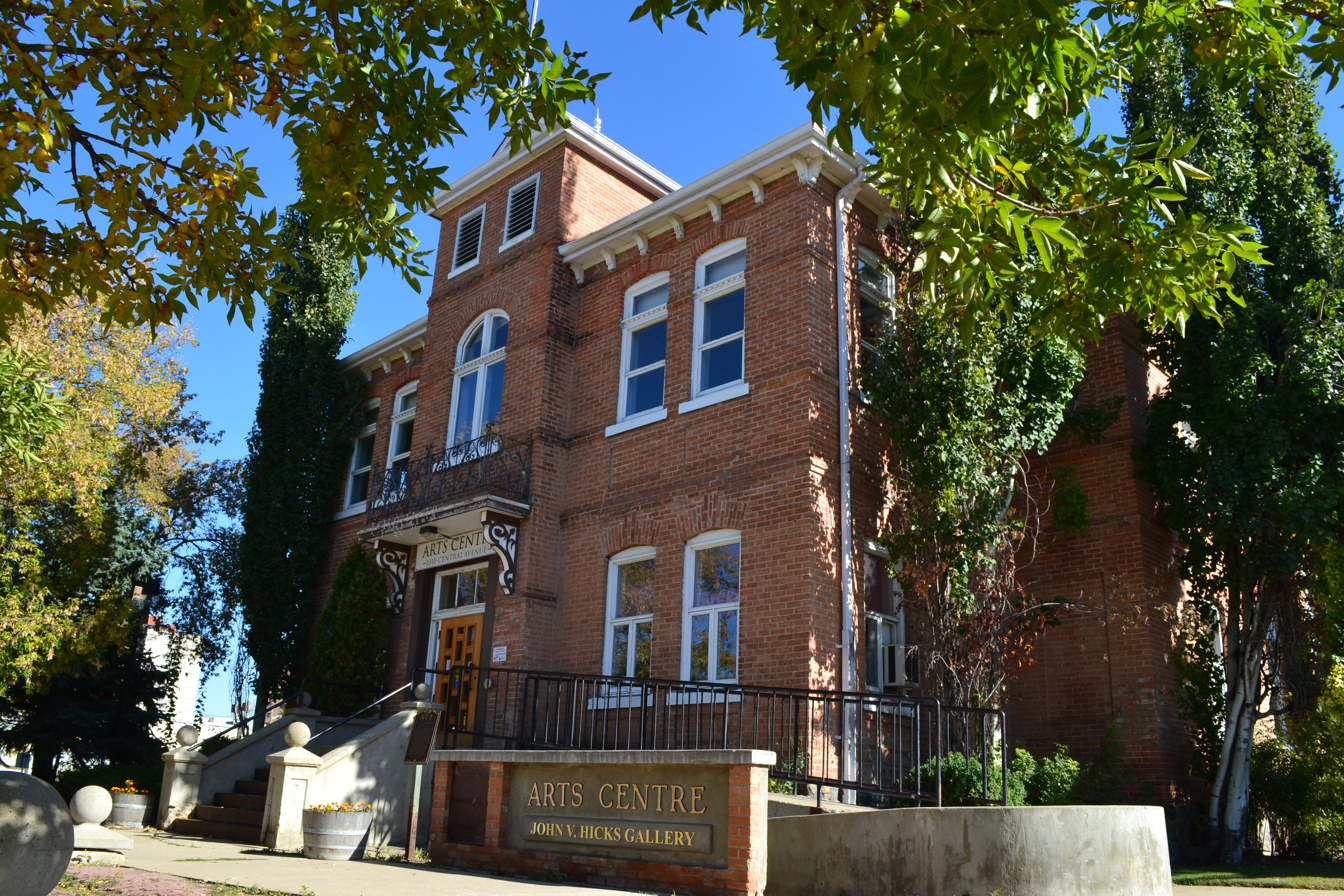
Prince Albert Arts Centre

There are three historical museums in Prince Albert. The combined The Evolution of Education Museum and Rotary Museum of Police and Corrections are located at the tourist information centre just off of Highway #2 South. The second museum, the Historical Society Museum, is located in an old Fire Hall at the north end of Central Avenue on River Street. The John G. Diefenbaker House is a historic site open to the public and is found on 249 19th Street West. The Prince Albert Heritage Museum (c. 1911) is a Municipal Heritage Property on the Canadian Register of Historic Places.

Across from the Historical Society Museum is the site of Diefenbaker's constituency office that is not open to the public. Among the other heritage, historic and protected sites of Prince Albert are the Blockhouse from the 1885 Rebellion & First Presbyterian Church/School, Historic St. Paul's Presbyterian Church, Honeywood (Dr. A. J. Porter) Heritage Nursery, Keyhole Castle, LaColle Falls Hydroelectric Dam, Oldest Downtown Store, Prince Albert Arts Centre and The Cathedral Church of St. Alban the Martyr (Anglican). Sacred Heart Cathedral (Roman Catholic) near the downtown area was built in 1914 in the Romanesque style. It contains paintings by Berthold Imhoff. The Institute for Stained Glass in Canada has documented the stained glass of six buildings in Prince Albert.

Other points of interest include:

- The St. Louis Light, a commonly visited, supposedly paranormal, phenomenon occurring south of the city.
- Fort de la Corne, a short distance east from Prince Albert, is the furthest westward post of the French Empire in North America (see New France).
- The Prince Albert Sanatorium, completed in 1930 and treated tuberculosis patients.
- The Buckland Wildlife Management Unit, located within 4 km (2.5 mi) of the city.
- Kinsmen Ski and Snowboard Centre at Little Red River Park

== Sports and recreation ==
The city is home to the Prince Albert Raiders of the Western Hockey League. The Raiders, who won the Memorial Cup in 1985, play in the 3,571-seat Art Hauser Centre. The city is also home to the Prince Albert Mintos of the Saskatchewan Midget AAA Hockey League. They won the 2006, 2007 and 2014 Telus Cup. They also play in the Art Hauser Centre.

=== Notable Sports Teams ===
Hockey
Club	Type	Level	League	Venue	Established	Championships
Prince Albert Raiders	Ice Hockey	Major Junior	WHL	Art Hauser Centre	1971	2
Prince Albert Timberjaks	Ice Hockey	Junior B	PJHL	Northern Regional Recreation Centre (Buckland, SK)	2023	0
Prince Albert Mintos	Ice Hockey	U18 AAA	SMAAAHL	Art Hauser Centre	1909	2
Prince Albert Raider Northern Bears	Ice Hockey	U18 AAA	SFU18AAAHL	Art Hauser Centre		

Lacrosse
Club	Type	Level	League	Venue	Established	Championships
Prince Albert Predators	Lacrosse	Junior B Tier 2	PGLL	Kinsmen Arena	2003	5

Prince Albert was the host for the following notable sporting events:

- 1993 North American Indigenous Games
- 2018 U-18 Men's Softball World Cup.
- The city will be the host for the 2025 Men's Softball World Cup, with the group stage taking place in July 2024 and finals in July 2025. The competition will be held at Prime Minister's Park.
- 11th Saskatchewan Winter Games, Feb. 16–22, 2014. The Prince Albert community brought together a volunteer workforce and hosted over 1800 amateur athletes from 9 districts in Saskatchewan.

== Infrastructure ==
The first hospital was constructed in 1899, followed by a maternity home built in 1945 which lasted approximately twelve years.

=== Bridges ===
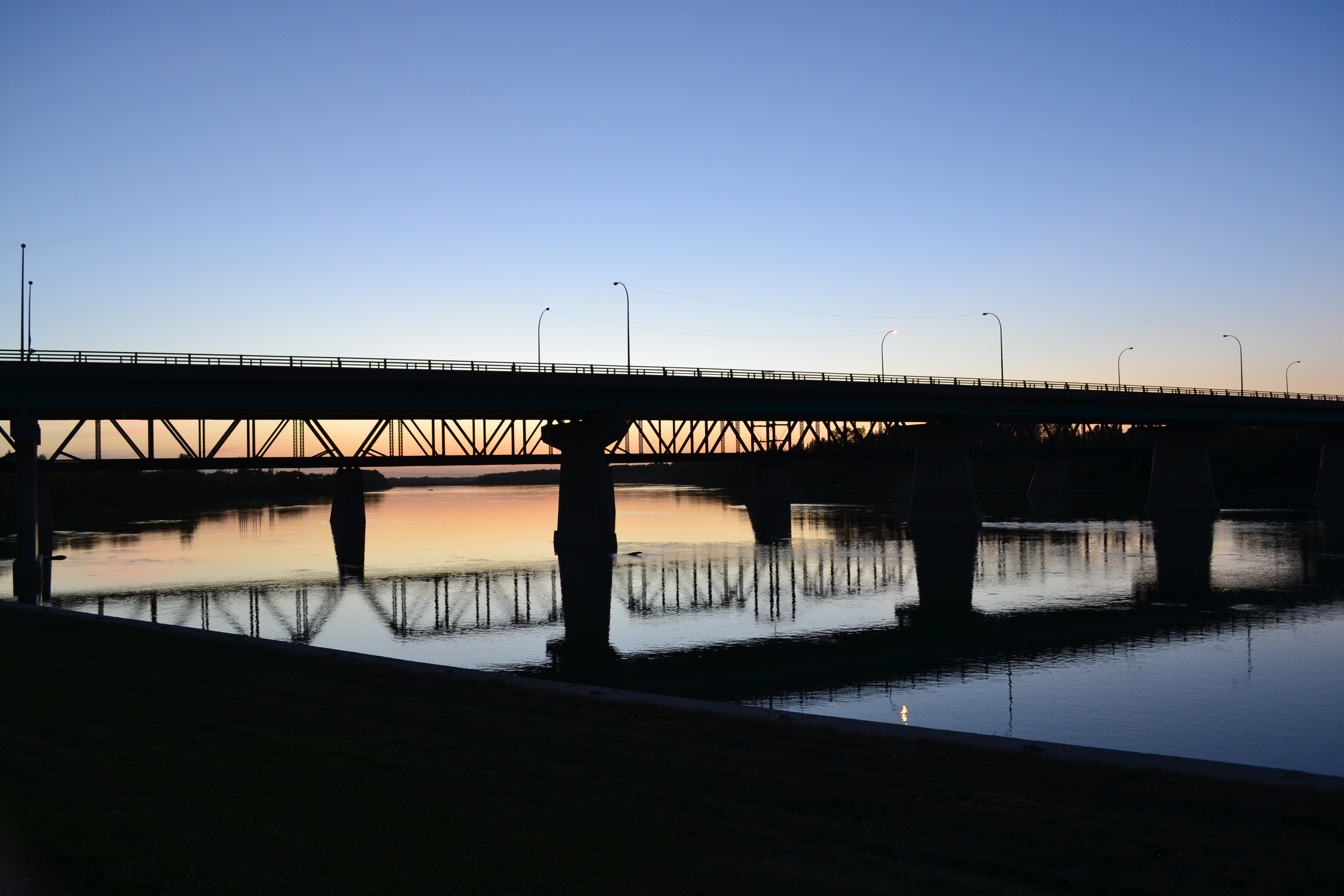
The Diefenbaker Bridge at Prince Albert

At present, only a single road bridge, the Diefenbaker Bridge, connects the north and south shore in Prince Albert; this bridge is also the only river crossing connecting southern and northern Saskatchewan in the immediate vicinity (one needs to drive many kilometres to the east or west to find another).

This has long been a subject of concern in the region, especially in light of a partial closure of the bridge in August 2011 that occurred when cracks were found during an inspection.

=== Historic trails ===
In 1866, Prince Albert was established as a mission post, and a trail to Fort Carlton arose. This trail connected the growing community to the Carlton Trail, the main land transportation route in Western Canada of the 19th century. The trail followed along the current Lily Plain grid road in Saskatchewan to the ferry service at Lilly Plain post office.

The Qu'Appelle (Troy) – Prince Albert Trail was in use from 1883 transporting mail and freight goods from the rail depot at Qu'Appelle across the ferry at St. Louis to Prince Albert. Besides these two trails, Prince Albert was also served by the Montreal Lake–PA, Green Lake–PA, and Fort à la Corne–PA trails.

=== Railways ===
==== Canadian Northern and Grand Trunk Pacific ====
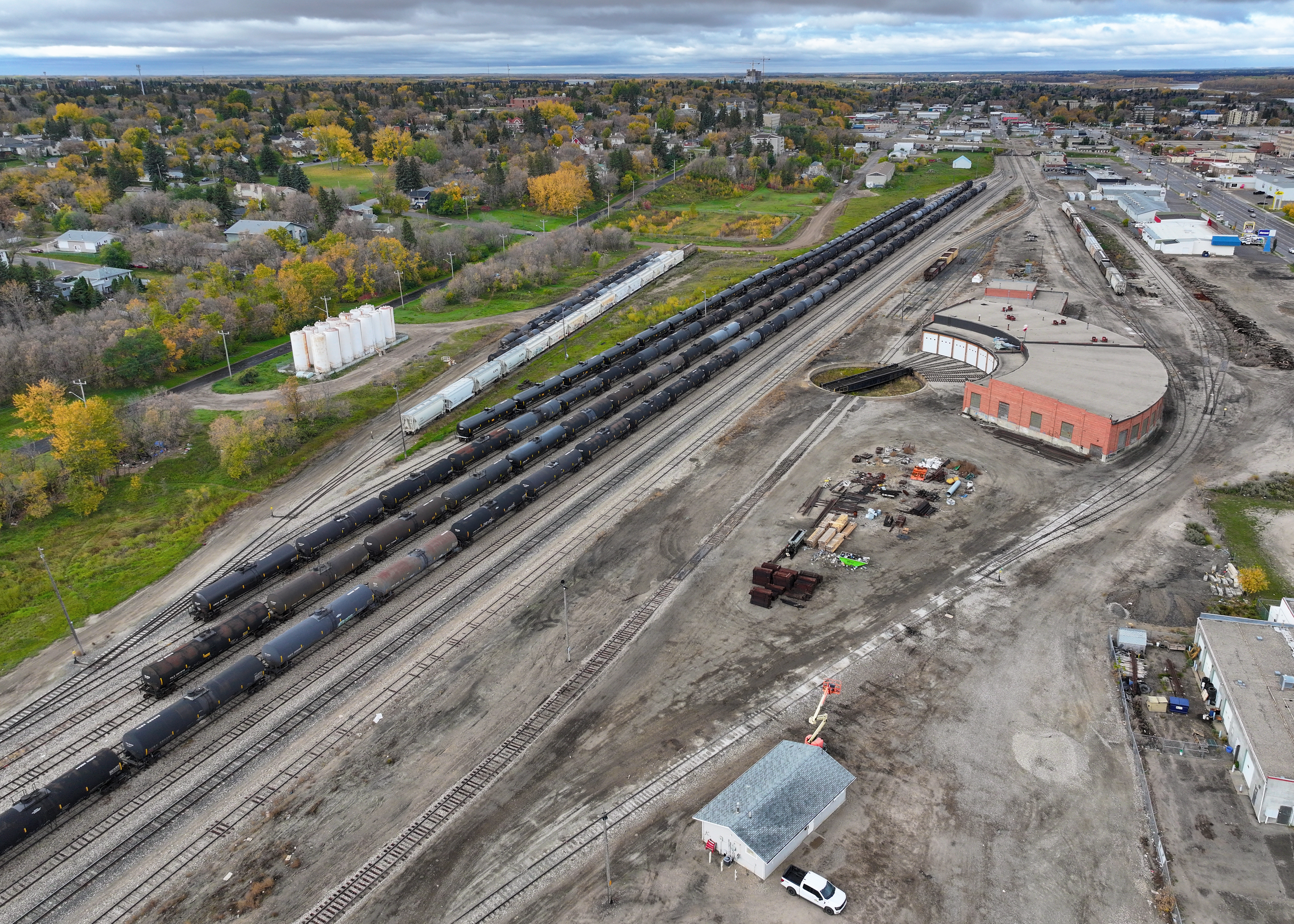
Former CN Rail Yard, now used by Carlton Trail Railway

Qu'Appelle, Long Lake and Saskatchewan Railroad and Steamboat Company (QLSRSC) arrived in Prince Albert in October 1890 as a means to link the three major cities of Saskatchewan through one railroad. For the next few years the line was seldom used, and in order to raise capital, QLSRSC leased the line out to the Canadian Pacific Railway. Canadian Pacific soon realized the economic uncertainty of the line, and the lease was cancelled after only a few years of service.

By 1906, less than twenty years after the line was completed, it was sold to the Canadian Northern Railway (CNoR). Canadian Northern also crossed the North Saskatchewan River, heading west towards Shellbrook. Prince Albert was slated to become a northern hub for rail service into the north, however with little economic activity in the area, no branch lines were ever extended into the north except for the Paddockwood spur, which was subsequently abandoned during the 1990s as a grain-dependent branch line.

Grand Trunk Pacific (GTP) also serviced Prince Albert through a branch line that headed north from Young, through St. Louis and North into Prince Albert. Later both the CNoR and GTP were nationalized, eventually becoming the Canadian National Railway (CN).

==== Canadian National and Canadian Pacific ====
For years the Canadian Pacific Railway and Canadian National Railway dominated the city of Prince Albert, operating on both sides of 15th Street. The Canadian Pacific Railway branched off at Lanigan moving north up to Hagen, then under trackage rights with CN, and curved towards the northeast end of Prince Albert. This was CPR's principal northern site, with many of the branch lines feeding back to Prince Albert. These branch lines almost entirely served lumber mills and grain elevators as principal commodities.

In 1991 CPR decided to shut down rail line operations in Prince Albert and the surrounding area. CPR sold the Meadow Lake line to CN, and abandoned the Meath Park branch up to Choiceland. Many small CN branch lines extended past Prince Albert hauling primarily grain, but proved ineffective due to larger and more accessible grain elevators. As a result, many were abandoned through the 1990s. Lines that have been abandoned include the Paddockwood Spur (CN), CPR to Meath Park, CPR to Lanigan, CN to Shellbrook, and CN to St. Louis. As grain storage and sorting technology improved over the years, a state of the art Inland elevator was built, located north of Prince Albert. This facility was owned by Saskatchewan Wheat Pool, later succeeded by Viterra. The smaller elevator located in the CN yards—owned by United Grain Growers, later acquired by Agricore United which was also succeeded by Viterra—operated in Prince Albert until Viterra announced its cease of operations on April 1, 2008. Today, only the Inland terminal owned by Viterra, located in White Star, continues to operate.

In December 1997, CN announced the branch line was up for sale due to lack of productivity. The engines primarily used by CN at the time were GMD1s for short haul and yard shunting, and EMD SD40-2W/EMD SD40-2s for long-haul trips. CP utilized switchers due in part to the light rail on many of their branch lines. These switchers were manufactured by Montreal Locomotive Works (Bombardier) and were designated as RS-23.

==== Carlton Trail Railway ====
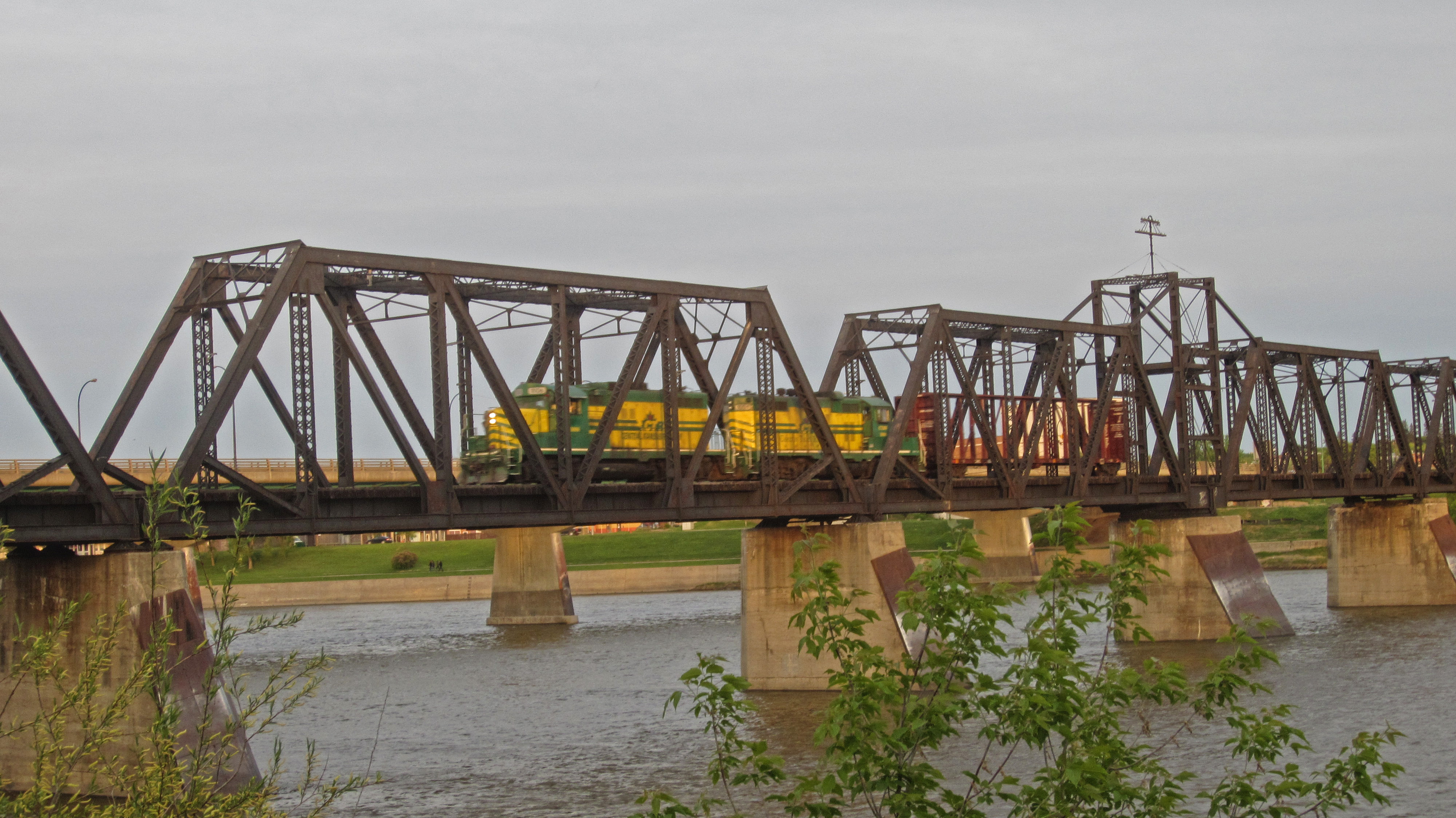
Carlton Trail Railway locomotive crossing the North Saskatchewan at Prince Albert

OmniTRAX, an American shortline railway company, bought the former CN line and named it Carlton Trail Railway (CTRW or CTR). Currently, Carlton Trail Railway resides in the old CN yard, storing tank cars for CN, transporting grain, and refurbishing diesel engines for other OmniTRAX lines. Carlton Trail has recently discussed abandoning several parts of the shortline due to increasing costs and poor track condition. The Railroad bridge in Prince Albert had the ability to turn in on itself to allow ferry ships to pass through. In 2001 CTRW announced the abandonment of the Birch Hills branch line, but the city of Prince Albert intervened, citing the possibility of an ethanol plant. In 2008 Carlton Trail announced the Meadow Lake line would be abandoned by April 1, 2009. Carlton Trail primarily operates EMD GP10s for switching and long-haul transport.

=== Highways ===
Prince Albert is located on SK 2, SK 3, SK 11, SK 55, and SK 302. Prince Albert demarks the change of name for SK 2. The stretch of Highway 2 from Moose Jaw to Prince Albert was designated in 2005 as Veterans Memorial Highway. The renaming coincided with Veterans Week 2005. 283.7 km (176.3 mi) of Saskatchewan Highway 2 contribute to the CanAm Highway between Prince Albert and La Ronge. The CanAm highway south of Prince Albert is designated on SK 3 between Melfort and Prince Albert. SK 11 connects Saskatchewan's three largest cities: Regina, Saskatoon, and Prince Albert. On June 20, 2001, the entire length of SK 11 was re-named the Louis Riel Trail at a ceremony which took place at the Duck Lake Regional Interpretive Centre. The Louis Riel Trail connects major sites of the 1885 North-West Rebellion.

=== Transit ===
Prince Albert Transit is the local city bus service. Prince Albert Transit currently provides service only to the south shore portion of the city.

=== Air transport ===
Glass Field Airport has regular flights to Saskatoon and Regina and serves as an access point to communities and mining operations north of Prince Albert. Many residents of Prince Albert commute to Saskatoon for flights to further destinations.

== Education ==
Anglican Bishop John McLean opened Emmanuel College on November 1, 1879, the first university of the District of Saskatchewan. A federal act later incorporated Emmanuel College into the University of Saskatchewan. Emmanuel College moved to Saskatoon in 1907 to become a part of the provincial University of Saskatchewan, following the inception of Saskatchewan as a province in 1905.

The Saskatchewan Rivers School Division operates 33 schools and the Prince Albert Catholic School Division operates nine schools. The city has five high schools. St. Mary High School, and Rivier Academy (private, co-ed) are part of the Prince Albert Catholic School Division, while Carlton Comprehensive High School (largest high school in Saskatchewan), Wesmor (Acronym of the rural elementary schools Wildrose, East Central, Spruce Home, Meath Park, Osborne, and Redwing), and P.A.C.I (Prince Albert Collegiate Institute) are in the Saskatchewan Rivers School Division. École Valois offers preschool to grade 12 and is the only Francophone school in Prince Albert.

Post-secondary schools found in Prince Albert include the Woodland campus of Saskatchewan Polytechnic (formerly Saskatchewan Institute of Applied Science and Technology) and extension campuses for both the University of Regina and the University of Saskatchewan. Prince Albert is home to branches of the First Nations University of Canada (Northern Campus), Gabriel Dumont Institute, Saskatchewan Indian Institute of Technologies (SIIT), and Saskatchewan Urban Native Teacher Education Program (SUNTEP).

== See also ==
- List of communities in Saskatchewan
- List of cities in Saskatchewan

== Sources ==
- Abrams, Gary W. D. (1966). Prince Albert: The First Century. Modern Press, Saskatoon.
