= Saskatchewan Highway 349 =

Provincial highway in Saskatchewan, Canada

Highway 349

Route information
- Maintained by Ministry of Highways and Infrastructure
- Length: 69.1 km (42.9 mi)

Major junctions
- West end: CanAm Highway / Highway 6 / Highway 777 at Naicam
- Highway 35 at Archerwill
- East end: Highway 38 near Nobleville

Location
- Country: Canada
- Province: Saskatchewan
- Rural municipalities: Pleasantdale, Barrier Valley, Kelvington

Highway system
- Provincial highways in Saskatchewan
← Highway 343	→ Highway 350

Highway 349 is a provincial highway in the Canadian province of Saskatchewan. It runs from Highway 6 (CanAm Highway) / Highway 777 in Naicam to Highway 38. It is about 69 kilometres (43 mi) long.

Highway 349 passes through the communities of Dahlton, Archerwill, and Nobleville. It intersects Highway 679 and is concurrent with Highway 35 for 14 kilometres (8.7 mi).

== Route description ==
Hwy 349 begins in the Rural Municipality of Pleasantdale No. 398 at the intersection between the CanAm Highway (Hwy 6) and Hwy 777 in the town of Naicam, heading eastward through neighbourhoods on the north side of town along 3rd Street N. After crossing a former railway line, it leaves Naicam as a paved two-lane highway and heads through rural areas for several kilometres, traversing a switchback and travelling past several small lakes and Lake Charron Regional Park to an intersection with Hwy 640 (Range Road 2160) just north of St. Front, where it enters the Rural Municipality of Barrier Valley No. 397. The highway now passes through the hamlet of Dahlton before becoming concurrent (overlapped) with southbound Hwy 35 for approximately 14 kilometres (8.7 mi), where the pair travel on the south side of the Ponass Lakes. Entering the town of Archerwill, the highway makes an abrupt sharp left to travel through the centre of downtown before Hwy 349 splits off and heads east across Canadian Pacific Railway's Tisdale Subdivision to have an intersection with Hwy 652 (Algrove Road). After having an intersection with an access road to Barrier Lake (Range Road 2131, also provides access to Barrier Lake View Resort and Barrier Ford), Hwy 349 enters the Rural Municipality of Kelvington No. 366, crossing the Red Deer River immediately north of Nut Lake before the pavement transitions to gravel. Continuing east through a mix of farmland and wooded areas, it has an intersection with Range Road 2123 (provides access to the Yellow Quill First Nation) and passes through the hamlet of Nobleville, where it junctions with Hwy 679. A few kilometres later, Hwy 349 comes to an end the junction with Hwy 38 just south of Greenwater Lake Provincial Park.

== Major intersections ==
From west to east:

Rural municipality	Location	km	mi	Destinations	Notes
Pleasantdale No. 398	Naicam	0.0	0.0	Highway 6 / CanAm Highway – Spalding, Pleasantdale Highway 777 west (Township Road 401) – Lake Lenore	Western terminus; eastern terminus of Hwy 777; road continues as westbound Hwy 777
Pleasantdale No. 398		14.2	8.8	Range Road 2170 – Lake Charron Regional Park	
Pleasantdale No. 398 / Barrier Valley No. 397 boundary		24.2	15.0	Highway 640 south (Range Road 2160) – St. Front	Northern terminus of Hwy 640
Barrier Valley No. 397		32.5	20.2	Highway 35 north – Tisdale	Begin/end concurrency with Hwy 35
Barrier Valley No. 397	Archerwill	46.0	28.6	Highway 35 south – Wadena	Begin/end concurrency with Hwy 35
Barrier Valley No. 397	Archerwill	46.3	28.8	Highway 652 north (Algrove Road) – Barrier Lake	Southern terminus of Hwy 652
Barrier Valley No. 397		52.8	32.8	Range Road 2131 – Barrier Lake View Resort, Barrier Ford	
Kelvington No. 366		57.0	35.4	Bridge over the Red Deer River	
Kelvington No. 366		57.8	35.9	Western end of unpaved section	
Kelvington No. 366		59.4	36.9	Yellow Quill First Nation Road (Range Road 2123) – Yellow Quill First Nation	
Kelvington No. 366	Nobleville	62.6	38.9	Highway 679 north – Marean Lake	Southern terminus of Hwy 679
Kelvington No. 366		69.1	42.9	Highway 38 – Kelvington, Chelan	Eastern terminus; eastern end of unpaved section
1.000 mi = 1.609 km; 1.000 km = 0.621 mi: Concurrency terminus

== See also ==
- Transportation in Saskatchewan
- Roads in Saskatchewan
