= Barrier River (Saskatchewan) =

River in Saskatchewan, Canada

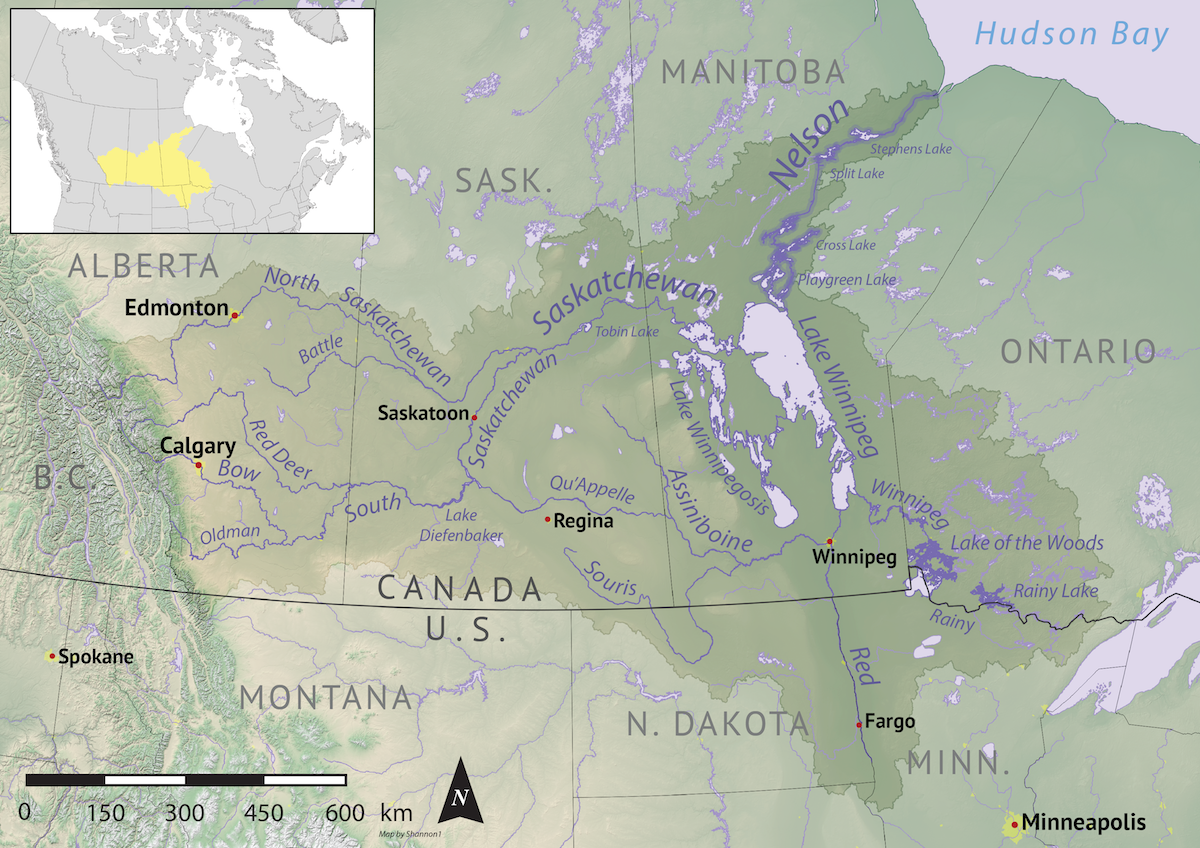
- Nelson River drainage basin

- Location of the river's mouth in Saskatchewan Barrier River (Saskatchewan) (Canada)

Location
- Country: Canada
- Province: Saskatchewan

Physical characteristics
- Source
  - location: RM of Pleasantdale No. 398
  - coordinates: 52.4801°N 104.4733°W
- Mouth: Red Deer River
  - location: RM of Bjorkdale No. 426
  - coordinates: 52.6049°N 103.6579°W

Basin features
- River system: Nelson River
- Tributaries
  - right: Slough Creek
- Waterbodies: Wading Eagle Lake; Kwatapiu Lake; Kipabiskau Lake; Barrier Lake

Barrier River is a river in the Canadian province of Saskatchewan. Set in the aspen parkland ecozone, much of the river flows eastward through the Barrier River Valley that was carved by glacial meltwaters during the last ice age. It is a tributary of the Red Deer River in the Nelson River drainage basin. There are several lakes, communities, and recreational opportunities along Barrier River's course.

== Description ==
Barrier River begins from a slough north of Naicam in the Rural Municipality of Pleasantdale No. 398, just west of Highway 6. It flows north following Highway 6 past the communities of Lac Vert and Pleasantdale. It then curves to the east entering the Barrier River Valley where it empties into Wading Eagle Lake. Wading Eagle Lake is a small, narrow lake sitting on the bottom of the valley floor. Exiting out of the eastern end of Wading Eagle Lake, the river flows about 2 kilometres (1.2 mi) to the south-east and into the western end of Kwatapiu Lake. Like Wading Eagle Lake, Kwatapiu Lake is narrow and rests on the bottom of the valley. At the eastern end of Kwatapiu Lake, Barrier River flows out and through the Kinistin 91 Indian reserve. Flowing east then south through the reserve, the river is crossed by Highway 773 and empties in to Kipabiskau Lake at the southern end of the reserve. Kipabiskau Lake is a much larger lake than either Wading Eagle or Kwatapiu. Along Kipabiskau Lake's shores, there is the Stoney Lake Bible Camp, Kipabiskau Regional Park, and the community of Kipabiskau.

Exiting out of the east end of Kipabiskau Lake, Barrier River travels through the Rural Municipality of Barrier Valley No. 397 and continues through the valley where it is crossed by Highway 35, Range Road 2142, and a Canadian Pacific Railway (CPR) bridge. The community of McKague is near the north bank of the river at the range road and railway crossing. From the CPR crossing, the river bends south and flows into Barrier Lake. Barrier Lake is a long and narrow lake that is crossed by Highway 652 and has resort communities along is shores. At the lake's eastern end is the small community of Barrier Ford, which was named after a ford across Barrier River. From Barrier Ford, the Barrier River flows north-east out of the valley and meets the Red Deer River near Pré-Ste-Marié in the Rural Municipality of Bjorkdale No. 426.

== See also ==
- List of rivers of Saskatchewan
- Hudson Bay drainage basin
