= Marean Lake =

Lake in Saskatchewan, Canada

- Location in Saskatchewan Marean Lake (Canada)
- Location: RM of Bjorkdale No. 426, Saskatchewan
- Coordinates: 52°30′58″N 103°34′27″W
- Part of: Nelson River drainage basin
- River sources: Porcupine Hills
- Catchment area: Hudson Bay drainage basin
- Basin countries: Canada
- Surface area: 661.3 ha (1,634 acres)
- Surface elevation: 530 m (1,740 ft)

Marean Lake is a spring fed lake in the Canadian province of Saskatchewan. The lake is located at the western end of Greenwater Lake Provincial Park in the Porcupine Provincial Forest on the Porcupine Hills. The RM of Bjorkdale No. 426 surrounds the lake and it is accessed off Highway 679. It is about 40 kilometres (25 mi) north of the town of Kelvington.

== Description ==
Several small creeks and springs flow into the lake and a short creek flows out from the eastern end and into neighbouring Greenwater Lake. Greenwater Lake's outflow is Greenwater Creek, which exits the lake at the north-east corner and flows in a north-easterly direction, crossing Highway 38 and Highway 23 near Chelan. About 4.8 kilometres (3.0 mi) north of Chelan, the Greenwater Creek meets up with the Red Deer River. The Red Deer River is a significant river in east central Saskatchewan and west central Manitoba as it is a major tributary of Lake Winnipegosis

The closest town, Porcupine Plain, is about 37 kilometres (23 mi) away from the lake's main public access.

== Parks and recreation ==
Marean Lake is located at the western end of Greenwater Provincial Park. All but a small portion of the western shore is within the park's boundary, which is where Marean Lake Resort is located.

While most of the provincial park's amenities are on Greenwater Lake, there is park access to the lake for fishing, snowmobiling, cross-country skiing, ice skating, and hiking. The Marean Lake Birding Trail is an interpretive trail along the lake that has a 5.5-metre high lookout tower, interpretive signs, and is excellent for bird watching. Over 200 species of birds can be found around the lake, including Trumpeter swans, bald eagles, common yellowthroats, yellow-bellied sapsuckers, osprey, and the red-breasted merganser.

The parcel of land that Marine Lake Resort sits on was purchased in 1952 by Lawrence and Rose McCrea. At that time, there was only a single cabin on the property, which was occupied by the land's caretaker. During the 1960s, the McCreas built several cabins that attracted permanent residents. Over the years, further improvements, such as better road access and campgrounds were developed. The resort now features beach access, public showers, a boat launch, restaurant, convenience store, camping with 75 full-service sites, and cabin rentals. The resort is still owned by the McCrea family.

The 18-hole Green Hills Golf Resort is located just south of the lake.

Marean Lake is part of the Greenwater Lake Provincial Park (SK 071) Important Bird Area (IBA) of Canada.

== Fishing ==
Fish commonly found in Marean Lake include brown trout, northern pike, yellow perch, and walleye. Ice fishing is popular in the winter. The lake was stocked with 500,000 walleye fry in 2023.

== See also ==
- List of lakes of Saskatchewan
