= Kelvington =

Kelvington can refer to:

- Kelvington, Saskatchewan
- Rural Municipality of Kelvington No. 366, Saskatchewan
- Kelvington (electoral district), a former provincial electoral district in Saskatchewan
