= Saskatchewan Highway 38 =

Provincial highway in Saskatchewan, Canada

Highway 38
- Highway 38 highlighted in red

Route information
- Maintained by Ministry of Highways and Infrastructure
- Length: 89.0 km (55.3 mi)

Major junctions
- South end: Highway 5 at Kuroki
- Highway 49 near Kelvington
- North end: Highway 23 near Chelan

Location
- Country: Canada
- Province: Saskatchewan
- Rural municipalities: Sasman, Kelvington, Bjorkdale
- Towns: Kelvington

Highway system
- Provincial highways in Saskatchewan
← Highway 37	→ Highway 39

Highway 38 is a provincial highway in the south-east portion of the Canadian province of Saskatchewan. It runs north from Kuroki to Chelan providing access to Greenwater Lake Provincial Park and Kelvington. Highway 38 is a primary highway that is paved in its entirety and maintained by the provincial government. It is approximately 89 kilometres (55 mi) long.

== Route description ==
Highway 38 begins at Highway 5 at the community of Kuroki, just north of Fishing Lake. From there, the highway heads north where it intersects with Highway 49 and then passes through the town of Kelvington. It continues northward from Kelvington towards Little Nut Lake, Round Lake, and Greenwater Lake. Access to Round Lake and its amenities is from a gravel road east off the highway. At Greenwater Lake, Highway 38 travels through, and provides access to, Greenwater Lake Provincial Park. It continues north from the park and meets Highway 23 at Chelan.

== History ==
Past road upgrades include:

- In 1999, 12.6 km (7.8 mi) was repaved from Chelan south to Greenwater Lake Provincial Park
- In 2021, 23 km (14 mi) of Highway 38 north of the intersection with Highway 49 was repaved

== Major intersections ==
From south to north:

Rural municipality	Location	km	mi	Destinations	Notes
Sasman No. 336	Kuroki	0.0	0.0	Highway 5 to Highway 310 – Canora, Humboldt, Saskatoon	Southern terminus
Sasman No. 336		41.2	25.6	Highway 755 – Wadena, Preeceville	
↑ / ↓	Kelvington	31.3	19.4	Highway 49 – Highway 35, Preeceville	
Kelvington No. 366		37.9	23.5	Highway 760 west – Fosston	
Kelvington No. 366		47.8	29.7	Highway 756 west – Rose Valley	
Kelvington No. 366		65.6	40.8	Highway 349 west – Nobleville, Naicam	
↑ / ↓		67.9– 85.8	42.2– 53.3	Passes through Greenwater Lake Provincial Park	
Bjorkdale No. 426	Chelan	88.9	55.2	Highway 773 west – Pré-Ste-Marié	
Bjorkdale No. 426	Chelan	89.0	55.3	Highway 23 – Crooked River, Carrot River, Porcupine Plain	Northern terminus
1.000 mi = 1.609 km; 1.000 km = 0.621 mi

== See also ==
- Transportation in Saskatchewan
- Roads in Saskatchewan
