= Greenwater Lake =

Lake in Saskatchewan, Canada

- Location in Saskatchewan Greenwater Lake (Canada)
- Location: Greenwater Lake Provincial Park, Saskatchewan
- Coordinates: 52°31′0″N 103°30′2″W
- Part of: Nelson River drainage basin
- Primary outflows: Greenwater Creek
- Basin countries: Canada
- Surface area: 1,097.7 ha (2,712 acres)
- Max. depth: 9.2 m (30 ft)
- Shore length^{1}: 26.4 km (16.4 mi)
- Surface elevation: 530 m (1,740 ft)
- Settlements: None
- ^{1} Shore length is not a well-defined measure.

Greenwater Lake is a lake in the Canadian province of Saskatchewan. The lake is at the heart of Greenwater Lake Provincial Park in the Porcupine Provincial Forest on the Porcupine Hills. The RM of Bjorkdale No. 426 surrounds the lake and Highway 38 provides access to it. The lake is so named not because of the colour of the water but rather the colour of the trees reflecting off the water.

== Description ==
Several small creeks flow into the lake, including a short creek from neighbouring Marean Lake. The outflow for the lake is Greenwater Creek, which exits the lake at the north-east corner and flows in a north-easterly direction, crossing Highways 38 and 23 near Chelan. About 3 miles north of Chelan, the Greenwater Creek meets up with the Red Deer River. The Red Deer River is a major river in east central Saskatchewan and west central Manitoba as it is a major tributary of Lake Winnipegosis.

Other than park amenities, there are no communities on the lake. Porcupine Plain, the closest town, is about 28 kilometres (17 mi) away from the lake's main public access.

== Parks and recreation ==
The entirety of the lake is within the boundaries of Greenwater Lake Provincial Park. As such, there are a lot of activities and amenities in and around the lake, including Greenwater Lake Marina, Green Hills Golf Resort beaches, two boat launches, restaurants, camping, and fishing. During the winter months, ice skating and snowmobiling are popular on the lake.

Greenwater Lake is part of the Greenwater Lake Provincial Park (SK 071) Important Bird Area (IBA) of Canada.

== Fish species ==
Fish commonly found in Greenwater Lake include northern pike, walleye, and yellow perch. Ice fishing is popular in the winter.

== See also ==
- List of lakes of Saskatchewan
- Tourism in Saskatchewan
