= Herbert Pierce =

Canadian politician

Herbert Chandler Pierce (October 6, 1869 – May 7, 1940) was a farmer, real estate agent and political figure in Saskatchewan. He represented Wadena in the Legislative Assembly of Saskatchewan from 1908 to 1916 as a Liberal.

He was born in Tolon Creek, Dane County, Wisconsin, the son of William Smith Pierce, and was educated in Hutchinson, Minnesota and Portage la Prairie, Manitoba. In 1890, he married Martha Fernival Huffman. Pierce lost both of his legs in an accident in Manitoba in 1892, and he was then involved in exhibits on artificial limbs and would demonstrate skating using prosthetic legs. Pierce lived at Wadena, Saskatchewan in Dahlton district. In 1916, Pierce was convicted of bribery for accepting money to oppose the "Banish-the-Bar" bill in the legislature in 1913.

Around 1925, he authored a monetary reform booklet, Our Money System and What It is Doing to Us..., in which he indicated he was working on a larger work, a book that apparently he never completed. His booklet is reproduced in full in Peel's Prairie Provinces website.

Pierce died in 1940 in Archerwill, Saskatchewan.
