= Charron Lake =

Charron Lake may refer to any of the following:

- Charron Lake (Normandin River), a lake in Quebec, Canada
- Charron Lake (Saskatchewan), a lake in Saskatchewan, Canada
