= Kevington =

Kevington may refer to:

- Kevington, London, a hamlet in England
- Kevington, Victoria, a town in Australia

== See also ==
- Kelvington (disambiguation)
