= Archerwill =

Village in Saskatchewan, Canada

- Village
- Village of Archerwill
- Motto: "Where You're A Stranger Only Once"
- Location of Archerwill in Saskatchewan Archerwill (Canada)
- Coordinates: 52°26′23″N 103°51′41″W
- Country: Canada
- Province: Saskatchewan
- Census division: 14
- Rural municipality (RM): Barrier Valley No. 397
- Founded: 1924
- Post office founded: March 16, 1925
- Incorporated (village): January 1, 1947

Government
  - Mayor: Curtis Lozinski (2018)
  - Governing body: Archerwill Village Council
  - MP, Yorkton—Melville: Cathay Wagantall (2025)
  - MLA, Kelvington-Wadena: Chris Beaudry (2024)

Area
  - Land: 0.82 km^{2} (0.32 sq mi)

Population (2021)
  - Total: 153
  - Density: 186.6/km^{2} (483/sq mi)
- Time zone: UTC-6 (CST)
- Postal code: S0E 0B0
- Area codes: 306 / 639 / 474
- Highways: Highway 35 / Highway 349
- Railways: Canadian Pacific
- Waterways: Barrier Lake, Barrier River, George Williams Lake, Marean Lake, Carps Lake, Nut Lake

Archerwill (2021 population: 153) is a village in the Canadian province of Saskatchewan within the Rural Municipality of Barrier Valley No. 397 and Census Division No. 14. The village is approximately 55 km (30 mi) north of Wadena, 52 km (30 mi) south of Tisdale and 70 km (40 mi) southeast of the city of Melfort. Since 1981 Archerwill has been the administrative centre of the RM of Barrier Valley.

== History ==
The community is named, in a syllabic abbreviation, after the secretary-treasurer and two councilors of the executive governing council of the RM of Barrier Valley in 1924. They were: Archie Campbell and Ervie Hanson, councilors; and William Pierce, secretary-treasurer. Archerwill incorporated as a village on January 1, 1947.

Archerwill is located on the Wadena-to-Tisdale branch line of the Canadian Pacific Railway. However, the nearly 55-year-old railway station was torn down in the early 1980s; and the nearly 60-year-old Saskatchewan Wheat Pool and UGG elevators were torn down in the 1990s.

The Archerwill Café (probably built in the late 1920s), most recently operating as Diner Thirty Five, burned down in a fire on June 23, 2016. The actions of the Archerwill Volunteer Fire Department, along with the Rose Valley Volunteer Fire Department — who arrived from 17 kilometres (11 mi) away — saved the adjacent Archerwill Hotel and the post office.

== Demographics ==
Population history (1981–2021)
| Year | Pop. | ±% |
|---|---|---|
| 1981 | 286 | — |
| 1986 | 284 | −0.7% |
| 1991 | 272 | −4.2% |
| 1996 | 254 | −6.6% |
| 2001 | 215 | −15.4% |
| 2006 | 185 | −14.0% |
| 2011 | 200 | +8.1% |
| 2016 | 166 | −17.0% |
| 2021 | 153 | −7.8% |
Source: Statistics Canada via Saskatchewan Bureau of Statistics

In the 2021 Census of Population conducted by Statistics Canada, Archerwill had a population of 153 living in 78 of its 102 total private dwellings, a change of −7.8% from its 2016 population of 166. With a land area of 0.82 km^{2} (0.32 sq mi), it had a population density of 186.6/km^{2} (483.3/sq mi) in 2021.

In the 2016 Census of Population, the Village of Archerwill recorded a population of 166 living in 82 of its 104 total private dwellings, a −20.5% change from its 2011 population of 200. With a land area of 0.83 km^{2} (0.32 sq mi), it had a population density of 200.0/km^{2} (518.0/sq mi) in 2016.

== Attractions ==
Archerwill has a post office, an indoor ice skating rink with attached curling sheets, a community hall with an attached small public library, and a "Senior Citizens' Centre" social hall.

== Education ==
Archerwill has an elementary school.

== See also ==
- List of communities in Saskatchewan
- List of villages in Saskatchewan
