= Prairie River station =

Railway station in Saskatchewan, Canada

Prairie River

General information
- Location: Railway Street, Prairie River, Porcupine No. 395, Saskatchewan
- Coordinates: 52.8646°N 102.9945°W
- Lines: Canadian Northern Railway (former); Canadian National Railway
- Platforms: 1 side platform
- Tracks: 1

History
- Opened: 1919

Former services
Preceding station	Canadian National Railway	Following station
Bannock toward North Battleford	North Battleford – Winnipeg via Swan River and Hallboro	Greenbush toward Winnipeg
Location

The Prairie River station, located in the hamlet of Prairie River within the rural municipality of Porcupine No. 395, Saskatchewan, was built by the Canadian Northern Railway. The 2-story, wood-frame railway station was completed in 1919. The building is no longer used as a railway station and now houses the Prairie River Museum.
