= Weekes, Saskatchewan =

Village in Saskatchewan, Canada

- Village
- Location of Porcupine Plain in Saskatchewan Weekes, Saskatchewan (Canada)
- Coordinates: 52.340315°N 102.521219°W
- Country: Canada
- Province: Saskatchewan
- Region: East-Central Saskatchewan
- Census division: 14
- Rural Municipality: Porcupine No. 395

Government
  - Governing body: Weekes Village Council

Area
  - Total: 0.59 km^{2} (0.23 sq mi)

Population (2006)
  - Total: 55
  - Density: 92.6/km^{2} (240/sq mi)
- Time zone: CST
- Area code: 306
- Highways: Highway 23
- Railway: Canadian National Railway (abandoned)

Weekes (2016 population: 40) is a village in the Canadian province of Saskatchewan within the Rural Municipality of Porcupine No. 395 and Census Division No. 14. The village is located 29 km east of the town of Porcupine Plain on Highway 23.

== History ==
Weekes incorporated as a village on January 13, 1947.

== Demographics ==
Population history (1981–2016)
Year	Pop.	±%
1981	113	—
1986	108	−4.4%
1991	104	−3.7%
1996	84	−19.2%
2001	65	−22.6%
2006	55	−15.4%
2011	42	−23.6%
2016	40	−4.8%
Source: Statistics Canada via Saskatchewan Bureau of Statistics

In the 2021 Census of Population conducted by Statistics Canada, Weekes had a population of 50 living in 28 of its 64 total private dwellings, a change of 25% from its 2016 population of 40. With a land area of 0.53 km^{2} (0.20 sq mi), it had a population density of 94.3/km^{2} (244.3/sq mi) in 2021.

In the 2016 Census of Population, the Village of Weekes recorded a population of 40 living in 22 of its 57 total private dwellings, a −5% change from its 2011 population of 42. With a land area of 0.59 km^{2} (0.23 sq mi), it had a population density of 67.8/km^{2} (175.6/sq mi) in 2016.

== See also ==
- List of communities in Saskatchewan
- List of hamlets in Saskatchewan
