= Carragana =

Hamlet in Saskatchewan, Canada

Coordinates: 52.581°N 103.105°W

Carragana is a hamlet in the Rural Municipality of Porcupine No. 395, Saskatchewan, Canada. The community had a population of 30 in 2001. It previously held the status of village until March 25, 1998. The hamlet is located 12 km east of the town of Porcupine Plain at the intersection of Highway 23 and Highway 678.

== Demographics ==
Prior to March 25, 1998, Carragana was incorporated as a village, and was restructured as a hamlet under the jurisdiction of the Rural Municipality of Porcupine that date.

Canada census – Carragana community profile

Population
Land area
Population density
Median age
Private dwellings
Median household income

== See also ==
- List of communities in Saskatchewan
- List of hamlets in Saskatchewan
