= Kipabiskau Lake =

Lake in Saskatchewan, Canada

- Stoney Lake
- Location in Saskatchewan Kipabiskau Lake (Canada)
- Location: East-central Saskatchewan
- Coordinates: 52.5685°N 104.1827°W
- Part of: Nelson River drainage basin
- Primary inflows: Barrier River
- Primary outflows: Barrier River
- Basin countries: Canada
- Max. length: 10 km (6.2 mi)
- Max. width: 1 km (0.62 mi)
- Surface area: 494 ha (1,220 acres)
- Max. depth: 11.3 m (37 ft)
- Shore length^{1}: 20.53 km (12.76 mi)
- Surface elevation: 548 m (1,798 ft)
- Settlements: Kipabiskau
- ^{1} Shore length is not a well-defined measure.

Kipabiskau Lake is a narrow lake in the Canadian Province of Saskatchewan along the course of the Barrier River in the Barrier River Valley. The Barrier River is a tributary of the Red Deer River. The western half of the lake is in the RM of Pleasantdale No. 398 and the eastern half is in the RM of Barrier Valley No. 397. The north-western tip of the lake is in the Kinistin 91 Indian reserve. Kipabiskau is Cree for "Stoney".

Along the northern shore of Kipabiskau Lake is the hamlet of Kipabiskau, Kipabiskau Regional Park, and Stoney Lake Bible Camp. Just north of the community and the park is Hidden Meadows Golf Course. Access to the lake and its amenities is from a gravel road off Highway 35.

== Kipabiskau Regional Park ==
Kipabiskau Regional Park (52.5737°N 104.1898°W), commonly referred to as "Kip", is a park on the northern shore of the lake near the community of Kipabiskau. The park has a campground with 62 campsites, nature trails, lake access for water sports and fishing, and, in the winter, snowmobiling and ice fishing. Since the 1920s, the lake had been a popular spot for local tourists. Beginning in the 1940s, volunteers worked to clear the land and create a beach site. At that time, the Tisdale Fish and Game League took control of the developing resort and renamed the lake and the resort from 'Stoney Lake' to 'Kipabiskau Lake'. In 1965, it became a regional park.

== Fish species ==
Fish commonly found in Kipabiskau Lake include northern pike, yellow perch, and walleye.

== See also ==
- List of lakes of Saskatchewan
- Tourism in Saskatchewan
