= Round Lake (RM of Kelvington, Saskatchewan) =

Lake in Saskatchewan, Canada

- Location in Saskatchewan Round Lake (Canada)
- Location: RM of Kelvington No. 366, Saskatchewan
- Coordinates: 52.3639°N 103.4027°W
- Part of: Nelson River drainage basin
- Basin countries: Canada
- Surface area: 475.4 ha (1,175 acres)
- Max. depth: 4.6 m (15 ft)
- Water volume: 10,855 dam^{3} (8,800 acre⋅ft)
- Shore length^{1}: 8.6 km (5.3 mi)
- Surface elevation: 589 m (1,932 ft)
- Settlements: None
- ^{1} Shore length is not a well-defined measure.

Round Lake is a lake in the Canadian province of Saskatchewan within the Rural Municipality of Kelvington No. 366. The lake is at the western edge of the Porcupine Hills and Porcupine Provincial Forest in the Mid-Boreal Upland ecozone. It is 18 kilometres (11 mi) south of Greenwater Lake Provincial Park and 24 kilometres (15 mi) north-northeast of Kelvington. There are no communities along the lake's shore and access is from a gravel road off Highway 38.

Round Lake is fed by streams that flow in from the surrounding hills. The outflow, which begins at Round Lake Dam, is a river that flows out from the western shore and then south-west into Little Nut Lake. Prairie Butte Creek connects Little Nut Lake to Nut Lake, which is the source of the Red Deer River.

At the northern end of Round Lake is Camp Saskadet. Saskadet is a Tri-Service Provincial Cadet Camp used by Air, Army, and Sea Cadets. The eastern half of the lake, and a small section on the western shore, is within the provincially protected Round Lake Recreation Site (52.3594°N 103.3926°W).

== Round Lake Dam ==
Round Lake Dam (52.3578°N 103.4242°W) was built at Round Lake's outflow in 1941 to regulate the lake's levels. The dam is 2 m (6 ft 7 in) high and went through upgrades in 1973 and 2000. In 2024, a project was begun to replace the bridge deck and support structure at the dam.

== Fish species ==
Fish commonly found in Round Lake include walleye, northern pike, and white sucker. The lake was most recently stocked in 2023 with 200,000 walleye fry.

== See also ==
- List of lakes of Saskatchewan
- Saskatchewan Water Security Agency
- List of dams and reservoirs in Canada
