= Wadena (electoral district) =

Former provincial electoral district in Saskatchewan, Canada

Saskatchewan electoral district

Wadena was a provincial electoral district in Saskatchewan, Canada. It was created for the 1908 election and was dissolved into Kelvington-Wadena in 1975.

== Members of the Legislative Assembly ==
This riding has elected the following members to the Legislative Assembly of Saskatchewan:

#	MLA	Served	Party
1.	Herbert Pierce	1908–1917	Liberal
2.	John MacMillan	1917–1921	Liberal
3.	William Henry McKinnon	1921–1925	Progressive
4.	William Henry McKinnon	1925–1929	Liberal
5.	John Robeson Taylor	1929–1934	Independent
6.	George Hara Williams	1934–sept. 1945	Farmer-Labour/CCF
7.	Frederick Dewhurst	nov. 1945–1975	CCF/NDP

== See also ==
- List of Saskatchewan provincial electoral districts
- List of Saskatchewan general elections
- Canadian provincial electoral districts
