= Charron Lake (Saskatchewan) =

Lake in Saskatchewan, Canada

- Location in Saskatchewan Charron Lake (Canada)
- Coordinates: 52.4033°N 104.3032°W
- Type: Endorheic lake
- Part of: Saskatchewan River drainage basin
- Primary outflows: None
- Basin countries: Canada
- Surface area: 402.6 ha (995 acres)
- Max. depth: 5.8 m (19 ft)
- Shore length^{1}: 18.4 km (11.4 mi)
- Surface elevation: 574 m (1,883 ft)
- Settlements: None
- ^{1} Shore length is not a well-defined measure.

Charron Lake is a lake in the Canadian province of Saskatchewan. The northern part of the lake is in the RM of Pleasantdale No. 398 while the southern part is in the RM of Spalding No. 368. Naicam, the nearest town to the lake, is about 13 kilometres (8.1 mi) to the west. There is a regional park on the island in the middle of the lake. Access to Charron Lake and its amenities is from Highway 349.

Charron Lake is in the Aspen parkland ecozone of Saskatchewan and is in a forest of birch and poplar trees.

== Lake Charron Regional Park ==
Lake Charron Regional Park (52.4099°N 104.3112°W), established in 1972, is located on the island in the middle of the lake and is connected to the mainland via a causeway. The park has a campground, picnic area, cabins, nature trails, boat launch, and a beach for swimming. The campground has 58 campsites and 10 group campsites.

== See also ==
- List of lakes of Saskatchewan
- List of protected areas of Saskatchewan
- Tourism in Saskatchewan
