= Barrier Lake (Saskatchewan) =

Lake in Saskatchewan, Canada

- Location in Saskatchewan Barrier Lake (Canada)
- Location: East-central Saskatchewan
- Coordinates: 52.5189°N 103.7834°W
- Part of: Red Deer River drainage basin
- Primary inflows: Barrier River
- Primary outflows: Barrier River
- Basin countries: Canada
- Max. width: 500 m (1,600 ft)
- Surface area: 736 ha (1,820 acres)
- Max. depth: 11.3 m (37 ft)
- Shore length^{1}: 140.7 km (87.4 mi)
- Surface elevation: 518 m (1,699 ft)
- Settlements: Barrier Ford
- ^{1} Shore length is not a well-defined measure.

Barrier Lake is a lake along the course of the Barrier River in the Canadian province of Saskatchewan. The Barrier River is a tributary of the Red Deer River. Barrier Lake is in the aspen parkland ecoregion about 65 kilometres (40 mi) east-southeast of the city of Melfort. The western part of the lake is within the Rural Municipality of Barrier Valley No. 397 while the eastern is within the Rural Municipality of Bjorkdale No. 426. There two communities on the lake and one resort. Access is from Highway 652.

== Description ==
Barrier Lake is a long, narrow lake that snakes along the floor of the Barrier River Valley. The Barrier River flows in from the west and flows out at the lake's eastern end. Barrier Lake has a maximum depth of 11.3 metres (37 ft), a shore length measuring about 140.7 kilometres (87.4 mi), and covers an area of 736 hectares (1,820 acres).

The small community of Barrier Ford is at the eastern end of Barrier Lake — at the lake's outflow — and the subdivision of Barrier Lake View Resort is about 3.5 kilometres (2.2 mi) to the west of Barrier Ford on the southern shore. The resort of Barrier Lake is also on the southern shore, but closer to the central part of the lake. Highway 652 accesses the resort.

== Fish species ==
Fish commonly found in Barrier Lake include rainbow trout, northern pike, walleye, white sucker, common carp, and yellow perch.

== See also ==
- List of lakes of Saskatchewan
- Tourism in Saskatchewan
