= Fosston =

Fosston may refer to:

== Place ==
- Fosston, Minnesota, Polk county town
- Fosston, Saskatchewan, village
