= Neil Erland Byers =

Canadian politician (1928–2020)

The Honourable Neil Erland Byers ECS

MLA for Kelvington
- In office 1969–1975

Personal details
- Born: December 7, 1928 Fertile, Saskatchewan
- Died: July 3, 2020 (aged 91) Regina, Saskatchewan
- Party: Saskatchewan New Democratic Party

Neil Erland Byers (December 7, 1928 – July 3, 2020) was a Canadian educator and political figure in Saskatchewan. He represented Kelvington from 1969 to 1975 and Kelvington-Wadena from 1975 to 1982 in the Legislative Assembly of Saskatchewan as a New Democratic Party (NDP) member.

He was born in Fertile, Saskatchewan, the son of Newton Byers and Kathleen McDonald, and was educated there, in Frobisher, at the Moose Jaw Normal School and at the University of Saskatchewan, where he received a BEd. Byers worked as a teacher with the Department of Indian Affairs and taught school at Foam Lake. He also worked seven years for the Co-operative Hail Insurance Company of Saskatchewan as a hail adjuster. In 1952, he married Margaret Engelke.

Byers ran unsuccessfully for a seat in the provincial assembly in 1964 and 1967 before being elected in a 1969 by-election held after the results of the 1967 election were declared invalid. He served in the provincial cabinet as Minister of Highways and Transportation, as Minister of Telephones, as Minister of the Environment, as Minister of Co-operation and Co-operative Development and as Minister of Northern Saskatchewan. Byers resigned his cabinet post in 1979. He was defeated by Sherwin Petersen when he ran for reelection to the Saskatchewan assembly in 1982. He later lived in Regina, and died on July 3, 2020.
