= Kenneth Kluz =

Canadian politician

MLA for Kelvington-Wadena
- In office 1991–1995
- Preceded by: Sherwin Petersen
- Succeeded by: June Draude

Personal details
- Born: April 6, 1956 (age 70) Foam Lake, Saskatchewan
- Party: Saskatchewan New Democratic Party

Kenneth Alan Kluz (born April 6, 1956) was a Canadian politician. He served in the Legislative Assembly of Saskatchewan from 1991 to 1995, as a NDP member for the constituency of Kelvington-Wadena. After the province redrew the constituency's boundaries, Kluz lost his nomination to Dale Flavel for the seat of Last Mountain-Touchwood.

In 1999, Kluz switched parties and ran for the Saskatchewan Liberals.
