= Kerry Clark (ice hockey) =

Canadian ice hockey player

- Born: August 21, 1968 (age 57) Kelvington, Saskatchewan, Canada
- Height: 6 ft 1 in (185 cm)
- Weight: 205 lb (93 kg; 14 st 9 lb)
- Position: Left wing
- Shot: Right
- Played for: Springfield Indians; Phoenix Roadrunners; Salt Lake Golden Eagles; Portland Pirates; Orlando Solar Bears; Milwaukee Admirals
- NHL draft: 206th overall, 1986; New York Islanders
- Playing career: 1988–1998

Kerry Clark (born August 21, 1968) is a Canadian former professional ice hockey player, notable as one of the most penalized players in minor league history.

== Personal life ==
Clark was born and raised in Saskatchewan, the youngest of three hockey-playing brothers. His oldest brother, Wendel Clark, starred in the National Hockey League with the Toronto Maple Leafs and the Quebec Nordiques. Another brother, Donn Clark, was a player and coach for the Western Hockey League Saskatoon Blades, and died from cancer in 2019.

== History ==
=== Junior career ===
Clark began his major junior career in 1984 with the Regina Pats of the Western Hockey League. Seeing minimal action his first two seasons, he was traded in the middle of the 85-86 season to the Saskatoon Blades, the team for which both his older brothers had played. Joining a squad with a number of notably rough players - his teammates included Kelly Chase, Tony Twist and Kevin Kaminski - he skated a more regular shift and played credibly for the Blades for two and a half seasons.

=== Professional career ===
Drafted in the tenth round of the 1986 NHL entry draft by the New York Islanders, Clark reported to their minor league affiliate, the Springfield Indians of the American Hockey League, for the 1989 season. Playing for a team which won more fights than games, Clark's hardnosed style made him a fan favorite in Springfield. Aside from his fighting prowess - - although he scored only seven goals that season, he became noted for performing the Michael Jackson "moonwalk" on the ice after scoring a goal, first seen in a training camp exhibition match against the New York Rangers, a habit that throughout his career proved as unpopular with opposing players as it was popular with hometown fans.

The following season, a more powerful Indians team that went on to win the 1990 Calder Cup championship had little room for Clark, and he finished the year with the Phoenix Roadrunners of the International Hockey League, amassing 262 penalty minutes in only 38 games. He remained in the IHL for the next three seasons, with the Salt Lake Golden Eagles. Clark played his best seasons in Utah, averaging 13 goals a year.

Clark returned to the AHL with the Portland Pirates, signing a minor league deal, in 1993, playing two seasons with that club as one of the "Bruise Brothers" before moving on to the Orlando Solar Bears of the IHL in 1995. Clark finished his career with the Milwaukee Admirals of the IHL in 1998, retiring after a vicious hit left him with a broken neck that almost paralyzed him.

Clark retired as one of the most penalized players of all time; he is 15th in International Hockey League history in penalty minutes and remains in the top 60 in minor league history in penalty minutes with 2812. Post playing career, he has spent time since as a hockey coach, first as Head Coach of the OCN Blizzard of the MJHL, followed by being an assistant coach for the Prince George Cougars of the WHL in the mid-2000s.
