= Sherwin Petersen =

Canadian politician

Sherwin Holger Petersen (born May 12, 1953) is a farmer and former political figure in Saskatchewan, Canada. He represented Kelvington-Wadena from 1982 to 1991 in the Legislative Assembly of Saskatchewan as a Progressive Conservative.

He was born in Rose Valley, Saskatchewan, the son of Orla Peterson and was educated at the Kelsey Institute in Saskatoon. Peterson operated a farm in the Rose Valley district. In 1973, he married Sharon Ann Wheeler. He served in the provincial cabinet as Minister of Highways and Transportation. Peterson was defeated by Kenneth Kluz when he ran for reelection to the Saskatchewan assembly in 1991. After leaving politics, he returned to farming and also operated an air seeder business. In 1993, he ran unsuccessfully for the Mackenzie seat in the Canadian House of Commons.

Peterson was granted a conditional discharge and ordered to repay $9,285 in the aftermath of the Saskatchewan Progressive Conservative fraud scandal.
