= Rural Municipality of Porcupine No. 395 =

Rural municipality in Saskatchewan, Canada

Porcupine No. 395
- Rural municipality
- Rural Municipality of Porcupine No. 395
- Location of the RM of Porcupine No. 395 in Saskatchewan
- Coordinates: 52.595°N 103.121°W
- Country: Canada
- Province: Saskatchewan
- Census division: 14
- SARM division: 4
- Formed: February 28, 1944

Government
  - Reeve: Steve Kwiatkowski
  - Governing body: RM of Porcupine No. 395 Council
  - Administrator: Nicole Smith
  - Office location: Porcupine Plain

Area (2016)
  - Land: 2,339.96 km^{2} (903.46 sq mi)

Population (2016)
  - Total: 803
  - Density: 0.3/km^{2} (0.78/sq mi)
- Time zone: CST
  - Summer (DST): CST
- Area codes: 306 and 639

The Rural Municipality of Porcupine No. 395 (2016 population: 803) is a rural municipality (RM) in the Canadian province of Saskatchewan within Census Division No. 14 and SARM Division No. 4. It is located in the northeast-central portion of the province.

== History ==
The RM of Porcupine No. 395 incorporated as a rural municipality on February 28, 1944.

== Geography ==
=== Communities and localities ===
The following urban municipalities are surrounded by the RM.

Towns

- Porcupine Plain

Villages

- Weekes

The following unincorporated communities are within the RM.

Organized hamlets

- Prairie River

Localities

- Carragana, dissolved as a village, March 25, 1998
- Dillabough
- Somme

== Demographics ==
Population history (1981–2016)
Year	Pop.	±%
1981	1,750	—
1986	1,559	−10.9%
1991	1,321	−15.3%
1996	1,150	−12.9%
2001	1,096	−4.7%
2006	949	−13.4%
2011	820	−13.6%
2016	803	−2.1%
Source: Statistics Canada via Saskatchewan Bureau of Statistics

In the 2021 Census of Population conducted by Statistics Canada, the RM of Porcupine No. 395 had a population of 736 living in 328 of its 463 total private dwellings, a change of −8.3% from its 2016 population of 803. With a land area of 2,316.38 km^{2} (894.36 sq mi), it had a population density of 0.3/km^{2} (0.8/sq mi) in 2021.

In the 2016 Census of Population, the RM of Porcupine No. 395 recorded a population of 803 living in 359 of its 471 total private dwellings, a −2.1% change from its 2011 population of 820. With a land area of 2,339.96 km^{2} (903.46 sq mi), it had a population density of 0.3/km^{2} (0.9/sq mi) in 2016.

== Government ==
The RM of Porcupine No. 395 is governed by an elected municipal council and an appointed administrator that meets on the first Thursday of every month. The reeve of the RM is Steve Kwiatkowski while its administrator is Nicole Smith. The RM's office is located in Porcupine Plain.

== Transportation ==
- Highway 23 - serves Carragana and Prairie River
- Highway 677 - serves Carragana
- Highway 38

== See also ==
- List of rural municipalities in Saskatchewan
