= Prairie River, Saskatchewan =

Community in Saskatchewan, Canada

Coordinates: 52°51′41″N 102°59′35″W

Prairie River is a hamlet in Saskatchewan, Canada. It is north of Highway 3 along the banks of the Prairie River in the Rural Municipality of Porcupine No. 395. The Prairie River is a tributary of the Red Deer River.

== Geography ==
Prairie River is 1510 ft (460 meters) above sea level, and is located in the Central Standard time zone, or CST. It does not observe daylight saving time.

== History ==
The former Prairie River railway station is now used to house the Prairie River Museum. The hamlet sits on an inactive Canadian National Railway line that was built and originally operated by the Canadian Northern Railway. Prairie River was also the junction for the Shaw Logging Railroad, which transported wood for the mills in the area.

== Demographics ==
In the 2021 Canadian census, Prairie River had a population of 70 living in 37 of its 42 total private dwellings, a change of 27.3% from its 2016 population of 55. With a land area of 0.16 km^{2} (0.062 sq mi), it had a population density of 437.5/km^{2} (1,133.1/sq mi) in 2021.

== Notable people ==
- Bob Poley, a former CFL Saskatchewan Roughriders player

== See also ==
- List of communities in Saskatchewan
