= Bertwell =

Community in Saskatchewan, Canada

Coordinates: 52°35′46″N 102°34′48″W

Location of Bertwell in Saskatchewan

Bertwell is an unincorporated community in Saskatchewan, Canada. The community is at the southern terminus of Highway 23 on the banks of the Etomami River.

== See also ==
- List of communities in Saskatchewan
