= Rural Municipality of Ponass Lake No. 367 =

Rural municipality in Saskatchewan, Canada

Ponass Lake No. 367
- Rural municipality
- Rural Municipality of Ponass Lake No. 367
- Location of the RM of Ponass Lake No. 367 in Saskatchewan
- Coordinates: 52.312°N 103.821°W
- Country: Canada
- Province: Saskatchewan
- Census division: 14
- SARM division: 4
- Formed: January 1, 1913

Government
  - Reeve: Allan Nelson
  - Governing body: RM of Ponass Lake No. 367 Council
  - Administrator: Loretta Prevost
  - Office location: Rose Valley

Area (2016)
  - Land: 750.62 km^{2} (289.82 sq mi)

Population (2016)
  - Total: 422
  - Density: 0.6/km^{2} (1.6/sq mi)
- Time zone: CST
  - Summer (DST): CST
- Area codes: 306 and 639

The Rural Municipality of Ponass Lake No. 367 (2016 population: 422) is a rural municipality (RM) in the Canadian province of Saskatchewan within Census Division No. 14 and SARM Division No. 4.

== History ==
The RM of Ponass Lake No. 367 incorporated as a rural municipality on January 1, 1913.

== Geography ==
=== Communities and localities ===
The following urban municipalities are surrounded by the RM.

Towns

- Rose Valley

Villages

- Fosston

The following unincorporated communities are within the RM.

Localities

- Cuvier
- Nora
- Scrip

== Demographics ==
Population history (1981–2016)
Year	Pop.	±%
1981	1,156	—
1986	997	−13.8%
1991	854	−14.3%
1996	767	−10.2%
2001	681	−11.2%
2006	618	−9.3%
2011	527	−14.7%
2016	422	−19.9%
Source: Statistics Canada via Saskatchewan Bureau of Statistics

In the 2021 Census of Population conducted by Statistics Canada, the RM of Ponass Lake No. 367 had a population of 416 living in 192 of its 227 total private dwellings, a change of −1.4% from its 2016 population of 422. With a land area of 795.56 km^{2} (307.17 sq mi), it had a population density of 0.5/km^{2} (1.4/sq mi) in 2021.

In the 2016 Census of Population, the RM of Ponass Lake No. 367 recorded a population of 422 living in 190 of its 238 total private dwellings, a −15.9% change from its 2011 population of 502. With a land area of 750.62 km^{2} (289.82 sq mi), it had a population density of 0.6/km^{2} (1.5/sq mi) in 2016.

== Attractions ==
- Rose Valley & District Heritage Museum
- Ponass Lake Heritage Marsh

== Government ==
The RM of Ponass Lake No. 367 is governed by an elected municipal council and an appointed administrator that meets on the second Wednesday of every month. The reeve of the RM is Allan Nelson while its administrator is Loretta Prevost. The RM's office is located in Rose Valley.

== Transportation ==
- Saskatchewan Highway 35
- Saskatchewan Highway 49
- Saskatchewan Highway 756
- Canadian Pacific Railway

== See also ==
- List of rural municipalities in Saskatchewan
