= Kinistin 91 =

Indian reserve in Saskatchewan, Canada

Coordinates: 52°36′30″N 104°12′44″W

- Indian reserve
- Kinistin Indian Reserve No. 91
- Location in Saskatchewan
- First Nation: Kinistin
- Country: Canada
- Province: Saskatchewan

Area
  - Total: 3,626.8 ha (8,962 acres)

Population (2016)
  - Total: 321
  - Density: 8.85/km^{2} (22.9/sq mi)
- Community Well-Being Index: 46

Kinistin 91 is an Indian reserve of the Kinistin Saulteaux Nation in Saskatchewan. It is about 39 kilometres (24 mi) south-east of Melfort. The Barrier River runs through the reserve and empties into the western end of Kipabiskau Lake.

In the 2016 Canadian Census, it recorded a population of 321 living in 82 of its 90 total private dwellings. In the same year, its Community Well-Being index was calculated at 46 of 100, compared to 58.4 for the average First Nations community and 77.5 for the average non-Indigenous community.

== See also ==
- List of Indian reserves in Saskatchewan
