= Shaw Brothers Lumber Company =

In Manitoba Escarpment

- Company type: Private
- Industry: Forestry
- Founded: 1889
- Founder: Thomas Shaw; James Shaw
- Defunct: 1919
- Fate: Dissolved

The Shaw Brothers Lumber Company was a forestry company that had logging operations and sawmills along the Manitoba Escarpment.

== Manitoba Operations ==
James and Thomas Shaw began their careers as flour millers and sawmillers in Ontario.

In 1889, they moved to Dauphin, MB and opened a flour mill and a sawmill on the Valley River. Logs for the sawmill were cut down in the Duck Mountains, and were then floated down the river to the sawmill.

In 1899, they moved their mill to Edwards Creek at the base of the Riding Mountains. By 1914, they had stopped their operations in Manitoba to focus on their operations in the Northwest Territories.

== Northwest Territories Operations ==
In 1901, the brothers began logging in the Pasquia Hills, north of Prairie River, Saskatchewan, in what was then the District of Saskatchewan in the Northwest Territories. A saw- and planing-mill was also built near Prairie River.

In 1906 (the year after Saskatchewan became a province), they built their own railway called the Shaw Logging Railroad to transport logs to their mill, and finished product from their mill to the Canadian Northern Railway line that ran between Erwood and Melfort. They owned and used two Type B Geared Shay Locomotives, which were able to run fully loaded on grades up to 12%. In addition to wood, they also used to transport passengers.

By 1920, their Saskatchewan operations had also closed down.
