= Kelvington (electoral district) =

Former provincial electoral district in Saskatchewan, Canada

- Electoral district
- Country: Canada
- Province: Saskatchewan
- Established: 1934

Kelvington was a provincial electoral district in Saskatchewan, Canada. It was created for the 1934 election and was dissolved into Kelvington-Wadena in 1975.

== Members of the Legislative Assembly ==
This riding has elected the following members of the Legislative Assembly of Saskatchewan:

#	MLA	Served	Party
1.	George Ernest Dragan	1934–1938	Liberal
2.	Peter Howe	1938–1960	CCF
3.	Cliff Peterson	1960–1964	CCF
4.	Bryan Bjarnason	1964–1969	Liberal
5.	Neil Byers	June 1969 – 1975	New Democrat

== See also ==
- List of Saskatchewan provincial electoral districts
- List of Saskatchewan general elections
- Canadian provincial electoral districts
