= Rose Valley, Saskatchewan =

Town in Saskatchewan, Canada

Rose Valley
- Town
- Location of Rose Valley in Saskatchewan Rose Valley (Canada)
- Coordinates: 52°17′23″N 103°48′55″W
- Country: Canada
- Provinces and territories of Canada: Saskatchewan
- Census division: 14
- Rural municipalities (RM): Ponass Lake No. 367
- Post office Founded: 1916-01-01
- Village Established: 1940
- Town Status: 1962

Government
  - Mayor: Daniel Veilleux
  - MP, Yorkton—Melville: Cathay Wagantall
  - MLA, Kelvington-Wadena: Chris Beaudry

Area
  - Total: 1.12 km^{2} (0.43 sq mi)

Population (2016)
  - Total: 282
  - Density: 263.4/km^{2} (682/sq mi)
  - Summer (DST): CST
- Postal code: S0E 1M0
- Area codes: 306 / 639
- Highways: Highway 35, Secondary Highway 756
- Website: www.townofrosevalley.com

Rose Valley is a town in the Rural Municipality of Ponass Lake No. 367, in the Canadian province of Saskatchewan. Rose Valley is located at the intersection of Highway 35 and Primary Grid 746 in east-central Saskatchewan. Wheat and dairy are the main economic industries in the area.

== History ==
The CPR arrived in 1924, but as early as 1904 and 1905 Norwegian and Ukrainian settlers began to arrive by Red River cart. Rose Valley enjoyed its peak growth in the 1960s.

== Demographics ==
In the 2021 Census of Population conducted by Statistics Canada, Rose Valley had a population of 256 living in 113 of its 141 total private dwellings, a change of −9.2% from its 2016 population of 282. With a land area of 1.05 km^{2} (0.41 sq mi), it had a population density of 243.8/km^{2} (631.5/sq mi) in 2021.

Canada census – Rose Valley community profile

	2021	2011
Population	256 (-9.2% from 2016)	296 (-12.4% from 2006)
Land area	1.05 km^{2} (0.41 sq mi)	1.12 km^{2} (0.43 sq mi)
Population density	244.7/km^{2} (634/sq mi)	263.4/km^{2} (682/sq mi)
Median age	51.2 (M: 52, F: 49.2)	52.7 (M: 46.6, F: 55.5)
Private dwellings	110 (total)	153 (total)
Median household income

References: 2021 2011

== Sites of interest ==
About 8 kilometres (5.0 mi) west of Rose Valley is Ponass Lake Heritage Marsh.

== Education ==
Rose Valley School offers Kindergarten to Grade 12. The School is located in the Horizon School Division. In 2003 the school received $250,000 in repairs and renovations from the provincial government. The area is serviced by the Parkland Regional Library Rose Valley Branch.

== Notable people ==
- David A. Gall — Canadian Horse Racing Hall of Fame jockey
- Gary Fjellgaard — Canadian country music singer-songwriter

== See also ==
- List of francophone communities in Saskatchewan

== Book references ==
- "A Tribute To Our Pioneers." History of Rose Valley and District, 1981
