= June Draude =

Canadian politician

The Honourable June Draude ECS

Member of the Saskatchewan Legislative Assembly for Kelvington-Wadena
- In office June 21, 1995 – April 4, 2016
- Preceded by: Kenneth Kluz
- Succeeded by: Hugh Nerlien

Minister of Social Services
- In office June 29, 2010 – June 5, 2014
- Preceded by: Donna Harpauer
- Succeeded by: Donna Harpauer

Personal details
- Born: March 17, 1949 (age 77)
- Party: Saskatchewan Party (1997-current)
- Other political affiliations: Liberal (1995-1997)

June Draude (born March 17, 1949) is a Canadian retired politician. She was the Saskatchewan Party member of the Legislative Assembly of Saskatchewan for the constituency of Kelvington-Wadena.

First elected in 1995 as a Liberal MLA, she joined the Saskatchewan Party caucus upon their formation in 1997. Draude successfully defended her seat in the 1999, 2003, 2007 and 2011 Saskatchewan elections.

On November 21, 2007, Draude was appointed Minister of First Nations and Métis Relations and Minister for Northern Affairs under Premier Brad Wall. In a cabinet shuffle on May 29, 2009, Draude was appointed Provincial Secretary and Minister Responsible for the Crown Corporations, Saskatchewan Government Insurance, the Information Technology Office, and the Public Service Commission. In another cabinet shuffle on June 29, 2010, Draude was named Minister of Social Services and Minister Responsible for the Status of Women and the Public Service Commission.

During her fourth term in office, Draude had to repay $3,600 for a London-based car service she used for personal reasons while in the United Kingdom on government business.
