= Hugh Nerlien =

Canadian politician

Member of the Saskatchewan Legislative Assembly for Kelvington-Wadena
- In office April 4, 2016 – October 1, 2024
- Preceded by: June Draude
- Succeeded by: Chris Beaudry

Personal details
- Born: Kelvington, Saskatchewan
- Party: Saskatchewan Party
- Education: Saskatchewan Polytechnic
- Profession: banker and politician

Hugh Nerlien is a Canadian politician, who was elected to the Legislative Assembly of Saskatchewan in the 2016 provincial election and remained an MLA until 2024, when he declined to run for an additional term in office. He represented the electoral district of Kelvington-Wadena, as a member of the Saskatchewan Party.

== Background ==
Nerlien was born in Kelvington, Saskatchewan. He is currently married, and has two sons and one daughter. Nerlien holds a diploma in business administration from Saskatchewan Polytechnic, and prior to election to the Legislature worked in the banking sector.

== Electoral history ==
=== 2016 Saskatchewan general election ===
2016 Saskatchewan general election: Kelvington-Wadena
Party	Candidate	Votes	%	±%
Saskatchewan	Hugh Nerlien	5,133	69.97	-8.75
New Democratic	Danny Hiscock	1,354	18.45	+0.09
Progressive Conservative	Tim Atchinson	390	5.31	+5.31
Western Independence	Walter Hrappsted	218	2.97	+2.97
Liberal	Bernie Yuzdepski	132	1.79	+1.79
Green	Owen Swiderski	108	1.47	-1.45
Total valid votes		7,335	100.0	
Eligible voters		–		
Saskatchewan hold		Swing		-
Source: Elections Saskatchewan
