= No. 354 Squadron RAF =

Squadron of the Royal Air Force

- Consolidated Liberator
- Active: 10 May 1943 – 18 May 1945
- Country: United Kingdom
- Branch: Royal Air Force
- Role: Reconnaissance
- Part of: No. 225 Group RAF, South East Asia Command

Insignia
- Squadron Codes: No identity markings are known to have been carried

Aircraft flown
- Patrol: Consolidated Liberator
- Reconnaissance: Consolidated Liberator

No. 354 Squadron RAF was a general reconnaissance squadron of the Royal Air Force during the Second World War.

== History ==
No. 354 squadron was first formed at Drigh Road, Karachi on 10 May 1943 as part of Coastal Command, and was posted to RAF Station Cuttack on 17 August 1943, where it received Liberator Mk.V bombers. Detachments of the squadron were located at Sigiriya and St Thomas Mount. The squadron redeployed to Minneriya in Ceylon on 12 October 1944, with detachments at Kankesanturai and Cuttack, and returned to Cuttack whilst maintaining a detachment at Kankesanterai in January 1945, where they received the Liberator Mk.VI. The squadron was disbanded on 18 May 1945 at RAF Cuttack.

== Aircraft operated ==
Aircraft operated by no. 354 Squadron RAF, data from
From	To	Aircraft	Version
August 1943	August 1944	Consolidated Liberator	Mk.V
December 1943	April 1944	Consolidated Liberator	Mk.IIIa
February 1944	May 1945	Consolidated Liberator	Mk.VI

== Squadron airfields ==
Stations and airfields used by No. 354 Squadron RAF, data from
From	To	Airfield	Remark
10 May 1943	17 August 1943	RAF Drigh Road, Karachi	Formed here
17 August 1943	12 October 1944	RAF Cuttack, Orissa	Det. at Sigiriya, Ceylon and St Thomas Mount, Madras, Tamil Nadu
12 October 1944	5 January 1945	Minneriya, Ceylon	Det. at RAF Kankesanturai, Ceylon and Cuttack, Orissa
5 January 1945	18 May 1945	Cuttack, Orissa	Det. at Kankesanturai

== Commanding officer ==
Officers commanding No. 354 Squadron RAF, data from
From	To	Name
July 1943	May 1944	W/Cdr. K.J. Mellor, DFC
May 1944	March 1945	W/Cdr. D.T. MacPherson
March 1945	May 1945	W/Cdr. F.G. Paisey
