= Kipabiskau =

Community in Saskatchewan, Canada

Coordinates: 52.5693°N 104.1771°W

Kipabiskau is a hamlet in the Rural Municipality of Pleasantdale No. 398, Saskatchewan, Canada. It previously held the status of a village until April 30, 1973. The hamlet is located on the north shore of Kipabiskau Lake, about 28 kilometres (17 mi) east of the village of Pleasantdale on Highway 773.

== Demographics ==
Prior to April 30, 1973, Kipabiskau was incorporated as a village, and was restructured as a hamlet under the jurisdiction of the RM of Pleasantdale on that date.

Canada census – Kipabiskau community profile

Population
Land area
Population density
Median age
Private dwellings
Median household income

== See also ==
- List of communities in Saskatchewan
- List of hamlets in Saskatchewan
