= Barrier Ford =

Community in Saskatchewan, Canada

- Hamlet
- Barrier Ford Barrier Ford (Canada)
- Coordinates: 52°31′59″N 103°42′03″W
- Country: Canada
- Province: Saskatchewan
- Census division: Division No. 14
- Rural Municipality: Bjorkdale No. 426

Population (2006)
  - Total: 40
- Time zone: CST
- Area code: 306

Barrier Ford is a hamlet in the Canadian province of Saskatchewan. It is at the eastern end of Barrier Lake. The "Ford" in the community's name refers to a nearby ford of the Barrier River.

== Demographics ==
In the 2021 Census of Population conducted by Statistics Canada, Barrier Ford had a population of 30 living in 19 of its 125 total private dwellings, a change of 50% from its 2016 population of 20. With a land area of 0.17 km^{2} (0.066 sq mi), it had a population density of 176.5/km^{2} (457.1/sq mi) in 2021.

== See also ==
- List of communities in Saskatchewan
