= Rural Municipality of Pleasantdale No. 398 =

Rural municipality in Saskatchewan, Canada

Pleasantdale No. 398
- Rural municipality
- Rural Municipality of Pleasantdale No. 398
- Location of the RM of Pleasantdale No. 398 in Saskatchewan
- Coordinates: 52.550°N 104.34°W
- Country: Canada
- Province: Saskatchewan
- Census division: 14
- SARM division: 4
- Formed: December 11, 1911

Government
  - Reeve: Fred Graham
  - Governing body: RM of Pleasantdale No. 398 Council
  - Administrator: Debra Parry
  - Office location: Naicam

Area (2016)
  - Land: 757.91 km^{2} (292.63 sq mi)

Population (2016)
  - Total: 596
  - Density: 0.8/km^{2} (2.1/sq mi)
- Time zone: CST
  - Summer (DST): CST
- Area codes: 306 and 639

The Rural Municipality of Pleasantdale No. 398 (2016 population: 596) is a rural municipality (RM) in the Canadian province of Saskatchewan within Census Division No. 14 and SARM Division No. 4.

== History ==
The RM of Pleasantdale No. 398 incorporated as a rural municipality on December 11, 1911.

== Geography ==
=== Communities and localities ===
The following urban municipalities are surrounded by the RM.

Towns

- Naicam

Villages

- Pleasantdale

The following unincorporated communities are within the RM

Localities

- Chagoness
- Kipabiskau, dissolved as a village, April 30, 1973
- Lac Vert
- Silver Park

== Demographics ==
Population history (1981–2016)
| Year | Pop. | ±% |
|---|---|---|
| 1981 | 984 | — |
| 1986 | 996 | +1.2% |
| 1991 | 781 | −21.6% |
| 1996 | 709 | −9.2% |
| 2001 | 673 | −5.1% |
| 2006 | 607 | −9.8% |
| 2011 | 611 | +0.7% |
| 2016 | 596 | −2.5% |
Source: Statistics Canada via Saskatchewan Bureau of Statistics

In the 2021 Census of Population conducted by Statistics Canada, the RM of Pleasantdale No. 398 had a population of 599 living in 258 of its 301 total private dwellings, a change of 0.5% from its 2016 population of 596. With a land area of 755.6 km^{2} (291.7 sq mi), it had a population density of 0.8/km^{2} (2.1/sq mi) in 2021.

In the 2016 Census of Population, the RM of Pleasantdale No. 398 recorded a population of 596 living in 250 of its 471 total private dwellings, a −2.5% change from its 2011 population of 611. With a land area of 757.91 km^{2} (292.63 sq mi), it had a population density of 0.8/km^{2} (2.0/sq mi) in 2016.

== Attractions ==
- Naicam Museum
- Lake Charron Regional Park
- Kipabiskau Regional Park

== Government ==
The RM of Pleasantdale No. 398 is governed by an elected municipal council and an appointed administrator that meets on the second Thursday of every month. The reeve of the RM is Fred Graham while its administrator is Debra Parry. The RM's office is located in Naicam.

== Transportation ==
- Saskatchewan Highway 6
- Saskatchewan Highway 349
- Saskatchewan Highway 773
- Saskatchewan Highway 777
- Canadian Pacific Railway
- Naicam Airport

== See also ==
- List of rural municipalities in Saskatchewan
