= Naicam =

Town in Saskatchewan, Canada

Town of Naicam
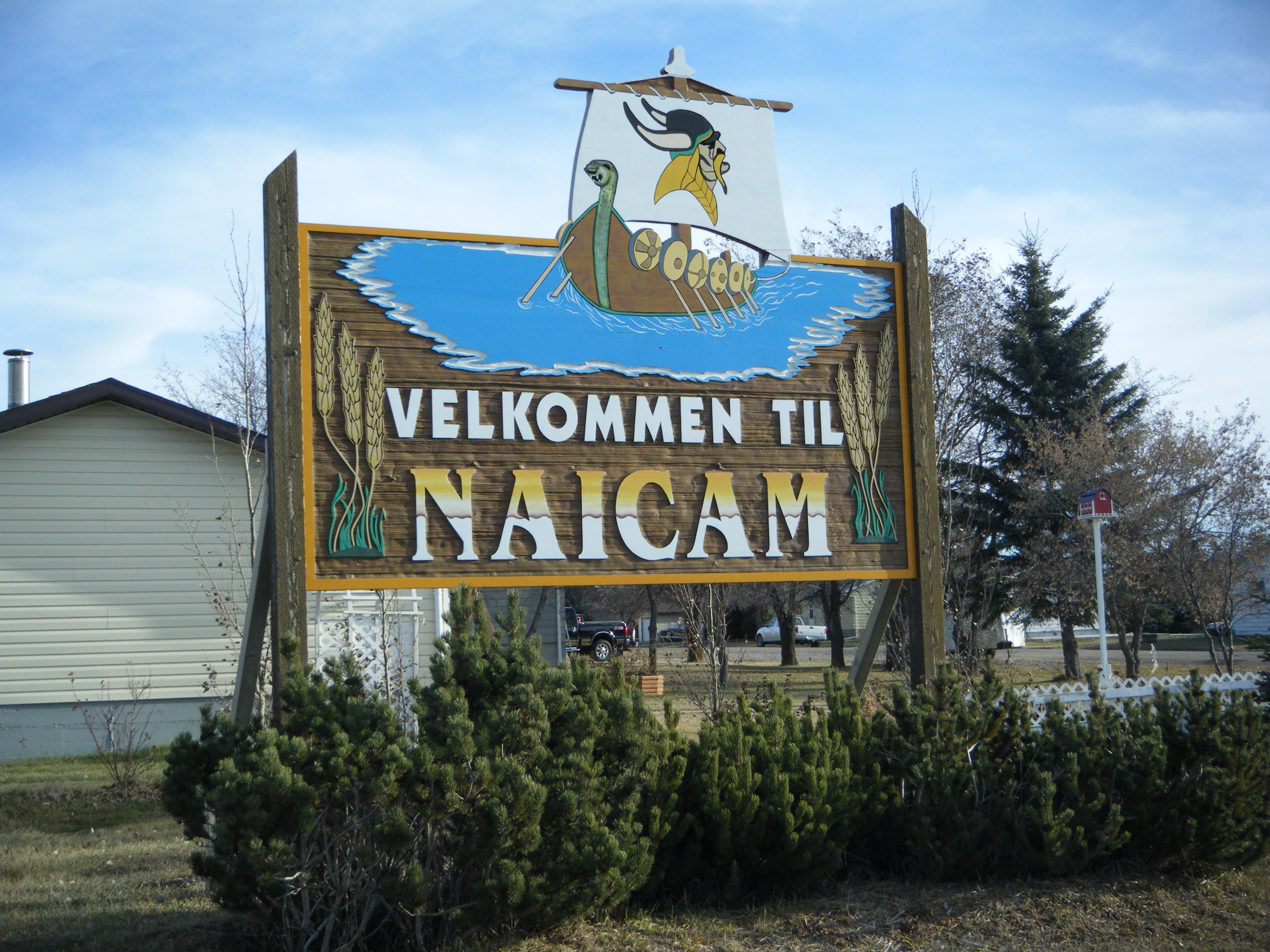

- Location of Naicam in Saskatchewan Town of Naicam (Canada)
- Coordinates: 52°25′10″N 104°29′48″W
- Country: Canada
- Province: Saskatchewan
- Federal Electoral District: Saskatoon-Humboldt
- Census division: 14
- Provincial Electoral District: Melfort
- Rural municipality: Pleasantdale No. 398

Government
  - Mayor: Rodger Hayward
  - Administrator: Janelle Scott
  - MP: Brad Trost
  - MLA: Rod Gantefoer

Area
  - Total: 1.69 km^{2} (0.65 sq mi)

Population (2006)
  - Total: 690
  - Density: 407.9/km^{2} (1,056/sq mi)
- Time zone: CST
- Postal code: S0K 2Z0
- Area code: 306
- Highways: Highway 6 / Highway 349 / Highway 777
- Website: Town of Naicam

Naicam is a town in rural Saskatchewan, Canada, about 224 kilometres (139 mi) north of the province's capital city, Regina. In 2006 the population was 690. The name of the town is a combination of Naismith and Cameron, the railway construction contractors.

== History ==
Hans Alpha, an immigrant from Norway is considered to be one of the area's earliest settlers who were mostly of Scandinavian ancestry. He's credited with building the first homestead at the current site of the town in 1904. Alpha sold his property in 1909 to Ingeborg Knutson, a woman who later sold the land to the Canadian Pacific Railway for a townsite.

The community was named after a combination of Peter Lawrence Naismith and Allan Cameron's surnames, two railway officials.

Naicam was incorporated as a village in 1921 and became a town in 1954.

== Utilities ==
Naicam receives several radio stations from both Saskatoon and Regina. The local cable television company for the Naicam area is Image Cable. SaskTel provides cellular service to the area.

== Education ==
Naicam has a Kindergarten to grade 12 school that also serves other communities in the area such as Pleasantdale, Spalding, and Saint Front.

== Sports ==
Viking Sportsplex is the hub of Naicam's recreational activity, with an ice arena playing home to all ages of hockey ranging from junior novice to senior. Following the arena's name, all of the hockey teams in the town are called the "Naicam Vikings". The facility also houses a three sheet curling rink, and a virtual golf simulator.

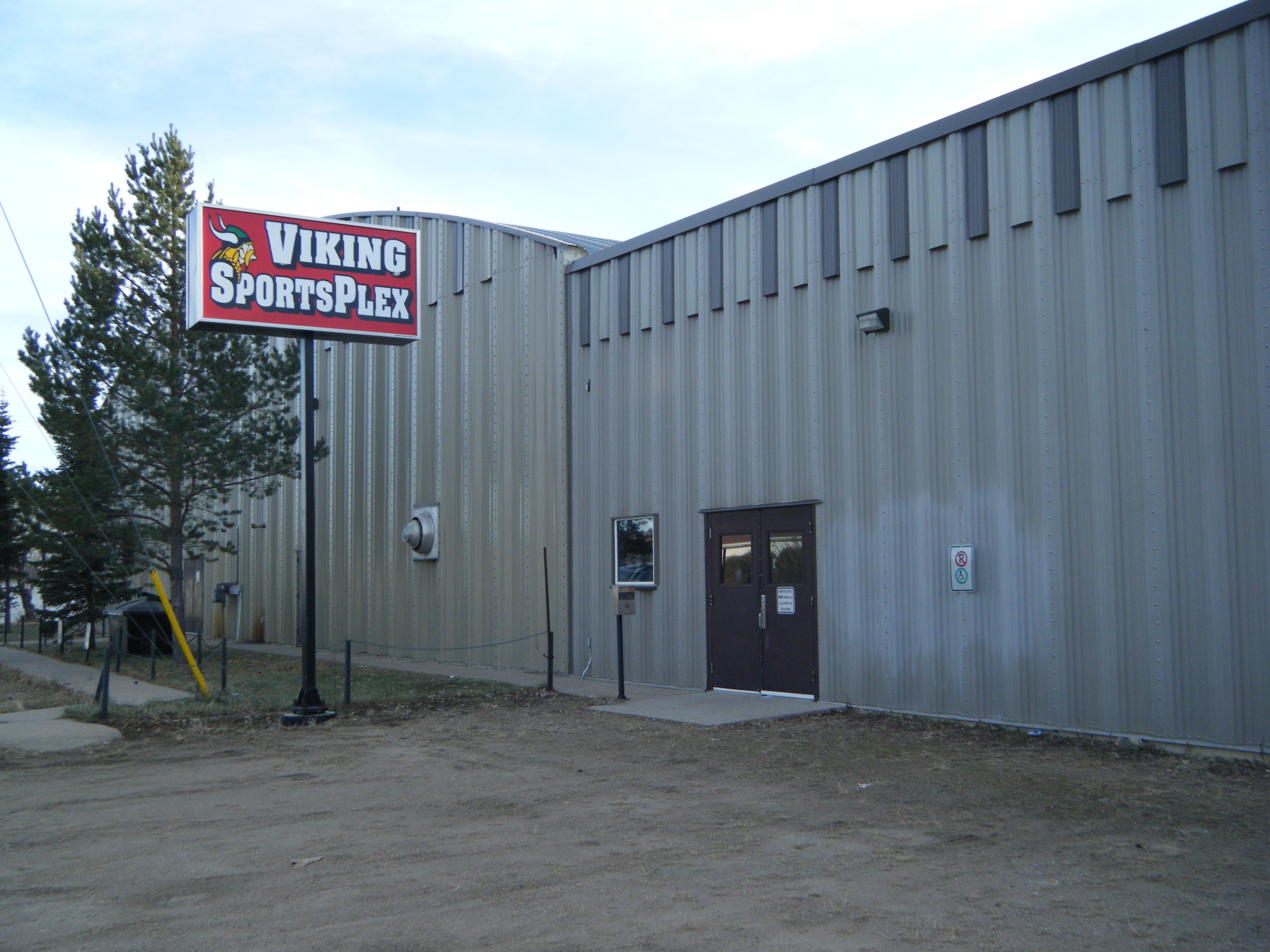
Viking SportsPlex

== Demographics ==
In the 2021 Census of Population conducted by Statistics Canada, Naicam had a population of 651 living in 311 of its 342 total private dwellings, a change of −1.5% from its 2016 population of 661. With a land area of 1.56 km^{2} (0.60 sq mi), it had a population density of 417.3/km^{2} (1,080.8/sq mi) in 2021.

== Attractions ==
The Pioneer School (c. 1923–1928) is a Municipal Heritage Property on the Canadian Register of Historic Places.

== Businesses ==
There are several local businesses in Naicam, including grocery stores, hardware / lumber, hair and esthetics, restaurants, bakery, hotel and motel, insurance agencies, pharmacy, automotive repair and dealership, and construction and contractors.

== See also ==
- List of towns in Saskatchewan
- List of francophone communities in Saskatchewan
