= Chris Beaudry =

Canadian politician

The Honourable Chris Beaudry ECS MLA

Member of the Saskatchewan Legislative Assembly for Kelvington-Wadena
- Incumbent
- Assumed office October 1, 2024
- Preceded by: Hugh Nerlien

Personal details
- Party: Saskatchewan Party

Chris Beaudry is a Canadian politician who was elected to the Legislative Assembly of Saskatchewan in the 2024 general election, representing Kelvington-Wadena as a member of the Saskatchewan Party.

Prior to his political career, Beaudry was on the coaching staff of the Humboldt Broncos until the 2018 crash that killed 10 players and six staff.

== Political career ==
On December 11, 2025, Beaudry replaced Colleen Young as Saskatchewan’s Minister of Energy and Resources.
