= Greenwater Lake Provincial Park =

Provincial park in Saskatchewan, Canada

- IUCN category II (national park)
- Location within Saskatchewan Location within Canada
- Interactive map of Greenwater Lake Provincial Park
- Location: Saskatchewan, Canada
- Nearest city: Porcupine Plain
- Coordinates: 52°31′55″N 103°30′19″W
- Area: 20,720 ha (51,200 acres)
- Established: 1932
- Governing body: Sask Parks

Greenwater Lake Provincial Park is a provincial park in the Canadian province of Saskatchewan. It is on the eastern side of the province in the Porcupine Hills on Highway 38. The town of Porcupine Plain is about 28 kilometres (17 mi) to the north-east and the town of Kelvington is 40 kilometres (25 mi) to the south. Founded on 19 February 1932, Greenwater is one of the oldest provincial parks in Saskatchewan. The original six parks were established in 1931 and Greenwater Provincial Park was added one year later. In 1964, the park was expanded to its current size.

The park is centred around two lakes, Greenwater and Marean, in the Porcupine Provincial Forest. The west side of Marean Lake is not within the park but there is a resort there called Marean Lake Valley Resort. The park is also an Important Bird Area (IBA) of Canada (Greenwater Lake Provincial Park (SK 071)).

== Attractions and amenities ==
Greenwater Provincial Park is considered an all-season destination as it offers a wide variety of amenities and attraction for both the summer and winter seasons.

Some of the amenities include a marina that offers rentals and moorage, a volleyball net, laundry, hiking, picnicking, a tennis court, a horseshoe area, an 18-hole golf course, mini-golf, a fish cleaning station, a baseball diamond, children's playgrounds, camping, cabin rentals, and a beach. There is also a hall available for events and a store with groceries, clothing, souvenirs, and an arcade.

There are about 125 kilometres (78 mi) of trails throughout the park. In the summer months, they're great for hiking, walking, and bird watching. In the winter months, the trails are groomed for cross-country skiing and snowmobiling. The winter also features ice skating and tobogganing.

Restaurants in the park include the Greenwater Beach Cafe and an indoor restaurant called Greenwater Fisherman's Cove.

Fuels such as diesel, gasoline, propane, marine fuel, and firewood are available in the park.

=== Camping and cabins ===
Greenwater Provincial Park has over 300 individual campsites divided into five campgrounds, including Aspen Grove, Poplar Ridge, Hilltop, Cranberry, and Lakeshore Campgrounds. As the name suggests, Lakeshore Campground is right on Greenwater Lake. Hilltop is the largest with 87 sites and Aspen is the smallest with 12. The campgrounds all have access to fire pits, picnic tables, potable water, waste disposal, showers, and flush toilets.

The park also has 28 cabins for rent, 18 of which are winterised.

=== Green Hills Golf Resort ===
Green Hills Golf Resort is an 18-hole golf course in Greenwater Lake Provincial Park. It is a championship par 72 course with a total length of 6,717 yards. It features silica sand traps, water hazards in play, and manicured fairways with hilltop views. Rating from blue tees 72.9, slope 128.

=== Greenwater Lake Marina ===
On the south shore of the lake is Greenwater Lake Marina. The marina offers moorage and marine gas as well as pontoon boat, fishing boat, canoe, kayak, and paddle boat rentals. At the store at the marina, there's fishing gear, such as rods and nets for sale or rent as well as various bait, including leeches, nightcrawlers, and frozen minnows. Safety equipment, such as life jackets, is available as well.

=== Summer and winter trails ===
During the spring, summer, and autumn, the 125 kilometres (78 mi) of trails are open for hiking and exploring. There are two interpretive trails, Marean Lake Birding and Highbush, that are ideal for birdwatching as the park is home to more than 200 bird species, some of which include the trumpeter swan, bald eagle, common yellowthroat, yellow-bellied sapsucker, osprey, and the red-breasted merganser. Both trails include look out points, including a 5.5-metre high lookout tower on Marean Lake, rest areas, and interpretive signs.

In the winter, 25 kilometres (16 mi) of trails are groomed for cross-country skiing and 100 kilometres (62 mi) for snowmobiling. There are several warm-up shelters along the trails.

=== Sask Aquatic Adventures ===
At the beach, Sask Aquatic Adventures has a water adventure park set up. It is one of several in Saskatchewan.

== Flora and fauna ==
The park is situated in the Porcupine Provincial Forest in east central Saskatchewan. The landscape is made up of rolling hills dotted with small lakes and covered with spruce, balsam poplar, and aspen trees. It is home to over 200 species of birds and a variety of wildlife including foxes, otters, coyotes, moose, black bears, and elk. Fish such as northern pike, walleye, and yellow perch inhabit the lakes.

== See also ==
- List of protected areas of Saskatchewan
- Tourism in Saskatchewan
