= Chelan, Saskatchewan =

Hamlet in Saskatchewan, Canada

Coordinates: 52°36′44″N 103°23′26″W

Chelan is a hamlet in the Canadian province of Saskatchewan.

== Geography ==
The community is on the north side of Highway 23, at the intersection of Highway 38 and Highway 773. Red Deer River is about 4 kilometres (2.5 mi) to the west and Greenwater Creek runs along the eastern edge of town.

== Demographics ==
In the 2021 Census of Population conducted by Statistics Canada, Chelan had a population of 45 living in 22 of its 34 total private dwellings, a change of -18.2% from its 2016 population of 55. With a land area of 0.2 km^{2} (0.077 sq mi), it had a population density of 225.0/km^{2} (582.7/sq mi) in 2021.

== See also ==
- List of hamlets in Saskatchewan
- List of communities in Saskatchewan
