= Saint-Front, Saskatchewan =

Community in Saskatchewan, Canada

Coordinates: 52°22′00″N 104°10′02″W

Location of Saint-Front in Saskatchewan

Saint-Front is a hamlet in Saskatchewan. It is known as a regional centre for curling.

It is about 50 kilometres (31 mi) from St. Brieux and was settled by French and Belgian peoples in 1910. It was named for the second century saint, Saint Frontus.

== See also ==
- List of communities in Saskatchewan
