= Rural Municipality of Barrier Valley No. 397 =

Rural municipality in Saskatchewan, Canada

Barrier Valley No. 397
- Rural municipality
- Rural Municipality of Barrier Valley No. 397
- Location of the RM of Barrier Valley No. 397 in Saskatchewan
- Coordinates: 52.530°N 103.950°W
- Country: Canada
- Province: Saskatchewan
- Census division: 14
- SARM division: 4
- Federal riding: Yorkton—Melville
- Provincial riding: Kelvington-Wadena
- Formed: October 29, 1917

Government
  - Reeve: Wayne Black
  - Governing body: RM of Barrier Valley No. 397 Council
  - Administrator: Glenda Smith
  - Office location: Archerwill

Area (2021)
  - Land: 817.93 km^{2} (315.80 sq mi)

Population (2021)
  - Total: 485
  - Density: 0.6/km^{2} (1.6/sq mi)
- Time zone: CST
  - Summer (DST): CST
- Area codes: 306 / 639 / 474
- Highway(s): Highway 35; Highway 349 Highway 773
- Railway(s): Canadian Pacific Railway
- Waterway(s): Barrier River, George Williams Lake, Carps Lake

The Rural Municipality of Barrier Valley No. 397 (2021 population: 485) is a rural municipality (RM) in the Canadian province of Saskatchewan within Census Division No. 14 and SARM Division No. 4. It is located in the east-central portion of the province.

== History ==
The RM of Barrier Valley No. 397 incorporated as a rural municipality on October 29, 1917. In 1924, the RM named a new Canadian Pacific Railway siding "Archerwill" using a syllabic abbreviation of councillors Archie Campbell and Ervie Hanson, and secretary-treasurer William Pierce.

== Geography ==
=== Communities and localities ===
The following urban municipalities are surrounded by the RM.

Villages

- Archerwill

The following unincorporated communities are within the RM.

Localities

- Algrove
- Dahlton
- Lightwoods
- McKague
- Wallwort

== Demographics ==
Population history (1981–2021)
Year	Pop.	±%
1981	777	—
1986	775	−0.3%
1991	702	−9.4%
1996	615	−12.4%
2001	630	+2.4%
2006	576	−8.6%
2011	498	−13.5%
2016	431	−13.5%
2021	485	+12.5%
Source: Statistics Canada via Saskatchewan Bureau of Statistics

In the 2021 Census of Population conducted by Statistics Canada, the RM of Barrier Valley No. 397 had a population of 485 living in 216 of its 375 total private dwellings, a change of 12.5% from its 2016 population of 431. With a land area of 817.93 km^{2} (315.80 sq mi), it had a population density of 0.6/km^{2} (1.5/sq mi) in 2021.

In the 2016 Census of Population, the RM of Barrier Valley No. 397 recorded a population of 431 living in 182 of its 308 total private dwellings, a −13.5% change from its 2011 population of 498. With a land area of 819.99 km^{2} (316.60 sq mi), it had a population density of 0.5/km^{2} (1.4/sq mi) in 2016.

== Government ==
The RM of Barrier Valley No. 397 is governed by an elected municipal council and an appointed administrator that meets on the second Thursday of every month. The reeve of the RM is Wayne Black while its administrator is Glenda Smith. The RM's office is located in Archerwill. Until 1981, the RM's office was located in McKague.

== Transportation ==
Rail

- Wadena-to-Tisdale branch line, Canadian Pacific Railway

Roads

- Highway 35—serves Archerwill, McKague, Wallwort
- Highway 349—serves Archerwill, Dahlton
- Highway 652—serves Archerwill
- Highway 773—serves McKague

== See also ==
- List of communities in Saskatchewan
- List of rural municipalities in Saskatchewan
