= Ponass Lakes =

Lake in Saskatchewan, Canada

- Location in Saskatchewan Ponass Lakes (Canada)
- Location: RM of Ponass Lake No. 367, Saskatchewan
- Coordinates: 52.2667°N 103.9672°W
- Part of: Nelson River drainage basin
- Basin countries: Canada
- Max. length: 15 km (9.3 mi)
- Max. width: 10 km (6.2 mi)
- Surface area: 2,995 ha (7,400 acres)
- Shore length^{1}: 162 km (101 mi)
- Surface elevation: 549 m (1,801 ft)
- Settlements: None
- ^{1} Shore length is not a well-defined measure.

Ponass Lakes consist of six shallow, marshy lake basins ranging in size from 98 ha (240 acres) to 1,631 ha (4,030 acres) in the central part of the Canadian province of Saskatchewan. The lakes and marsh are located within the Aspen Parkland ecoregion and are surrounded by groves of trembling aspen and farmland. The water levels are controlled by a series of dams operated by Ducks Unlimited Canada. The outflow for the lakes and marsh flows through a short creek at the north end. The creek flows into George Williams Lake, which is within the Red Deer River drainage basin. The lakes and marsh are in the RM of Ponass Lake No. 367 north-west of the town of Kelvington. Access is from Highway 35.

Ponass Lakes and the surrounding marsh are nationally important for migratory birds and are within an Important Bird Area (IBA) of Canada. The Ponass Marsh was the first designated Heritage Marsh in Saskatchewan.

== Ponass Lake Heritage Marsh and IBA ==
Ponas Lake Heritage Marsh was established in 1981 and encompasses the marsh and lakes, covering an area of about 2,995 hectares (7,400 acres). The wetland and part of the surrounding upland are also part of the Ponass Lake (SK 072) Important Bird Area of Canada. The IBA covers an area of 289.04 km^{2} (111.60 sq mi) and birds found there include ducks, Canada geese, sandhill cranes, snow geese, whooping cranes, peregrine falcons, American coots, black-crowned night-herons, American bitterns, soras, American white pelicans, black terns, common terns, pied-billed grebes, red-necked grebes, great blue herons, Franklin's gulls, and greater white-fronted geese.

== See also ==
- List of lakes of Saskatchewan
- List of protected areas of Saskatchewan
