= Kelvington-Wadena =

Provincial electoral district in Saskatchewan, Canada

Coordinates: 52°10′N 103°40′W

Saskatchewan electoral district

Provincial electoral district
- Legislature: Legislative Assembly of Saskatchewan
MLA
Chris Beaudry
Saskatchewan
- District created: 1975
- First contested: 1975
- Last contested: 2024

Demographics
- Electors: 9,509
- Census division(s): Division 10, 14

Kelvington-Wadena is a provincial electoral district for the Legislative Assembly of Saskatchewan, Canada, in the east-central region. The riding was last contested in the 2020 general election, when it returned Saskatchewan Party MLA Hugh Nerlien.

The largest population centres in the constituency are Wynyard, Wadena, Foam Lake, Kelvington and Porcupine Plain. Villages in the riding include Bjorkdale, Elfros, Rama, Archerwill, Margo and Lintlaw. Both major Canadian railways — the Canadian National and the Canadian Pacific — have branch lines serving the area.

== History ==
Kelvington-Wadena was created in 1975 by merging the ridings of Kelvington and Wadena. However, the riding has been significantly reconfigured several times since then. For the 1995 general election, the riding was significantly expanded east and west, taking in territory from Canora and Quill Lakes which were being merged and eliminated, respectively. The next major reconfiguration came prior to the 2003 general election, at which time the riding exchanged significant territory between Canora-Pelly, Last Mountain-Touchwood, Melfort and Carrot River Valley. For the next general election, the riding will gain territory west and south of Wynyard from Arm River and lose territory around Invermay and Tisdale to Canora-Pelly and Carrot River Valley, respectively.

From its creation until 1999, the riding returned MLAs from all three major parties. It originally alternated between the New Democrats and Progressive Conservatives, before being won by Liberal MLA June Draude with a thin plurality. Draude joined the Saskatchewan Party upon its founding in 1997, and the riding has been held by Saskatchewan Party MLAs since.

== Members of the Legislative Assembly ==
This riding has elected the following members of the Legislative Assembly:

Legislature	Years	Member	Party
Kelvington-Wadena; Riding created from Wadena and Kelvington
18th	1975–1978	Neil Erland Byers	New Democratic
19th	1978–1982	Neil Erland Byers	New Democratic
20th	1982–1986	Sherwin Petersen	Progressive Conservative
21st	1986–1991	Sherwin Petersen	Progressive Conservative
22nd	1991–1995	Kenneth Kluz	New Democratic
23rd	1995–1997	June Draude	Liberal
23rd	1997–1999	June Draude	Saskatchewan
24th	1999–2003	June Draude	Saskatchewan
25th	2003–2007	June Draude	Saskatchewan
26th	2007–2011	June Draude	Saskatchewan
27th	2011–2016	June Draude	Saskatchewan
28th	2016–2020	Hugh Nerlien	Saskatchewan
29th	2020–2024	Hugh Nerlien	Saskatchewan
30th	2024–present	Chris Beaudry	Saskatchewan

== Election results ==
=== 2024 ===
2024 Saskatchewan general election
Party	Candidate	Votes	%	±%
Saskatchewan	Chris Beaudry	5,015	65.07	-5.63
New Democratic	Lorne Schroeder	1,736	22.52	+4.62
Saskatchewan United	Clint Gottinger	831	10.78	–
Green	Gillian Halyk	125	1.62	-0.78
Total valid votes		7,707	99.55	
Total rejected ballots		35	0.45	
Turnout		7,742	60.94	
Eligible voters		12,704		
Saskatchewan hold		Swing		
Source: Elections Saskatchewan

=== 2020 ===
2020 provincial election redistributed results
Party	%
Saskatchewan	70.7
New Democratic	17.9
Buffalo	5.3
Green	2.4

2020 Saskatchewan general election
Party	Candidate	Votes	%	±%
Saskatchewan	Hugh Nerlien	4,791	69.57	-0.40
New Democratic	Linda Patenaude	1,223	17.76	-0.69
Buffalo	Justin Chrobot	370	5.37	–
Progressive Conservative	Wayne Mastrachuk	331	4.80	-0.51
Green	Melissa Fletcher	172	2.50	+1.03
Total valid votes		6,887	99.57	
Total rejected ballots		30	0.43	–
Turnout		6,917	–	–
Eligible voters		–		
Saskatchewan hold		Swing		–
Source: Elections Saskatchewan

=== 2016 ===
2016 Saskatchewan general election
Party	Candidate	Votes	%	±%
Saskatchewan	Hugh Nerlien	5,133	69.97	–8.75
New Democratic	Danny Hiscock	1,354	18.45	+0.09
Progressive Conservative	Tim Atchinson	390	5.31	-
Western Independence	Walter Hrappsted	218	2.97	-
Liberal	Bernie Yuzdepski	132	1.79	-
Green	Owen Swiderski	108	1.47	–1.45
Total valid votes		7,335	100.0	
Eligible voters		–		
Saskatchewan hold		Swing		-
Source: Elections Saskatchewan

=== 2011 ===
2011 Saskatchewan general election
Party	Candidate	Votes	%	±%
Saskatchewan	June Draude	5,091	78.72	+8.55
New Democratic	Graham Reid	1,187	18.36	–4.72
Green	Elaine Hughes	189	2.92	+1.10
Total valid votes		6,467	100.0	
Saskatchewan hold		Swing		+6.64

=== 2007 ===
2007 Saskatchewan general election
Party	Candidate	Votes	%	±%
Saskatchewan	June Draude	5,330	70.17	+12.51
New Democratic	Mervin Kryzanowski	1,753	23.08	–8.35
Liberal	Don Gabel	294	3.87	–3.05
Green	Elaine Hughes	138	1.82	–
Western Independence	John Koban	81	1.06	–2.93
Total valid votes		7,596	100.0	
Saskatchewan hold		Swing		+10.28

=== 2003 ===
2003 Saskatchewan general election
Party	Candidate	Votes	%	±%
Saskatchewan	June Draude	4,515	57.66	–7.99
New Democratic	Ryan Calder	2,461	31.43	+3.43
Liberal	Harry Kerr	542	6.92	+0.57
Western Independence	Neil Fenske	312	3.99	–
Total valid votes		7,830	100.0	
Saskatchewan hold		Swing		–5.56

=== 1999 ===
1999 Saskatchewan general election
Party	Candidate	Votes	%	±%
Saskatchewan	June Draude	5,045	65.65	–
New Democratic	Doug Still	2,152	28.00	–13.67
Liberal	Sean Macknak	488	6.35	–36.86
Total valid votes		7,685	100.0	
Saskatchewan gain from Liberal		Swing		+39.66

=== 1995 ===
1995 Saskatchewan general election
Party	Candidate	Votes	%	±%
Liberal	June Draude	3,294	43.21	+33.18
New Democratic	Darrel Cunningham	3,177	41.67	–12.67
Progressive Conservative	Dwayne Evans	1,153	15.12	–20.51
Total valid votes		7,624	100.0	
Liberal gain from New Democratic		Swing		+22.92

=== 1991 ===
1991 Saskatchewan general election
Party	Candidate	Votes	%	±%
New Democratic	Kenneth Kluz	3,956	54.34	+10.33
Progressive Conservative	Sherwin Petersen	2,594	35.63	–15.34
Liberal	Bill Kerluke	730	10.03	+5.01
Total valid votes		7,280	100.0	
New Democratic gain from Progressive Conservative		Swing		+12.84

=== 1986 ===
1986 Saskatchewan general election
Party	Candidate	Votes	%	±%
Progressive Conservative	Sherwin Petersen	4,129	50.97	–1.20
New Democratic	Ken Folstad	3,565	44.01	–1.23
Liberal	Orvall Enge	407	5.02	+2.43
Total valid votes		8,101	100.0	
Progressive Conservative hold		Swing		+0.02

=== 1982 ===
1982 Saskatchewan general election
Party	Candidate	Votes	%	±%
Progressive Conservative	Sherwin Petersen	4,330	52.17	+10.37
New Democratic	Neil Erland Byers	3,755	45.24	–6.49
Liberal	Ben Ferrie	215	2.59	–3.88
Total valid votes		8,300	100.0	
Progressive Conservative gain from New Democratic		Swing		+8.43

=== 1978 ===
1978 Saskatchewan general election
Party	Candidate	Votes	%	±%
New Democratic	Neil Erland Byers	4,165	51.73	+1.14
Progressive Conservative	Ray Meiklejohn	3,366	41.80	+15.44
Liberal	Ben Ferrie	521	6.47	–16.58
Total valid votes		8,052	100.0	
New Democratic hold		Swing		–7.15

=== 1975 ===
1975 Saskatchewan general election
Party	Candidate	Votes	%
New Democratic	Neil Erland Byers	4,051	50.59
Progressive Conservative	Don Austring	2,111	26.36
Liberal	Joe Bencharski	1,846	23.05
Total valid votes		8,008	100.0
New Democratic pickup new district.			

== See also ==
- List of Saskatchewan provincial electoral districts
- List of Saskatchewan general elections
- Canadian provincial electoral districts
