= Nobleville =

Town in Saskatchewan, Canada

Coordinates: 52°26′00″N 103°37′02″W

Nobleville is a town in Saskatchewan, Canada.

Nobleville was a very small town in the 1950s. It had a store, a post office, and a church. The church was rebuilt in the 1980s. Present day, Nobleville is now a small community of neighbours who attend the Roman Catholic Church.
