= Kelvington, Saskatchewan =

Town in Saskatchewan, Canada

Kelvington
- Town
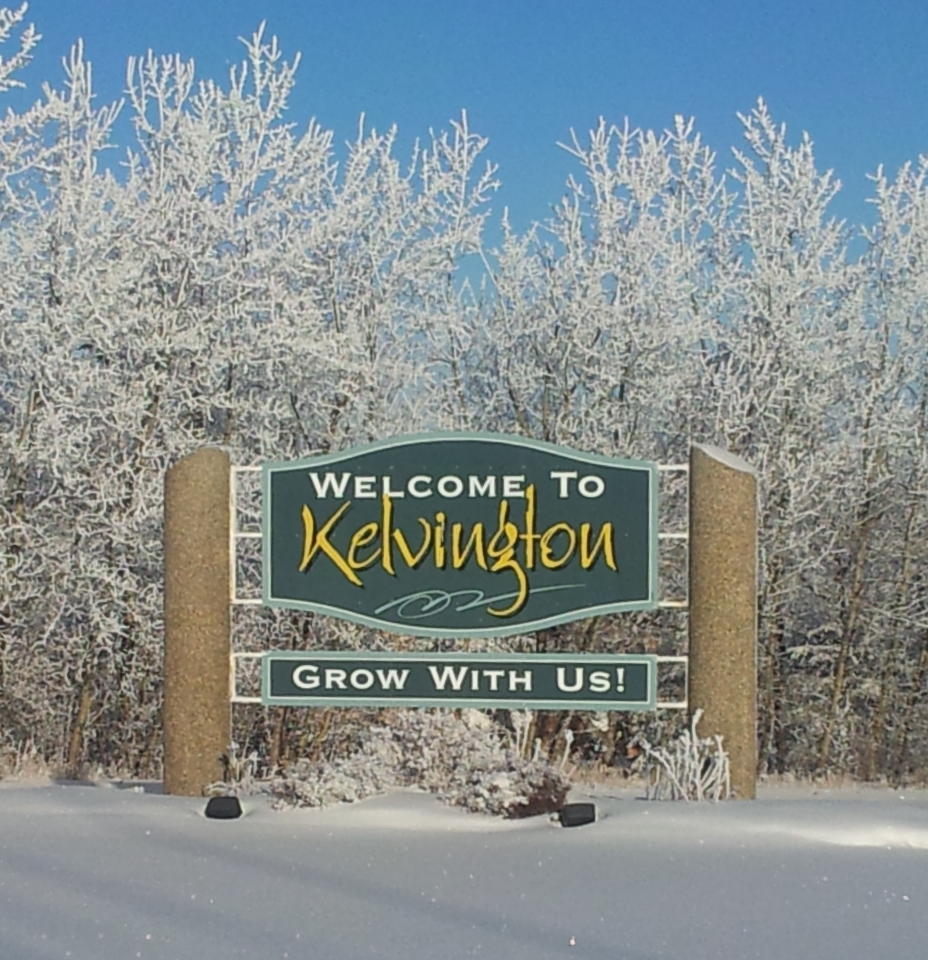
- Motto: Grow With Us
- Location of Kelvington in Saskatchewan Kelvington (Canada)
- Coordinates: 52°10′N 103°32′W
- Country: Canada
- Province: Saskatchewan
- Rural Municipalities (R.M.): Kelvington
- Post office Founded: 1906-09-01

Government
  - Federal Electoral District of Yorkton—Melville M.P.: Cathay Wagantall (2015)
  - Provincial Constituency of Kelvington-Wadena M.L.A.: Hugh Nerlien (2016)

Area
  - Total: 3.89 km^{2} (1.50 sq mi)

Population (2022)
  - Total: 864
  - Density: 221.9/km^{2} (575/sq mi)
- Time zone: UTC−6 (Central Standard Time)
- Postal code: S0A 1W0
- Area code: 306
- Highways: Hwy 38, Hwy 49
- Website: Official website

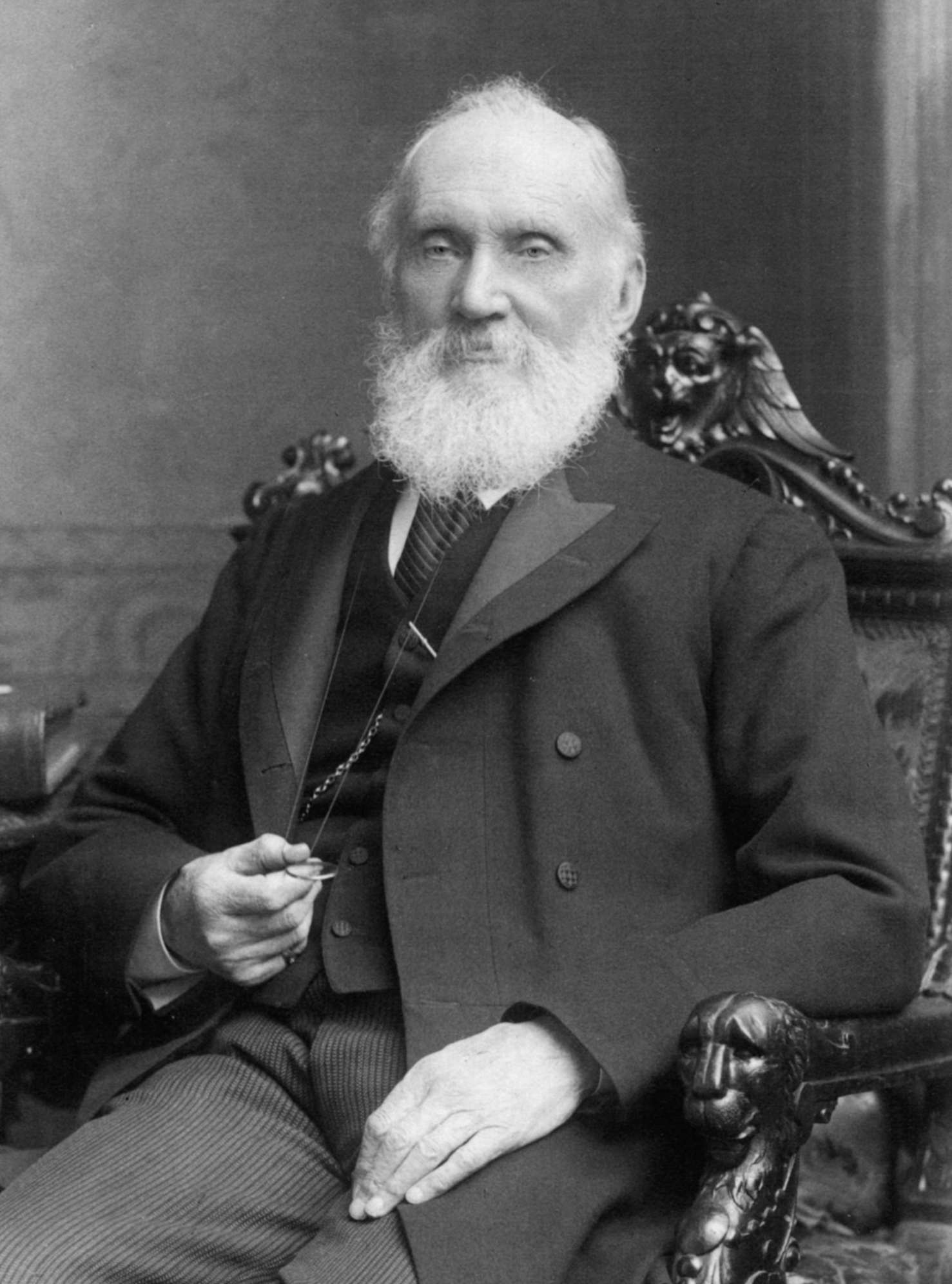
Photograph of William Thomson, Lord Kelvin

Kelvington is a town of 864 residents in the Rural Municipality of Kelvington No. 366, in the Canadian province of Saskatchewan. Kelvington is at the intersection of Highway 38 and Highway 49. It is east of Saskatoon.

The town was named for William Thomson, 1st Baron Kelvin, scientist and inventor.

== Geography ==
Kelvington is geographically situated in the parkland region of Saskatchewan and is surrounded by numerous lakes: Big and Little Quill Lakes, Ponass Lakes, Nut Lake, Little Nut Lake, Round Lake, and Fishing Lake going around clockwise. Kelvington is 237 kilometres (147 mi) east from the nearest major city of Saskatoon.

== Demographics ==
In the 2021 Census of Population conducted by Statistics Canada, Kelvington had a population of 827 living in 406 of its 469 total private dwellings, a change of −0.8% from its 2016 population of 834. With a land area of 3.87 km^{2} (1.49 sq mi), it had a population density of 213.7/km^{2} (553.5/sq mi) in 2021.

Canada census – Kelvington community profile

	2021	2011
Population	827 (-0.8% from 2016)	864 (-0.2% from 2006)
Land area	3.87 km^{2} (1.49 sq mi)	3.89 km^{2} (1.50 sq mi)
Population density	213.8/km^{2} (554/sq mi)	221.9/km^{2} (575/sq mi)
Median age	54.8 (M: 54.0, F: 56.0)	54.9 (M: 51.9, F: 56.5)
Private dwellings	469 (total) 406 (occupied)	464 (total)
Median household income	$58,000

References: 2021 2011

== Attractions ==
The following are attractions near Kelvington:

- Round Lake Recreation Site
- Marean Lake is 40 km (25 mi) north of Kelvington.
- Fishing Lake Regional Park is located 35 km (22 mi) south of Kelvington.
- Greenwater Lake Provincial Park is located 40 km (25 mi) north of Kelvington.

== Infrastructure ==
=== Transportation ===
Besides being at the intersection of a secondary grade and primary grade, Highway 38 and Highway 49, Kelvington is also home to the Kelvington Airport CKV2 which has a 2500-foot turf runway with no winter maintenance. Kelvington is also located along the CPR railway. and the Route 66 Snowmobile Trail.

=== Health care ===
The Kelvington and Area Hospital opened in June 2016. It replaces the aging facility opened in 1969. The hospital is an integrated facility containing seven acute care beds, medical clinic, 24 hour emergency services, home care offices, lab, and diagnostic imaging services. It also hosts several itinerant specialists including occupational therapy, public health, physio therapy and more. A 45-bed integrated long term care facility was opened in early 2017.

Ambulance services are located within the community and includes three ambulances with Advanced Care Paramedics.

East Central Saskatchewan Association for the Rehabilitation of the Brain Injured (SARBI) is a rehabilitation facility which is located in Kelvington and services a one hundred mile radius. This facility provides services and therapy for individuals who have experienced a brain injury from trauma or illness.

== Media ==
Kelvington is serviced by the Northeast Chronicle and Wadena News. The nearest radio station is located in Humboldt, Saskatchewan - CHBO-FM 107.5

== Notable people ==
- Barry Melrose, ice hockey player in the NHL and WHA and coach in the NHL
- Joe Kocur, ice hockey player in the NHL
- Wendel Clark, ice hockey player in the NHL
- Kerry Clark, ice hockey player
- Kory Kocur, ice hockey player
