= Rural Municipality of Kelvington No. 366 =

Rural municipality in Saskatchewan, Canada

Kelvington No. 366
- Rural municipality
- Rural Municipality of Kelvington No. 366
- Location of the RM of Kelvington No. 366 in Saskatchewan
- Coordinates: 52.334°N 103.626°W
- Country: Canada
- Province: Saskatchewan
- Census division: 14
- SARM division: 4
- Formed: January 1, 1913

Government
  - Reeve: Maurice Patenaude
  - Governing body: RM of Kelvington No. 366 Council
  - Administrator: Heather Elmy
  - Office location: Kelvington

Area (2016)
  - Land: 862.24 km^{2} (332.91 sq mi)

Population (2016)
  - Total: 398
  - Density: 0.5/km^{2} (1.3/sq mi)
- Time zone: CST
  - Summer (DST): CST
- Area codes: 306 and 639

The Rural Municipality of Kelvington No. 366 (2016 population: 398) is a rural municipality (RM) in the Canadian province of Saskatchewan within Census Division No. 14 and SARM Division No. 4. It is located in the southeast portion of the province.

== History ==
The RM of Kelvington No. 366 incorporated as a rural municipality on January 1, 1913.

== Geography ==
=== Communities and localities ===
The following urban municipalities are surrounded by the RM.

Villages

- Kelvington

It also surrounds the Yellow Quill 90 First Nations Indian reserve.

== Demographics ==
Population history (1981–2016)
Year	Pop.	±%
1981	940	—
1986	922	−1.9%
1991	759	−17.7%
1996	668	−12.0%
2001	617	−7.6%
2006	514	−16.7%
2011	499	−2.9%
2016	398	−20.2%
Source: Statistics Canada via Saskatchewan Bureau of Statistics

In the 2021 Census of Population conducted by Statistics Canada, the RM of Kelvington No. 366 had a population of 366 living in 168 of its 220 total private dwellings, a change of −8% from its 2016 population of 398. With a land area of 853.13 km^{2} (329.40 sq mi), it had a population density of 0.4/km^{2} (1.1/sq mi) in 2021.

In the 2016 Census of Population, the RM of Kelvington No. 366 recorded a population of 398 living in 176 of its 237 total private dwellings, a −19.4% change from its 2011 population of 494. With a land area of 862.24 km^{2} (332.91 sq mi), it had a population density of 0.5/km^{2} (1.2/sq mi) in 2016.

== Government ==
The RM of Kelvington No. 366 is governed by an elected municipal council and an appointed administrator that meets on the second Thursday of every month. The reeve of the RM is Maurice Patenaude while its administrator is Heather Elmy. The RM's office is located in Kelvington.

== Attractions ==
- Camp Saskadet – a Tri-Service Provincial Cadet Camp used by Air, Army, and Sea Cadets at Round Lake
