= Pleasantdale, Saskatchewan =

Village in Saskatchewan, Canada

Village of Pleasantdale
- Village
- Location within Saskatchewan Location within Canada
- Coordinates: 52.576°N 104.506°W
- Country: Canada
- Province: Saskatchewan
- Census division: 14
- Rural municipality: Pleasantdale No. 398
- Post office Founded: N/A
- Incorporated (Village): N/A
- Incorporated (Town): N/A

Government
  - Mayor: Kevin Schick
  - Administrator: K. Laking
  - Governing body: Pleasantdale Village Council

Area
  - Total: 0.52 km^{2} (0.20 sq mi)

Population (2011)
  - Total: 76
  - Density: 136.6/km^{2} (354/sq mi)
- Time zone: CST
- Postal code: S0K 3H0
- Area code: 306
- Highways: Highway 6
- Waterways: Lenore Lake

Pleasantdale (2016 population: 76) is a village in the Canadian province of Saskatchewan within the Rural Municipality of Pleasantdale No. 398 and Census Division No. 14.

== History ==
Pleasantdale incorporated as a village on January 1, 1987.

== Demographics ==
Population history (1991–2016)
Year	Pop.	±%
1991	105	—
1996	113	+7.6%
2001	98	−13.3%
2006	85	−13.3%
2011	76	−10.6%
2016	76	+0.0%
Source: Statistics Canada via Saskatchewan Bureau of Statistics

In the 2021 Census of Population conducted by Statistics Canada, Pleasantdale had a population of 80 living in 33 of its 36 total private dwellings, a change of 5.3% from its 2016 population of 76. With a land area of 0.53 km^{2} (0.20 sq mi), it had a population density of 150.9/km^{2} (390.9/sq mi) in 2021.

In the 2016 Census of Population, the Village of Pleasantdale recorded a population of 76 living in 37 of its 37 total private dwellings, a 0% change from its 2011 population of 76. With a land area of 0.56 km^{2} (0.22 sq mi), it had a population density of 135.7/km^{2} (351.5/sq mi) in 2016.

== See also ==
- List of communities in Saskatchewan
- List of villages in Saskatchewan
