= Porcupine Plain =

Town in Saskatchewan, Canada

- Town
- Motto: Nature's Gift
- Location of Porcupine Plain in Saskatchewan Porcupine Plain (Canada)
- Coordinates: 52.598°N 103.248°W
- Country: Canada
- Province: Saskatchewan
- Census division: 14
- Rural municipality: Porcupine No. 395
- Post office Founded: 1929-04-01
- Incorporated (Village): N/A
- Incorporated (Town): N/A

Government
  - Mayor: Nicholas Wood
  - Administrator: Twyla Salmond
  - Governing body: Porcupine Plain Town Council

Area
  - Total: 2.27 km^{2} (0.88 sq mi)

Population (2011)
  - Total: 855
  - Density: 377.2/km^{2} (977/sq mi)
- Time zone: CST
- Postal code: S0E 1H0
- Area code: 306
- Highways: Highway 23
- Railway: Canadian National Railway (abandoned)
- Website: Town of Porcupine Plain

Porcupine Plain is a town in Saskatchewan, Canada. It is accessed by Highway 23. Greenwater Lake Provincial Park is 5 kilometres (3.1 mi) southwest on Highway 38. The town is located within the Porcupine Provincial Forest. The town was originally settled by returning World War I veterans who settled in the area during the early 1920s. Quilly Willy is the town mascot used on promotional material.

== Demographics ==
In the 2021 Census of Population conducted by Statistics Canada, Porcupine Plain had a population of 817 living in 357 of its 400 total private dwellings, a change of −5.2% from its 2016 population of 862. With a land area of 2.12 km^{2} (0.82 sq mi), it had a population density of 385.4/km^{2} (998.1/sq mi) in 2021.

Canada census – Porcupine Plain community profile

	2021	2011
Population	817 (-5.2% from 2016)	855 (9.2% from 2006)
Land area	2.12 km^{2} (0.82 sq mi)	2.27 km^{2} (0.88 sq mi)
Population density	384.6/km^{2} (996/sq mi)	377.2/km^{2} (977/sq mi)
Median age	50.4 (M: 48.8, F: 51.6)	46.1 (M: 43.7, F: 48.4)
Private dwellings	360 (total)	388 (total)
Median household income

References: 2021 2011

== Notable people ==
- Kelly Chase, former NHL player
- Colette Bourgonje, paralympic athlete
- Darren Dutchyshen, TSN SportsCentre sportscaster

== See also ==
- List of communities in Saskatchewan
- List of towns in Saskatchewan
