= Saskatchewan Highway 339 =

Provincial highway in Saskatchewan, Canada

Highway 339

Route information
- Maintained by Ministry of Highways and Infrastructure
- Length: 49.4 km (30.7 mi)

Major junctions
- South end: Highway 334 at Avonlea
- North end: Highway 39 / Highway 642 near Drinkwater

Location
- Country: Canada
- Province: Saskatchewan
- Rural municipalities: Elmsthorpe No. 100, Redburn No. 130, Pense No. 160

Highway system
- Provincial highways in Saskatchewan
← Highway 335	→ Highway 340

Highway 339 is a provincial highway in the Canadian province of Saskatchewan. It runs from Highway 334 at Avonlea west to Highway 39, about 10 kilometres (6.2 mi) north-west of Drinkwater. The highway passes near Claybank, the Avonlea Badlands, The Dirt Hills, and Briercrest. It connects with Highways 715 and 716 and is about 49 kilometres (30 mi) long.

== Route description ==
Hwy 339 begins in the Rural Municipality of Elmsthorpe No. 100 at an intersection with Hwy 334 in the village of Avonlea, heading west through neighbourhoods along the north side of town to leave the village as it crosses a railway line (Southern Rails Cooperative) and has an intersection with Hwy 713 (St. Mary's Road). Straddling the northern edge of The Dirt Hills, the highway goes through a switchback as it crosses several small streams and a former railway line to begin following the southern boundary of the Rural Municipality of Redburn No. 130 past the Claybank Brick Plant National Historic Site (accessed via Range Road 2243) and through the hamlet of Claybank. Curving due northward at an intersection with Hwy 715, Hwy 339 fully enters the RM of Redburn and travels through rural farmland for the next several kilometres, passing an access road to Hearne (Township Road 134) on way to travel through the village of Briercrest, where it has an intersection with Hwy 716 (Railway Avenue) and crosses a railway (SORA). Continuing on through rural areas, the highway crosses the Moose Jaw River and enters the Rural Municipality of Pense No. 160, where it crosses over a railway line (Canadian Pacific Weyburn subdivision) immediately before coming to an end at a junction with Hwy 39, located halfway between the hamlet of Pasqua and the village of Drinkwater, with the road continuing north as Hwy 642. The entire length of Hwy 339 is a paved, two-lane highway.

== Major intersections ==
From south to north:

Rural municipality	Location	km	mi	Destinations	Notes
Elmsthorpe No. 100	Avonlea	0.0	0.0	Highway 334 – Kayville, Corinne	Southern terminus; continues Highway 334 east
Elmsthorpe No. 100		4.9	3.0	Highway 713 south (St. Mary's Road)	
Elmsthorpe No. 100– Redburn No. 130 boundary		14.3	8.9	Range Road 2243 – Claybank Brick Plant National Historic Site	
Elmsthorpe No. 100– Redburn No. 130 boundary	Claybank	16.0	9.9		
Elmsthorpe No. 100– Redburn No. 130 boundary		17.4	10.8	Township Road 130 – Spring Valley	Former Highway 715
Redburn No. 130		23.9	14.9	Township Road 134 – Hearne	
Redburn No. 130	Briercrest	30.6	19.0	Highway 716 west (Railway Avenue)	
Redburn No. 130		43.4– 43.5	27.0– 27.0	Bridge over the Moose Jaw River	
Pense No. 160		49.4	30.7	Highway 39 – Moose Jaw, Weyburn Highway 642 north – Belle Plaine	Northern terminus; continues as Highway 642
1.000 mi = 1.609 km; 1.000 km = 0.621 mi

== See also ==
- Transportation in Saskatchewan
- Roads in Saskatchewan
