= Saskatchewan Highway 334 =

Provincial highway in Saskatchewan, Canada

Highway 334

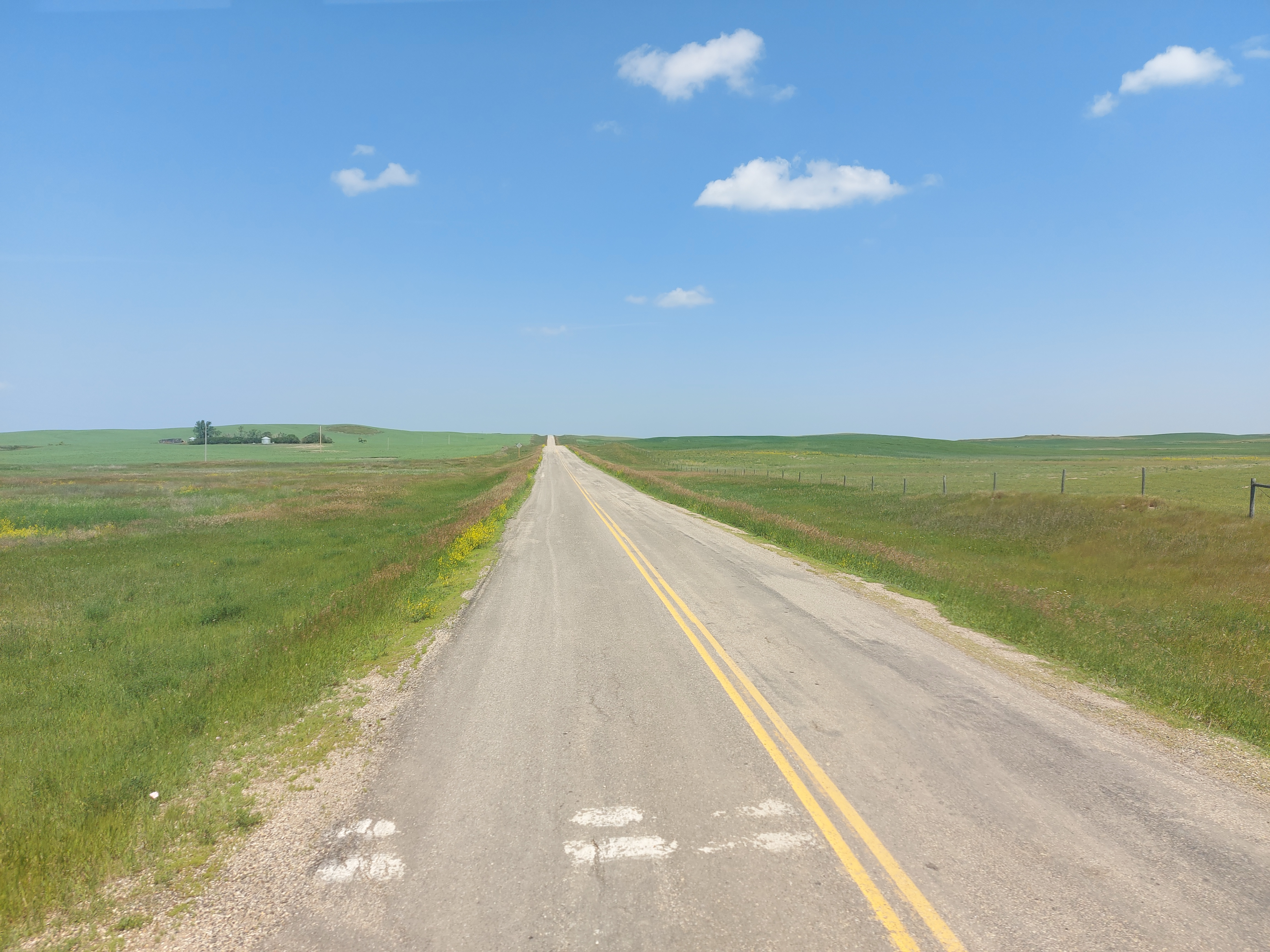
- Highway 334

Route information
- Maintained by Ministry of Highways and Infrastructure
- Length: 95.6 km (59.4 mi)

Major junctions
- South end: Highway 13 / Highway 34 west of Ogema
- Highway 339 at Avonlea
- North end: CanAm Highway / Highway 6 / Highway 39 at Corinne

Location
- Country: Canada
- Province: Saskatchewan
- Rural municipalities: Key West, Elmsthorpe, Caledonia, Bratt's Lake

Highway system
- Provincial highways in Saskatchewan
← Highway 332	→ Highway 335

Highway 334 is a provincial highway in the Canadian province of Saskatchewan. It runs from the Highway 13 / Highway 34 junction, approximately 18 kilometres (11 mi) north of Bengough and 16 kilometres (10 mi) west of Ogema, north to Highway 6 / Highway 39 at Corinne. The highway is about 96 kilometres (60 mi) long and passes through the communities of Avonlea and Kayville. Dunnet Regional Park is also accessible from the highway.

== Route description ==
Hwy 334 begins in the Rural Municipality of Key West No. 70 at a junction with Hwy 13 (Red Coat Trail / Ghost Town Trail) halfway between Horizon and Glasnevin, with the road continuing south as Hwy 34. It heads north through rural prairie lands, going through a switchback and having an intersection with Hwy 717 before passing through Kayville, where it crosses a former railway line. The highway curves eastward along Township Road 94 for a short distance before curving back northward, winding its way along the eastern edge of The Dirt Hills for the next several kilometres, where it enters the Rural Municipality of Elmsthorpe No. 100, has an intersection with Township Road 112 (provides access to Truax), crosses several small creeks, and passes by Dunnet Regional Park (accessed via Township Road 122). Entering the village of Avonlea, Hwy 334 crosses a railway and travels through an industrial area on the east side of town to an intersection with Hwy 339 on the north side of town, where Hwy 334 makes a sharp right and heads due east, leaving Avonlea and travelling through rural farmland to cross a bridge over Avonlea Creek, as it passes by the Long Creek Golf and Country Club, and have a short concurrency (overlap) with Hwy 623. Entering the Rural Municipality of Caledonia No. 99, the highway travels through the Piapot 75H First Nation reserve before curving northward for a short distance, where it crosses a bridge over the Moose Jaw River. Curving back eastward, it travels along the Rural Municipality of Bratt's Lake No. 129 boundary as it enters Corinne, where it crosses a railway line and comes to an end at an intersection with Hwy 6 / Hwy 39 (CanAm Highway). The entire length of Hwy 334 is a paved, two lane highway with the exception of a short 5.7 kilometres (3.5 mi) section just north of Kayville where it runs along Township Road 94, which is gravel.

== Major intersections ==
From south to north:

Rural municipality	Location	km	mi	Destinations	Notes
Key West No. 70		0.0	0.0	Highway 34 south – Bengough Highway 13 (Red Coat Trail / Ghost Town Trail) – Assiniboia, Ogema, Weyburn	Southern terminus; northern terminus of Hwy 34; road continues south as Hwy 34
Key West No. 70		17.5	10.9	Highway 717 west (Township Road 90) – Crane Valley, Ormiston	Eastern terminus of Hwy 717
Key West No. 70	Kayville	20.8	12.9	Township Road 92	
Key West No. 70		24.2	15.0	Southern end of unpaved section	
Key West No. 70		29.9	18.6	Northern end of unpaved section	
Elmsthorpe No. 100		47.8	29.7	Township Road 112 to Highway 623 – Truax	
Elmsthorpe No. 100		57.8	35.9	Township Road 122 – Dunnet Regional Park	
Elmsthorpe No. 100	Avonlea	62.0	38.5	Highway 339 north – Briercrest	Southern terminus of Hwy 339; Hwy 334 branches east; directional signage changes
Elmsthorpe No. 100		67.5	41.9	Bridge over Avonlea Creek	
Elmsthorpe No. 100		68.5	42.6	Highway 623 north (Range Road 2224) – Rouleau	West end of Hwy 623 concurrency
Elmsthorpe No. 100		70.2	43.6	Highway 623 south (Range Road 2223) – Ogema	East end of Hwy 623 concurrency
Caledonia No. 99		86.1– 86.2	53.5– 53.6	Bridge over the Moose Jaw River	
Caledonia No. 99–Bratt's Lake No. 129 line	Corinne	95.6	59.4	Highway 6 / Highway 39 / CanAm Highway – Moose Jaw, Regina, Minton, Weyburn	4th Base Line; eastern (northern) terminus; road continues east as Township Road 130
1.000 mi = 1.609 km; 1.000 km = 0.621 mi: Concurrency terminus

== See also ==
- Transportation in Saskatchewan
- Roads in Saskatchewan
