= Saskatchewan Highway 36 =

Provincial highway in Saskatchewan, Canada

Highway 36
- Highway 36 highlighted in red
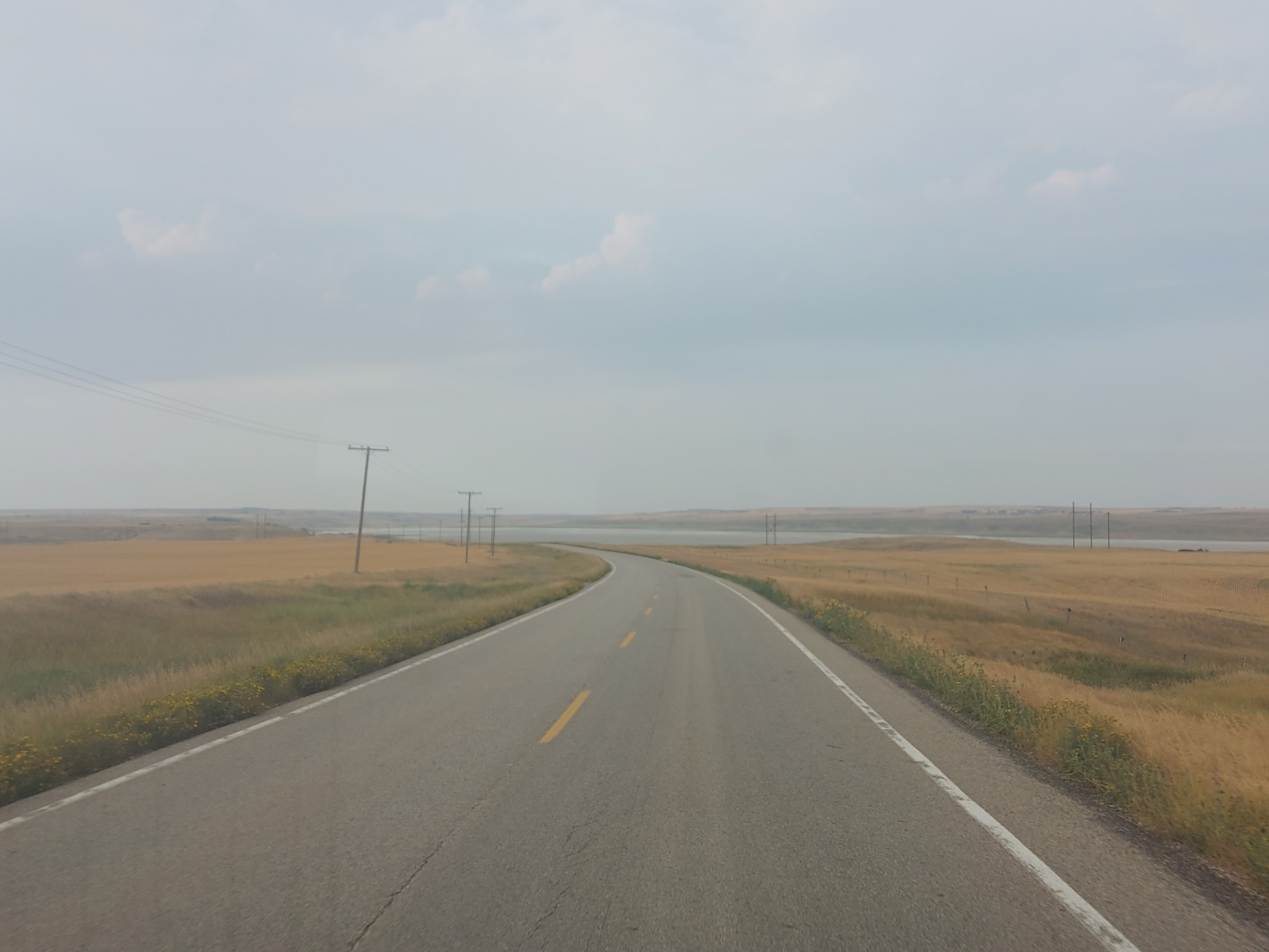
- Highway 36 with Willow Bunch Lake in the background

Route information
- Maintained by Ministry of Highways and Infrastructure
- Length: 144.2 km (89.6 mi)

Major junctions
- South end: MT 13 at the U.S. border near Coronach
- Highway 18 near Coronach; Highway 13 near Verwood
- North end: Highway 2 south of Moose Jaw

Location
- Country: Canada
- Province: Saskatchewan
- Rural municipalities: Hart Butte, Poplar Valley, Willow Bunch, Excel, Terrell, Baildon

Highway system
- Provincial highways in Saskatchewan
← Highway 35	→ Highway 37

Highway 36 is a provincial highway in the Canadian province of Saskatchewan. It runs from Montana Highway 13 at the US border at the Port of Coronach north to Highway 2. It is about 144 kilometres (89 mi) long.

== Route description ==
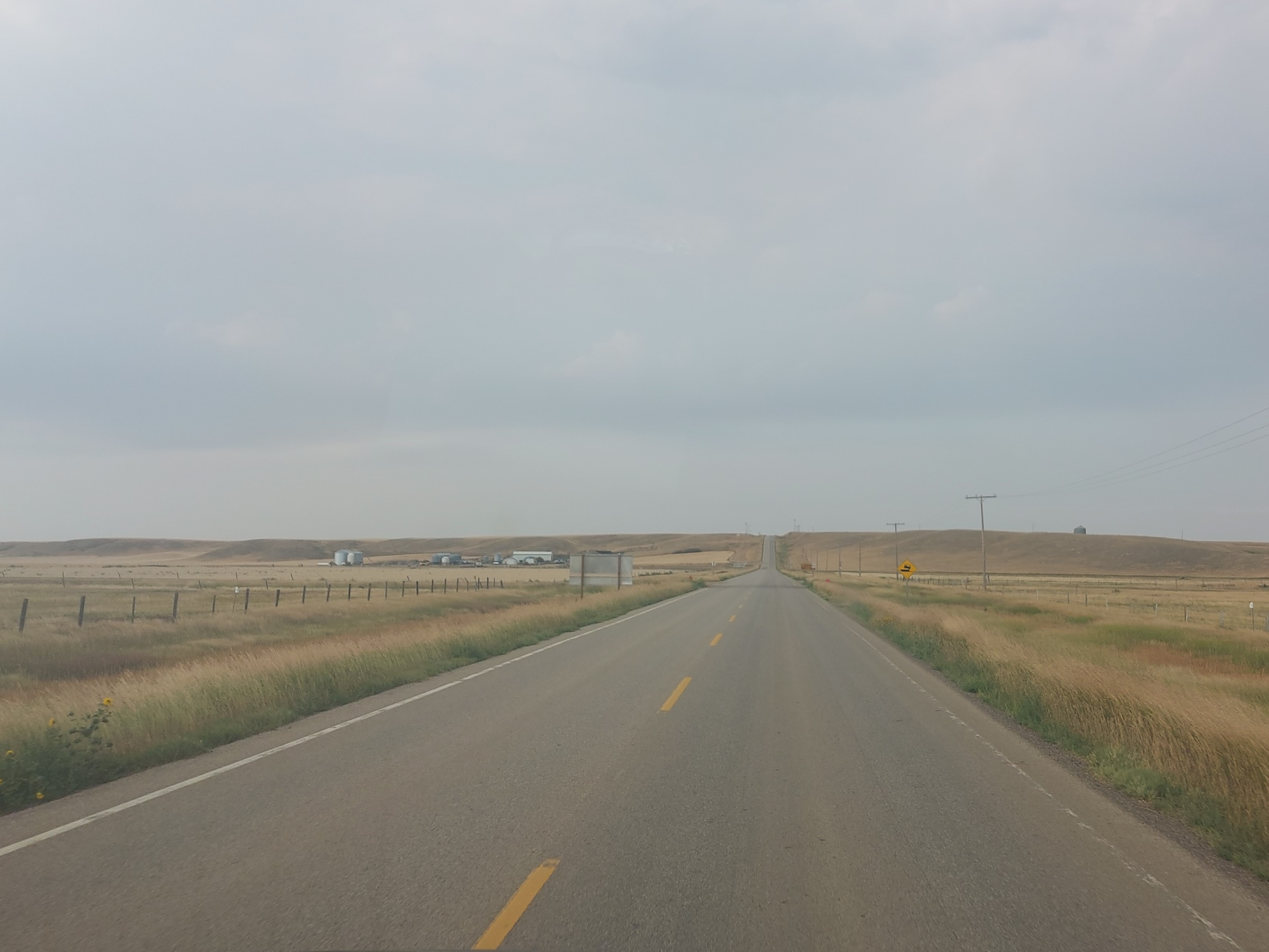
Highway 36 on the north side of Willow Bunch

Highway 36 begins at the Scobey–Coronach Border Crossing and heads due north where it meets and begins a 21-kilometre (13 mi) concurrency with Highway 18. The concurrency heads west where it crosses the East Poplar River — a major tributary of the Poplar River and the location of the Poplar River Power Station. From the river crossing, Highway 36 and 18 head north-west to Coronach. Beyond Coronach, the concurrency continues north-west for a further 11 kilometres (6.8 mi) before Highway 18 splits off west and Highway 36 continues north towards Willow Bunch. As the highway approaches Willow Bunch, it provides access to Jean Louis Legare Regional Park and traverses the Big Muddy Badlands.

Highway 36 continues north from Willow Bunch where it runs past the western shore of Willow Bunch Lake and meets Highway 13. It has a 9.7 kilometres (6.0 mi) eastward concurrency with 13 before returning to its northerly routing towards Highway 2. Along the route towards Highway 2, it passes through the communities of Crane Valley and Galilee and to the west of The Dirt and Cactus Hills.

== Major intersections ==
From south to north:

Rural municipality	Location	km	mi	Destinations	Notes
Hart Butte No. 11	Port of Coronach	0.0	0.0	MT 13 south – Wolf Point	Continuation into Montana
Hart Butte No. 11	Port of Coronach	0.0	0.0	Canada–United States border at Scobey–Coronach Border Crossing	
Hart Butte No. 11		9.9	6.2	Highway 18 east – Big River, Estevan	South end of Hwy 18 concurrency
Hart Butte No. 11	Coronach	19.3	12.0	Highway 602 north – Harptree	
Poplar Valley No. 12		30.4	18.9	Highway 18 west – Rockglen	North end of Hwy 18 concurrency
Willow Bunch No. 42	Willow Bunch	54.2	33.7	Highway 705 west	South end of Hwy 705 concurrency
Willow Bunch No. 42	Willow Bunch	55.0	34.2	Highway 705 east – Harptree	North end of Hwy 705 concurrency
Willow Bunch No. 42		69.8	43.4	Highway 13 west (Red Coat Trail) – Assiniboia	South end of Hwy 13 concurrency
Excel No. 71		73.3	45.5	Verwood access road	
Excel No. 71		79.5	49.4	Highway 13 east (Red Coat Trail) – Weyburn	North end of Hwy 13 concurrency
Excel No. 71		92.4	57.4	Highway 717 west – Assiniboia	South end of Hwy 717 concurrency
Excel No. 71		98.9	61.5	Highway 717 east – Kayville	North end of Hwy 717 concurrency
Excel No. 71	Crane Valley	105.4	65.5	Ormiston access road	
Terrell No. 101		115.1	71.5	Highway 713 – Cardross	
Terrell No. 101		126.7	78.7	Highway 715 – Ardill, Spring Valley	
Baildon No. 131		144.2	89.6	Highway 2 – Assiniboia, Moose Jaw	
1.000 mi = 1.609 km; 1.000 km = 0.621 mi: Concurrency terminus; Route transition

== See also ==
- Transportation in Saskatchewan
- Roads in Saskatchewan
