= Avonlea =

Avonlea may refer to:

- Avonlea (Anne of Green Gables), a fictional town from Lucy Maud Montgomery's novel Anne of Green Gables
- Road to Avonlea, a television series retitled Avonlea in some markets
- Avonlea, Saskatchewan, a village in Saskatchewan, Canada
- Avonlea Creek, a river in southern Saskatchewan
- Avonlea Reservoir, a man-made lake in southern Saskatchewan
- Avonlea Badlands, landform in Saskatchewan
- Avonlea, Harare, a residential suburb of Harare, Zimbabwe
- Avonlea culture, an archaeological culture in the United States and Canada

== See also ==
- Avonleigh, a house in Rockhampton, Queensland, Australia
- Avonley Nguyen (born 2002), American ice dancer
- Avonsleigh, a town in Victoria, Australia
