= Baildon (disambiguation) =

Baildon may refer to:

- Andrew Baildon (born 1971), Australian former freestyle and butterfly Olympic swimmer
- Baildon, civil parish and town in West Yorkshire, Northern England
- Baildon railway station serving the town of Baildon near Shipley in West Yorkshire, England
- George Baildon (1868–1946), New Zealand businessman and Mayor of Auckland City
- Henry Bellyse Baildon (1849–1907), 19th century Scottish scholar and poet
- John Baildon (1772–1846), Scottish pioneer in metallurgy in continental Europe
- Baildon Katowice, ice hockey team from Katowice, Poland
- Rural Municipality of Baildon No. 131, rural municipality in the Canadian province of Saskatchewan
- Baildon, Saskatchewan, unincorporated community in Baildon Rural Municipality No. 131, Saskatchewan, Canada
- Baildon Steelworks, a major steelworks in Katowice, Poland

== See also ==
- Badon (disambiguation)
- Bailon
- Basildon
- Basilodon
- Brasilodon
