= Claybank Brick Plant =

National historic site in Saskatchewan, Canada

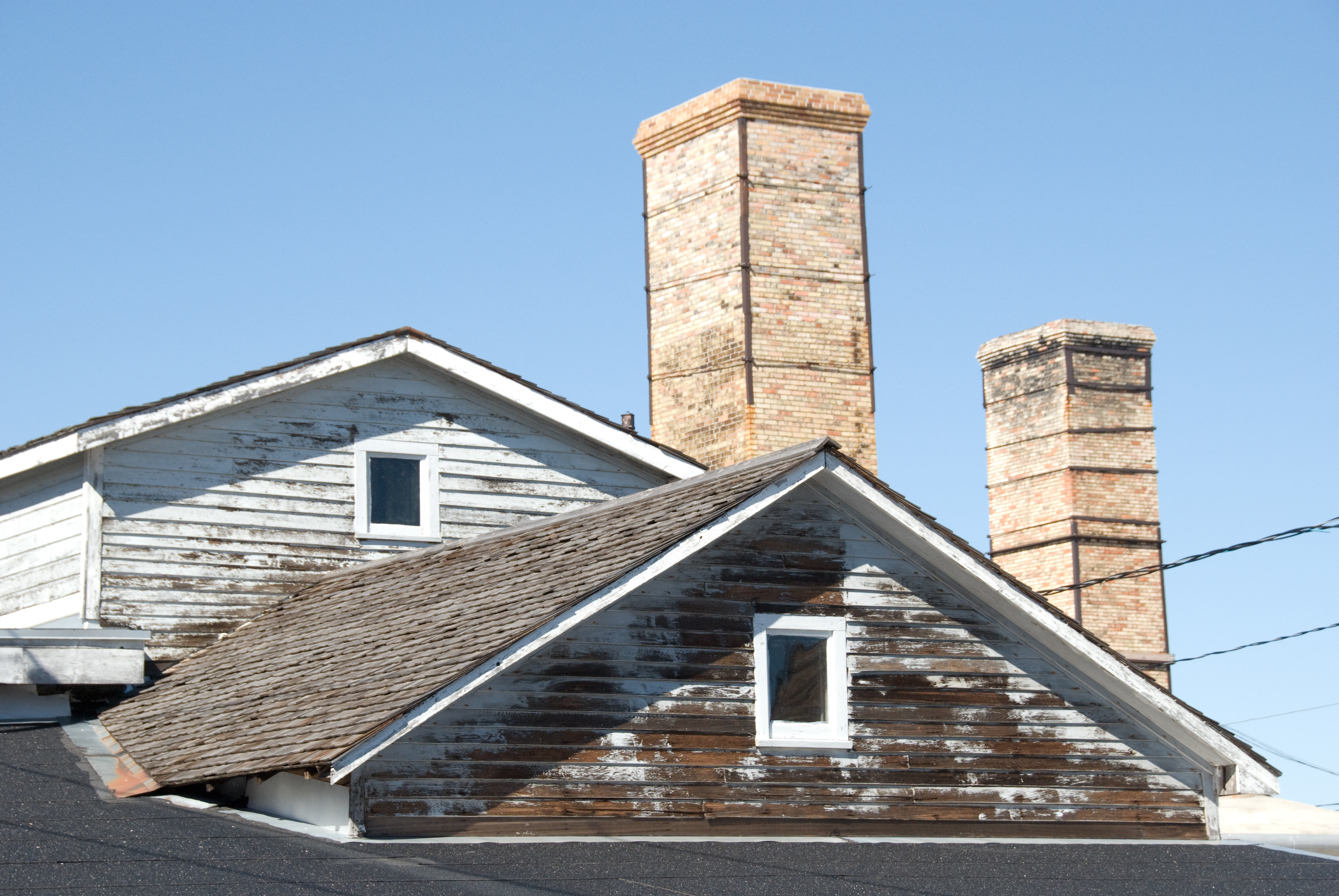
- Interactive map of Claybank Brick Plant
- Location: Elmsthorpe No. 100, Saskatchewan, Canada
- Coordinates: 50°01′49″N 105°13′11″W
- Established: 1912-13
- Visitors: Open by appointment
- Website: Claybank Brick

The Claybank Brick Plant National Historic Site, located near Claybank, Saskatchewan at the foot of the Dirt Hills in the RM of Elmsthorpe No. 100, was an operational brick manufacturing plant from 1914 to 1989. Bricks manufactured at the site have been used to construct prominent Canadian buildings such as the Bessborough Hotel in Saskatoon and the Chateau Frontenac in Quebec City. The site was designated as a National Historic Site in 1996 and remains one of Canada's greatest examples of early twentieth century industrialism.

Claybank Brick Plant
- National Historic Site of Canada
- Claybank Brick Plant National Historic Site
- Claybank Brick Plant National Historic Site Claybank Brick Plant (Canada)
- Coordinates: 50.0149°N 105.1311°W
- Country: Canada
- Province: Saskatchewan
- Rural municipality: Elmsthorpe No. 100
- Founded: 1912
- Designated National Historic Site: 1994
- Designated Provincial Heritage Property: 1998
- Time zone: Central Standard Time
- Postal code: S0H 0W0
- Highway: Highway 339

== History ==
The land around the Claybank Brick Plant National historic Site has been inhabited by various First Nations groups for thousands of years. While they undoubtedly hunted and gathered in the area, it is also very probable that they utilized the rich clay deposits of the area to produce clay pottery and other tools. Despite a long history of human occupation in the area, it was not until fairly recently, the late nineteen century, that recent European settlers in the area discovered the valuable clay deposits, recognized their economic importance and begun to utilize them on an industrial scale.

- 1886 - Discovery: Thomas McWilliams, a homesteader from the Moose Jaw River area, was the first to recognize the economic potential of the clay found in hills of this area. He discovered the clay one day in 1886 while out looking for lost cattle and picking Saskatoon berries. Thomas travelled to Moose Jaw to the land titles office to lay claim to the clay-rich land. He later moved his family to the new homestead. Near the same time, he sought permission from the federal government to mine the refractory clay on his land. This is the first official record of the Claybank clay deposits. Over the next, almost twenty years, Thomas mined and sold clay to the Wellington White brick plant in Moose Jaw.
- 1904 - Partnership: In 1904, Thomas entered into a formal partnership with the Moose Jaw Fire Brick and Pottery Company. As a result, the company acquired Mr. McWilliam's original homestead plus other nearby clay deposits. Despite the investment and exceptional quality of the clay, a lack of infrastructure and the distance to consumer markets, made the endeavour unprofitable as Moose Jaw was over 50 km away and the clay had to be hauled by horse and wagon. That, however, was about to change.
- 1910 - Development: In 1910, the Canadian Northern Railway came to the area and overnight, the problem of lack of access to markets was resolved. A spur line from the main rail line at Claybank was constructed and plans were immediately made to build a new coal-fired brick plant. In 1912, the Moose Jaw Fire Brick and Pottery Company bought out Tom McWilliams' remaining shares and transformed itself into Saskatchewan Clay Products. The new plant, begun in 1912, was completed in 1914 however, because of the economic difficulties related to World War I, it was forced to cease operations until 1916.
- 1916 - Re-organization: The Dominion Fire Brick and Clay Products Ltd. was the result of a company re-organization in 1916. The plant was immediately pressed back into service. The newly re-branded and re-energized company expanded its product line to include face brick and specialized fire brick. These new innovate products helped the company survive the immediate post-war years as the expansion of railways and industrialization following the war, meant high demand for the company's products. The development of the specialized product line also helped the company survive the Great Depression, to such an extent that by 1938 the Claybank brick plant was the busiest in the province. During World War II demand for the company's specialized refractory bricks, used in Corvette warships, ensured its prosperity, while face brick production also continued. In post-war years the Claybank brick plant continued to prosper and by 1950 it was the largest clay plant in Saskatchewan.
- 1954 - Foreign Control: In 1954 the plant was bought by the Alberta-based, Redcliffe Pressed Brick, who renamed the company, Dominion Fire Brick and Clay Products. The following year, controlling interest in the plant was transferred to A.P. Green Fire Brick Company of Mexico, Missouri. The company, one of North America's leading producers of refractory products, modernized the plant's operations, including converting six of the ten coal-fired kilns to natural gas. Despite these improvements the plant began experiencing financial difficulties in the mid-1950s as a result of the decline in the demand for locomotive brick as railways converted to diesel locomotives. In the 1960s, the company also discontinued production of its famous face brick. While the conversion of the kilns to natural gas offered several advantages, it had proved devastating to the demand for Claybank face brick as the coal-fired kilns had given the brick its colour - colour that was lost with natural gas. In 1962 A.P. Green gained complete control of the Claybank brick plant but the company continued to operate under the name Dominion Fire Brick and Clay Products until 31 December 1970.
- 1971 - Decline: In 1971 the plant became a subsidiary of A.P. Green Refractories (Canada) Ltd. This limited the plant's prospects and appears to have hastened the plant's financial decline. Dwindling markets for refractory bricks, changing technology, the plant's outmoded equipment and corporate downsizing all contributed to the closure of the 75 year old plant in 1989.
- 1989 - Heritage Property: With the closure of the plant in June 1989 the Government of Saskatchewan decided to designate the plant as a provincial heritage site. A.P. Green donated the brick plant, machinery and equipment to the Saskatchewan Heritage Foundation in 1992. In 1994 the plant was declared a national historic site and in 1998 the Claybank Brick Plant was officially designated as Provincial Heritage Property. The Claybank Brick plant has been conserved as a part of Saskatchewan's industrial heritage with its official announcement 29 June 1997 as a National Historic Site of Canada by Minister of Canadian Heritage Sheila Copps. $2 million for the conservation and presentation of the Brick Plant by Claybank was contributed jointly between Federal and Provincial Government funding departments. In 2015, the Saskatchewan Heritage Foundation partnered with the Prince's Charities Canada and the Prince's Regeneration Trust, philanthropic organizations established by the Prince of Wales, to undertake a review of the operations at Claybank Brick Plant National Historic Site.

== Products ==
Face Brick: The Claybank Plant produced a distinctive brick that was used in many prominent buildings across Canada including the Château Frontenac in Quebec City, the Delta Bessborough in Saskatoon, the Gravelbourg Cathedral, in Gravelbourg and many courthouses and public buildings throughout Saskatchewan. The face brick was produced until the 1960s before being discontinued.

Fire Brick: Claybank is home to deposits of a rare form of refractory clay that has exceptional heat resistant qualities. The rare fire brick produced from this clay, since the 1920s, have been used in fireplaces and furnaces as well as having lined the fire boxes of CN Rail and CP Rail locomotives and the boilers Corvette warships produced during the Second World War. So good was the fire brick produced at Claybank at insulating against extreme heat that it was used in the construction of the NASA rocket launch pads at Cape Canaveral, Florida.

== Geology ==
Nestled in the Dirt Hills of southern Saskatchewan, the Claybank Brick Plant used clay from the nearby Massold Clay Canyons. The Dirt Hills, the result of Pleistocene glacial action, overlay the Whitemud Formation. The Whitemud geological formation, formed in the late Cretaceous period and found throughout the plains of southern Saskatchewan, south-eastern and south-central Alberta, is a source of high-quality refractory clay; white kaolinitic and bentonitic clays. Claybank itself is home to two main types of clay; white and grey in colour which possess different properties, valuable in producing bricks for various purposes.

== Claybank Brick Plant National Historic Site Activities ==
The plant is currently open for tours seven days per week from June to the end of August. Self-guided tours operate all day and special guided tours are available daily at 10:30 and 1:30. In addition, school and group tours are available upon request. The Bunkhouse Café and Gift Shop are located in the interpretive centre where fresh, homemade food and baking can be found, in addition to Saskatchewan souvenirs and local crafts. The Claybank Brick Plant Annual Heritage Event takes place the last Sunday of June.

Past events: In 2009 and 2010, the plant was home to the Canada's largest Airsoft event, dubbed Operation: Mason Relic, and will host the event again in 2011. Massold Clay Canyon 3 km Colour Run was held in June of 2018

== Massold Clay Canyons ==
The Massold Clay Canyons are a 256-acre historic and wildlife area adjacent to the Claybank Brick Plant. The canyons consist of historic clay bits and nature wildlife areas. In 2001, the Claybank Brick Plant and Historical Society bought the land from Saskatchewan Environment and Resource Management. The ground lays untouched by the farmer's plough and as such, has remained virtually unchanged since the last ice age. There are many plants indigenous to the area and the hills are rich in local prairie wildlife. Hiking is available through the interpretive centre at the Claybank Brick Plant National Historic Site.

== Gallery ==
Images from around the Claybank Brick Plant National Historic Site and the Massold Clay Canyons near Claybank, Saskatchewan.

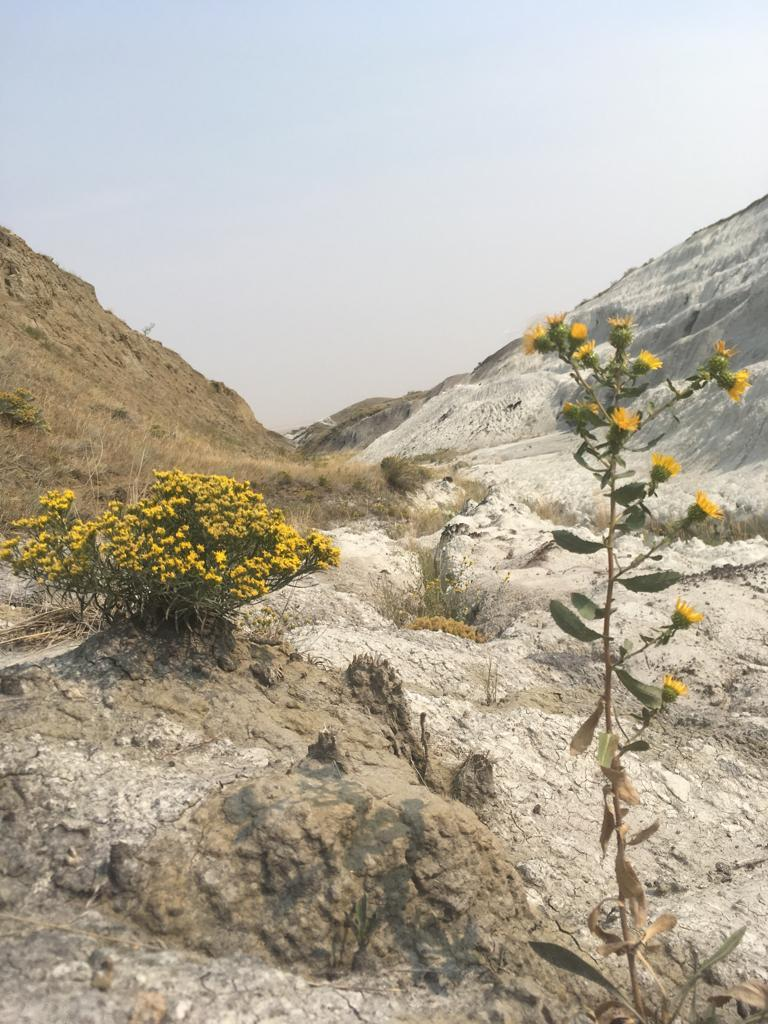
Massold Clay Canyons

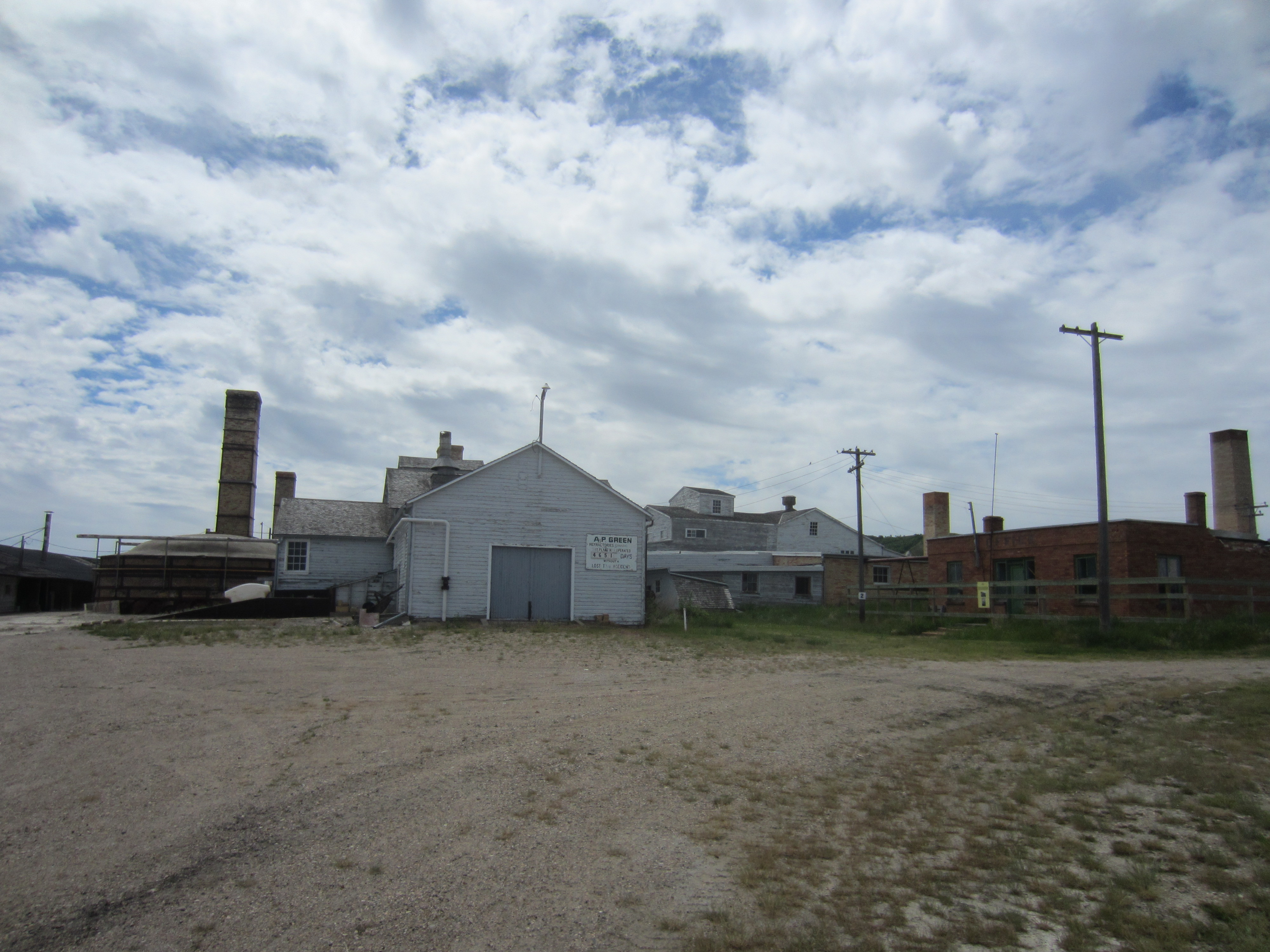
Looking west from the bunkhouse

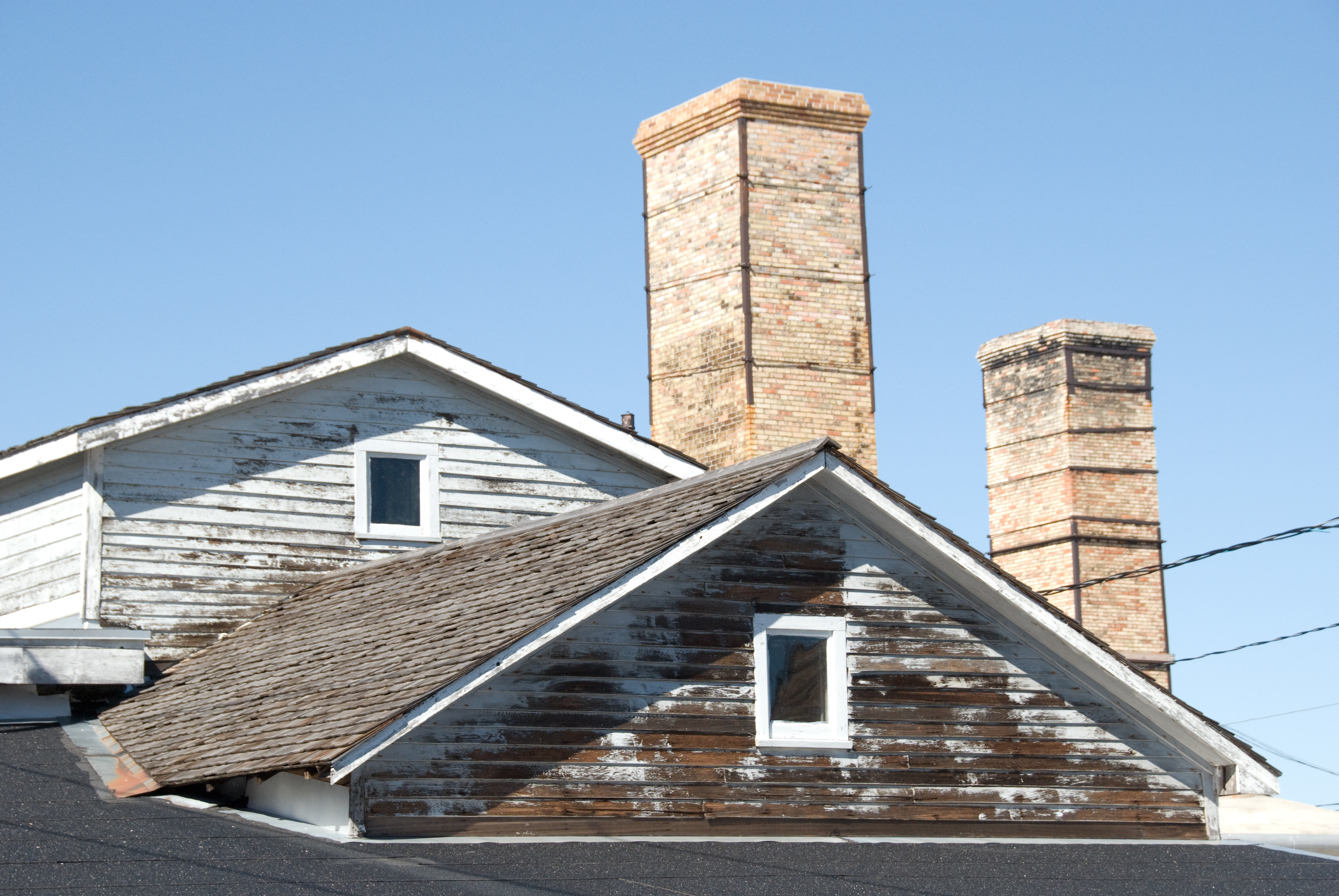
Closeup of the plant's roof line

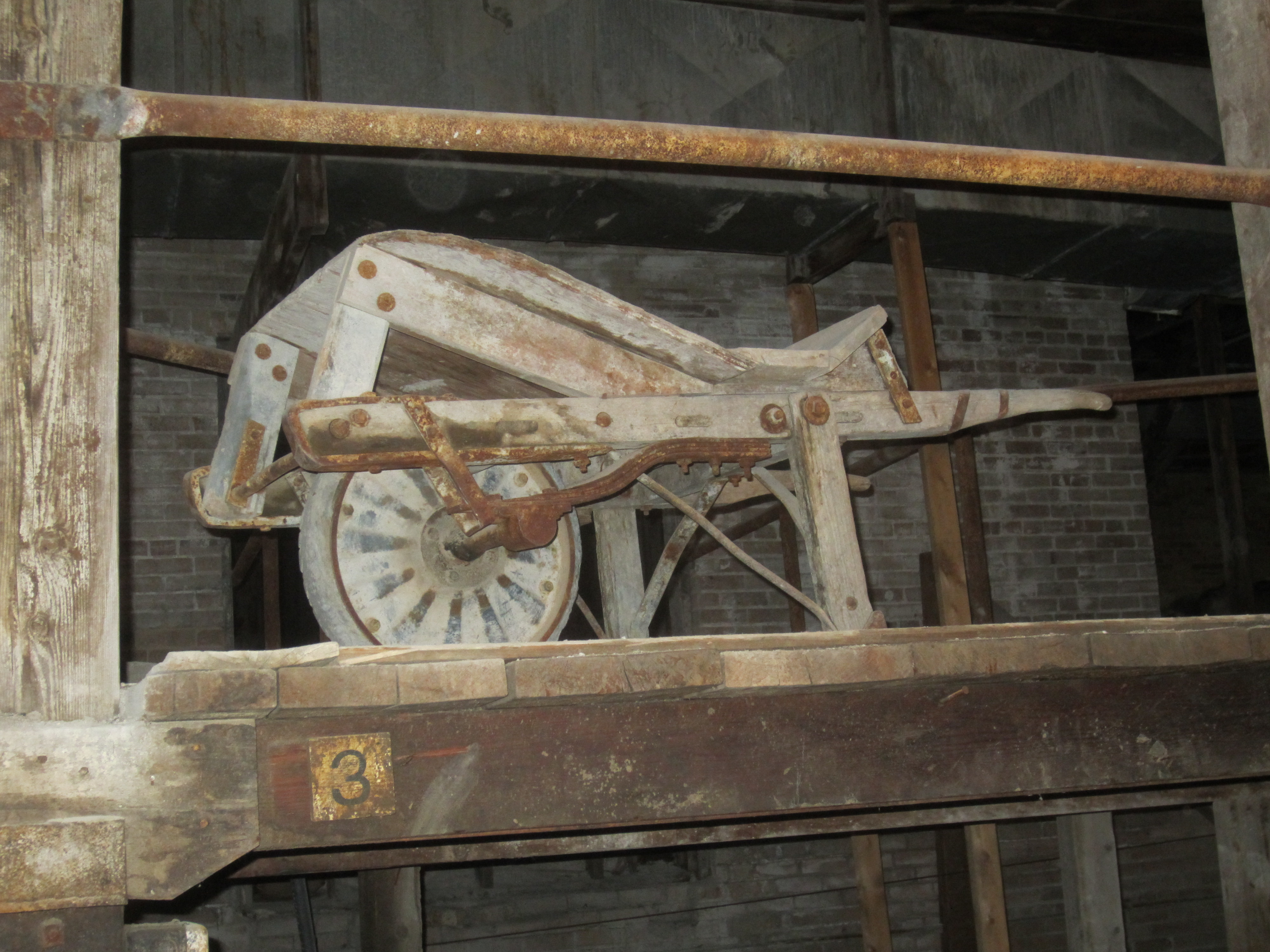
Wheelbarrow for bricks

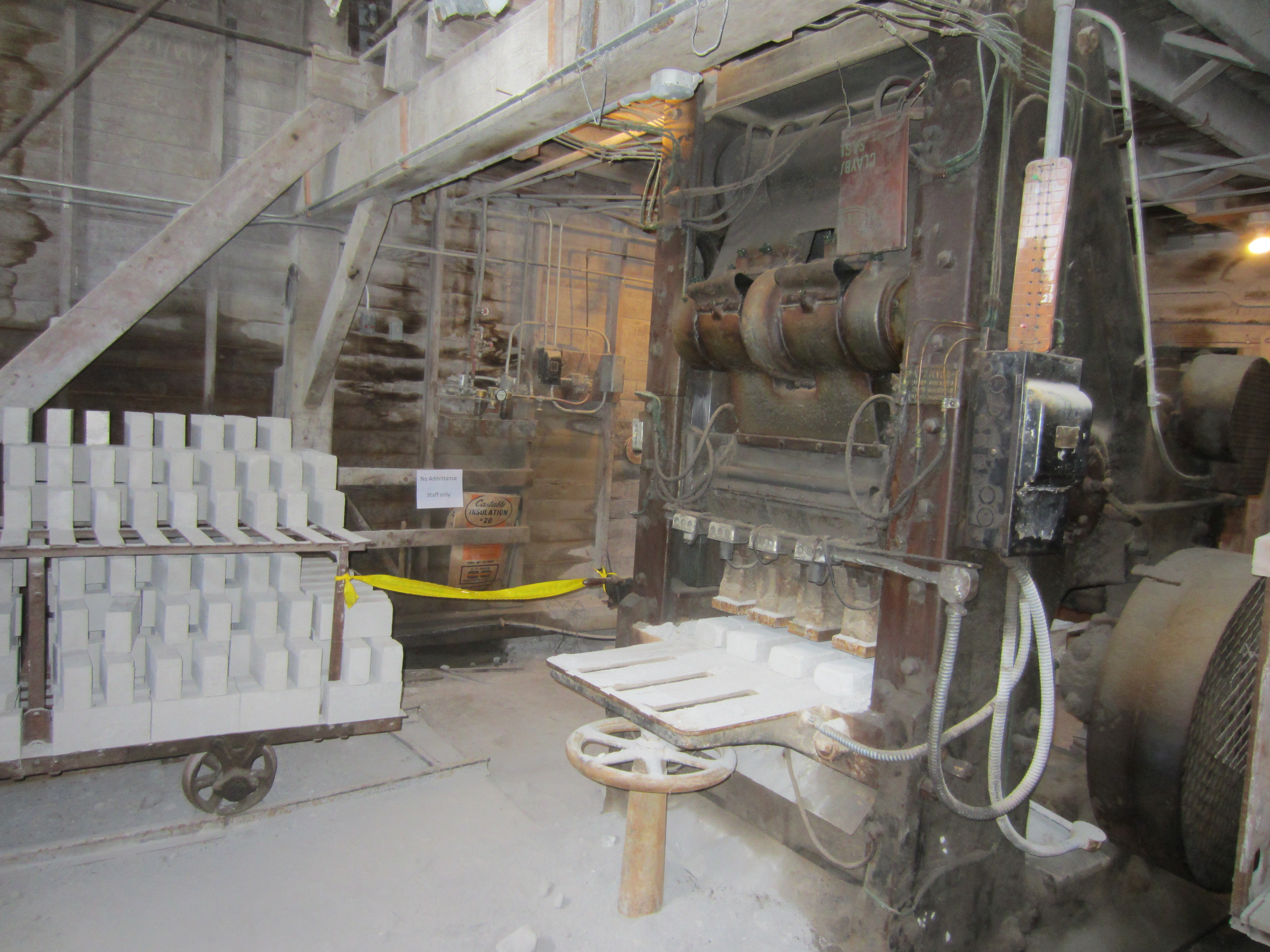
Brick press and un-fired bricks

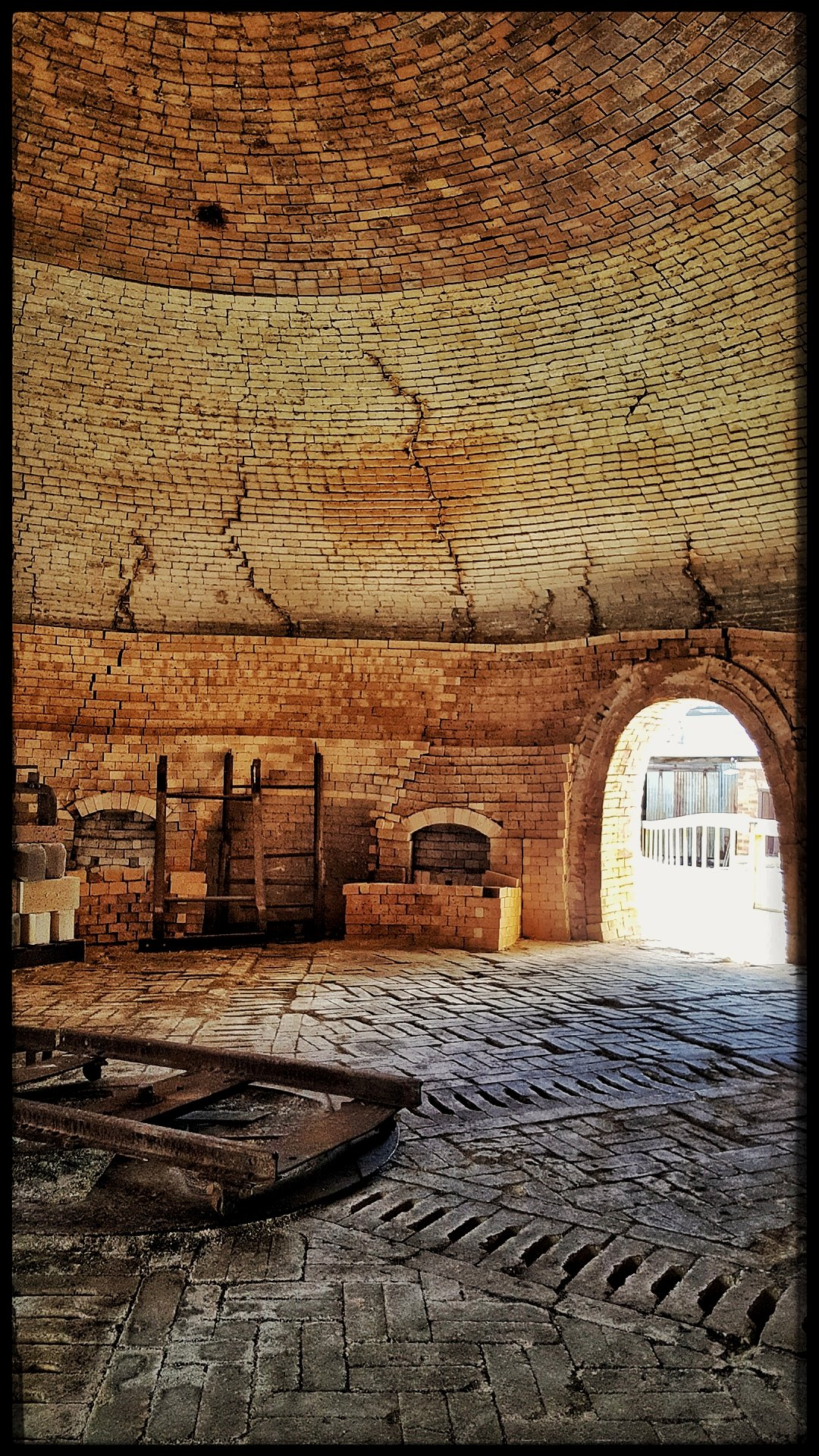
View from inside a brick kiln

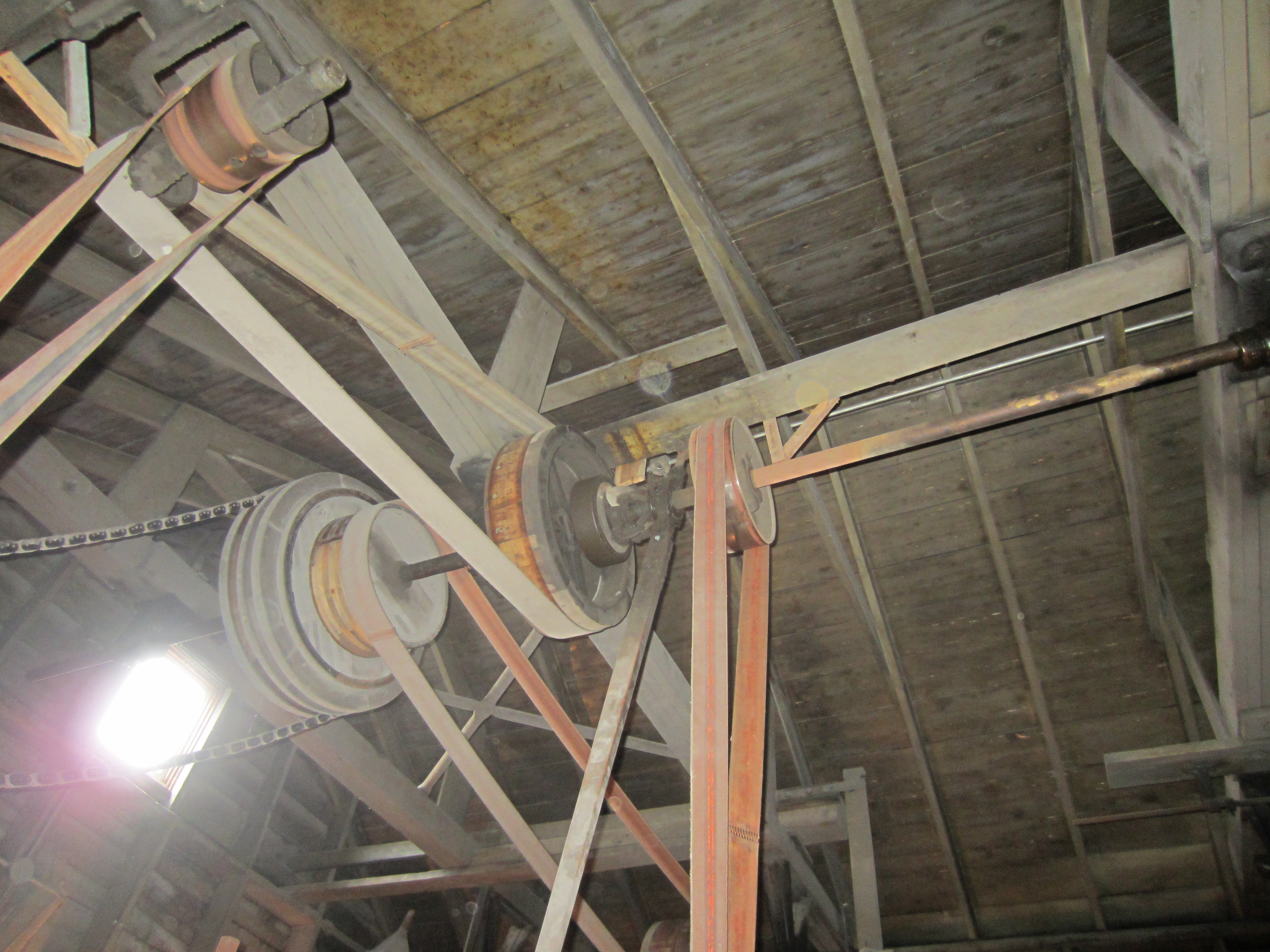
Power system

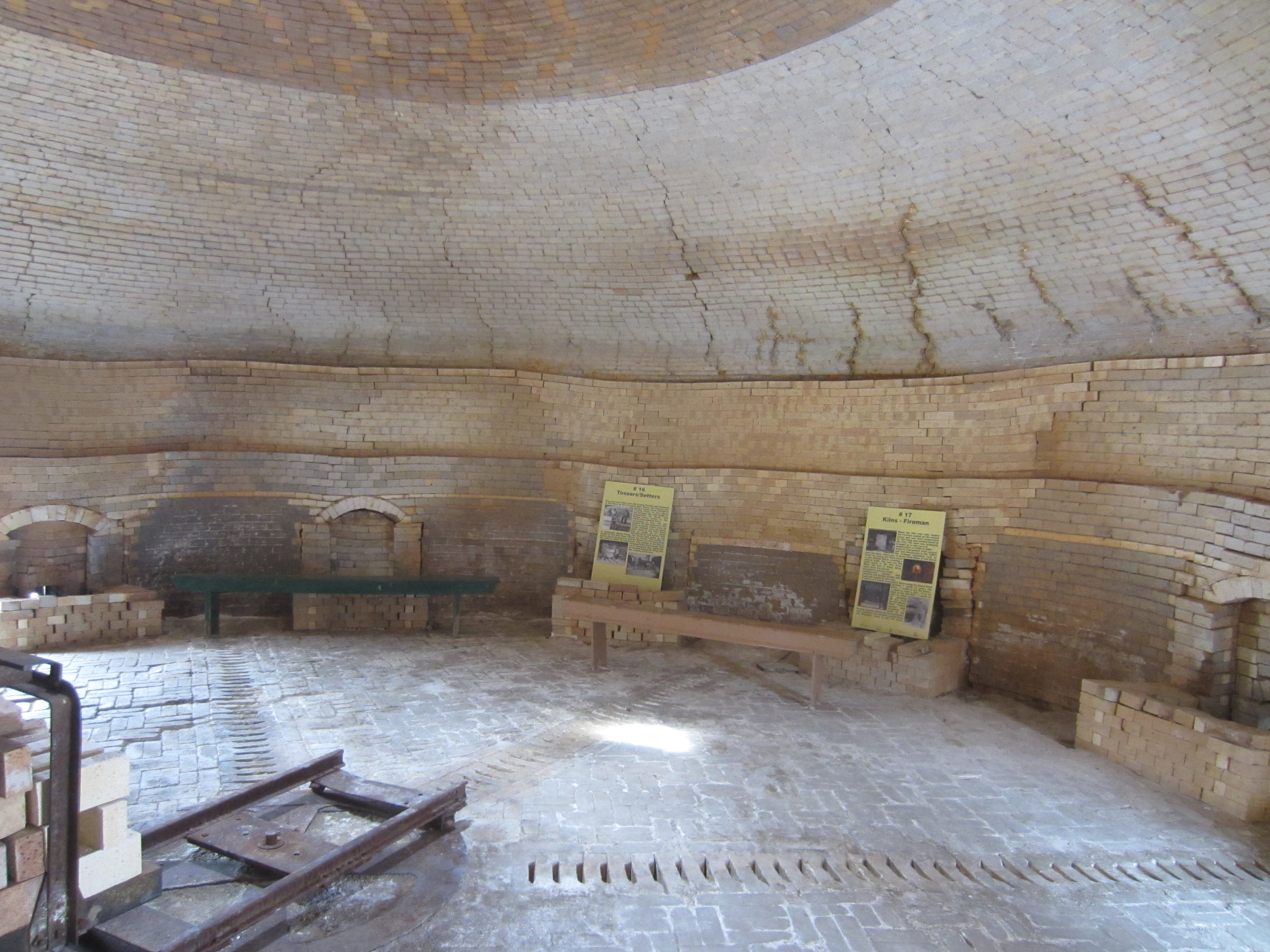
Inside a kiln

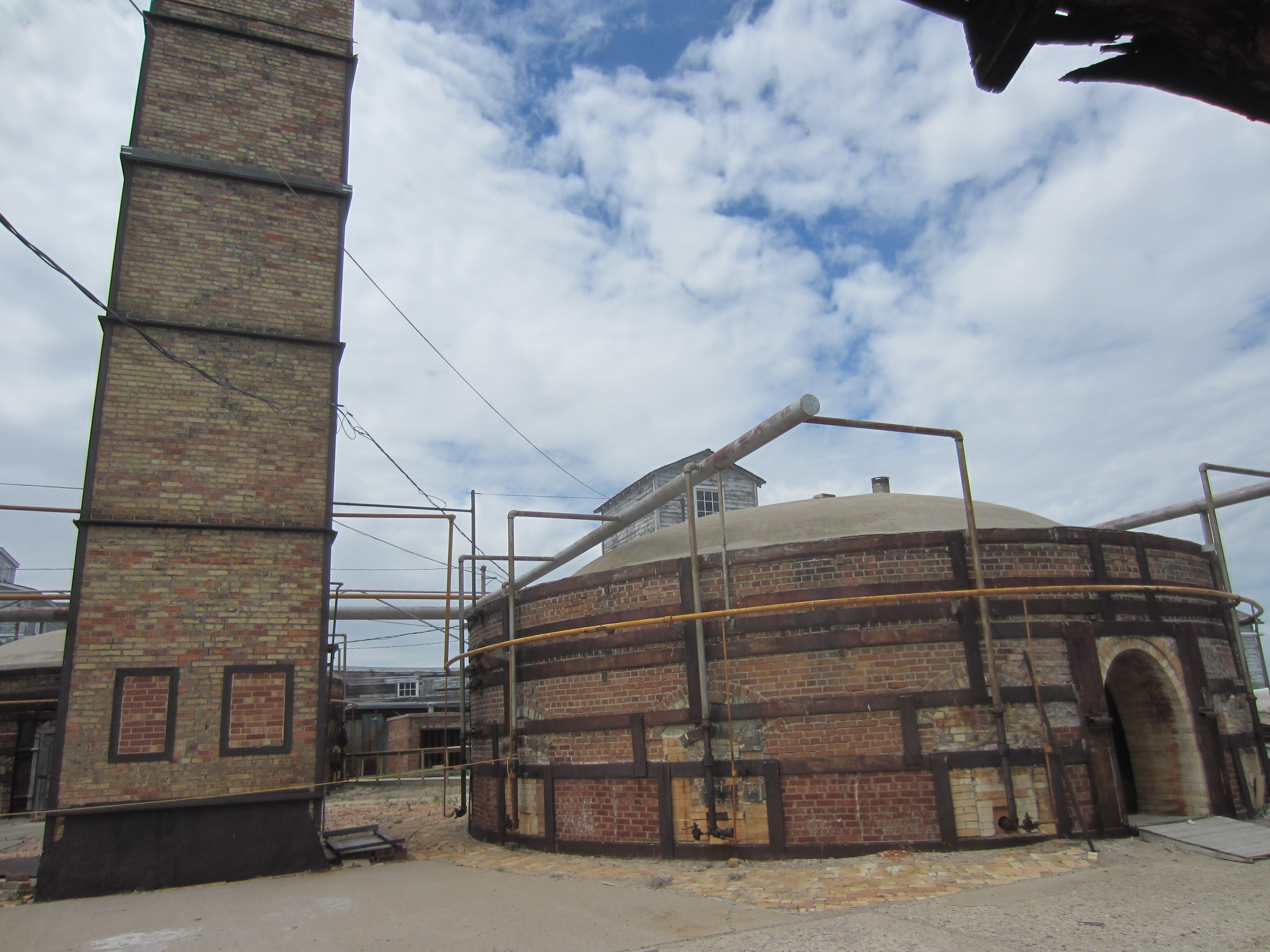
Exterior of a down-draft kiln

== Nearby Attractions ==
The Claybank Brick Plant National Historic Site is located in the RM of Elmsthorpe No.100 near the communities of Claybank, Avonlea, Briercrest, and Truax, Saskatchewan. Nearby tourist attractions include;

- Dunnet Regional Park
- Long Creek Golf Course
- Briercrest Museum
- Avonlea Heritage Museum
- First Nations ceremonial sites
- Avonlea Badlands

== See also ==
- List of National Historic Sites of Canada in Saskatchewan
- List of historic places in rural municipalities of Saskatchewan
