= Claybank =

Claybank may refer to:

- Claybank, Saskatchewan
- Claybank Brick Plant
- Claybanks Township, Michigan
- The red dun horse coat color
