= Crystal Hill, Saskatchewan =

Hamlet in Saskatchewan, Canada

Coordinates: 49°50′00″N 105°15′02″W

Crystal Hill is a hamlet in Terrell Rural Municipality No. 101 in the province of Saskatchewan, Canada. The hamlet is located 21 km east of Highway 36 on Highway 713. Very little remains of Crystal Hill.

== See also ==
- List of communities in Saskatchewan
- List of hamlets in Saskatchewan
