= Bayard, Saskatchewan =

Hamlet in Saskatchewan, Canada

Coordinates: 50.022°N 105.291°W

Bayard is an organized hamlet in the RM of Terrell No. 101 in the Canadian province of Saskatchewan. It is located along Highway 715 approximately 4 km southwest of Claybank in the Dirt Hills. The area was populated by German immigrants primarily from Bukovina during the late 19th and early 20th century.

== Population ==
Demographics

Canada census – Bayard, Saskatchewan community profile

	2011
Population	5 (0.0% from 2006)
Land area	0.27 km^{2} (0.10 sq mi)
Population density	18.8/km^{2} (49/sq mi)
Median age
Private dwellings	2 (total)
Median household income

References: 2011

== See also ==
- List of communities in Saskatchewan
- List of hamlets in Saskatchewan
