= Elmsthorpe =

Elmsthorpe may refer to:

- Elmesthorpe, a village in the United Kingdom
- Rural Municipality of Elmsthorpe No. 100, Saskatchewan, Canada
