= Southern Rails Cooperative =

Canadian railway company

Southern Rails Cooperative Ltd.
Overview
- Headquarters: Avonlea, Saskatchewan
- Reporting mark: SORA
- Locale: southwestern Saskatchewan
- Dates of operation: 1989–

Technical
- Track gauge: 4 ft 8 1/2 in (1,435 mm) standard gauge

The Southern Rails Cooperative Ltd. (SRCL) (reporting mark SORA) is a Canadian short line railway company operating on trackage in southwest Saskatchewan. Southern Rails Cooperative was the first shortline railway to operate in Saskatchewan and operated as the first modern common carrier shortline railway. The railway is a farmer owned co-operative that operates two short-line railways in Saskatchewan, totalling 71 km of trackage: the former Canadian Pacific Railway Colony subdivision that runs from Rockglen to Killdeer, and the former Canadian National Railway Avonlea subdivision that runs from Avonlea to Parry, The company subsequently expanded along the Avonlea subdivision into Moose Jaw.

The railway uses a custom built Brandt Road Rail vehicle that was built from the chassis of a Kenworth highway tractor. The rail vehicle is very similar to those used by the Canadian Pacific Railway through their maintenance of way (MOW) department. This vehicle enables the railway to move rolling stock from both rail lines efficiently even though the branch lines are 160 km apart.

The SRCL network connects with two Class I railways. At Moose Jaw SRCL connects with Canadian National, servicing stations at Truax, Avonlea, Briercrest and Tilney; while the Colony subdivision connects to the Fife Lake Railway (operated by the Great Western Railway) at Rockglen. Once the producer grain cars arrive in Assinaboia, they are interchanged onto the Canadian Pacific Railway.

== See also ==
- Battle River Railway
