= Galilee, Saskatchewan =

Community in Saskatchewan, Canada

Coordinates: 49.950°N 105.555°W

Galilee is an unincorporated community in Terrell Rural Municipality No. 101, Saskatchewan, Canada. The community is located on Highway 36 about 50 km south of the city of Moose Jaw. Very little remains of the community other than an old general store and a private residence. It is thus regularly described as a ghost town by travellers.

Galilee is on the western edge of the Dirt Hills.

== See also ==
- List of communities in Saskatchewan
- List of ghost towns in Saskatchewan
