= Scobey–Coronach Border Crossing =

Border crossing between Canada and the United States

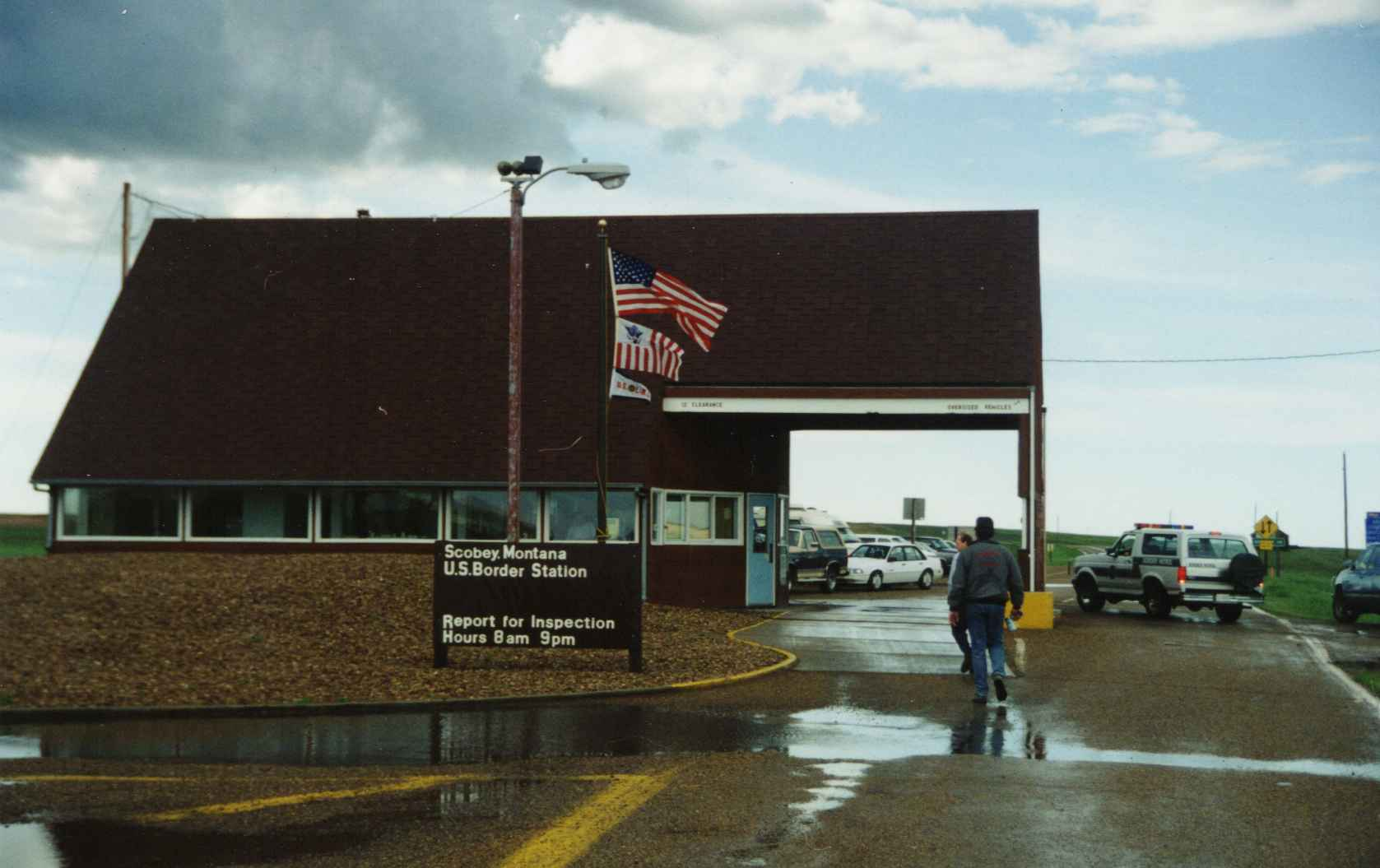
- US Border Inspection Station at Scobey, Montana as seen in 1995

Locaiton
- Country: United States; Canada
- Location: MT 13 / Highway 36; US Port: 1440 Hwy 13 North, Scobey, MT 59263-9514; Canadian Port: Highway 36, Coronach SK S0H 0Z0
- Coordinates: 49°00′00″N 105°24′28″W

Details
- Opened: 1914

Website
- US Canadian

The Scobey–Coronach Border Crossing connects the towns of Scobey, Montana and Coronach, Saskatchewan on the Canada–US border. Montana Highway 13 on the American side joins Saskatchewan Highway 36 on the Canadian side. An airport with a grass runway that straddles the border is located on the east side of this crossing.

== Canadian side ==
Formerly called "East Poplar River", the Coronach border station was established in 1914 under the administrative oversight of the Port of Moose Jaw. In 1917/18, a combined residence and customs office was erected. The Canadian border station was upgraded in 1958, 1981 and 2014.

== US side ==
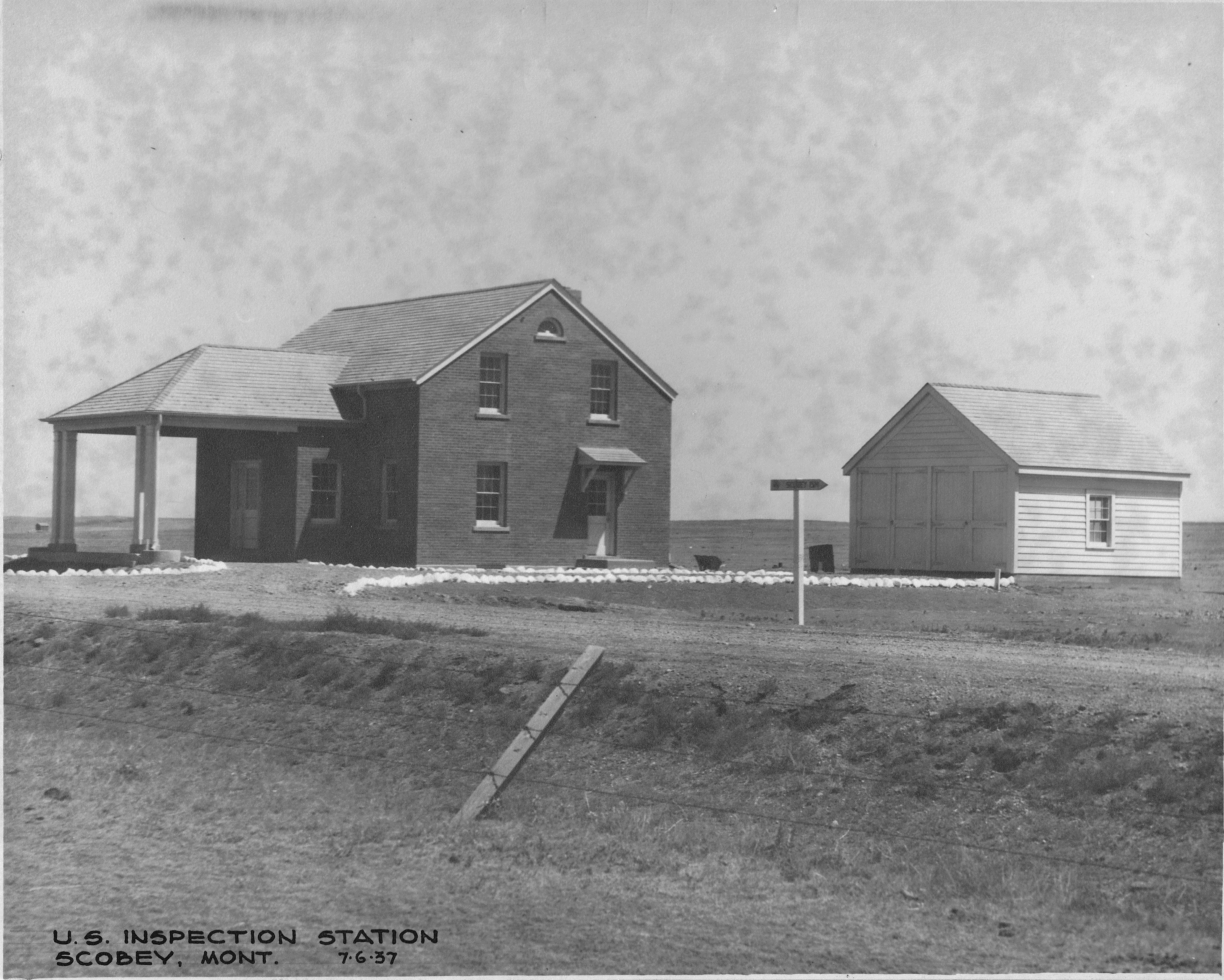
Scobey MT border station as seen in 1937.

In 1924, a border patrol station was established as a sub-office with Plentywood Station. In 1937, a brick inspection station at the Canadian border was established on the east side of the roadway. It was replaced in the 1970s with a wood frame construction in the median of the roadway. In 2007, a new facility was constructed on the west side of the roadway that supports both CBP and Border Patrol.

In 2019, the new hours of 9am to 7pm year round were a reduction from 13 hours a day to 10.

== Biometric System ==
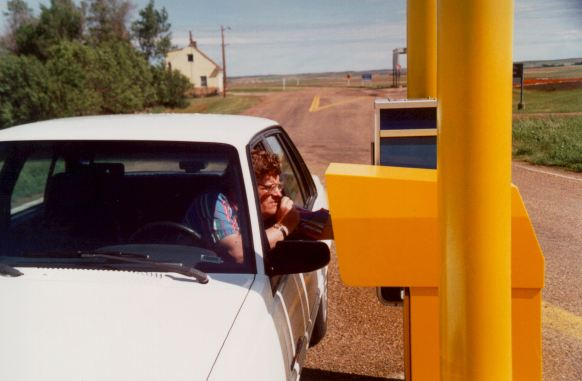
Traveler using the speaker recognition system to enter the US at Scobey Montana in 1996.

In 1996, this border crossing became the world's first fully automated port of entry, using biometrics to confirm the identity of travelers. The US and Canadian governments engaged in a cooperative prototype project to enable certain trusted individuals with nothing to declare to cross the border in either direction after the port had closed for the night. Local residents who were enrolled could use a speaker verification system to open the gates and enter the country without inspection. This system was replaced with a Remote Video Inspection System in 1998, which was decommissioned after the September 11 attacks of 2001.

== See also ==
- List of Canada–United States border crossings
- Coronach/Scobey Border Station Airport
