= Baildon, Saskatchewan =

Unincorporated community in Saskatchewan

Baildon
- Unincorporated community
- Location within Saskatchewan
- Coordinates: 50.274306°N 105.467031°W
- Country: Canada
- Province: Saskatchewan
- Region: Southwest Saskatchewan
- Census division: 7
- Rural Municipality: Baildon

Government
  - Reeve: Sheldon Okerstrom
  - Administrator: Janna Smith
  - Governing body: Baildon No. 131
- Time zone: CST
- Postal code: S6H 7N6
- Area code: 306
- Highways: Highway 2
- Railways: SORA

Baildon is an unincorporated community in Baildon Rural Municipality No. 131, Saskatchewan, Canada. It is located 10 km south of the city of Moose Jaw, about 5 km east of Highway 2 on Township road 154.

== See also ==
- List of communities in Saskatchewan
