= Cardross, Saskatchewan =

Unincorporated hamlet in Saskatchewan, Canada

Cardross
- Unincorporated Hamlet
- Location within Saskatchewan Location within Canada
- Coordinates: 49.816°N 105.617°W
- Country: Canada
- Province: Saskatchewan
- Region: South-central
- Census division: 3
- Rural municipality: Terrell No. 101
- Established: 1910

Government
  - Governing body: Terrell No. 101
  - Reeve: Brian McMillan
  - Administrator: Lacelle Kim

Area
  - Total: 0.00 km^{2} (0 sq mi)

Population (2006)
  - Total: 0
  - Density: 0/km^{2} (0/sq mi)
- Time zone: CST
- Postal code: S0H 0P0
- Area code: 306
- Highways: Range road 274 Township road 102

Cardross, originally named Grace, is an unincorporated hamlet in the Rural Municipality of Terrell No. 101, Saskatchewan, Canada. The hamlet is located approximately 45 kilometres (28 mi) north-east of Assiniboia on Township road 102 and Range road 274.

The Post Office was named Cardross in 1926. It is located at 10-27-W2, prior to 1926 the name was Grace 1910–1926.

== See also ==
- List of communities in Saskatchewan
- List of hamlets in Saskatchewan
