= Avonlea, Harare =

Zimbabwean suburb

Coordinates: 17°45′50″S 31°00′25″E

Avonlea is a residential suburb in northwest Harare. It lies just in the west of Avondale southwest of Emerald Hill, southeast of Marlborough, and north of the greater Mabelreign area. Avonlea is home to approximately 15,600 people.

Avonlea includes the neighborhood of Greencroft and is considered as part of the greater Marlborough postal area with which it also shares its fire and police service with. Lomagundi Road and Avonlea drive serve as the area's main thoroughfares, separating it from Mabelreign and Avondale, respectively. Retail is largely on Colesbury Rd and the sub-neighbourhood of Greencroft.

== History ==
Avonlea was first recognized in the 1920s as a stop on the A2 highway, which is now known as Lomagundi Road. By the second world war the area was home to a middle class British Zimbabwean population along with a lower middle class Irish community particularly on the eastern border with Emerald Hill. In the early 1980s, a number of middle class black Zimbabweans moved to the area and soon formed the majority of the population by the mid nineties.

A sub-neighbourhood of the area is Greencroft which comprises much of the commercial area opposite Avonlea Shopping Centre of Lomagundi Rd.

In 1974, the Avonlea post office relocated to Avonlea Shopping Centre. The community's population diversified after independence as middle class Shona moved in along with the development of the Westgate retail district just to the west.

By the 21st century Avonlea featured a mix of restored homes and post war suburbia. Unlike nearby Westgate and Avondale, Avonlea is a much quieter residential area, however emigration from the area, mostly to the United Kingdom and Australia has depressed property values and development, in contrast to the booming Northeastern suburbs. Despite these changes, the area continues to hang onto its neighborhood flavor and is home to a large community of middle income, Shona people with a smaller white minority.

Avonlea is home to a variety of restaurants, cafes, and shops. Other shopping and retail is present in Greencroft and in the nearby areas of Mabelreign, Bluff Hill and Westgate.

Avonlea Shopping Centre host the bulk of retail in the area with OK Supermarket, various banks, restaurants and doctor's offices.

== Education ==
Residents are zoned to Avonlea Primary School but have the option of attending primary school throughout the city per Zimbabwean standards.

Students who are residents of Avonlea either attend Avonlea or Avondale Primary schools and St Johns, Ellis Robbins or Marlborough High Schools all of which lie outside the neighborhood:

Elementary schools

- Avonlea Primary School

High schools

These schools are not in Avonlea proper but nearby

- Ellis Robbins High School
- St Johns Emerald Hill
- Marlborough High School

== Geography and climate ==
Avonlea is located in the west central suburbs of Harare, along the Zimbabwean Highveld. The community is located at 1489m above sea level.

Avonlea has a highland subtropical climate similar to the nearby Mashonaland East It experiences mild winters, where the winter daily minimum temperatures are mostly above freezing, and summer maximums rarely exceed 32 degrees Celsius.
