= Bailon =

Bailon or Bailón may refer to the following people:

- Bailón Becerra (born 1966), Bolivian cyclist
- Adrienne Bailon (born 1983), American singer-songwriter, recording artist, actress, dancer and television personality
- Aurélie Bailon (born 1987), French rugby union player
- Celestino Bailón Guerrero (born 1954), Mexican politician
- Jaime Bailón (born 1978), Spanish Paralympic swimmer
- Joe Bailon (1923–2017), American car customizer
