= Corinne, Saskatchewan =

Community in Saskatchewan, Canada

Corinne
- Unincorporated community
- Location within Saskatchewan Location within Canada
- Coordinates: 50.049°N 104.627°W
- Country: Canada
- Province: Saskatchewan
- Census division: 6
- Rural municipality: Bratt's Lake No. 129

Government
  - Governing body: Rural Municipality of Bratt's Lake

Area
  - Total: 1.48 km^{2} (0.57 sq mi)
- Time zone: CST
- Area code: 306
- Highways: Hwy 6, CanAm Highway; Hwy 39, Hwy 334

Corinne is an unincorporated community in Rural Municipality of Bratt's Lake No. 129, Saskatchewan, Canada. The community is located at the intersections of Highways 6, 39, and 334 about 11 kilometres (7 mi) northwest of Milestone.

== See also ==
- List of communities in Saskatchewan
