= Push moraine =

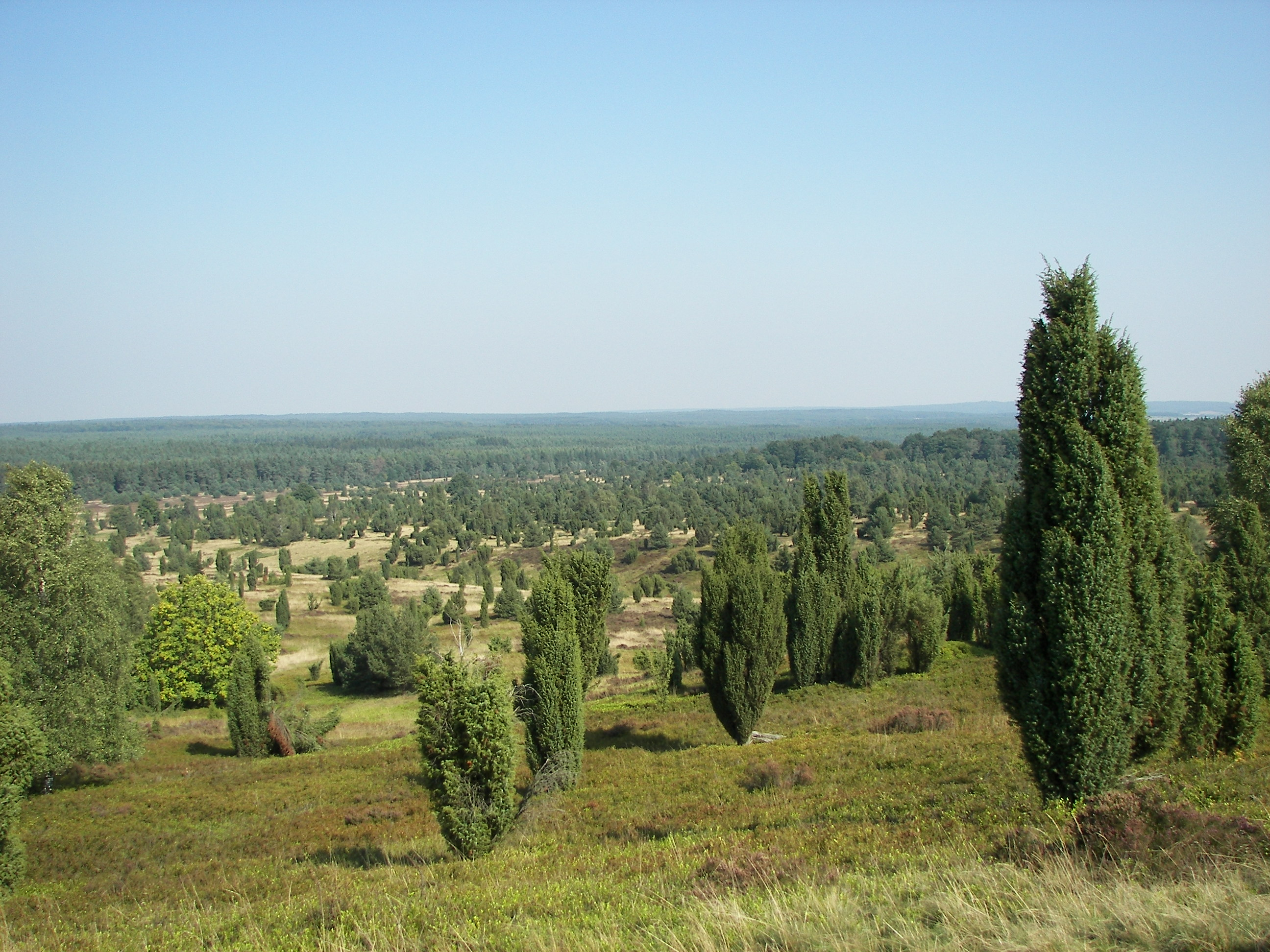
The Lüneburg Heath seen from the Wilseder Berg in northern Germany. The Lüneburg Heath consists of pushed moraines made from Neogene sand deposits. These form nutrient-poor soils and are generally shrublands covered in heaths.

A push moraine or pushed moraine is in geomorphology a moraine (a landform formed by glacial processes) that forms when the terminus advance of a lowland glacier pushes unstratified glacial sediment into a pile or linear ridge in front of it. A push moraine is identified by its ability to push sediment upwards from its original horizontal position. Push moraines are limited in size by the advance of a glacier front and its tendency to shear over the top of any ridge large enough to resist the movement of ice. Pushed moraines generally occur in low, flat plains at higher latitudes and were formed during the glacial stages of the Quaternary ice age. They can be up to 100 km long and several hundreds of metres in height.

Pushed moraines can be found in the North American plains, in Siberia and in Northern Europe. They were formed during cool, glacial stages, when glaciers advanced and covered large parts of North America and Eurasia. In some regions pushed moraines of more than one glacial stage can be recognised, or different generations from a single glacial phase. Since new glacial advances tend to destroy older pushed moraines, most were formed during the last (110,000 to 10,000 years ago) or second-last (238,000 to 128,000 years ago) glacial advances. Today push moraines can be found anywhere an advancing glacier is pushing sediment into a ridge at the terminus.

The largest push moraine in the world is the Dirt Hills in southern Saskatchewan, Canada. The hills are located about 60 kilometres south-east of city of Moose Jaw, along the Missouri Coteau.

== See also ==
- Terminal moraine
