= Avonlea, Saskatchewan =

Village in Saskatchewan, Canada

Avonlea
- Village
- Village of Avonlea
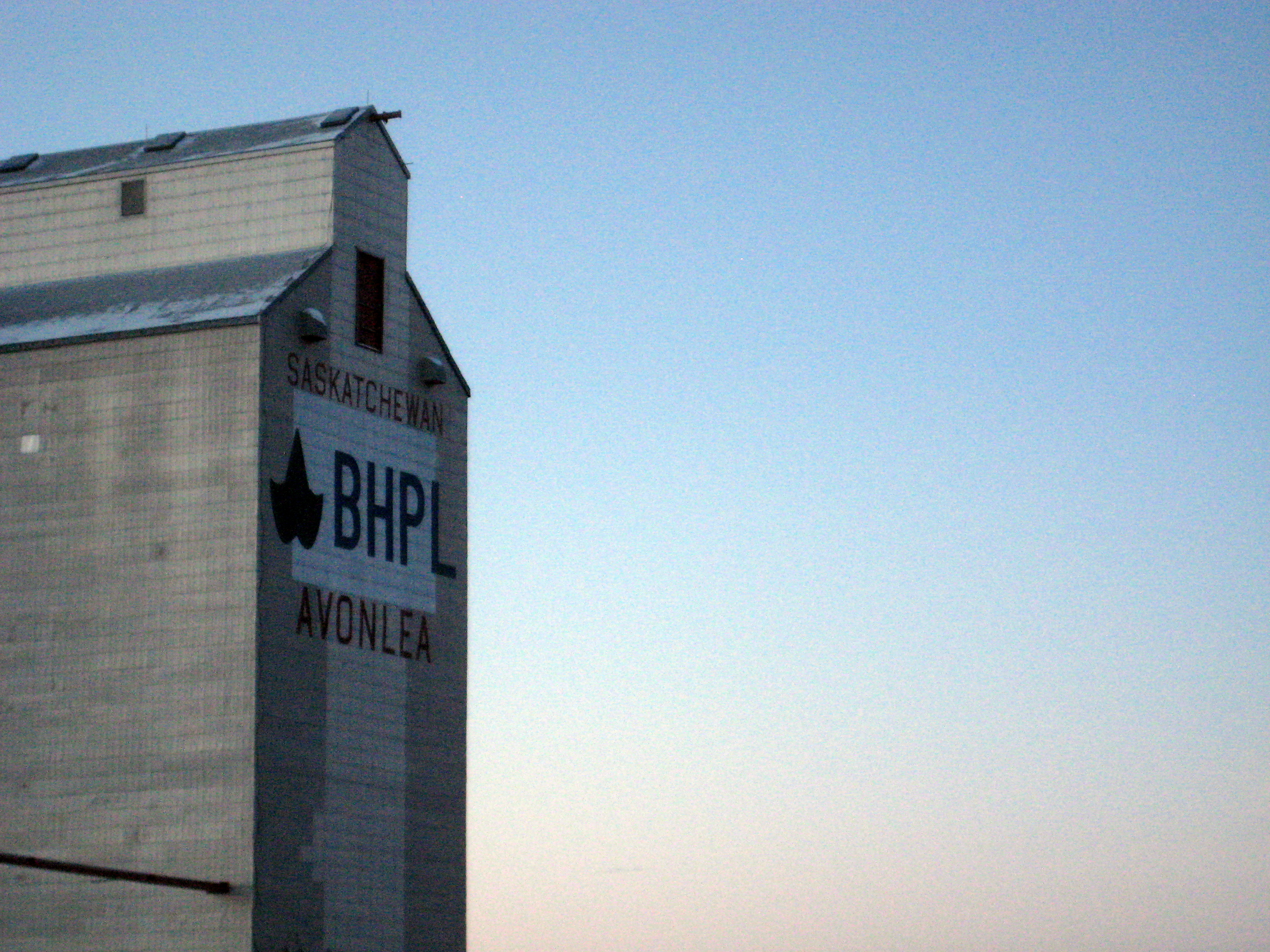
- Avonlea Elevator

- Location of Avonlea in Saskatchewan Avonlea (Canada)
- Coordinates: 50°0′49″N 105°03′38″W
- Country: Canada
- Province: Saskatchewan
- Rural Municipality: Elmsthorpe
- Post office Founded: 1904-08-01

Government
  - Type: Avonlea Village council
  - Mayor: Marlin Stevens
  - Administrator: Tim Forer

Area
  - Total: 0.96 km^{2} (0.37 sq mi)

Population (2011)
  - Total: 398
  - Density: 414.5/km^{2} (1,074/sq mi)
- Time zone: UTC-6 (Central)
- Postal code: S0H 0C0
- Area code: 306
- Highways: Highway 334 / Highway 339
- Website: Official website

Avonlea (2016 population: 393) is a village in the Canadian province of Saskatchewan within the RM of Elmsthorpe No. 100 and Census Division No. 2. The village is approximately 82 kilometres (51 mi) south-west of the city of Regina. The Southern Rails Cooperative maintains its head office in the village.

Along the east side of the village, heading north, is Avonlea Creek. Avonlea Creek is a tributary of the Moose Jaw River and it joins the Moose Jaw River near Rouleau. About 5 kilometres (3.1 mi) south-east of Avonlea, is Avonlea Dam, which was built on Avonlea Creek between 1963 and 1964, creating the Reg Watson Reservoir. The reservoir is the village's only water source.

== History ==
Avonlea incorporated as a village on February 10, 1912. The village was named after the fictional town of Avonlea, Prince Edward Island in Lucy Maud Montgomery's novel Anne of Green Gables. The television series Road to Avonlea is based on the book.

== Parks and attractions ==
Avonlea Heritage Museum houses many artifacts from the area in the train station, and contains an indoor Main Street, agricultural displays as well as murals by accomplished local artist Paul Geraghty.

Avonlea Badlands are four kilometres away to the west on private land. Guided tours are available through the museum.

The picturesque Dirt Hills to the west are home to natural flora and fauna. The Dirt Hills are the largest push moraine in the world.

Dunnet Regional Park, which was named after a local medical doctor, was built and opened on the west side of Reg Watson Reservoir in 1967. The park provides RV parks, camping, fishing, boating, a swimming pool, and eight baseball diamonds. Fish species in the lake include walleye, yellow perch, northern pike, white sucker, and burbot. Walleye are liberally stocked in the lake.

== Sports and recreation ==
Long Creek Golf & Country Club is an 18-hole championship golf course four kilometres east of the village along Avonlea Creek.

Avonlea is home to the Avonlea Arrows of the senior men's Highway Hockey League. The team plays at the village's Avonlea Arena.

== Demographics ==
Population history (1981–2016)
Year	Pop.	±%
1981	442	—
1986	433	−2.0%
1991	405	−6.5%
1996	402	−0.7%
2001	412	+2.5%
2006	381	−7.5%
2011	398	+4.5%
2016	393	−1.3%
Source: Statistics Canada via Saskatchewan Bureau of Statistics

In the 2021 Census of Population conducted by Statistics Canada, Avonlea had a population of 411 living in 174 of its 193 total private dwellings, a change of 4.6% from its 2016 population of 393. With a land area of 1.3 km^{2} (0.50 sq mi), it had a population density of 316.2/km^{2} (818.8/sq mi) in 2021.

In the 2016 Census of Population, the Village of Avonlea recorded a population of 393 living in 172 of its 191 total private dwellings, a −1.3% change from its 2011 population of 398. With a land area of 0.96 km^{2} (0.37 sq mi), it had a population density of 409.4/km^{2} (1,060.3/sq mi) in 2016.

== See also ==
- List of villages in Saskatchewan
- List of communities in Saskatchewan
