= Badon =

Badon may refer to:

- Badon, region in India
- Badon River, Romanian river
- Battle of Badon, 5th century Welsh battle
- Bobby Badon, former Louisiana State Representative
- Hereclean, also known as Badon, Romanian village
