= Rural Municipality of Terrell No. 101 =

Rural municipality in Saskatchewan, Canada

Terrell No. 101
- Rural municipality
- Rural Municipality of Terrell No. 101
- Location of the RM of Terrell No. 101 in Saskatchewan
- Coordinates: 49.913°N 105.487°W
- Country: Canada
- Province: Saskatchewan
- Census division: 3
- SARM division: 2
- Federal riding: Moose Jaw—Lake Centre—Lanigan
- Provincial riding: Lumsden-Morse
- Formed: January 1, 1913

Government
  - Reeve: Darrell Howe
  - Governing body: RM of Terrell No. 101 Council
  - Administrator: Kimberly Sippola
  - Office location: Spring Valley

Area (2016)
  - Land: 864.06 km^{2} (333.62 sq mi)

Population (2016)
  - Total: 241
  - Density: 0.3/km^{2} (0.78/sq mi)
- Time zone: CST
  - Summer (DST): CST
- Postal code: S0H 3X0
- Area codes: 306 and 639

The Rural Municipality of Terrell No. 101 (2016 population: 241) is a rural municipality (RM) in the Canadian province of Saskatchewan within Census Division No. 3 and SARM Division No. 2. It is located in the southwest portion of the province.

== History ==
The RM of Terrell No. 101 incorporated as a rural municipality on January 1, 1913.

== Geography ==
The Dirt Hills are in the RM.

=== Communities and localities ===
The following unincorporated communities are within the RM.

Organized hamlets

- Bayard

Localities

- Cardross
- Crystal Hill
- Galilee
- Spring Valley

== Demographics ==
Population history (1981–2016)
Year	Pop.	±%
1981	457	—
1986	439	−3.9%
1991	380	−13.4%
1996	343	−9.7%
2001	364	+6.1%
2006	257	−29.4%
2011	224	−12.8%
2016	241	+7.6%
Source: Statistics Canada via Saskatchewan Bureau of Statistics

In the 2021 Census of Population conducted by Statistics Canada, the RM of Terrell No. 101 had a population of 210 living in 98 of its 126 total private dwellings, a change of −12.9% from its 2016 population of 241. With a land area of 837.04 km^{2} (323.18 sq mi), it had a population density of 0.3/km^{2} (0.6/sq mi) in 2021.

In the 2016 Census of Population, the RM of Terrell No. 101 recorded a population of 241 living in 103 of its 126 total private dwellings, a 7.6% change from its 2011 population of 224. With a land area of 864.06 km^{2} (333.62 sq mi), it had a population density of 0.3/km^{2} (0.7/sq mi) in 2016.

== Government ==
The RM of Terrell No. 101 is governed by an elected municipal council and an appointed administrator that meets on the second Wednesday of every month. The reeve of the RM is Darrell Howe while its administrator is Kimberly Sippola. The RM's office is located in Spring Valley.

== See also ==
- List of rural municipalities in Saskatchewan
