= Crane Valley, Saskatchewan =

Community in Saskatchewan, Canada

Crane Valley
- Hamlet
- Location within Saskatchewan Location within Canada
- Coordinates: 49°45′24″N 105°31′36″W
- Country: Canada
- Province: Saskatchewan

Area
  - Total: 0.56 km^{2} (0.22 sq mi)

Population (2016)
  - Total: 15
  - Density: 27/km^{2} (69/sq mi)
- Time zone: UTC−6 (Central Standard Time)
- Area codes: 306; 639

Crane Valley is a hamlet in the Canadian province of Saskatchewan.

== Demographics ==
In the 2021 Census of Population conducted by Statistics Canada, Crane Valley had a population of 20 living in 8 of its 9 total private dwellings, a change of 33.3% from its 2016 population of 15. With a land area of 0.52 km^{2} (0.20 sq mi), it had a population density of 38.5/km^{2} (99.6/sq mi) in 2021.
