= Rural Municipality of Baildon No. 131 =

Rural municipality in Saskatchewan, Canada

Baildon No. 131
- Rural municipality
- Rural Municipality of Baildon No. 131
- Location of the RM of Baildon No. 131 in Saskatchewan
- Coordinates: 50.178°N 105.495°W
- Country: Canada
- Province: Saskatchewan
- Census division: 7
- SARM division: 2
- Formed: December 9, 1912

Government
  - Reeve: Charlene Loos
  - Governing body: RM of Baildon No. 131 Council
  - Administrator: Carol Bellefeuille
  - Office location: Moose Jaw

Area (2016)
  - Land: 846.21 km^{2} (326.72 sq mi)

Population (2016)
  - Total: 620
  - Density: 0.7/km^{2} (1.8/sq mi)
- Time zone: CST
  - Summer (DST): CST
- Area codes: 306 and 639

The Rural Municipality of Baildon No. 131 (2016 population: 620) is a rural municipality (RM) in the Canadian province of Saskatchewan within Census Division No. 7 and SARM Division No. 2. It is located in the south-central portion of the province south of Moose Jaw.

== History ==
The RM of Baildon No. 131 incorporated as a rural municipality on December 9, 1912.

== Geography ==
The Cactus Hills are in the RM.

=== Communities and localities ===
The following communities are located in the RM.

- Archive
- Baildon
- Buttress
- Crestwynd
- Leakville
- Levuka
- Tilney

== Demographics ==
Population history (1981–2016)
Year	Pop.	±%
1981	799	—
1986	797	−0.3%
1991	679	−14.8%
1996	694	+2.2%
2001	631	−9.1%
2006	548	−13.2%
2011	594	+8.4%
2016	620	+4.4%
Source: Statistics Canada via Saskatchewan Bureau of Statistics

In the 2021 Census of Population conducted by Statistics Canada, the RM of Baildon No. 131 had a population of 583 living in 182 of its 208 total private dwellings, a change of −6% from its 2016 population of 620. With a land area of 829.56 km^{2} (320.29 sq mi), it had a population density of 0.7/km^{2} (1.8/sq mi) in 2021.

In the 2016 Census of Population, the RM of Baildon No. 131 recorded a population of 620 living in 201 of its 219 total private dwellings, a 4.4% change from its 2011 population of 594. With a land area of 846.21 km^{2} (326.72 sq mi), it had a population density of 0.7/km^{2} (1.9/sq mi) in 2016.

== Attractions ==
- Sukanen Ship Pioneer Village and Museum
  - The Diefenbaker House is the childhood home of Prime Minister of Canada, John Diefenbaker-turned-museum located in the city of Prince Albert. The museum building was built in 1912 and purchased in 1947 by the Prime Minister of Canada, John Diefenbaker and his then wife Edna Diefenbaker. It was closed in 2001 and moved to the Sukanen Ship and Pioneer Museum in 2004.

== Government ==
The RM of Baildon No. 131 is governed by an elected municipal council and an appointed administrator that meets on the second Wednesday of every month. The reeve of the RM is Charlene Loos while its administrator is Carol Bellefeuille. The RM's office is located in Moose Jaw.

== See also ==
- List of rural municipalities in Saskatchewan
- List of communities in Saskatchewan
