= Avonlea Creek =

River in Saskatchewan, Canada

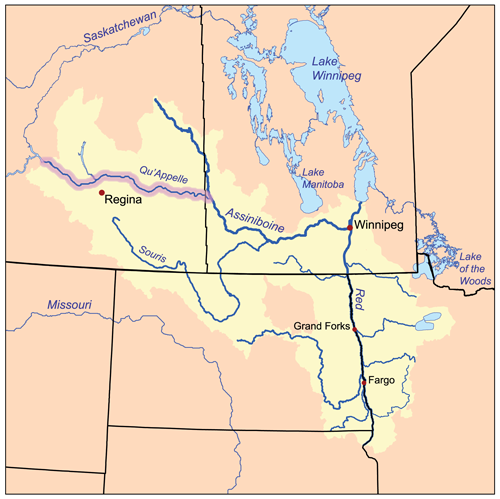
- The Red River drainage basin, with the Qu'Appelle River highlighted

- Location in Saskatchewan Avonlea Creek (Canada)

Location
- Country: Canada
- Provinces: Saskatchewan

Physical characteristics
- Source: Piapot Cree First Nation 75G
  - coordinates: 49°45′47″N 104°40′15″W
  - elevation: 640 m (2,100 ft)
- Mouth: Moose Jaw River
  - location: 4 miles south-west of Rouleau
  - coordinates: 50°9′0″N 104°57′2″W

Basin features
- River system: Red River

Avonlea Creek is a river in the southern part of the Canadian province of Saskatchewan. It is in a region called the Prairie Pothole Region of North America, which extends throughout three Canadian provinces and five U.S. states. It is also within Palliser's Triangle and the Great Plains ecoregion. Avonlea Creek is a main tributary of the Moose Jaw River, which is part of the Upper Qu'Appelle Watershed and the Hudson Bay drainage basin.

== River's course ==
Avonlea Creek begins at Piapot Cree First Nation 75G, about 5 kilometres (3.1 mi) south-east of the intersection of Highway 6 and Highway 712. From there, it travels in a north-westerly direction past Parry, paralleling the Moose Jaw River until it empties into the Watson Reservoir, south-east of the village of Avonlea. From the reservoir, the river heads north until it meets the Moose Jaw River near Rouleau.

The headwaters of the river are in the Missouri Coteau and The Dirt Hills to the west are the source of several tributaries.

== Watson Reservoir ==
Reg Watson Reservoir, also known as Avonlea Reservoir (49.9778°N 104.9964°W), was created with the building of Avonlea Dam between 1963 and 1964 across Avonlea Creek. The dam was originally built by the Prairie Farm Rehabilitation Administration and is now operated by the Saskatchewan Water Security Agency. The dam is 16.6 metres (54 ft) high and the reservoir holds 7,400 dam^{3} (6,000 acre⋅ft) of water and has a surface area of 201.5 hectares (498 acres). It is about 5 kilometres (3.1 mi) south-east of Avonlea and is the source of water for the village. The dam was upgraded in 2003.

The reservoir is stocked every second year with fish. Northern pike, walleye, burbot, and yellow perch are found in the lake and there are several boat launches around the lake for access.

== Dunnet Regional Park ==
Dunnet Regional Park (49.9931°N 105.0115°W), built in 1967, is a regional park located on the west side of Reg Watson Reservoir. It was named after a local medical doctor. The park consists of 50 acres in a naturally treed valley and features RV parking, camping, fishing, boating, mini golf, a heated swimming pool, and eight baseball diamonds.

To the north of the park, along the west bank of Avonlea Creek, is an 18-hole championship golf course called Long Creek Golf & Country Club.

== See also ==
- List of rivers of Saskatchewan
- List of lakes of Saskatchewan
- Saskatchewan Water Security Agency
- List of dams and reservoirs in Canada
- Hudson Bay drainage basin
