= Truax, Saskatchewan =

Community in Saskatchewan, Canada

Truax Schuett and Schuettville
- Unincorporated community
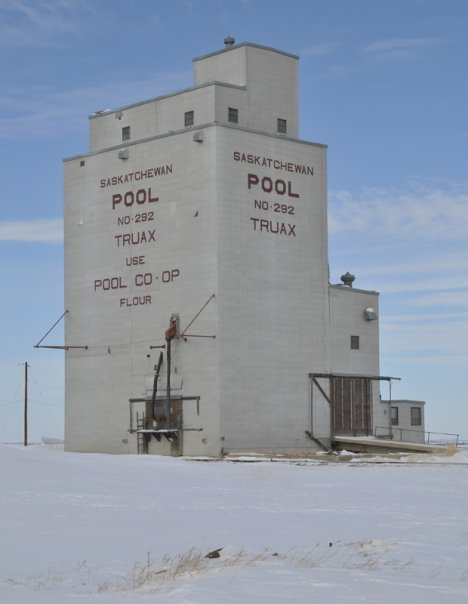
- Grain elevator, built in 1964

- Location of Truax in Saskatchewan Truax (Canada)
- Coordinates: 49°54′N 104°57′W
- Country: Canada
- Province: Saskatchewan
- Region: Saskatchewan
- Rural municipality: Elmsthorpe No. 100
- Post office Founded: 1907-07-01
- Incorporated (village): September 9, 1912
- Dissolved: December 30, 1970

Population
- 12
- Time zone: CST
- Postal code: S0H 4A0
- Area code: 306

Truax is an unincorporated community in the Rural Municipality of Elmsthorpe No. 100, Saskatchewan, Canada. It held village status prior to December 30, 1970. Truax is located 80 kilometres (50 mi) southwest of Regina and approximately 75 kilometres (47 mi) southeast of Moose Jaw on Highway 623.

== History ==
Truax was incorporated as a village on September 9, 1912. Originally named Schuett in honour of an early homesteading family, it was re-named Truax in celebration of Reuben Eldridge Truax, an Ontario businessman and politician.

Truax's first overseer (mayor) was F.A. Bennett and the first secretary-treasurer was Joseph Duck.

Until the early 1920s, the municipal office, village office, Bank of Hamilton, and fire hall were housed in one building. This building burned in February 1923, causing the loss of most of the early records of Truax.

Truax is situated almost equidistant between Radville and Moose Jaw on the Canadian National Railway line that was closed by CN in the late 1980s. Southern Rails Cooperative, a farmer-owned cooperative, took over operation of the line, and it still operates today, with farmers loading their grain directly into rail cars, bypassing the grain companies, and shipping directly to port. The rail line terminates at the Truax grain elevator, built in 1964 and now given Saskatchewan Heritage status.

At its peak, Truax had a lumberyard, a gas station, a hardware store, a school, an indoor rink and a curling rink, and two churches (Anglican and Roman Catholic).

Truax was reverted to hamlet status on December 31, 1970, and came under the jurisdiction of the Rural Municipality of Elmsthorpe No. 100 in 2002.

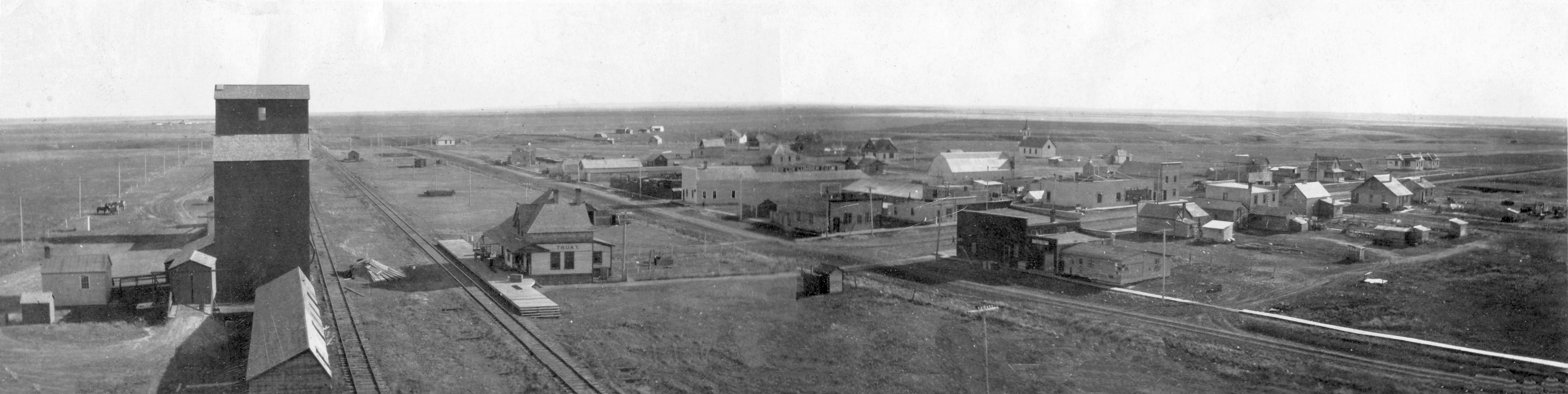
Truax in 1920

== See also ==
- List of communities in Saskatchewan
