= Moose Jaw River =

River in Saskatchewan, Canada

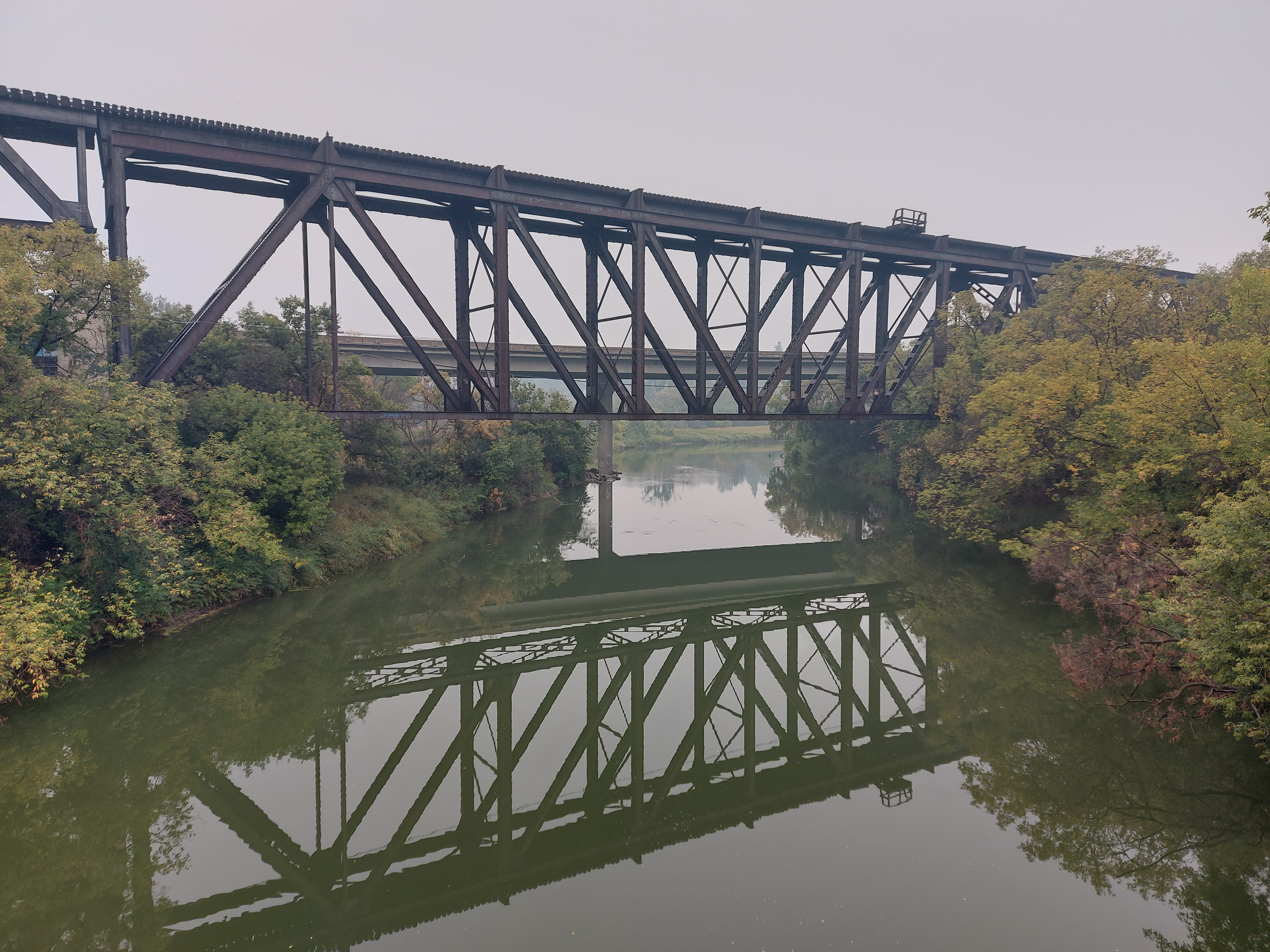
- Moose Jaw River

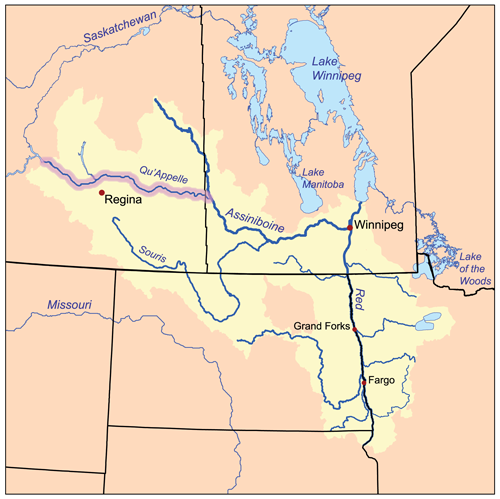
- The Red River drainage basin, with the Qu'Appelle River highlighted

- Location of mouth in Saskatchewan Moose Jaw River (Canada)

Location
- Country: Canada
- Provinces: Saskatchewan

Physical characteristics
- Source: Ibsen Lake
  - coordinates: 49°47′0″N 104°15′22″W
  - elevation: 575 m (1,886 ft)
- Mouth: Qu'Appelle River
  - location: Buffalo Pound Provincial Park
  - coordinates: 50.5679°N 105.2949°W
- Basin size: 9,360 km^{2} (3,610 sq mi)

Basin features
- River system: Red River drainage basin
- Tributaries
  - left: Avonlea Creek; Thunder Creek

Moose Jaw River is a river in the Canadian province of Saskatchewan. It is located in the southern part of the province in a region called the Prairie Pothole Region of North America, which extends throughout three Canadian provinces and five U.S. states. It is also within Palliser's Triangle and the Great Plains ecoregion.

The Moose Jaw River drainage basin is one of five sub-basins that make up the Upper Qu'Appelle Watershed. Craven Dam at the village of Craven is the dividing point between the upper and lower watersheds of the Qu'Appelle River. The river and its tributaries drain a total of 9,360 square kilometres (3,610 sq mi). The total combined drainage area for the five sub-basins of the Upper Qu'Appelle Watershed is 23,443 square kilometres (9,051 sq mi). The Qu'Appelle River system is part of the much larger Hudson Bay drainage basin.

== Course ==
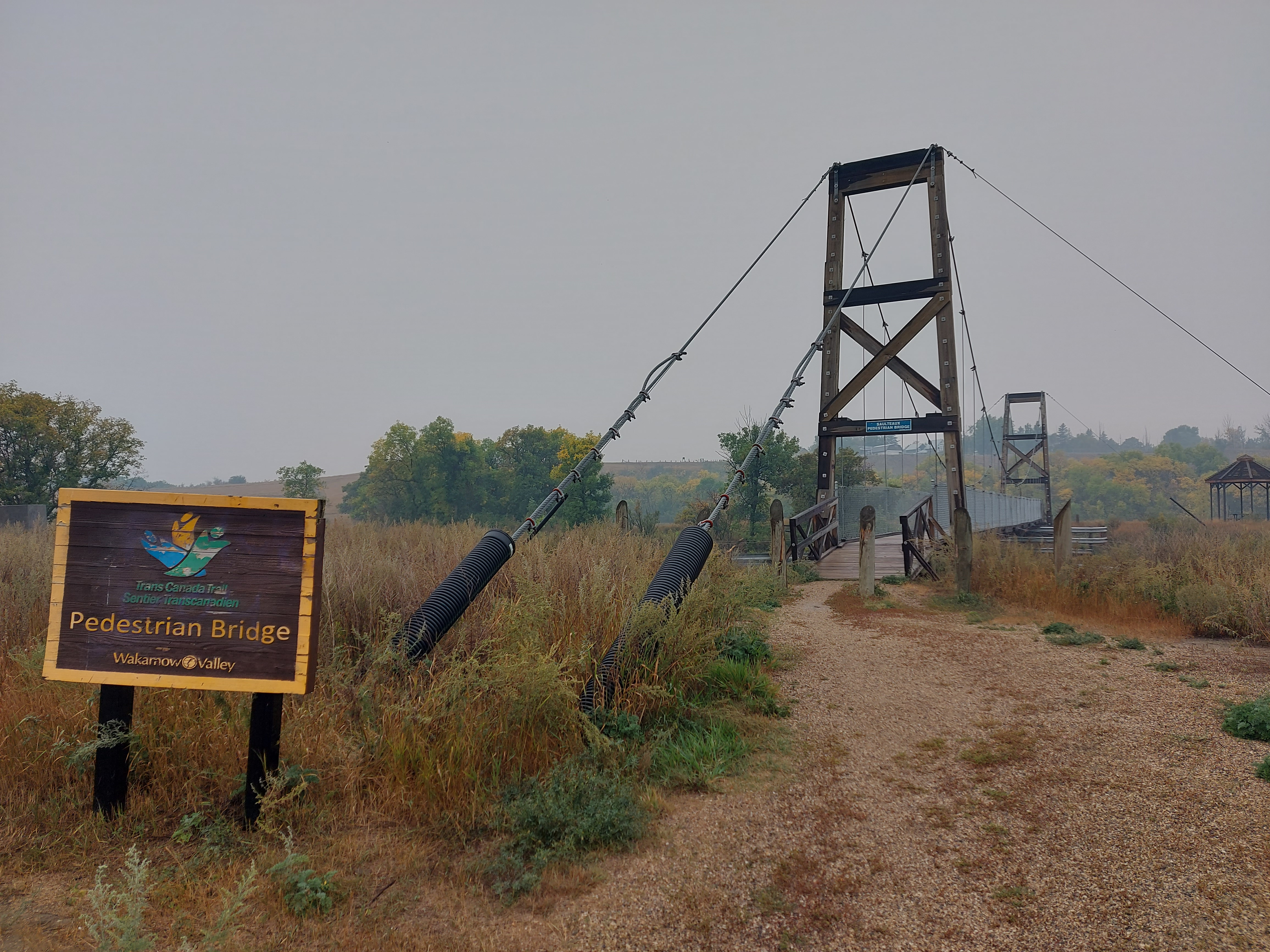
Pedestrian Bridge in Wakamow Park; it is part of the Trans Canada Trail

The source of the Moose Jaw River is Ibsen Lake, which is about 6.4 kilometres (4.0 mi) west of Yellow Grass. From there, the river travels in a north-westerly direction following Highway 39 most of the way to the city of Moose Jaw. As the river approaches the city, it crosses Highway 339, Stelcam Weir (50.2722°N 105.3052°W), Five Mile Dam (50.3275°N 105.5071°W), and Highway 2 before entering Wakamow Valley Park. In the valley, the river meets Thunder Creek and then snakes its way along the southern part of the city. At the south-east corner of Moose Jaw is the Kingsway Dam.

The Kingsway Dam (50.3893°N 105.5019°W), which is owned and operated by the Saskatchewan Water Security Agency, is 5 metres (16 ft) high and was built in 1948. It helps control water flows along the Moose Jaw River and creates a 160-hectare (400-acre) reservoir in Wakamow Valley Park. Upgrades were done to the dam in 1985 and, after unprecedented flooding in 2010 and 2011, significant repairs were completed.

From the dam, the river heads east and then north where it meets the Qu'Appelle River about 3.2 kilometres (2.0 mi) east and downstream of Buffalo Pound Lake in the Nicolle Flats Marsh at the eastern end of Buffalo Pound Provincial Park. Several highways cross the river's path, including Highways 6, 334, 623, 339, 2, 1, and 301.

== Tributaries ==
There are two main tributaries of the Moose Jaw River. Avonlea Creek begins near the Piapot Cree First Nation 75G and flows in a north-west direction paralleling Moose Jaw River until near the village of Avonlea where it turns north and meets Moose Jaw River about 6.4 kilometres (4.0 mi) south-west of Rouleau. Along the course of Avonlea Creek is Watson Reservoir, which is about 6.4 kilometres (4.0 mi) south-east of the town of Avonlea. At the north end of the reservoir is Dunnet Regional Park.

The other main tributary is Thunder Creek. Thunder Creek begins near Lake Diefenbaker and travels in a south-easterly direction and meets up with the Moose Jaw River in the city of Moose Jaw. There are four shallow, marshy lakes, Paysen (Horfield), Kettlehut, Williams, and Pelican along Thunder Creek's course and four main tributaries, Allin Creek, Aquadell Creek, Sandy Creek, and Wilson Creek.

== See also ==
- List of rivers of Saskatchewan
- Hudson Bay drainage basin
