= Rural Municipality of Elmsthorpe No. 100 =

Rural municipality in Saskatchewan, Canada

Elmsthorpe No. 100
- Rural municipality
- Rural Municipality of Elmsthorpe No. 100
- Location of the RM of Elmsthorpe No. 100 in Saskatchewan
- Coordinates: 49.892°N 105.025°W
- Country: Canada
- Province: Saskatchewan
- Census division: 2
- SARM division: 2
- Federal riding: Moose Jaw—Lake Centre—Lanigan
- Provincial riding: Lumsden-Morse; Weyburn-Big Muddy
- Formed: December 12, 1910

Government
  - Reeve: Ken Miller
  - Governing body: RM of Elmsthorpe No. 100 Council
  - Administrator: Jaimie Paranuik
  - Office location: Avonlea

Area (2016)
  - Land: 843.12 km^{2} (325.53 sq mi)

Population (2016)
  - Total: 226
  - Density: 0.3/km^{2} (0.78/sq mi)
- Time zone: CST
  - Summer (DST): CST
- Postal code: S0H 0C0
- Area codes: 306 and 639

The Rural Municipality of Elmsthorpe No. 100 (2016 population: 226) is a rural municipality (RM) in the Canadian province of Saskatchewan within Census Division No. 2 and SARM Division No. 2. It is located in the southeast portion of the province.

== History ==
The RM of Elmsthorpe No. 100 was incorporated as a rural municipality on December 12, 1910.

=== Heritage properties ===
There are four historical properties located within the RM.

- Claybank Brick Plant - Constructed in 1912 - 1914, and located within Claybank the plant is now a national historic site. The plant previously operated under the name Saskatchewan Clay Products; Dominion Fire Brick and Pottery Company; Dominion Fire Brick and Clay Products Ltd.; A.P. Green Refectories Ltd.
- Crystal Hill School (now called the Crystal Hill Community Centre) - Constructed in 1930 as a one-room school the building served as a school from 1930 until 1954. The building is based on a Waterman-Waterbury Company design.
- Saskatchewan Wheat Pool Elevator #292 - Constructed in 1964, and located within the hamlet of Truax.
- St. Joseph's Roman Catholic Church - Constructed in 1928, and located within the hamlet of Claybank.

== Geography ==
Geographical features in the RM include the Dirt Hills, Watson Reservoir, Avonlea Badlands, and Avonlea Creek.

=== Communities and localities ===
The following urban municipalities are surrounded by the RM.

Villages

- Avonlea

The following unincorporated communities are within the RM.

Organized hamlets

- Claybank

Localities

- Gravelbourg Junction
- Truax (dissolved as a village, December 30, 1970)

== Demographics ==
Population history (1981–2016)
| Year | Pop. | ±% |
|---|---|---|
| 1981 | 496 | — |
| 1986 | 441 | −11.1% |
| 1991 | 405 | −8.2% |
| 1996 | 328 | −19.0% |
| 2001 | 320 | −2.4% |
| 2006 | 258 | −19.4% |
| 2011 | 210 | −18.6% |
| 2016 | 226 | +7.6% |
Source: Statistics Canada via Saskatchewan Bureau of Statistics

In the 2021 Census of Population conducted by Statistics Canada, the RM of Elmsthorpe No. 100 had a population of 195 living in 92 of its 112 total private dwellings, a change of −13.7% from its 2016 population of 226. With a land area of 824.15 km^{2} (318.21 sq mi), it had a population density of 0.2/km^{2} (0.6/sq mi) in 2021.

In the 2016 Census of Population, the RM of Elmsthorpe No. 100 recorded a population of 226 living in 98 of its 115 total private dwellings, a 7.6% change from its 2011 population of 210. With a land area of 843.12 km^{2} (325.53 sq mi), it had a population density of 0.3/km^{2} (0.7/sq mi) in 2016.

== Economy ==
Agriculture is its major industry.

== Government ==
The RM of Elmsthorpe No. 100 is governed by an elected municipal council and an appointed administrator that meets on the first Wednesday of every month. The reeve of the RM is Ken Miller while its administrator is Jaimie Paranuik. The RM's office is located in Avonlea.
