= Parry, Saskatchewan =

Coordinates: 49°47′19″N 104°43′14″W

Parry is a hamlet in the Canadian province of Saskatchewan.

Parry is believed to be named after Sir William Edward Parry. He was a Royal Navy officer who carried out several voyages in a hunt for the North-West Passage.

People relocated to the area around 1905. Some came from the United States. Others were British, Danish, and German. The Krauss family started a post office and store in 1907. In 1911 Canadian Northern Railway was laid, creating the townsite. By 1912 several businesses were established. The Saskatchewan Co-operative Elevator Company constructed a grain elevator in 1911. It was bought by the Saskatchewan Wheat Pool in 1926. It later became an annex when the Pool erected a new elevator in 1966. It closed in 2000. Reliance Grain Company built an elevator in 1912. It changed hands a couple times before becoming a Pool elevator in 1948. It then merged with the other Pool elevator in 1954. The first school in Parry opened September 30th, 1913. Parry had a hardware store, livery, gas pump, pool room, blacksmith, restaurant, and a train depot by 1916. One source states that Parry had about two hundred residents at this time.

In 1953 a United Church, from south of Weyburn, was moved into Parry. A curling rink was constructed the same year. The joint recreation centre and bowling alley opened in 1977. The original school closed in 1956. It ended up being replaced by a new one.

The community’s unfortunate decline began in the 1960s. Parry’s population plummeted from one-hundred and twenty residents to around seventy between the late 1960s and early 1970s. Grade 10 – 12 students were sent to Pangman for their schooling. The Parry school closed in the late 1970s. The railroad from Parry to Radville was abandoned by Canadian National also in the late 1970s. The line north to Moose Jaw was bought by Southern Rails Cooperative in 1989. Part of this section was damaged by a storm in 1999 and never repaired. In 1975 the curling rink and station depot were torn down. Forty-some people lived in Parry in 1980. By 2006 its population was 18.

== Demographics ==
In the 2021 Census of Population conducted by Statistics Canada, Parry had a population of 15 living in 5 of its 8 total private dwellings, a change of 0% from its 2016 population of 15. With a land area of 0.24 km^{2} (0.093 sq mi), it had a population density of 62.5/km^{2} (161.9/sq mi) in 2021.
