= The Dirt Hills =

Hills in Saskatchewan, Canada

- Location within Saskatchewan Location within Canada

Highest point
- Elevation: 880 m (2,890 ft)
- Coordinates: 49°59′39″N 105°11′18″W

Geography
- Location: Missouri Coteau, Saskatchewan, Canada

The Dirt Hills and neighbouring Cactus Hills are an arcuate moraine and the largest glacial push in the world. The hills were formed during the deglaciation of the last ice age over 10,000 years ago. They are located in the southern region of the Canadian province of Saskatchewan, east of Old Wives Lake and about 60 kilometres (37 mi) south-east of Moose Jaw and are part of the Bearpaw Formation within Palliser's Triangle and the Great Plains ecoregion.

As the last ice age was ending, there was a lot of glacial movement and the compressive flow of the ice sheet forced the glaciers to re-advance up the Missouri Coteau escarpment. The advancing ice sheet acted like a bulldozer pushing, moving, and uplifting earth until in ran into the upward slope of the escarpment. The Dirt Hills are composed mostly of bedrock and drift that was stacked up to form a single block 215 metres (705 ft) thick where the ice sheet ended its advance.

The moraine has an area of almost 1,000 square kilometres (390 sq mi) with a height of 880 metres (2,890 ft) above sea level. The Dirt and Cactus Hills form an amphitheatre-shaped landform. The north-western side of the amphitheatre-shaped moraine is called the Cactus Hills and the eastern and southern portion is The Dirt Hills. During the deglaciation of that last ice age, there was a glacial sub-lobe, also known as a tongue, between the hills named Spring Valley ice tongue. It is named after the community of Spring Valley that sits at the head of where the ice tongue was. The Dirt Hills are 7.5 kilometres (4.7 mi) wide, 40 kilometres (25 mi) long, and rise 120 metres (390 ft) above the surrounding prairie. They stretch from Claybank in the east to Galilee in the west. The Cactus Hills rise to a height of 737 metres (2,418 ft) above sea level.

== History ==
Evidence of First Nations living among the hills is shown by teepee rings and burial markers throughout the hills. About 1 kilometre (0.62 mi) away from the Avonlea Badlands at the eastern end of The Dirt Hills, is a buffalo jump. The 1874 March West by the North-West Mounted Police passed by the hills on the way to Fort Macleod, North-West Territories (in modern-day Southern Alberta).

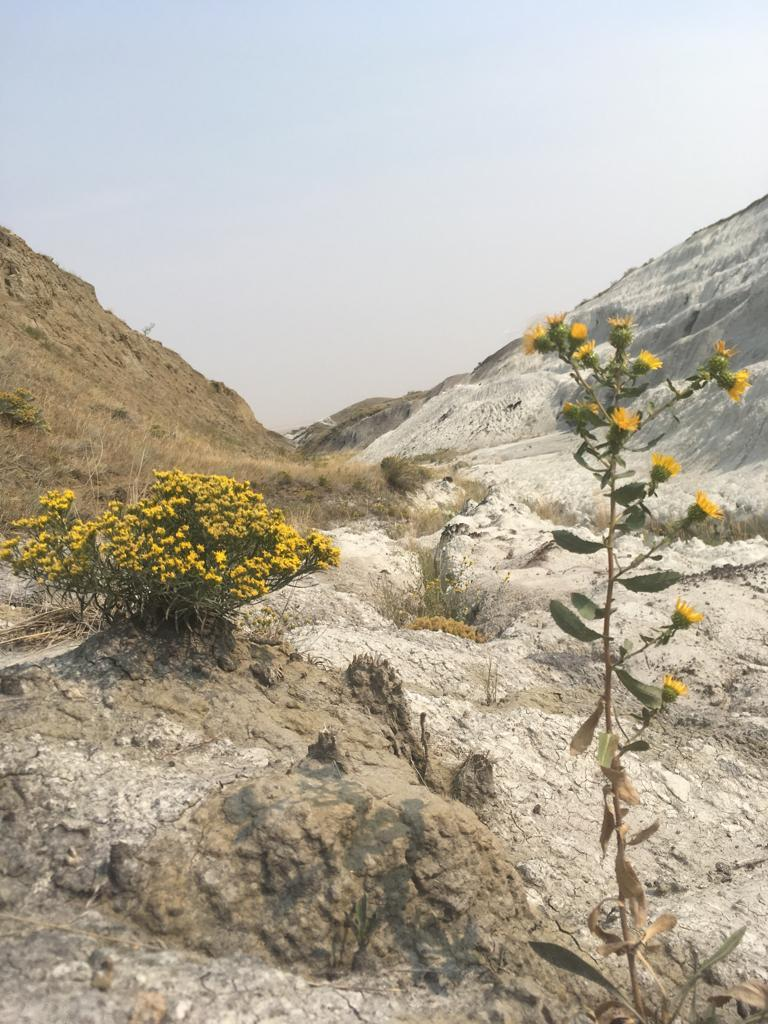
Massold Clay Canyons, north-east area of the Dirt Hills

In 1886 Thomas McWilliams, a homesteader from the Moose Jaw River area, discovered clay at the north-east corner of The Dirt Hills while out looking for lost cattle and picking Saskatoon berries. Recognising the value of this clay, he travelled to Moose Jaw to the land titles office to lay claim to the clay-rick land. He later moved his family to the new homestead. Near the same time, he sought permission from the federal government to mine the refractory clay on his land. This is the first official record of the Claybank clay. By 1914 a brick plant was built and bricks from the area were being sold around Canada and the United States. Now the site is a National Historic Site called Claybank Brick Plant.

In 2001, the Claybank Brick Plant and Historical Society bought 256 acres of the adjacent Massold Clay Canyons from Saskatchewan Environment and Resource Management to create a protected historic and wildlife area.

== Avonlea Badlands ==
The Avonlea Badlands are located about 4 kilometres (2.5 mi) west of the village of Avonlea at the easternmost edge of The Dirt Hills, south-east of Claybank near Highway 339. The total area of the badlands is about 1 square kilometre (0.39 sq mi). Millions of years ago, much of Saskatchewan was covered in an inland sea. Sedimentary deposits from this sea can be seen in the layers in the badlands. The first Avonlea Arrowhead was found at these badlands during an excavation.

The badlands are on private property and only open to the public through guided tours.

== Communities ==
The Dirt Hills and Cactus Hills are sparsely populated. Three rural municipalities encompass the hills, including Elmsthorpe No. 100, Terrell No. 101, and Baildon No. 131. Communities in the hills include Claybank, Bayard, Spring Valley, and Galilee.

== Transportation ==
The following is a list of highways and airports throughout The Dirt and Cactus Hills:

- Highway 36 skirts the western edge of The Dirt and Cactus Hills
- Highway 339 passes by the north-east corner of The Dirt Hills, running by the Avonlea Badlands, Claybank Brick Plant, and Claybank
- Highway 624 runs south from Spring Valley
- Highway 715 runs the length of The Dirt Hills from Highway 36 at Galilee to Claybank and Highway 339
- Spring Valley (North) Airport is about 8 miles north of Spring Valley in the RM of Baildon No. 131 along Highway 715

== See also ==
- List of mountains of Saskatchewan
- Geology of Saskatchewan
- Geography of Saskatchewan
