= Spring Valley, Saskatchewan =

Former village in Saskatchewan, Canada

Coordinates: 49°56′37″N 105°24′11″W

Location of Spring Valley in Saskatchewan

Spring Valley is a hamlet in Terrell Rural Municipality No. 101 in the province of Saskatchewan, Canada. Located at the end of highway 715, and approximately 62 km south of the city of Moose Jaw.

Spring Valley is located in a landform called the Dirt Hills, which were formed about 10,000 years ago at the end of the last ice age. The Dirt Hills, combined with the nearby Cactus Hills, are shaped like an amphitheatre and in the centre of that amphitheatre during the last ice age was a glacial sub-lobe, also known as a glacial tongue, named Spring Valley ice tongue. It was named after the community of Spring Valley.

== Population ==
Prior to January 16, 1991, Spring Valley was a village, but it was restructured as a hamlet on that date. The population at that time was 16.

=== Demographics ===
Canada census – Spring Valley, Saskatchewan community profile

Population
Land area
Population density
Median age
Private dwellings
Median household income

== See also ==
- List of communities in Saskatchewan
- List of hamlets in Saskatchewan
