= Kayville =

Community in Saskatchewan, Canada

Coordinates: 49°43′33″N 105°09′01″W

Kayville is a hamlet in the Canadian province of Saskatchewan.

== History ==
In 1905, Romanian settlers, seeking free government land under the Dominion Lands Act, founded Kayville. The name Kayville comes from Billie McKay. He named the community by taking the "Kay" from his last name and adding "ville". Settlers began to build in Kayville around Main Street and homesteads outside the community. The first homesteads were built in 1906 and the homesteaders consisted of farmers and ranchers. Around 1912–1913, Kayville was big enough to maintain a post office, and a school was established. The community boomed with the arrival of the Canadian Pacific Railway in 1924.

Kayville became a thriving agricultural based community, large enough to become an organized hamlet by 1951. In 1970 the community's population reached over 100 citizens. Although the population has dropped drastically to a mere 10 residents, residents from Regina and surrounding cities have realized the potential Kayville has to offer, because of its proximity to the city, and have started buying land in and around Kayville bringing hope for a better and prosperous future.

== Demographics ==
In the 2021 Census of Population conducted by Statistics Canada, Kayville had a population of 10 living in 7 of its 8 total private dwellings, a change of 0% from its 2016 population of 10. With a land area of 0.36 km^{2} (0.14 sq mi), it had a population density of 27.8/km^{2} (71.9/sq mi) in 2021.

== Services ==
The swimming pool and community centre complex was built in 1984 and was used for many community functions. Kayville once had a variety of businesses, but due to the decline of population in the 1980-90s, Kayville now only has a post office. The Kayville Credit Union was open every Wednesday until September, 2016.

St. Peter and Paul Church has been restored and still holds services every Sunday. The church was built in 1908 by the Romanian settlers. It has played a large role in Kayville's history and has been protected as a Provincial Heritage Site.
