= Claybank, Saskatchewan =

Hamlet in Saskatchewan, Canada

Coordinates: 50°02′41″N 105°14′01″W

Claybank is a small hamlet in the southern part of the Canadian province of Saskatchewan at the foot of the Dirt Hills. The community is named for the rich clay deposits found in the area. Claybank is best known for its National Historic Site of Canada, the Claybank Brick Plant, which closed in 1989 but remains one of the finest examples of 20th century industry. It is part of the RM of Elmsthorpe No. 100.

== Demographics ==
In the 2021 Census of Population conducted by Statistics Canada, Claybank had a population of 15 living in 9 of its 11 total private dwellings, a change of 0% from its 2016 population of 15. With a land area of 0.18 km^{2} (0.069 sq mi), it had a population density of 83.3/km^{2} (215.8/sq mi) in 2021.

== See also ==
- List of communities in Saskatchewan
