= Briercrest =

- Village
- Village of Briercrest
- Location within Saskatchewan Location within Canada
- Coordinates: 50.1°N 105.16°W
- Country: Canada
- Province: Saskatchewan
- Region: Southeast
- Census division: 4
- Rural Municipality: Redburn
- Post office Founded: 1903

Government
  - Type: Municipal
  - Governing body: Briercrest Village Council
  - Mayor: William Duncan
  - Administrator: Linda Senchuk

Area
  - Total: 0.62 km^{2} (0.24 sq mi)

Population (2016)
  - Total: 159
  - Density: 256.4/km^{2} (664/sq mi)
- Time zone: CST
- Postal code: S0H 0K0
- Area code: 306
- Website: Village of Briercrest

Briercrest (2016 population: 159) is a village in the Canadian province of Saskatchewan within the Rural Municipality of Redburn No. 130 and Census Division No. 6. The village is approximately 42 km southeast of the City of Moose Jaw and 77 km southwest of the City of Regina. When the post office formed in 1903, it was a part of the Federal Electoral District: Assiniboia, North West Territories, as well as part of the provisional district of Assiniboia West, North West Territories, until the province of Saskatchewan was formed in 1905.

== History ==
Briercrest incorporated as a village on April 17, 1912.

== Demographics ==
Population history (1981–2016)
Year	Pop.	±%
1981	151	—
1986	165	+9.3%
1991	140	−15.2%
1996	125	−10.7%
2001	113	−9.6%
2006	117	+3.5%
2011	111	−5.1%
2016	159	+43.2%
Source: Statistics Canada via Saskatchewan Bureau of Statistics

In the 2021 Census of Population conducted by Statistics Canada, Briercrest had a population of 155 living in 65 of its 67 total private dwellings, a change of −2.5% from its 2016 population of 159. With a land area of 0.69 km^{2} (0.27 sq mi), it had a population density of 224.6/km^{2} (581.8/sq mi) in 2021.

In the 2016 Census of Population, the Village of Briercrest recorded a population of 159 living in 65 of its 67 total private dwellings, a 30.2% change from its 2011 population of 111. With a land area of 0.62 km^{2} (0.24 sq mi), it had a population density of 256.5/km^{2} (664.2/sq mi) in 2016.

== Education ==
Coventry School Division (SD) 213, North West Territories (NWT) was one of the first one-room schools started in 1891. Hipperholme SD 467, NWT soon followed in 1899. Many more one-room school districts developed in the early 1900s to survive until the mid-20th century when they were gradually replaced with the Briercrest Family of Schools.

Briercrest College and Seminary

The Briercrest College and Seminary was originally founded as the Briercrest Bible Institute in Briercrest in 1935, which has since moved to Caronport. In 1946, a larger facility was needed for the increasing number of students, and the airbase at Caronport became the school's new home. The school, however, continued to honour its early history by retaining the name of Briercrest as its birthplace.

== See also ==
- List of francophone communities in Saskatchewan
