= Regina metropolitan area =

Coordinates: 50°27′17″N 104°36′24″W

- Census metropolitan area
- Regina Census Metropolitan Area
- Skyline of Regina
- Interactive map of Regina metropolitan area
- Country: Canada
- Province: Saskatchewan
- Urban municipalities: List: Town of Balgonie; Village of Belle Plaine; Village of Buena Vista; Village of Craven; Village of Disley; Village of Edenwold; Town of Grand Coulee; Town of Lumsden; Resort Village of Lumsden Beach; Town of Pense; Town of Pilot Butte; City of Regina; Town of Regina Beach; Town of White City
- Rural municipalities (RMs): List: RM of Edenwold No. 158; RM of Lajord No. 128; RM of Lumsden No. 189; RM of Pense No. 160; RM of Sherwood No. 159

Area
  - Land: 4,323.66 km^{2} (1,669.37 sq mi)
- Elevation: 577 m (1,893 ft)

Population (2021)
  - Total: 249,217
  - Density: 57.6403/km^{2} (149.288/sq mi)
- Canadian CMA rank: 18th
- Time zone: UTC-6 (Central Time)
- Postal Code: S

The Regina metropolitan area is a census metropolitan area (CMA) in the southern portion of the Canadian province of Saskatchewan that is centred on its capital city of Regina. At a population of 249,217 in the 2021 Census of Population as conducted by Statistics Canada, the CMA consists of nineteen municipalities including one city (Regina), seven towns, five villages, one resort village, and five rural municipalities.

== Geography ==
Located in south-central Saskatchewan, the Regina CMA is bisected by Highway 1, which forms part of the Trans-Canada Highway. Municipalities within the CMA include the City of Regina; the towns of Balgonie, Grande Coulee, Lumsden, Pense, Pilot Butte, Regina Beach, and White City; the villages of Belle Plaine, Buena Vista, Craven, Disley, and Edenwold; the Resort Village of Lumsden Beach; and the rural municipalities (RMs) of Edenwold No. 158, Lajord No. 128, Lumsden No. 189, Pense No. 160, and Sherwood No. 159.

== Demographics ==
In the 2021 Census of Population conducted by Statistics Canada, the Regina CMA had a population of 249,217 living in 100,211 of its 108,120 total private dwellings, a change of 5.3% from its 2016 population of 236,695. With a land area of 4,323.66 km^{2} (1,669.37 sq mi), it had a population density of 57.6/km^{2} (149.3/sq mi) in 2021.

Municipalities in the Regina CMA
Name	Status	Incorporation date	2021 Census of Population						
Name	Status	Incorporation date	Population (2021)	Population (2016)	Change	Land area		Population density	
Name	Status	Incorporation date	Population (2021)	Population (2016)	Change	km^{2}	sq mi	/km^{2}	/sq mi
Regina	City	June 19, 1903	226,404	215,106	+5.3%	178.81	69.04	1,266.2	3,279
Balgonie	Town	September 1, 1907	1,756	1,765	−0.5%	4.76	1.84	368.9	955
Grand Coulee	Town	October 26, 2016	606	649	−6.6%	1.74	0.67	348.3	902
Lumsden	Town	March 15, 1905	1,800	1,824	−1.3%	4.92	1.90	365.9	948
Pense	Town	October 24, 2012	603	587	+2.7%	1.32	0.51	456.8	1,183
Pilot Butte	Town	November 1, 1980	2,638	2,137	+23.4%	5.71	2.20	462.0	1,197
Regina Beach	Town	November 1, 1980	1,292	1,145	+12.8%	3.88	1.50	333.0	862
White City	Town	November 1, 2000	3,821	3,099	+23.3%	7.56	2.92	505.4	1,309
Belle Plaine	Village	August 12, 1910	79	85	−7.1%	1.35	0.52	58.5	152
Buena Vista	Village	November 18, 1983	646	612	+5.6%	3.63	1.40	178.0	461
Craven	Village	April 11, 1905	266	214	+24.3%	1.22	0.47	218.0	565
Disley	Village	June 24, 1907	58	67	−13.4%	0.65	0.25	89.2	231
Edenwold	Village	October 3, 1912	243	233	+4.3%	0.69	0.27	352.2	912
Lumsden Beach	Resort village	July 22, 1918	20	10	+100.0%	0.46	0.18	43.5	113
Edenwold No. 158	Rural municipality	December 9, 1912	4,422	4,490	−1.5%	848.84	327.74	5.2	13
Lajord No. 128	Rural municipality	December 13, 1909	985	1,232	−20.0%	945.10	364.91	1.0	2.6
Lumsden No. 189	Rural municipality	December 9, 1912	1,968	1,938	+1.5%	816.17	315.12	2.4	6.2
Pense No. 160	Rural municipality	January 1, 1913	441	508	−13.2%	840.18	324.40	0.5	1.3
Sherwood No. 159	Rural municipality	December 11, 1911	1,219	974	+25.2%	656.66	253.54	1.9	4.9
Total Regina CMA			249,217	236,695	+5.3%	4,323.66	1,669.37	57.6	149

== See also ==
- Saskatoon metropolitan area
