= Saskatchewan Highway 54 =

Provincial highway in Saskatchewan, Canada

Highway 54
- Highway 54 highlighted in red

Route information
- Maintained by Ministry of Highways and Infrastructure
- Length: 16.7 km (10.4 mi)

Major junctions
- South end: Highway 11 near Lumsden
- North end: Regina Beach

Location
- Country: Canada
- Province: Saskatchewan
- Rural municipalities: Lumsden

Highway system
- Provincial highways in Saskatchewan
← Highway 52	→ Highway 55

Highway 54 is a provincial highway in the Canadian province of Saskatchewan. It runs from Highway 11, about 6 km (4 mi) west of Lumsden, north to Buena Vista and Regina Beach along Last Mountain Lake. The highway is approximately 17 km (11 mi) long.

== Route description ==
Hwy 54 begins just 6 kilometres (3.7 mi) west of Lumsden at a junction with Hwy 11 (Louis Riel Trail), with the road continuing south as Range Road 2221 towards Hwy 641. It heads due north through rural farmland for several kilometres, where it meets Township Road 211, which provides access to Lumsden, before curving westward as it passes along the south side of Buena Vista. Now running parallel to the coastline of Last Mountain Lake, the highway enters Regina Beach and comes to an end at the intersection with Centre Street, with the road continuing west towards Kinookimaw as McNabb Road. The entire length of Hwy 54 is a paved, two-lane highway, lying entirely within the Rural Municipality of Lumsden No. 189.

== Major intersections ==
From south to north. The entire route is in Rural Municipality of Lumsden No. 189.

Location	km	mi	Destinations	Notes
	0.0	0.0	Highway 11 (Louis Riel Trail) – Regina, Saskatoon	Southern terminus; continues as Range Road 2221
	11.3	7.0	Township Road 211 – Lumsden Beach	
Buena Vista	12.8	8.0	Highwood Avenue – Buena Vista	
Regina Beach	16.7	10.4	Centre Street / Centre Street – Regina Beach Recreation Site McNabb Road – Kinookimaw, Last Mountain Lake 80A	Northern terminus; northern terminus; continues as McNabb Road
1.000 mi = 1.609 km; 1.000 km = 0.621 mi

== See also ==
- Transportation in Saskatchewan
- Roads in Saskatchewan
