= Pasqua =

Pasqua may refer to:

- Pasqua Lake, Saskatchewan, community in Saskatchewan
- Pasqua Lake, lake in Saskatchewan
- Pasqua First Nation, First Nations in Saskatchewan
- Pasqua 79, Indian Reserve in Saskatchewan
- Pasqua Hospital, hospital in Regina, Saskatchewan
- Pasqua Coffee, a San Francisco-based retail coffee chain that was named the Pedestrian Café when it opened in 1983
- Pasqua Rosée, the first coffeeshop proprietor of London

== See also ==
- Pasqua (surname), including a list of people with the name
