= Deer Valley (disambiguation) =

Deer Valley is a ski resort in Utah.

Deer Valley may also refer to:

- Deer Valley, Phoenix, a neighborhood (urban village) in Phoenix, Arizona
- Deer Valley, Saskatchewan
- Phoenix Deer Valley Airport

== See also ==
- Deer Valley High School (disambiguation)
