= Kinookimaw =

Community in Saskatchewan, Canada

- Unincorporated community
- Interactive map of Kinookimaw
- Coordinates: 50.787820°N 105.006232°W
- Country: Canada
- Province: Saskatchewan
- Rural municipality: Rural Municipality of Lumsden No. 189

Population (1986)
  - Total: 46

Kinookimaw is a hamlet in the Canadian province of Saskatchewan. The name comes from the Cree word kinokamâw, meaning "it is a long body of water".

It is situated on the shores of Last Mountain Lake, adjacent to Regina Beach, and had a population of 46 in 1986.

== See also ==
- List of place names in Canada of Indigenous origin
- List of communities in Saskatchewan
- Last Mountain Lake 80A
