= List of census agglomerations in Canada =

A census agglomeration (CA) is a census geographic unit in Canada determined by Statistics Canada. A CA comprises one or more adjacent census subdivisions that has a core population of 10,000 or greater. It is eligible for classification as a census metropolitan area (CMA) once it reaches a population of 100,000 so long as its core population is 50,000 or greater.

At the 2021 Census of Population, Canada had 111 CAs, down from 117 in 2016. Canada's largest CA by population is Chatham at 104,316, while its smallest by population is Elliot Lake at 11,372. The country's largest CA by land area is Wood Buffalo at 60,957.21 km^{2} (23,535.71 sq mi), while its smallest by land area is Ingersoll at 12.73 km^{2} (4.92 sq mi).

== 2021 changes ==
Statistics Canada's review of CMAs and CAs for the 2021 Census of Population resulted in the addition of five new CAs, the demotion of two CAs, and the promotion of six CAs to CMAs.

New census agglomerations

- Amos, Quebec
- Essa, Ontario
- Ladysmith, British Columbia
- Sainte‑Agathe‑des‑Monts, Quebec
- Trail, British Columbia

Retired census agglomerations

- Bay Roberts, Newfoundland and Labrador
- Cold Lake, Alberta

Promotion to census metropolitan areas

- Chilliwack, British Columbia
- Drummondville, Quebec
- Fredericton, New Brunswick
- Kamloops, British Columbia
- Nanaimo, British Columbia
- Red Deer, Alberta

== List ==
List of census agglomerations in Canada
Census agglomeration	Province or territory	2021 Census of Population				
Census agglomeration	Province or territory	Population (2021)	Population (2016)	Change	Land area (km^{2})	Population density
Alma	Quebec	30,331	30,771	−1.4%	194.92	155.6
Amos	Quebec	18,873	18,872	0.0%	2,298.16	8.2
Baie-Comeau	Quebec	26,643	27,692	−3.8%	682.89	39.0
Bathurst	New Brunswick	31,387	31,110	+0.9%	2,100.05	14.9
Brandon	Manitoba	54,268	51,807	+4.8%	1,232.81	44.0
Brockville	Ontario	31,661	31,200	+1.5%	576.87	54.9
Brooks	Alberta	14,924	14,451	+3.3%	18.21	819.5
Campbell River	British Columbia	40,704	37,861	+7.5%	1,734.05	23.5
Campbellton	New Brunswick / Quebec	13,330	14,679	−9.2%	1,525.45	8.7
Camrose	Alberta	18,772	18,742	+0.2%	41.67	450.5
Canmore	Alberta	15,990	13,992	+14.3%	68.47	233.5
Cape Breton	Nova Scotia	98,318	98,722	−0.4%	2,457.21	40.0
Centre Wellington	Ontario	31,093	28,191	+10.3%	409.41	75.9
Charlottetown	Prince Edward Island	78,858	71,821	+9.8%	1,112.43	70.9
Chatham-Kent	Ontario	104,316	102,042	+2.2%	2,464.52	42.3
Cobourg	Ontario	20,519	19,440	+5.6%	22.41	915.6
Collingwood	Ontario	24,811	21,793	+13.8%	33.15	748.4
Corner Brook	Newfoundland and Labrador	29,762	30,969	−3.9%	1,122.58	26.5
Cornwall	Ontario	61,415	59,699	+2.9%	509.21	120.6
Courtenay	British Columbia	63,282	57,950	+9.2%	624.33	101.4
Cowansville	Quebec	15,234	13,656	+11.6%	46.87	325.0
Cranbrook	British Columbia	27,040	26,068	+3.7%	4,563.87	5.9
Dawson Creek	British Columbia	17,878	18,890	−5.4%	11,716.8	1.5
Dolbeau-Mistassini	Quebec	15,306	15,750	−2.8%	647.75	23.6
Duncan	British Columbia	47,582	44,451	+7.0%	373.22	127.5
Edmundston	New Brunswick	22,144	21,955	+0.9%	1,582.36	14.0
Elliot Lake	Ontario	11,372	10,741	+5.9%	696.06	16.3
Essa	Ontario	22,970	21,083	+9.0%	279.92	82.1
Estevan	Saskatchewan	12,798	13,615	−6.0%	793.36	16.1
Fort St. John	British Columbia	28,729	28,396	+1.2%	617.73	46.5
Gander	Newfoundland and Labrador	13,414	13,234	+1.4%	2,412.67	5.6
Granby	Quebec	90,833	85,056	+6.8%	494.1	183.8
Grand Falls-Windsor	Newfoundland and Labrador	13,853	14,171	−2.2%	54.84	252.6
Grande Prairie	Alberta	64,141	63,166	+1.5%	132.71	483.3
Hawkesbury	Ontario / Quebec	12,010	11,974	+0.3%	12.91	930.3
High River	Alberta	14,324	13,594	+5.4%	22.19	645.5
Ingersoll	Ontario	13,693	12,757	+7.3%	12.73	1,075.6
Joliette	Quebec	52,706	49,439	+6.6%	108.66	485.1
Kawartha Lakes	Ontario	79,247	75,423	+5.1%	3,033.66	26.1
Kenora	Ontario	14,967	15,096	−0.9%	211.65	70.7
Kentville	Nova Scotia	26,929	26,222	+2.7%	607.05	44.4
Lachute	Quebec	14,100	12,862	+9.6%	108.66	129.8
Lacombe	Alberta	13,396	13,057	+2.6%	20.59	650.6
Ladysmith	British Columbia	15,501	14,572	+6.4%	412.01	37.6
Lloydminster	Alberta / Saskatchewan	36,508	36,736	−0.6%	1,984.24	18.4
Matane	Quebec	18,474	18,894	−2.2%	865.87	21.3
Medicine Hat	Alberta	76,376	76,522	−0.2%	13,106.11	5.8
Midland	Ontario	27,894	25,826	+8.0%	60.75	459.2
Miramichi	New Brunswick	27,593	27,518	+0.3%	7,564.06	3.6
Moose Jaw	Saskatchewan	34,872	35,053	−0.5%	843.44	41.3
Nelson	British Columbia	19,119	18,307	+4.4%	1,224.3	15.6
New Glasgow	Nova Scotia	34,397	34,487	−0.3%	2,066.47	16.6
Norfolk	Ontario	67,490	64,044	+5.4%	1,597.68	42.2
North Battleford	Saskatchewan	19,374	20,052	−3.4%	1,118.54	17.3
North Bay	Ontario	71,736	70,378	+1.9%	5,314.85	13.5
Okotoks	Alberta	30,405	29,016	+4.8%	38.55	788.7
Orillia	Ontario	33,411	31,166	+7.2%	28.53	1,171.1
Owen Sound	Ontario	32,712	31,820	+2.8%	624.18	52.4
Parksville	British Columbia	31,054	28,922	+7.4%	81.81	379.6
Pembroke	Ontario	23,814	23,269	+2.3%	553.4	43.0
Penticton	British Columbia	47,380	43,534	+8.8%	1,734.72	27.3
Petawawa	Ontario	18,160	17,187	+5.7%	164.7	110.3
Port Alberni	British Columbia	25,786	24,669	+4.5%	1,633.13	15.8
Port Hope	Ontario	17,294	16,753	+3.2%	278.8	62.0
Portage la Prairie	Manitoba	13,270	13,304	−0.3%	24.72	536.8
Powell River	British Columbia	17,825	16,783	+6.2%	799.8	22.3
Prince Albert	Saskatchewan	45,718	44,160	+3.5%	2,537.68	18.0
Prince George	British Columbia	89,490	86,622	+3.3%	17,650.99	5.1
Prince Rupert	British Columbia	13,442	13,462	−0.1%	3,303.63	4.1
Quesnel	British Columbia	23,113	23,146	−0.1%	21,708.62	1.1
Rimouski	Quebec	53,944	53,498	+0.8%	772.93	69.8
Rivière-du-Loup	Quebec	30,025	28,902	+3.9%	543.02	55.3
Rouyn-Noranda	Quebec	42,313	42,334	0.0%	5,963.57	7.1
Sainte-Agathe-des-Monts	Quebec	19,892	18,010	+10.4%	210.96	94.3
Sainte-Marie	Quebec	13,134	13,565	−3.2%	107.55	122.1
Saint-Georges	Quebec	34,833	34,176	+1.9%	365.21	95.4
Saint-Hyacinthe	Quebec	59,980	58,201	+3.1%	259.38	231.2
Salaberry-de-Valleyfield	Quebec	42,787	40,745	+5.0%	108.56	394.1
Salmon Arm	British Columbia	19,705	17,904	+10.1%	165.42	119.1
Sarnia	Ontario	97,592	96,151	+1.5%	1,117.2	87.4
Sault Ste. Marie	Ontario	76,731	78,159	−1.8%	802.58	95.6
Sept-Îles	Quebec	27,729	28,534	−2.8%	1,750.44	15.8
Shawinigan	Quebec	49,620	49,349	+0.5%	729.98	68.0
Sorel-Tracy	Quebec	41,934	41,629	+0.7%	170.31	246.2
Squamish	British Columbia	24,232	19,893	+21.8%	105.43	229.8
Steinbach	Manitoba	17,806	16,022	+11.1%	37.56	474.1
Stratford	Ontario	33,232	31,470	+5.6%	30.02	1,107.0
Strathmore	Alberta	14,339	13,756	+4.2%	26.98	531.5
Summerside	Prince Edward Island	18,157	16,831	+7.9%	125.12	145.1
Swift Current	Saskatchewan	18,745	18,536	+1.1%	1,129.78	16.6
Sylvan Lake	Alberta	16,514	15,302	+7.9%	24.25	681.0
Terrace	British Columbia	19,606	19,160	+2.3%	9,721.84	2.0
Thetford Mines	Quebec	28,287	27,564	+2.6%	405.92	69.7
Thompson	Manitoba	13,035	13,678	−4.7%	16.62	784.3
Tillsonburg	Ontario	18,615	15,872	+17.3%	22.2	838.5
Timmins	Ontario	41,145	41,788	−1.5%	2,955.33	13.9
Trail	British Columbia	14,268	14,196	+0.5%	279.13	51.1
Truro	Nova Scotia	46,157	45,753	+0.9%	2,732.53	16.9
Val-d'Or	Quebec	34,037	33,871	+0.5%	3,539.98	9.6
Vernon	British Columbia	67,086	61,324	+9.4%	1,041.09	64.4
Victoriaville	Quebec	52,936	51,336	+3.1%	378.1	140.0
Wasaga Beach	Ontario	24,862	20,675	+20.3%	57.42	433.0
Wetaskiwin	Alberta	12,594	12,655	−0.5%	18.75	671.7
Weyburn	Saskatchewan	12,247	12,055	+1.6%	828.28	14.8
Whitehorse	Yukon	31,913	28,225	+13.1%	8,465.21	3.8
Williams Lake	British Columbia	23,608	23,113	+2.1%	12,422.14	1.9
Winkler	Manitoba	32,655	30,297	+7.8%	872.19	37.4
Wood Buffalo	Alberta	73,837	73,325	+0.7%	60,957.21	1.2
Woodstock	Ontario	46,705	41,098	+13.6%	56.46	827.2
Yellowknife	Northwest Territories	20,340	19,569	+3.9%	103.37	196.8
Yorkton	Saskatchewan	19,859	19,927	−0.3%	1,623.32	12.2

== See also ==
- Census geographic units of Canada
- List of metropolitan areas in Canada
