= Pasqua (surname) =

Pasqua is a surname meaning "Easter" in Italian.

Notable people with the name include:

- Alan Pasqua (born 1952), American jazz pianist and composer
- Charles Pasqua (1927–2015), French businessman and Gaullist politician
- Dan Pasqua (born 1961), American baseball player
- Giuseppina Pasqua (1855–1930), Italian opera singer
- Joe Pasqua (1918–1998), American football player
- Michael Di Pasqua (1953–2016), American percussionist
- Simone Pasqua (1492–1565), Italian Roman Catholic bishop and cardinal
- Ugolino Vivaldi Pasqua (1885–1910), Italian aviation pioneer
