= Day Star First Nation =

First Nation in Saskatchewan, Canada

- Band No. 389
- Treaty: Treaty 4
- Headquarters: Punnichy
- Province: Saskatchewan

Land
- Main reserve: Day Star 87
- Reserve: Last Mountain Lake 80A
- Land area: 67.243 km^{2} (25.963 sq mi)

Population (2019)
- On reserve: 170
- Off reserve: 360
- Total population: 530

Government
- Chief: Lloyd Buffalo

Website
- daystarfn.com

Day Star First Nation (Cree: ᑮᓯᑳᐘᒑᕽ kîsikâwacâhk) is a First Nations band government in Saskatchewan, Canada. Their reserves include:

- Day Star 87
- Last Mountain Lake 80A
- Treaty Four Reserve Grounds 77, shared with 32 other bands.
