= Day Star 87 =

Indian reserve in Saskatchewan, Canada

Coordinates: 51°32′16″N 104°15′51″W

- Indian reserve
- Day Star Indian Reserve No. 87
- Location in Saskatchewan
- First Nation: Day Star
- Country: Canada
- Province: Saskatchewan

Area
  - Total: 6,216.1 ha (15,360 acres)

Population (2016)
  - Total: 148
  - Density: 2.38/km^{2} (6.17/sq mi)
- Community Well-Being Index: 65

Day Star 87 is an Indian reserve of the Day Star First Nation in Saskatchewan. It is 87 kilometres (54 mi) north-west of Fort Qu'Appelle. In the 2016 Canadian Census, it recorded a population of 148 living in 42 of its 62 total private dwellings. In the same year, its Community Well-Being index was calculated at 65 of 100, compared to 58.4 for the average First Nations community and 77.5 for the average non-Indigenous community.

== See also ==
- List of Indian reserves in Saskatchewan
