= Disley, Saskatchewan =

Village in Saskatchewan, Canada

Disley
- Village
- Village of Disley
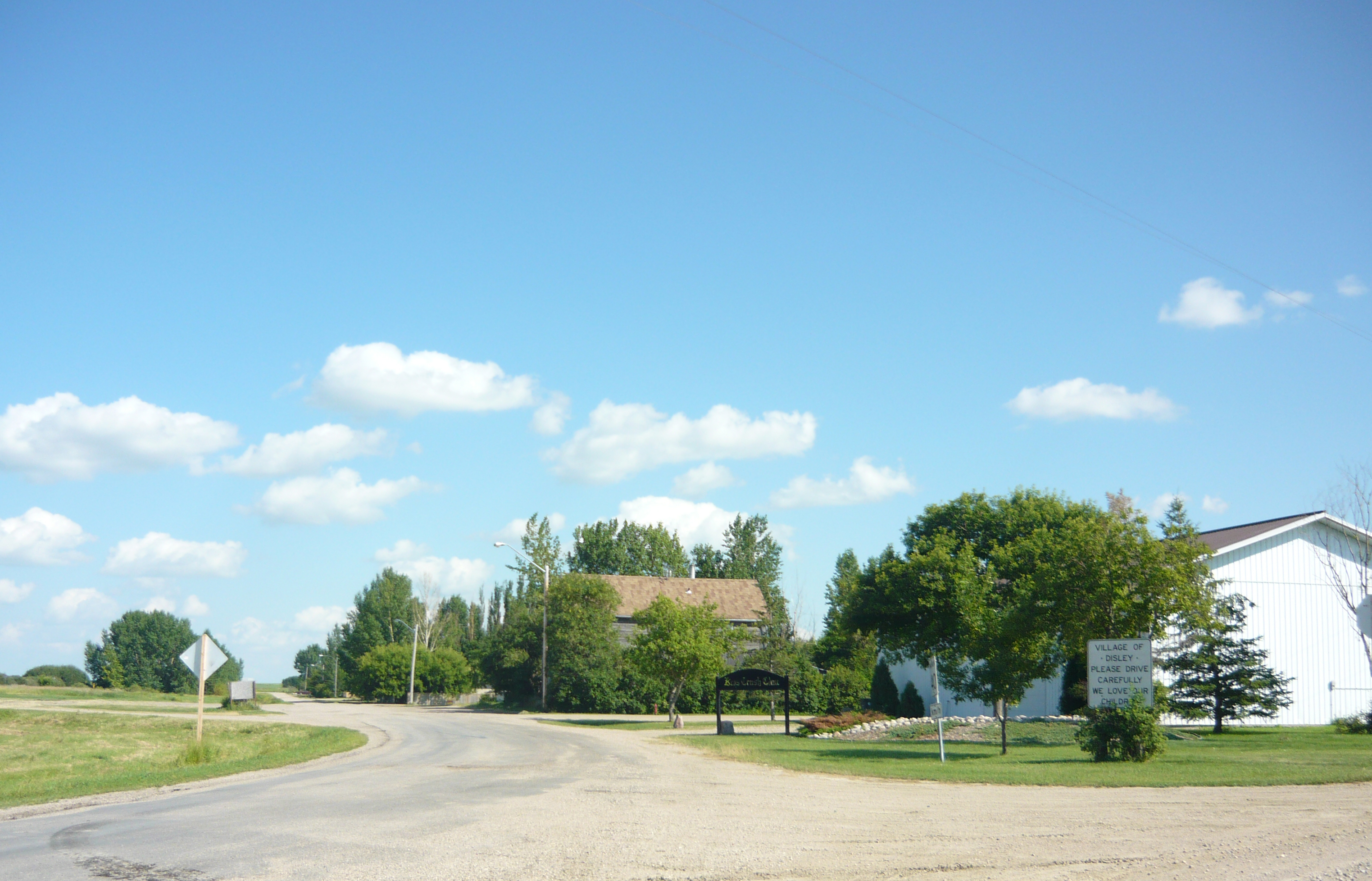
- First Street, Disley

- Location of Disley in Saskatchewan Disley (Canada)
- Coordinates: 50°38′27″N 105°02′58″W
- Country: Canada
- Province: Saskatchewan
- Region: Southeast
- Census division: 6
- Rural municipality: Lumsden No. 189
- Post office Founded: April 1, 1904
- Incorporated (village): June 24, 1907.

Government
  - Type: Municipality
  - Governing body: Village Council
  - Mayor: Jeff Keith
  - Administrator: Rhonda Woelk

Area (2021)
  - Total: 0.65 km^{2} (0.25 sq mi)

Population (2021)
  - Total: 58
  - Density: 89.2/km^{2} (231/sq mi)
- Time zone: UTC−06:00 (CST)
- Postal code: S0G 3C0
- Area code: 306
- Highways: Highway 11
- Railways: Canadian National Railway

Disley (2021 population: 58) is a village in the Canadian province of Saskatchewan within the Rural Municipality of Lumsden No. 189 and Census Division No. 6. It is 18 kilometres (11 mi) west of Lumsden just south of the Louis Riel Trail (Highway 11) and 48 kilometres (30 mi) northwest of the city of Regina.

== History ==
Disley incorporated as a village on June 24, 1907.

== Demographics ==
Population history (1981–2016)
Year	Pop.	±%
1981	41	—
1986	51	+24.4%
1991	60	+17.6%
1996	51	−15.0%
2001	62	+21.6%
2006	62	+0.0%
2011	75	+21.0%
2016	67	−10.7%
2021	58	−13.4%
Source: Statistics Canada via Saskatchewan Bureau of Statistics

In the 2021 Canadian census conducted by Statistics Canada, Disley had a population of 58 living in 28 of its 31 total private dwellings, a change of −13.4% from its 2016 population of 67. With a land area of 0.65 km^{2} (0.25 sq mi), it had a population density of 89.2/km^{2} (231.1/sq mi) in 2021.

In the 2016 Canadian census, the Village of Disley recorded a population of 67 living in 28 of its 33 total private dwellings, a −11.9% change from its 2011 population of 75. With a land area of 0.65 km^{2} (0.25 sq mi), it had a population density of 103.1/km^{2} (267.0/sq mi) in 2016.

== See also ==
- List of communities in Saskatchewan
- List of villages in Saskatchewan
