= List of census metropolitan areas and agglomerations in Canada =

Census metropolitan areas (CMAs) and census agglomerations (CAs) are geographic units defined by Statistics Canada to encompass an urban core and environs. This list is arranged by population, using data from the 2021 and 2016 Canadian censuses.

A city's metropolitan area in colloquial or administrative terms may be different from its CMA as defined by Statistics Canada, resulting in differing populations. Such is the case with the Greater Toronto Area, where its metro population is notably higher than its CMA population due to its inclusion of the neighbouring Oshawa CMA to the east and the Burlington portion of the neighbouring Hamilton CMA to the west.

In 2021, 27,465,137 people (71.9% of Canada's population) lived in a CMA, while 4,596,279 (12.0%) lived in a CA.

== Recent growth ==
Between 2016 and 2021, the five CMAs with the highest percentage growth were located in British Columbia and Southern Ontario. The five CMAs with the lowest percentage growth were in Quebec, Alberta, Northern Ontario and Newfoundland and Labrador. There were no CMAs for which negative growth was recorded in the 2021 census. The five CAs that grew the fastest were in British Columbia, Southern Ontario, and Alberta, while the five CAs whose population declined the most were in New Brunswick, Saskatchewan, Northern British Columbia, Manitoba and Newfoundland and Labrador.

Between 2011 and 2016, the six fastest-growing CMAs by percentage growth were located in Western Canada, with Alberta's two CMAs, Calgary and Edmonton, leading the country. Saskatoon, Regina, and Lethbridge rounded out the top five in the country and each grew by at least 10%. Of the remaining 30 CMAs, population growth was recorded in all but two of them. Those that experienced population decline were Brantford and Saint John. Ten of the fifteen fastest-growing CAs in Canada between the two most recent censuses were located in Alberta. The other five were located in British Columbia with two, and Manitoba, Ontario and Yukon each with one.

Between 2006 and 2011, twenty-four CAs experienced population decline. The fifteen CAs that experienced the greatest population decline were located in British Columbia (two), Manitoba (one), New Brunswick (one), Nova Scotia (three), Ontario (four) and Quebec (four). Okotoks experienced the greatest increase while Thompson experienced the greatest decline.

== List ==
Canada had 41 CMAs and 111 CAs at the 2021 census. The number of CMAs increased from 35 in 2016 with the promotion of the Nanaimo, Kamloops, Chilliwack, Fredericton, Drummondville and Red Deer CAs. Overall, between promotion to CMA, absorption, and dissolution, the number of CAs decreased by seven. Amos was reinstated as a CA and Ladysmith, Trail and Essa were added as new CAs. The Carleton Place and Arnprior CAs were dissolved as they were added to the Ottawa–Gatineau CMA, the Leamington CA was dissolved as it was added to the Windsor CMA, and the Cold Lake and Bay Roberts CAs were dissolved as their urban population decreased below 10,000. 2016 rankings in the chart below are based on 2021 boundaries and exclude the five CAs dissolved in 2021 but include the four new/reinstated CAs.

Canada had 35 CMAs and 117 CAs at the 2016 census. The number of CMAs increased from 33 in 2011 with the promotion of the Belleville and Lethbridge CAs. The number of CAs increased from 113 through the creation of eight new CAs – Arnprior, Carleton Place, Gander, Nelson, Sainte-Marie, Wasaga Beach, Weyburn and Winkler – the demotion of two CAs – Amos and Temiskaming Shores – and the promotion of Belleville and Lethbridge to CMAs.

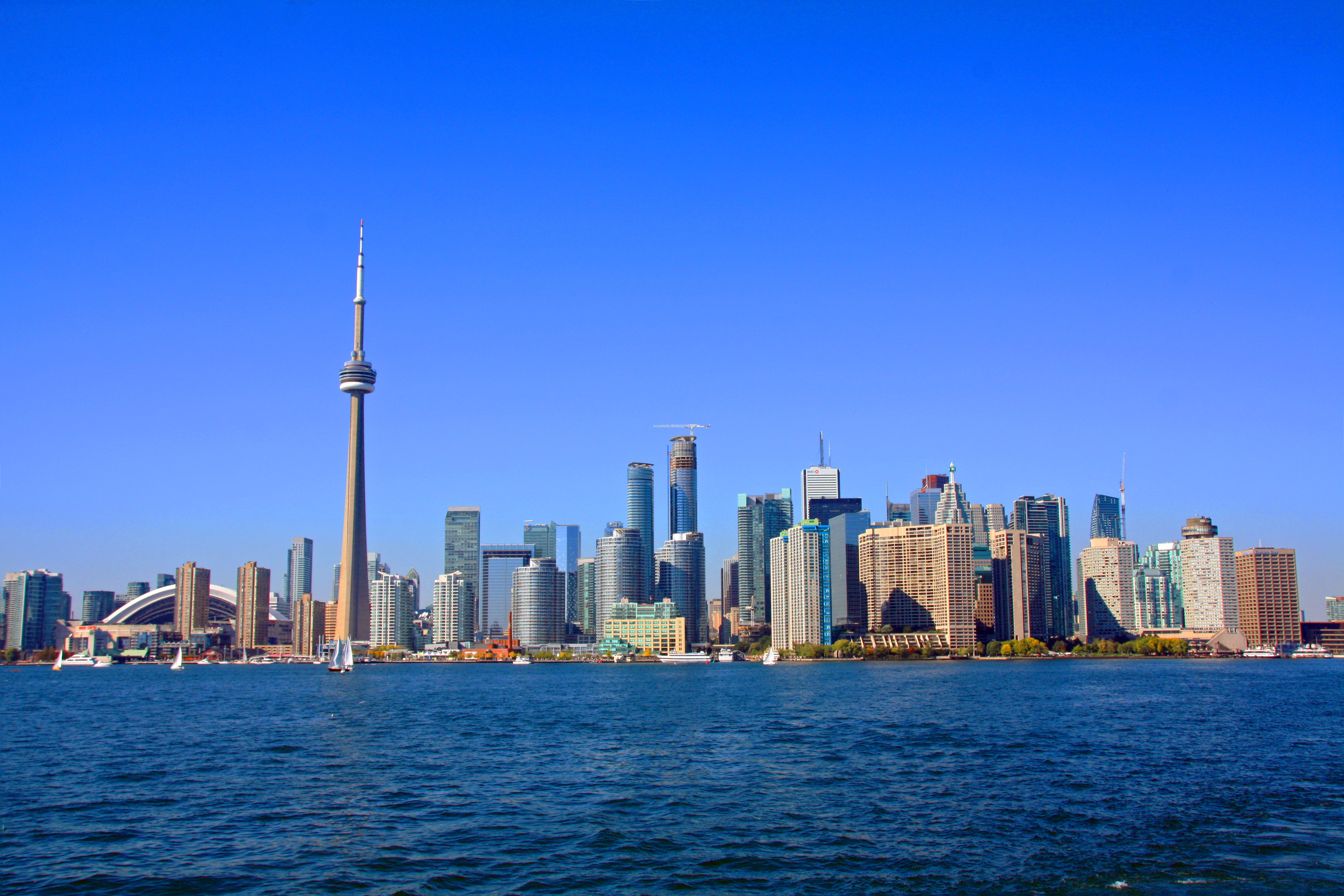
Toronto (6,202,225)

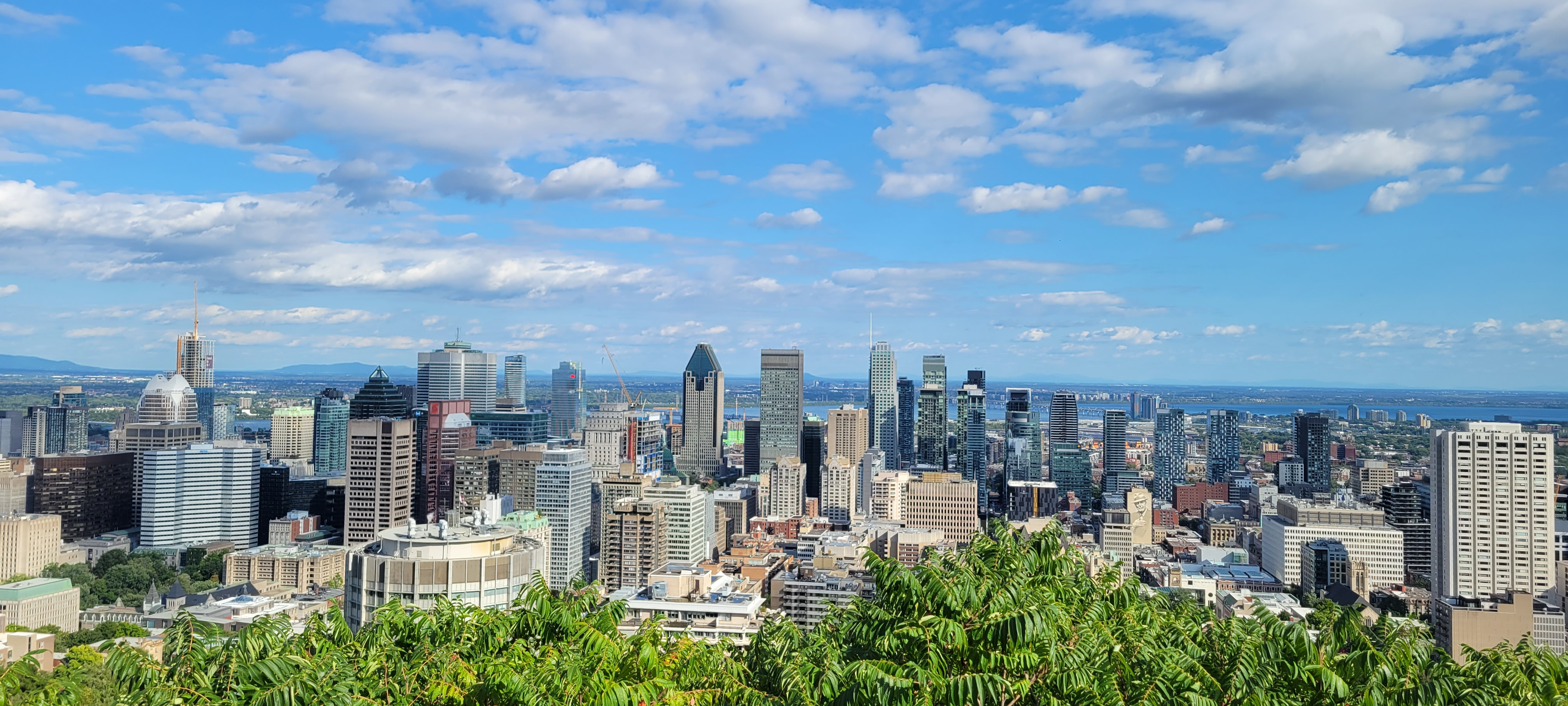
Montreal (4,291,732)

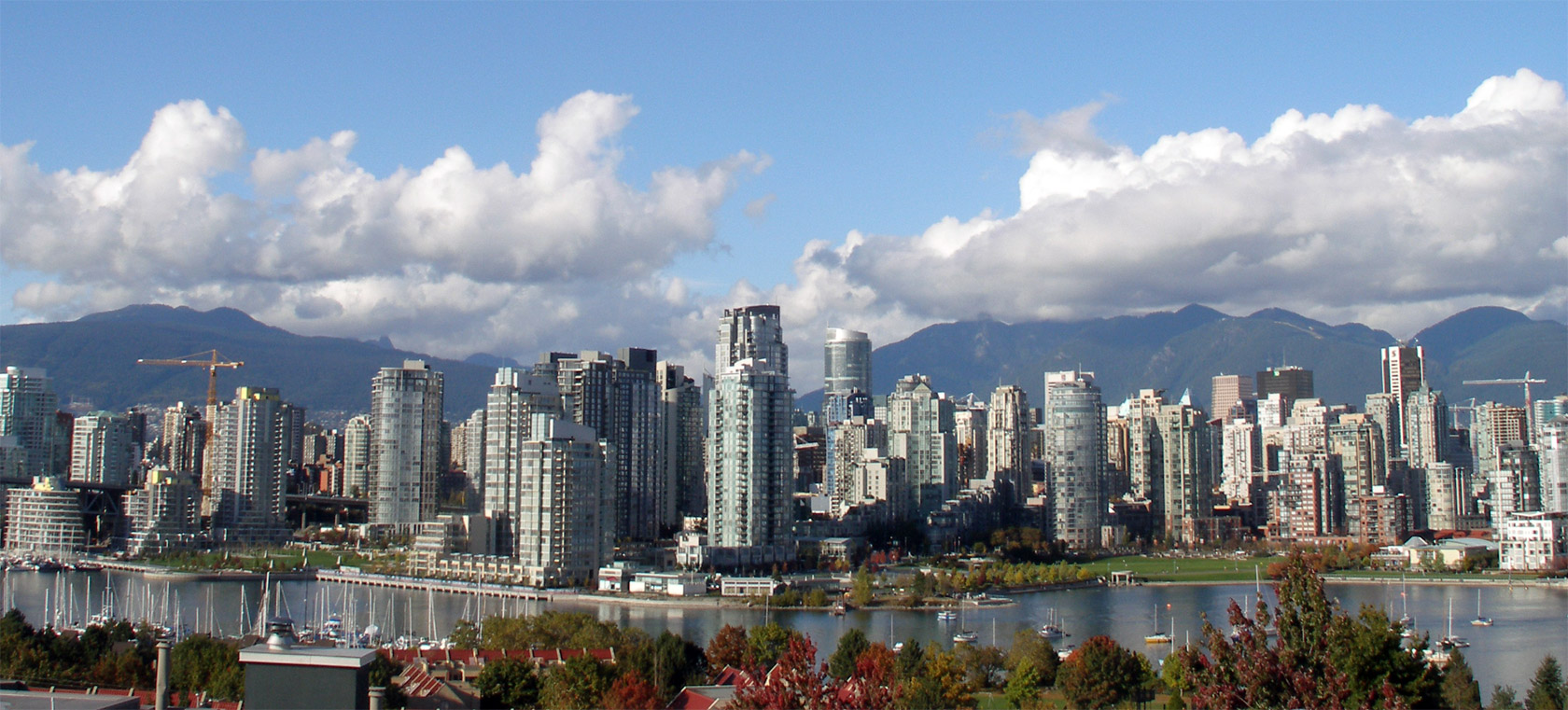
Vancouver (2,642,825)

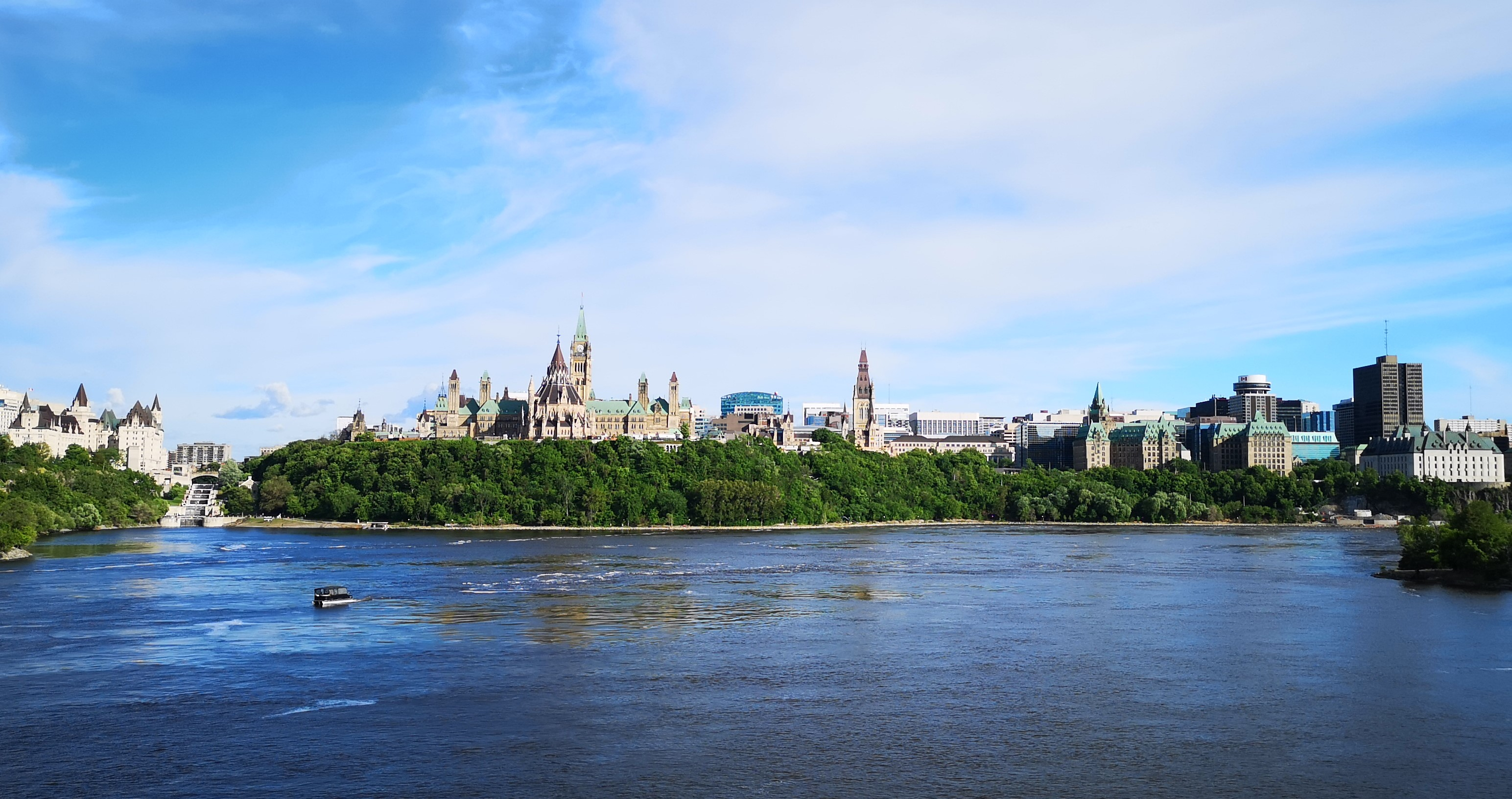
Ottawa–Gatineau (1,488,307)

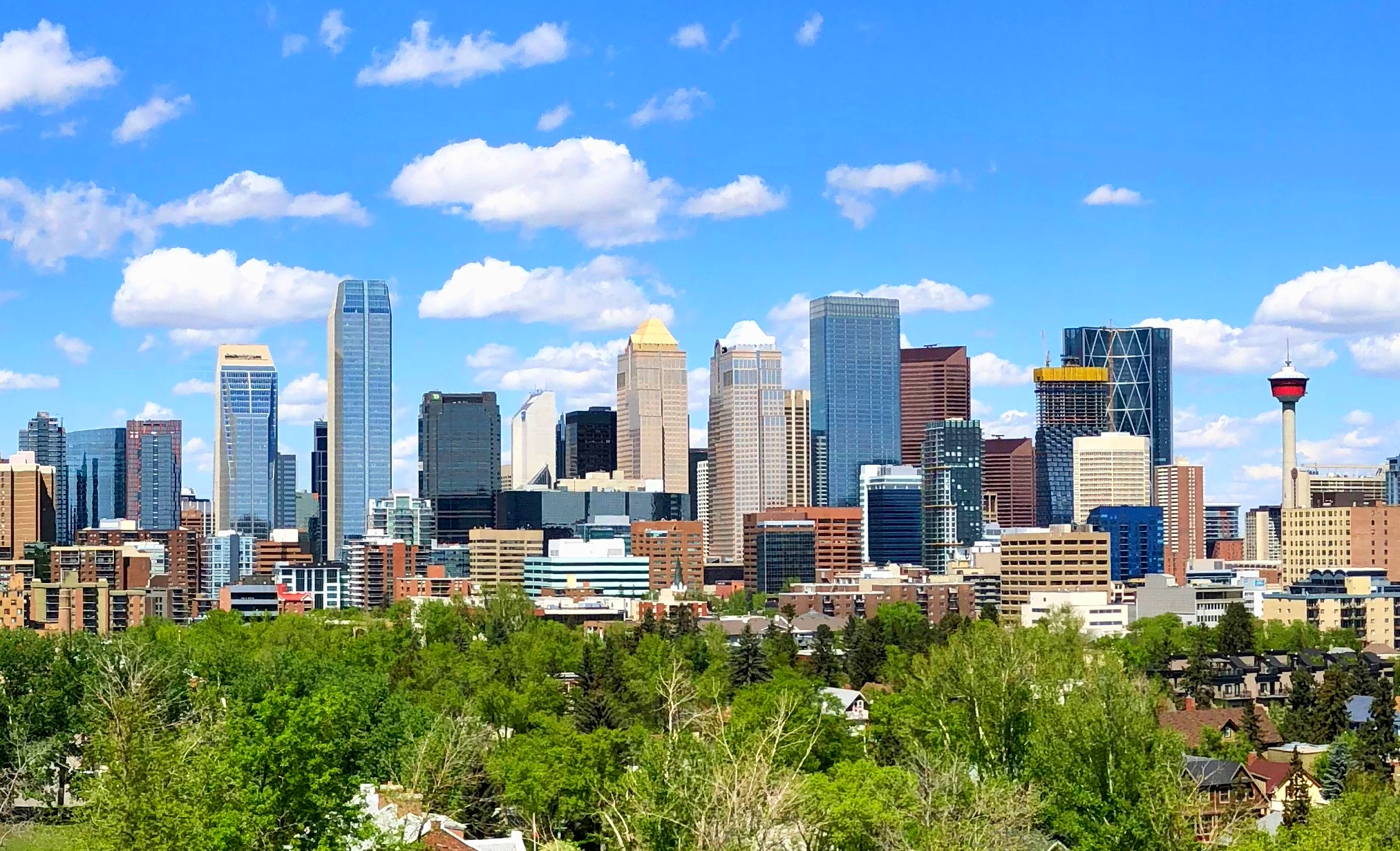
Calgary (1,481,806)

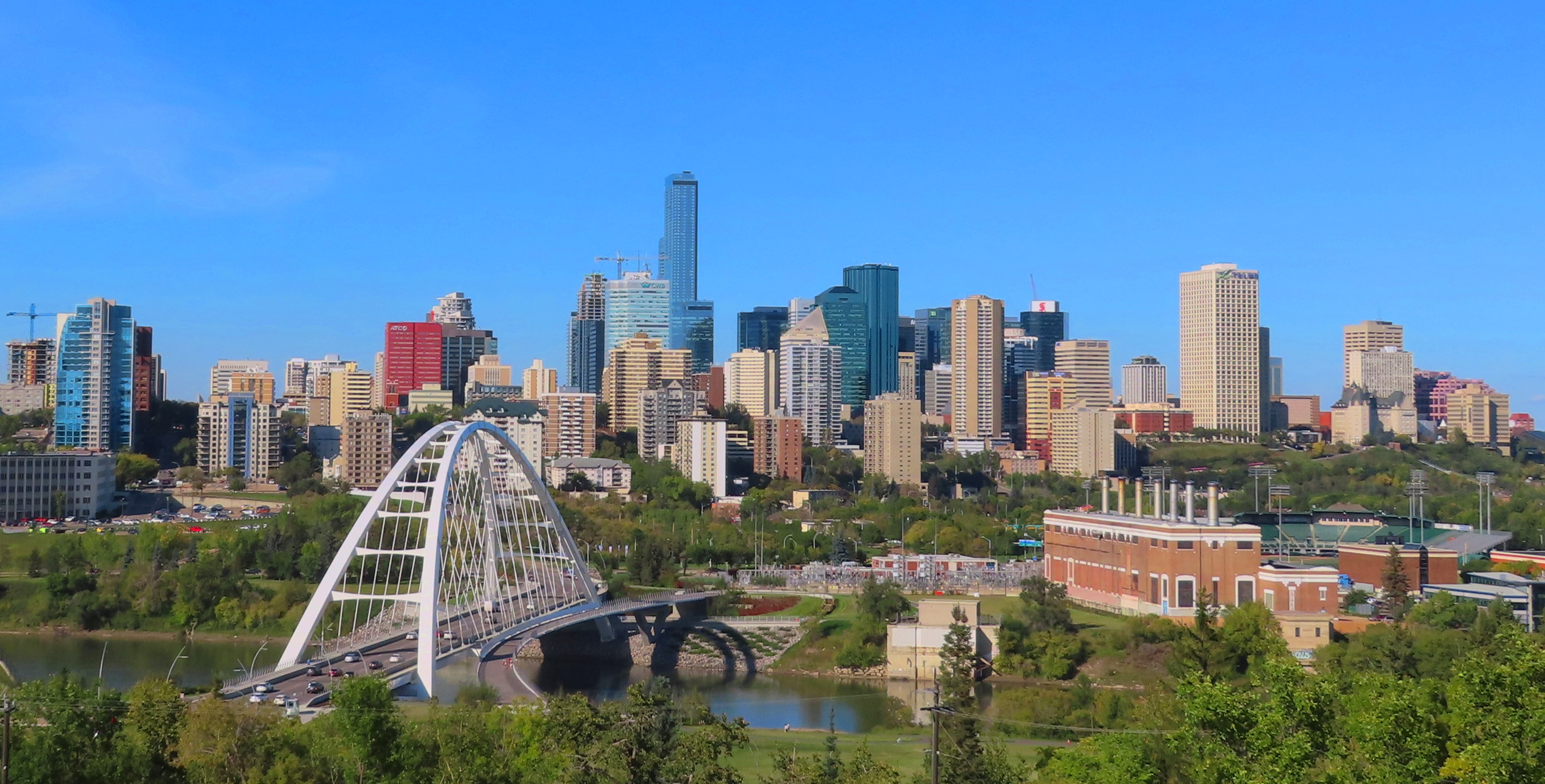
Edmonton (1,418,118)

Rank (2021)	Rank (2016)	Geographic name	Province	Type	Population		Chg.	Land area (km^{2})	Pop. density (/km^{2})
Rank (2021)	Rank (2016)	Geographic name	Province	Type	(2021)	(2016)	Chg.	Land area (km^{2})	Pop. density (/km^{2})
1	1	Toronto	Ontario	CMA	6,202,225	5,928,040	+4.63%	5902.75	1,050.7
2	2	Montreal	Quebec	CMA	4,291,732	4,104,074	+4.57%	4670.10	919.0
3	3	Vancouver	British Columbia	CMA	2,642,825	2,463,431	+7.28%	2878.93	918.0
4	5	Ottawa–Gatineau	Ontario/Quebec	CMA	1,488,307	1,371,576	+8.51%	8046.99	185.0
5	4	Calgary	Alberta	CMA	1,481,806	1,392,609	+6.41%	5098.68	290.6
6	6	Edmonton	Alberta	CMA	1,418,118	1,321,441	+7.32%	9416.19	150.6
7	7	Quebec City	Quebec	CMA	839,311	806,406	+4.08%	3499.46	239.8
8	8	Winnipeg	Manitoba	CMA	834,678	783,099	+6.59%	5285.46	157.9
9	9	Hamilton	Ontario	CMA	785,184	747,545	+5.04%	1373.15	571.8
10	10	Kitchener–Cambridge–Waterloo	Ontario	CMA	575,847	523,894	+9.92%	1092.33	527.2
11	11	London	Ontario	CMA	543,551	494,069	+10.02%	2661.48	204.2
12	12	Halifax	Nova Scotia	CMA	465,703	426,932	+9.08%	7276.22	64.0
13	13	St. Catharines–Niagara	Ontario	CMA	433,604	406,074	+6.78%	1397.09	310.4
14	14	Windsor	Ontario	CMA	422,630	398,718	+6.00%	1803.17	234.4
15	15	Oshawa	Ontario	CMA	415,311	379,848	+9.34%	903.25	459.8
16	16	Victoria	British Columbia	CMA	397,237	367,770	+8.01%	695.29	571.3
17	17	Saskatoon	Saskatchewan	CMA	317,480	295,095	+7.59%	5864.48	54.1
18	18	Regina	Saskatchewan	CMA	249,217	236,695	+5.29%	4323.66	57.6
19	19	Sherbrooke	Quebec	CMA	227,398	212,105	+7.21%	1458.10	156.0
20	22	Kelowna	British Columbia	CMA	222,162	194,892	+13.99%	2902.45	76.5
21	21	Barrie	Ontario	CMA	212,856	197,059	+8.02%	897.26	237.2
22	20	St. John's	Newfoundland and Labrador	CMA	212,579	208,418	+2.00%	931.56	228.2
23	23	Abbotsford–Mission	British Columbia	CMA	195,726	180,518	+8.42%	606.72	322.6
24	26	Kingston	Ontario	CMA	172,546	161,175	+7.06%	1919.17	89.9
25	24	Greater Sudbury	Ontario	CMA	170,605	165,958	+2.80%	4187.40	40.7
26	28	Guelph	Ontario	CMA	165,588	151,984	+8.95%	595.08	278.3
27	25	Saguenay	Quebec	CMA	161,567	161,520	+0.03%	3133.53	51.6
28	27	Trois-Rivières	Quebec	CMA	161,489	156,042	+3.49%	1038.64	155.5
29	29	Moncton	New Brunswick	CMA	157,717	144,810	+8.91%	2562.47	61.5
30	30	Brantford	Ontario	CMA	144,162	134,203	+7.42%	1074.00	134.2
31	31	Saint John	New Brunswick	CMA	130,613	126,202	+3.50%	3505.66	37.3
32	32	Peterborough	Ontario	CMA	128,624	121,721	+5.67%	1508.44	85.3
33	34	Lethbridge	Alberta	CMA	123,847	117,394	+5.50%	2958.96	41.9
34	33	Thunder Bay	Ontario	CMA	123,258	121,621	+1.35%	2550.79	48.3
35	35	Nanaimo	British Columbia	CMA	115,459	104,936	+10.03%	1279.28	90.3
36	36	Kamloops	British Columbia	CMA	114,142	103,811	+9.95%	5654.08	20.2
37	40	Chilliwack	British Columbia	CMA	113,767	101,512	+12.07%	1444.02	78.8
38	37	Belleville–Quinte West	Ontario	CMA	111,184	103,401	+7.53%	1337.50	83.1
39	38	Fredericton	New Brunswick	CMA	108,610	102,690	+5.76%	6014.66	18.1
40	39	Chatham-Kent	Ontario	CA	104,316	102,042	+2.23%	2464.52	42.3
41	43	Drummondville	Quebec	CMA	101,610	97,149	+4.59%	1094.36	92.8
42	41	Red Deer	Alberta	CMA	100,844	100,418	+0.42%	104.34	966.5
43	42	Cape Breton	Nova Scotia	CA	98,318	98,722	−0.41%	2457.21	40.0
44	44	Sarnia	Ontario	CA	97,592	96,151	+1.50%	1117.20	87.4
45	46	Granby	Quebec	CA	90,833	85,056	+6.79%	494.10	183.8
46	45	Prince George	British Columbia	CA	89,490	86,622	+3.31%	17650.99	5.1
47	49	Kawartha Lakes	Ontario	CA	79,247	75,423	+5.07%	3033.66	26.1
48	51	Charlottetown	Prince Edward Island	CA	78,858	71,821	+9.80%	1112.43	70.9
49	47	Sault Ste. Marie	Ontario	CA	76,731	78,159	−1.83%	802.58	95.6
50	48	Medicine Hat	Alberta	CA	76,376	76,522	−0.19%	13106.11	5.8
51	50	Wood Buffalo	Alberta	CA	73,837	73,325	+0.70%	60957.21	1.2
52	52	North Bay	Ontario	CA	71,736	70,378	+1.93%	5314.85	13.5
53	53	Norfolk	Ontario	CA	67,490	64,044	+5.38%	1597.68	42.2
54	55	Vernon	British Columbia	CA	67,086	61,324	+9.40%	1041.09	64.4
55	54	Grande Prairie	Alberta	CA	64,141	63,166	+1.54%	132.71	483.3
56	58	Courtenay	British Columbia	CA	63,282	57,950	+9.20%	624.33	101.4
57	56	Cornwall	Ontario	CA	61,415	59,699	+2.87%	509.21	120.6
58	57	Saint-Hyacinthe	Quebec	CA	59,980	58,201	+3.06%	259.38	231.2
59	60	Brandon	Manitoba	CA	54,268	51,807	+4.75%	1232.81	44.0
60	59	Rimouski	Quebec	CA	53,944	53,498	+0.83%	772.93	69.8
61	61	Victoriaville	Quebec	CA	52,936	51,336	+3.12%	378.10	140.0
62	62	Joliette	Quebec	CA	52,706	49,439	+6.61%	108.66	485.1
63	63	Shawinigan	Quebec	CA	49,620	49,349	+0.55%	729.98	68.0
64	65	Duncan	British Columbia	CA	47,582	44,451	+7.04%	373.22	127.5
65	67	Penticton	British Columbia	CA	47,380	43,534	+8.83%	1734.72	27.3
66	71	Woodstock	Ontario	CA	46,705	41,098	+13.64%	56.46	827.2
67	64	Truro	Nova Scotia	CA	46,157	45,753	+0.88%	2732.53	16.9
68	66	Prince Albert	Saskatchewan	CA	45,718	44,160	+3.53%	2537.68	18.0
69	72	Salaberry-de-Valleyfield	Quebec	CA	42,787	40,745	+5.01%	108.56	394.1
70	68	Rouyn-Noranda	Quebec	CA	42,313	42,334	−0.05%	5963.57	7.1
71	70	Sorel-Tracy	Quebec	CA	41,934	41,629	+0.73%	170.31	246.2
72	69	Timmins	Ontario	CA	41,145	41,788	−1.54%	2955.33	13.9
73	73	Campbell River	British Columbia	CA	40,704	37,861	+7.51%	1734.05	23.5
74	74	Lloydminster	Alberta/Saskatchewan	CA	36,508	36,736	−0.62%	1984.24	18.4
75	75	Moose Jaw	Saskatchewan	CA	34,872	35,053	−0.52%	843.44	41.3
76	77	Saint-Georges	Quebec	CA	34,833	34,176	+1.92%	365.21	95.4
77	76	New Glasgow	Nova Scotia	CA	34,397	34,487	−0.26%	2066.47	16.6
78	78	Val-d'Or	Quebec	CA	34,037	33,871	+0.49%	3539.98	9.6
79	82	Orillia	Ontario	CA	33,411	31,166	+7.20%	28.53	1,171.1
80	80	Stratford	Ontario	CA	33,232	31,470	+5.60%	30.02	1,107.0
81	79	Owen Sound	Ontario	CA	32,712	31,820	+2.80%	624.18	52.4
82	86	Winkler	Manitoba	CA	32,655	30,297	+7.78%	872.19	37.4
83	92	Whitehorse	Yukon	CA	31,913	28,225	+13.07%	8465.21	3.8
84	81	Brockville	Ontario	CA	31,661	31,200	+1.48%	576.87	54.9
85	83	Bathurst	New Brunswick	CA	31,387	31,110	+0.89%	2100.05	14.9
86	93	Centre Wellington	Ontario	CA	31,093	28,191	+10.29%	409.41	75.9
87	88	Parksville	British Columbia	CA	31,054	28,922	+7.37%	81.81	379.6
88	87	Okotoks	Alberta	CA	30,405	29,016	+4.79%	38.55	788.7
89	85	Alma	Quebec	CA	30,331	30,771	−1.43%	194.92	155.6
90	89	Rivière-du-Loup	Quebec	CA	30,025	28,902	+3.89%	543.02	55.3
91	84	Corner Brook	Newfoundland and Labrador	CA	29,762	30,969	−3.90%	1122.58	26.5
92	91	Fort St. John	British Columbia	CA	28,729	28,396	+1.17%	617.73	46.5
93	95	Thetford Mines	Quebec	CA	28,287	27,564	+2.62%	405.92	69.7
94	99	Midland	Ontario	CA	27,894	25,826	+8.01%	60.75	459.2
95	90	Sept-Îles	Quebec	CA	27,729	28,534	−2.82%	1750.44	15.8
96	96	Miramichi	New Brunswick	CA	27,593	27,518	+0.27%	7564.06	3.6
97	98	Cranbrook	British Columbia	CA	27,040	26,068	+3.73%	4563.87	5.9
98	97	Kentville	Nova Scotia	CA	26,929	26,222	+2.70%	607.05	44.4
99	94	Baie-Comeau	Quebec	CA	26,643	27,692	−3.79%	682.89	39.0
100	100	Port Alberni	British Columbia	CA	25,786	24,669	+4.53%	1633.13	15.8
101	107	Wasaga Beach	Ontario	CA	24,862	20,675	+20.25%	57.42	433.0
102	105	Collingwood	Ontario	CA	24,811	21,793	+13.85%	33.15	748.4
103	110	Squamish	British Columbia	CA	24,232	19,893	+21.81%	105.43	229.8
104	101	Pembroke	Ontario	CA	23,814	23,269	+2.34%	553.40	43.0
105	103	Williams Lake	British Columbia	CA	23,608	23,113	+2.14%	12422.14	1.9
106	102	Quesnel	British Columbia	CA	23,113	23,146	−0.14%	21708.62	1.1
107	106	Essa	Ontario	CA	22,970	21,083	+8.95%	279.92	82.1
108	104	Edmundston	New Brunswick	CA	22,144	21,955	+0.86%	1582.36	14.0
109	112	Cobourg	Ontario	CA	20,519	19,440	+5.55%	22.41	915.6
110	111	Yellowknife	Northwest Territories	CA	20,340	19,569	+3.94%	103.37	196.8
111	120	Sainte-Agathe-des-Monts	Quebec	CA	19,892	18,010	+10.45%	210.96	94.3
112	109	Yorkton	Saskatchewan	CA	19,859	19,927	−0.34%	1623.32	12.2
113	121	Salmon Arm	British Columbia	CA	19,705	17,904	+10.06%	165.42	119.1
114	113	Terrace	British Columbia	CA	19,606	19,160	+2.33%	9721.84	2.0
115	108	North Battleford	Saskatchewan	CA	19,374	20,052	−3.38%	1118.54	17.3
116	119	Nelson	British Columbia	CA	19,119	18,307	+4.44%	1224.30	15.6
117	116	Amos	Quebec	CA	18,873	18,872	+0.01%	2298.16	8.2
118	117	Camrose	Alberta	CA	18,772	18,742	+0.16%	41.67	450.5
119	118	Swift Current	Saskatchewan	CA	18,745	18,536	+1.13%	1129.78	16.6
120	127	Tillsonburg	Ontario	CA	18,615	15,872	+17.28%	22.20	838.5
121	114	Matane	Quebec	CA	18,474	18,894	−2.22%	865.87	21.3
122	122	Petawawa	Ontario	CA	18,160	17,187	+5.66%	164.70	110.3
123	123	Summerside	Prince Edward Island	CA	18,157	16,831	+7.88%	125.12	145.1
124	115	Dawson Creek	British Columbia	CA	17,878	18,890	−5.36%	11716.80	1.5
125	124	Powell River	British Columbia	CA	17,825	16,783	+6.21%	799.80	22.3
126	126	Steinbach	Manitoba	CA	17,806	16,022	+11.13%	37.56	474.1
127	125	Port Hope	Ontario	CA	17,294	16,753	+3.23%	278.80	62.0
128	129	Sylvan Lake	Alberta	CA	16,514	15,302	+7.92%	24.25	681.0
129	136	Canmore	Alberta	CA	15,990	13,992	+14.28%	68.47	233.5
130	132	Ladysmith	British Columbia	CA	15,501	14,572	+6.38%	412.01	37.6
131	128	Dolbeau-Mistassini	Quebec	CA	15,306	15,750	−2.82%	647.75	23.6
132	139	Cowansville	Quebec	CA	15,234	13,656	+11.56%	46.87	325.0
133	130	Kenora	Ontario	CA	14,967	15,096	−0.85%	211.65	70.7
134	133	Brooks	Alberta	CA	14,924	14,451	+3.27%	18.21	819.5
135	137	Strathmore	Alberta	CA	14,339	13,756	+4.24%	26.98	531.5
136	141	High River	Alberta	CA	14,324	13,594	+5.37%	22.19	645.5
137	134	Trail	British Columbia	CA	14,268	14,196	+0.51%	279.13	51.1
138	147	Lachute	Quebec	CA	14,100	12,862	+9.63%	108.66	129.8
139	135	Grand Falls-Windsor	Newfoundland and Labrador	CA	13,853	14,171	−2.24%	54.84	252.6
140	148	Ingersoll	Ontario	CA	13,693	12,757	+7.34%	12.73	1,075.6
141	143	Prince Rupert	British Columbia	CA	13,442	13,462	−0.15%	3303.63	4.1
142	145	Gander	Newfoundland and Labrador	CA	13,414	13,234	+1.36%	2412.67	5.6
143	146	Lacombe	Alberta	CA	13,396	13,057	+2.60%	20.59	650.6
144	131	Campbellton	New Brunswick	CA	13,330	14,679	−9.19%	1525.45	8.7
145	144	Portage la Prairie	Manitoba	CA	13,270	13,304	−0.26%	24.72	536.8
146	142	Sainte-Marie	Quebec	CA	13,134	13,565	−3.18%	107.55	122.1
147	138	Thompson	Manitoba	CA	13,035	13,678	−4.70%	16.62	784.3
148	140	Estevan	Saskatchewan	CA	12,798	13,615	−6.00%	793.36	16.1
149	149	Wetaskiwin	Alberta	CA	12,594	12,655	−0.48%	18.75	671.7
150	150	Weyburn	Saskatchewan	CA	12,247	12,055	+1.59%	828.28	14.8
151	151	Hawkesbury	Ontario/Quebec	CA	12,010	11,974	+0.30%	12.91	930.3
152	152	Elliot Lake	Ontario	CA	11,372	10,741	+5.87%	696.06	16.3

== See also ==
- List of Canadian census agglomerations by province or territory
- List of census agglomerations in Canada
- List of the largest municipalities in Canada by population
- List of the largest population centres in Canada
- Population of Canada by year
