= Last Mountain Lake 80A =

Indian reserve in Saskatchewan, Canada

Coordinates: 50°47′04″N 105°01′28″W

- Indian reserve
- Last Mountain Lake Indian Reserve No. 80A
- Location in Saskatchewan
- First Nations: Day Star; George Gordon; Kawacatoose; Muscowpetung; Muskowekwan; Pasqua; Piapot
- Country: Canada
- Province: Saskatchewan

Area
  - Total: 508.2 ha (1,256 acres)

Last Mountain Lake 80A is a shared Indian reserve in Saskatchewan, used by the Day Star, George Gordon, Kawacatoose, Muscowpetung, Muskowekwan, Pasqua, and Piapot First Nations. It is in Township 21, Range 21, west of the Second Meridian.

The reserve is located on the western shore of Last Mountain Lake, on the west side of Regina Beach. It surrounds Little Arm Bay, which is where Arm River flows into the lake. The hamlet of Kinookimaw is with the reserve.

== See also ==
- List of Indian reserves in Saskatchewan
