= Deer Valley, Saskatchewan =

Deer Valley
- Organized hamlet
- Organized Hamlet of Deer Valley
- Location within Saskatchewan Location within Canada
- Coordinates: 50.596°N 104.885°W
- Country: Canada
- Province: Saskatchewan
- Census division: 6
- Rural municipality (RM): Lumsden No. 189
- Designated (organized hamlet): December 31, 2016

Government
  - Governing body: RM of Lumsden Council
  - Hamlet board chair: Kristen Abel
- Time zone: UTC-6 (CST)
- Area code: 306
- Website: Official website

Deer Valley is an organized hamlet in the Rural Municipality of Lumsden No. 189, Saskatchewan, Canada. It is approximately 25 km (16 mi) northwest of Regina and 6 km (3.7 mi) south of the Town of Lumsden.

== History ==
The development of the Deer Valley community began in 1998. It was established as an organized hamlet on December 31, 2016.

== Government ==
Deer Valley has a three-member organized hamlet board that is chaired by Kristen Abel. The board reports to the Rural Municipality of Lumsden No. 189 as its administering municipality.
