= Saskatoon metropolitan area =

Coordinates: 52.126°N 106.660°W

- Census metropolitan area
- Saskatoon Census Metropolitan Area
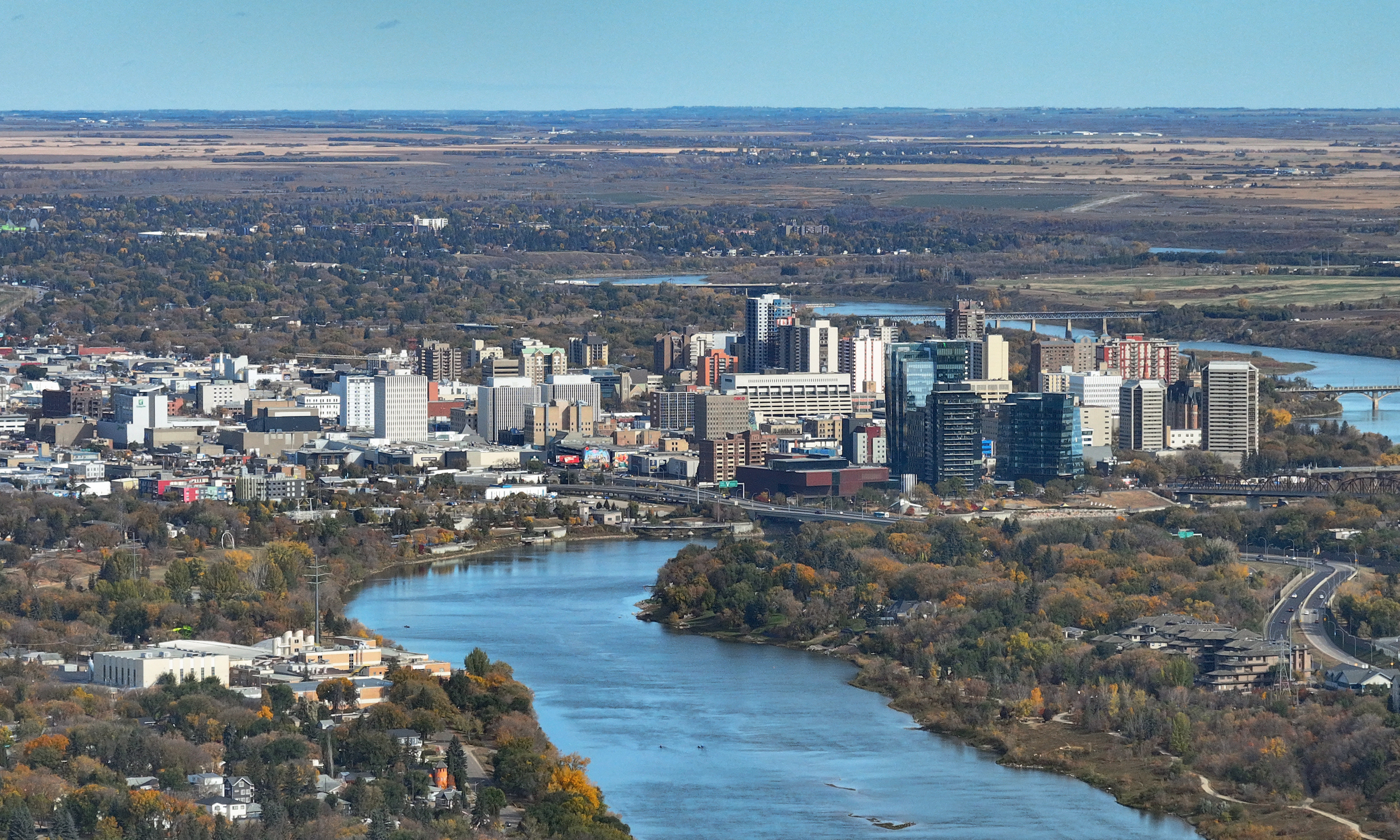
- Skyline of Saskatoon
Interactive Map of Saskatoon, SK CMA
City of Saskatoon
Saskatoon, SK CMA
- Country: Canada
- Province: Saskatchewan
- Urban municipalities: List: Town of Aberdeen; Town of Allan; Town of Dalmeny; Town of Delisle; Town of Dundurn; Town of Hague; Town of Langham; City of Martensville; Town of Osler; Town of Rosthern; City of Saskatoon; Town of Waldheim; City of Warman

Area
  - Total: 5,864.48 km^{2} (2,264.29 sq mi)

Population (2021)
  - Total: 317,480
  - Density: 50.1/km^{2} (130/sq mi)
- Canadian CD rank: 17th

Gross Metropolitan Product
  - Saskatoon CMA: CA$20.2 billion (2020)
- Time zone: UTC-6 (Central Time)
- Postal Code: S
- Area codes: 306, 639

The Saskatoon metropolitan area is the census metropolitan area (CMA) of Saskatoon, Saskatchewan. In 2021, Statistics Canada counted the CMA's population to be 317,480.

The area is served by the Saskatoon John G. Diefenbaker International Airport, the 13th busiest airport in the country.

Unlike many major North American urbanized areas, yet similarly to other prairie centres in Canada, Saskatoon has absorbed numerous neighbouring communities in its history. In the past, when the city limits reached the borders of neighbouring municipalities, such as Sutherland and Nutana, they were simply annexed into Saskatoon's jurisdiction. The vast majority of the region's inhabitants reside within the City of Saskatoon, which now has a population in excess of 270,000.

== Geography ==
Census metropolitan area (CMA) is the term Statistics Canada uses to determine the demographics of greater Saskatoon (as well as other large Canadian cities). The Saskatoon CMA includes the City of Saskatoon, Rural Municipality of Corman Park No. 344, the cities of Martensville and Warman, and other smaller communities within the region.

According to Canada's 2021 census, the Saskatoon CMA has surpassed a quarter of a million people and is the 17th largest metropolitan area in the country with an estimated population of 317,480. It is also the largest CMA in Saskatchewan and has a land area of 5,864 square kilometres (2,264 sq mi).

=== List of municipalities ===
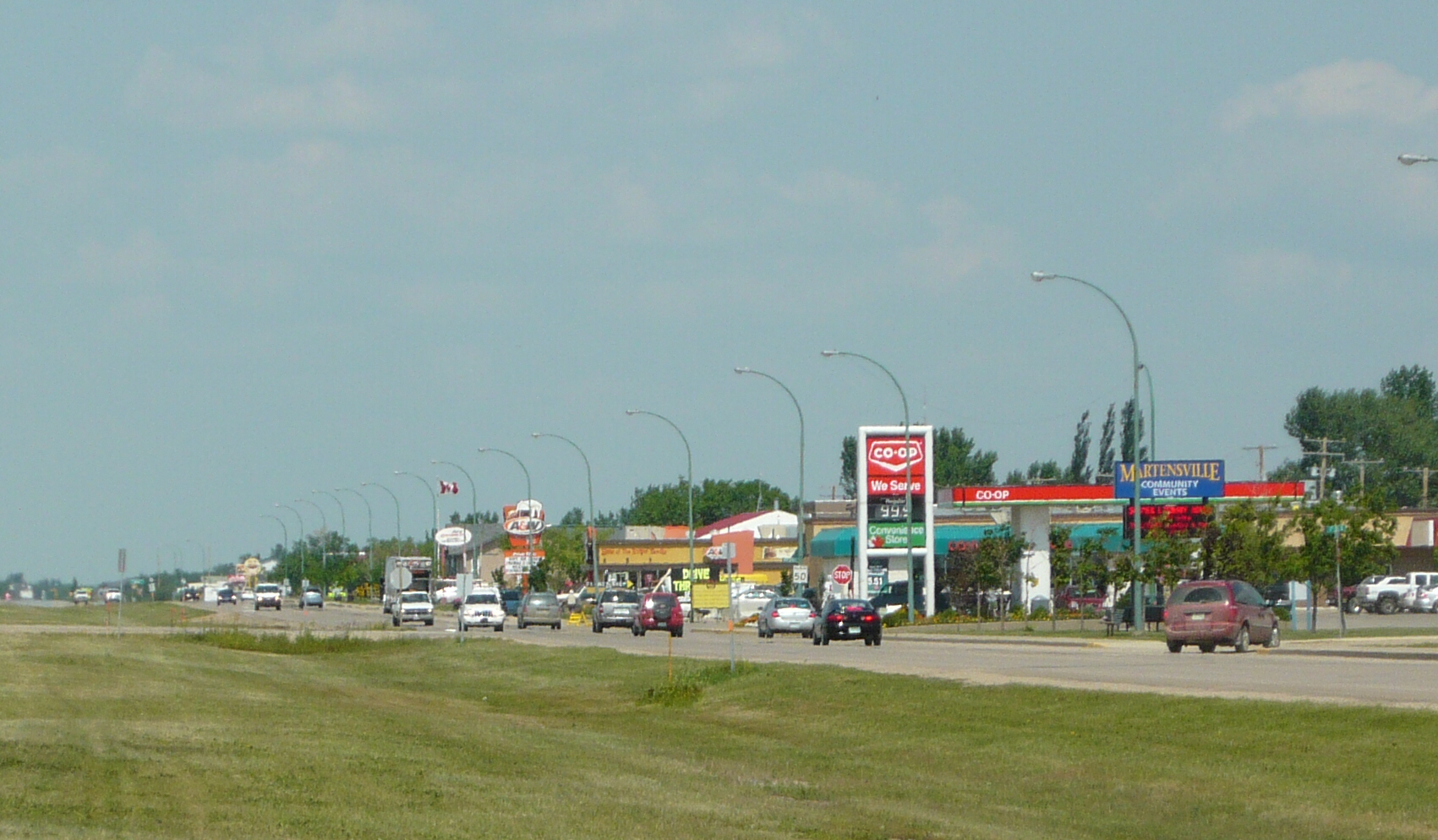
Martensville

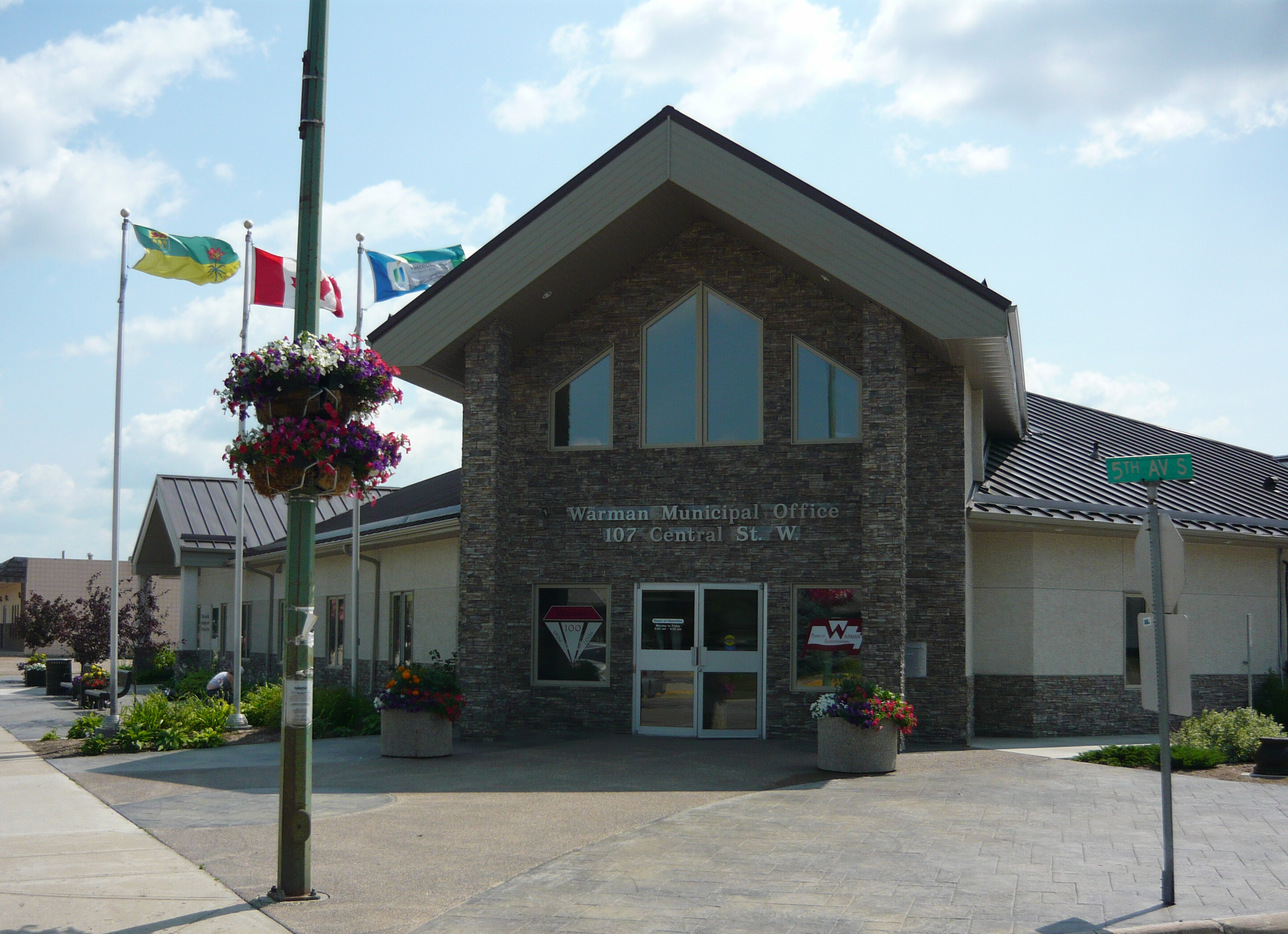
Warman municipal office

Municipality	2021 population	2016 population
Cities
Martensville	10,549	9,655
Saskatoon	266,141	247,201
Warman	12,419	11,020
Towns
Aberdeen	716	662
Allan	625	644
Asquith	624	639
Colonsay	446	451
Dalmeny	1,766	1,826
Delisle	1,024	1,038
Dundurn	675	611
Langham	1,518	1,496
Osler	1,251	1,237
Villages
Bradwell	164	166
Clavet	450	310
Meacham	96	99
Vanscoy	477	462
Resort villages
Shields	351	288
Thode	163	157
Rural municipalities
Aberdeen No. 373	1,461	1,379
Blucher No. 343	1,984	2,006
Colonsay No. 342	260	269
Corman Park No. 344	8,909	8,558
Dundurn No. 314	2,101	2,404
Vanscoy No. 345	2,799	2,840
Indian reserves
Whitecap	511	451

== Demographics ==
=== Ethnicity ===
Panethnic groups in Metro Saskatoon (2001−2021)
Panethnic group	2021		2016		2011		2006		2001	
Panethnic group	Pop.	%	Pop.	%	Pop.	%	Pop.	%	Pop.	%
European (Note: 2001-2016: Statistic includes all persons that did not make up part of a visible minority or an indigenous identity. 2021: Statistic includes all persons belonging to the non-indigenous and non-visible minority “White” population group.)	210,365	67.53%	208,265	72.09%	203,900	79.51%	194,450	84.23%	189,945	85.32%
Indigenous	34,890	11.2%	31,345	10.85%	23,895	9.32%	21,535	9.33%	20,275	9.11%
South Asian	19,370	6.22%	13,670	4.73%	6,060	2.36%	2,230	0.97%	1,850	0.83%
Southeast Asian (Note: Statistic includes total responses of "Filipino" and "Southeast Asian" under visible minority section on census.)	18,360	5.89%	13,650	4.72%	8,740	3.41%	2,925	1.27%	2,595	1.17%
East Asian (Note: Statistic includes total responses of "Chinese", "Korean", and "Japanese" under visible minority section on census.)	10,405	3.34%	8,820	3.05%	6,060	2.36%	4,685	2.03%	4,285	1.92%
African	8,645	2.78%	5,580	1.93%	2,550	0.99%	1,900	0.82%	1,520	0.68%
Middle Eastern (Note: Statistic includes total responses of "West Asian" and "Arab" under visible minority section on census.)	4,800	1.54%	3,530	1.22%	2,510	0.98%	1,605	0.7%	830	0.37%
Latin American	2,740	0.88%	2,065	0.71%	1,305	0.51%	1,050	0.45%	845	0.38%
Other/Multiracial (Note: Statistic includes total responses of "Visible minority, n.i.e." and "Multiple visible minorities" under visible minority section on census.)	2,230	0.72%	1,980	0.69%	1,415	0.55%	465	0.2%	495	0.22%
Total responses	311,515	98.12%	288,900	97.9%	256,435	98.4%	230,850	98.69%	222,635	98.54%
Total population	317,480	100%	295,095	100%	260,600	100%	233,923	100%	225,927	100%
Note: Totals greater than 100% due to multiple origin responses

=== Language ===
The question on knowledge of languages allows for multiple responses. The following figures are from the 2021 Canadian Census, and lists languages that were selected by at least 500 respondents.

Knowledge of Languages in Metro Saskatoon
Language	2021	
Language	Pop.	%
English	307,680	98.77%
French	19,065	6.12%
Tagalog	12,390	3.98%
Mandarin	6,430	2.06%
Urdu	5,835	1.87%
Hindi	5,700	1.83%
Punjabi	5,430	1.74%
Spanish	4,925	1.58%
Arabic	3,855	1.24%
Ukrainian	3,750	1.2%
German	3,555	1.14%
Gujarati	2,545	0.82%
Bengali	2,475	0.79%
Cantonese	2,420	0.78%
Russian	2,075	0.67%
Cree	1,995	0.64%
Vietnamese	1,965	0.63%
Aramaic	1,075	0.35%
Ilocano	820	0.26%
Plautdietsch	820	0.26%
Iranian; Persian	795	0.26%
Malayalam	770	0.25%
Portuguese	765	0.25%
Polish	720	0.23%
Serbo-Croatian	695	0.22%
Cebuano	645	0.21%
Italian	580	0.19%
Tigrigna	575	0.18%
Nepali	540	0.17%
Japanese	535	0.17%
Korean	535	0.17%
Romanian	515	0.17%
Afrikaans	505	0.16%
Total Responses	311,520	98.12%
Total Population	317,480	100%

=== Religion ===
Religious groups in Metro Saskatoon (1981−2021)
Religious group	2021		2011		2001		1991		1981	
Religious group	Pop.	%	Pop.	%	Pop.	%	Pop.	%	Pop.	%
Christianity	164,170	52.7%	172,625	67.32%	174,855	78.54%	175,000	84.21%	136,495	89.64%
Irreligion	118,760	38.12%	71,550	27.9%	42,490	19.09%	29,165	14.03%	13,970	9.17%
Islam	13,100	4.21%	5,680	2.21%	1,140	0.51%	460	0.22%	305	0.2%
Hinduism	5,260	1.69%	1,645	0.64%	700	0.31%	600	0.29%	325	0.21%
Sikhism	3,365	1.08%	610	0.24%	180	0.08%	230	0.11%	240	0.16%
Buddhism	2,000	0.64%	1,700	0.66%	1,435	0.64%	930	0.45%	315	0.21%
Judaism	590	0.19%	440	0.17%	325	0.15%	615	0.3%	540	0.35%
Indigenous spirituality	1,880	0.6%	1,150	0.45%	—N/a	—N/a	—N/a	—N/a	—N/a	—N/a
Other	2,390	0.77%	1,035	0.4%	1,510	0.68%	815	0.39%	70	0.05%
Total responses	311,520	98.12%	256,435	98.4%	222,630	98.54%	207,825	98.95%	152,265	98.74%
Total population	317,480	100%	260,600	100%	225,927	100%	210,023	100%	154,210	100%

== See also ==
- Regina metropolitan area
