= Pasqua Lake =

Lake in Saskatchewan, Canada

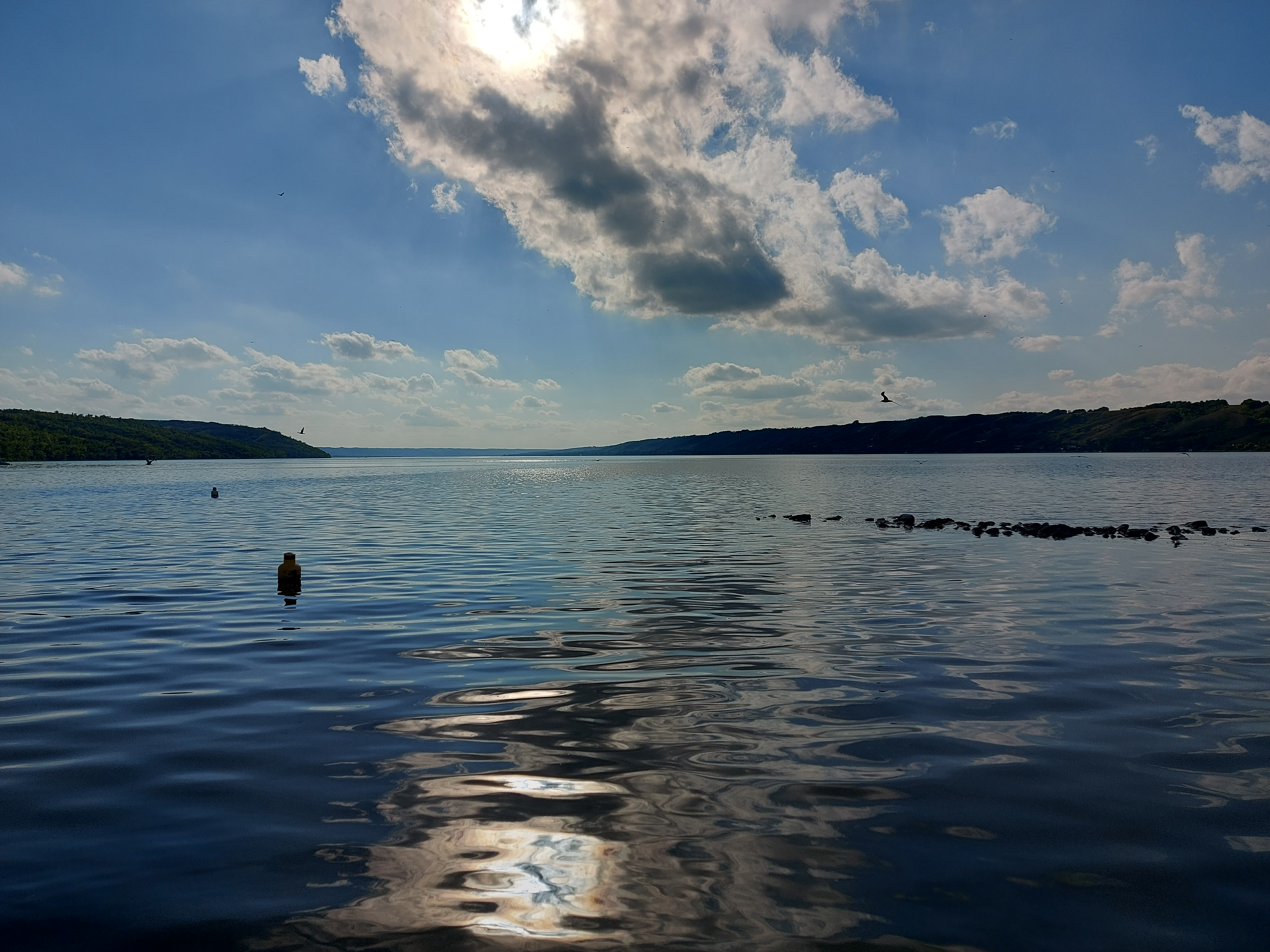
- Pasqua Lake

- Location in Saskatchewan Pasqua Lake (Canada)
- Location: Saskatchewan
- Group: Fishing Lakes
- Coordinates: 50°46′30″N 103°59′33″W
- Part of: Red River drainage basin
- Primary inflows: Qu'Appelle River
- Primary outflows: Qu'Appelle River at Sioux Crossing
- Basin countries: Canada
- Max. length: 16.1 km (10.0 mi)
- Max. width: 1.6 km (0.99 mi)
- Surface area: 3,110.2 ha (7,685 acres)
- Average depth: 5.8 m (19 ft)
- Max. depth: 18.3 m (60 ft)
- Water volume: 120,932 dam^{3} (98,041 acre⋅ft)
- Shore length^{1}: 40 km (25 mi)
- Surface elevation: 475 m (1,558 ft)
- Settlements: Pasqua Lake
- ^{1} Shore length is not a well-defined measure.

Pasqua Lake is a lake along the course of the Qu'Appelle River in the Canadian province of Saskatchewan. Pasqua Lake was named after Chief Joseph Pasqua who formed what became the Pasqua First Nation. It is one of four lakes that make up the Fishing Lakes, which are all in the Qu'Appelle Valley. The Qu'Appelle Valley was formed about 14,000 years ago during the last ice age as meltwater from the glaciers carved out the valley. As water levels rose and fell, alluvium was left in the wake. These piles of alluvium are what created the separations between the lakes.

== Description ==
Pasqua Lake is the farthest west and upstream of the four Fishing Lakes. The Qu'Appelle River enters the lake at the far western end and exits the lake at the eastern end through Sioux Crossing. Sioux Crossing is a short channel cut through the isthmus that separates Pasqua from Echo Lake. While the Qu'Appelle River is the primary inflow for the lake, other smaller creeks flow into the lake from the numerous coulees lining the lake's shore. Jumping Deer Creek is the only other named inflow and it flows into the lake at the north-east corner of the lake through the Pasqua Indian Reserve near Sioux Crossing.

Highways 210 and 727 provide access to the lake.

== Communities ==
Along most of the northern shore of Pasqua Lake is the RM of North Qu'Appelle No. 187 and along most of the southern shore is the Pasqua Indian Reserve. The Standing Buffalo Indian reserve is at the north-east corner of the lake, on the north side of the Sioux Crossing. Echo Valley Provincial Park is at the south-east corner of the lake, on the south side of Sioux Crossing. At the south-west end of the lake is the Muscowpetung Indian reserve. The resort village of Pasqua Lake is the only community outside the Indian reserves on the lake.

== Recreation ==
Pasqua Lake has four boat launches, two of which are at Echo Valley Provincial Park. The lake is great for fishing and the most commonly caught fish are northern pike, walleye, and yellow perch. Along the northern shore of the lake, just east of Pasqua, is Camp Lutherland, which is a Christian camp available for church groups, family gatherings, and other events.

== Gallery ==
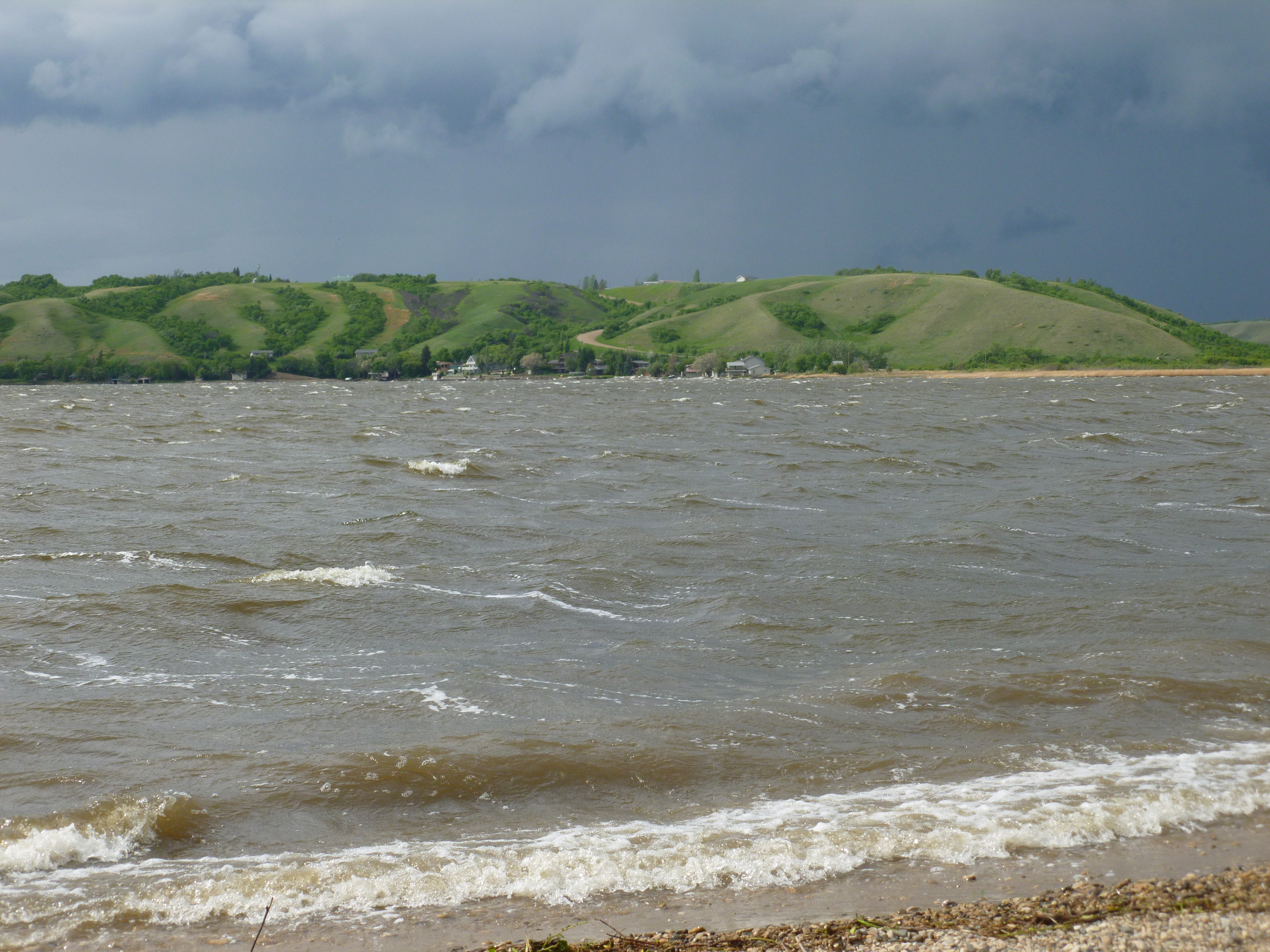
Pasqua Lake

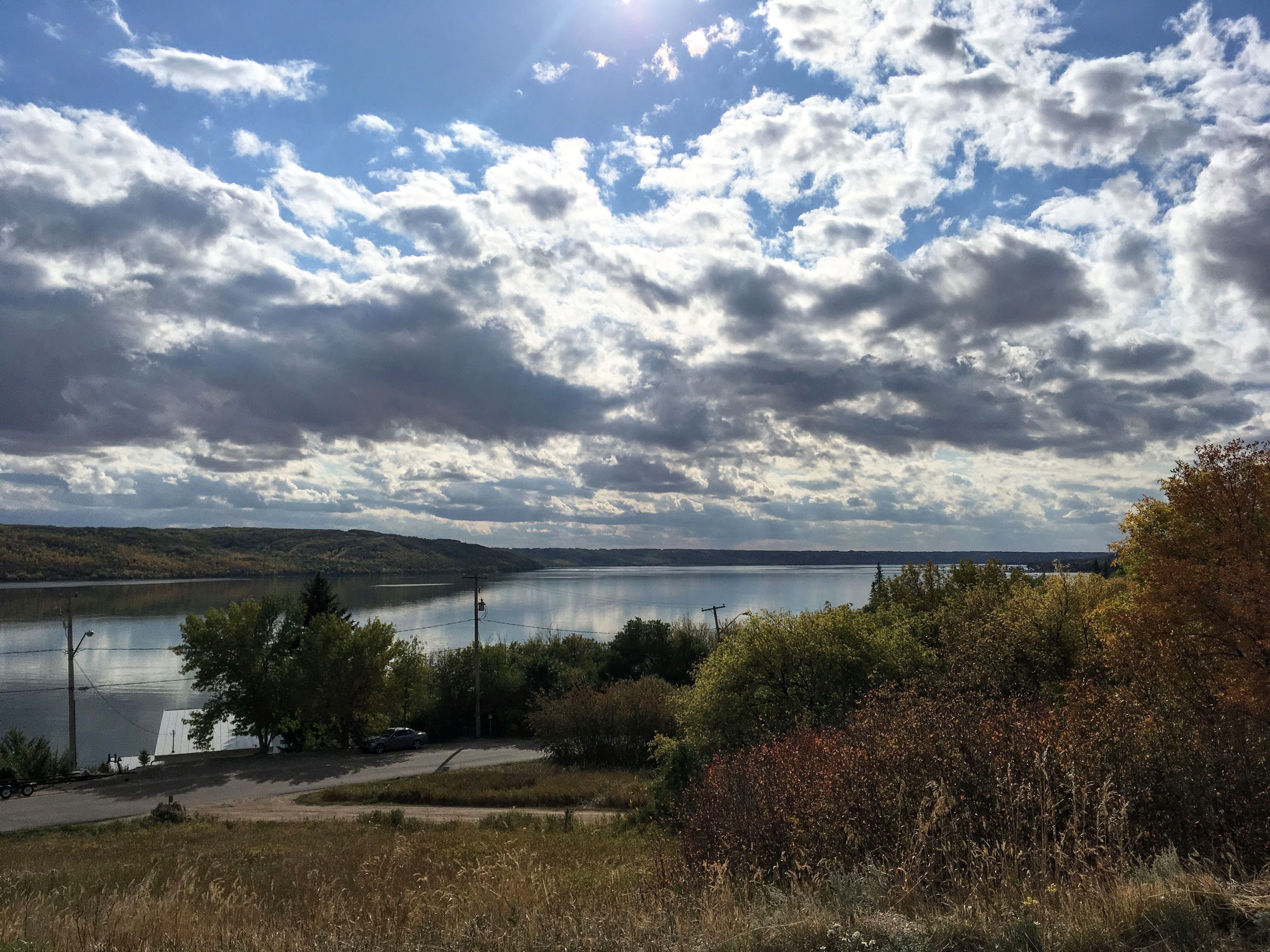
Pasqua Lake viewed from the community of Pasqua Lake

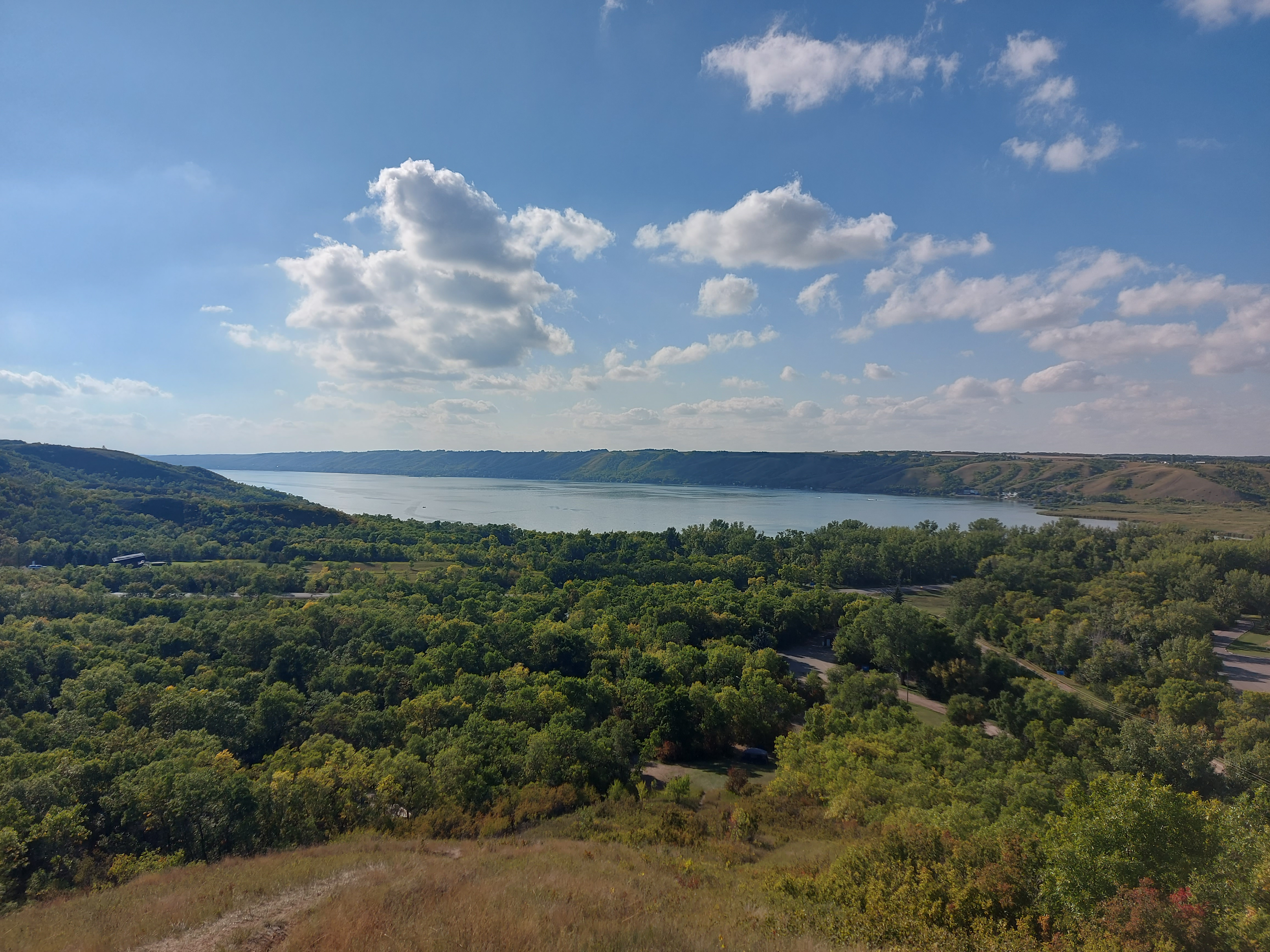
Pasqua Lake viewed from Echo Valley Provincial Park

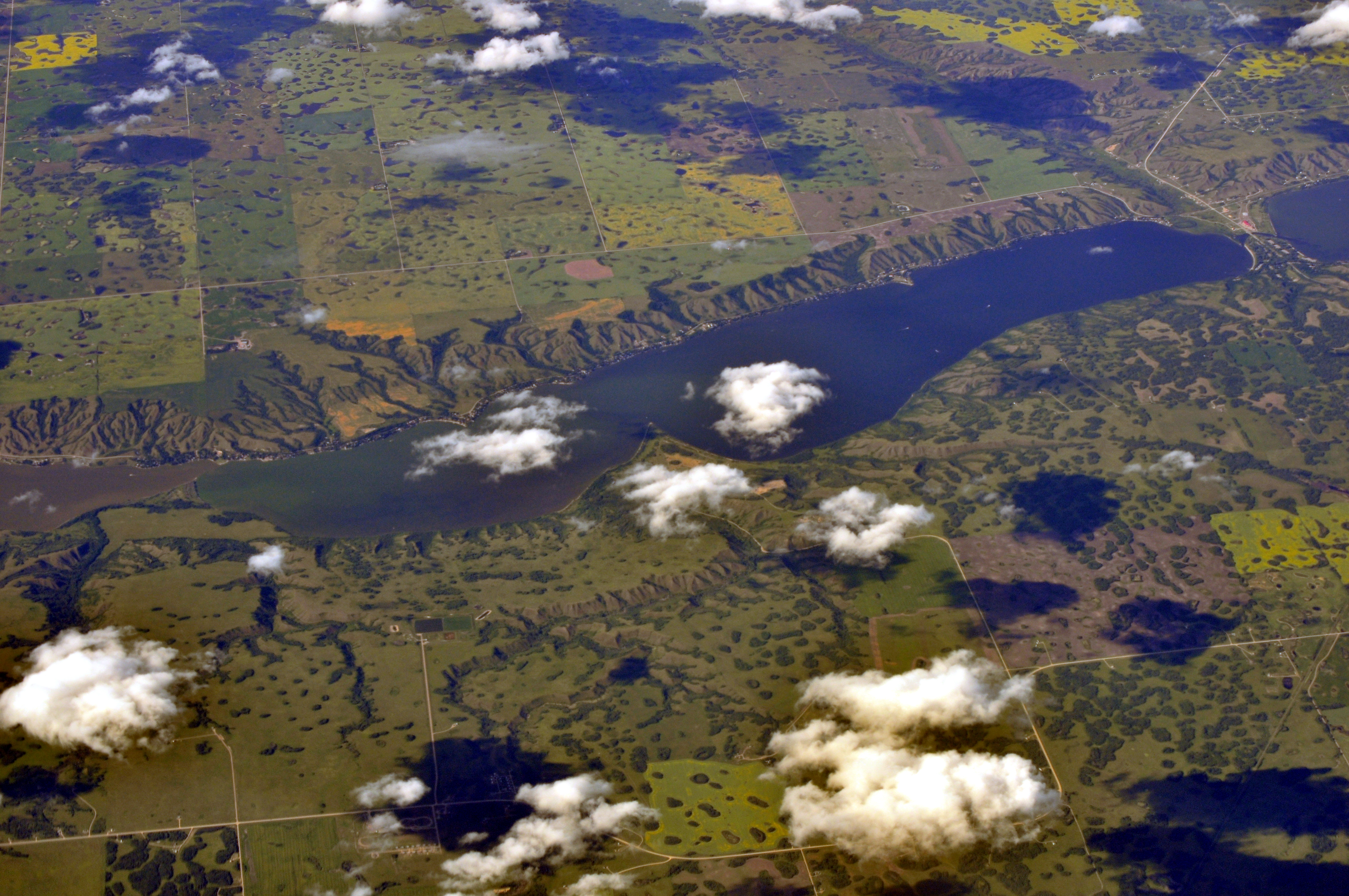
Aerial view from the south of Pasqua Lake

== See also ==
- List of lakes of Saskatchewan
- Tourism in Saskatchewan
