= Buena Vista, Saskatchewan =

Village in Saskatchewan, Canada

Buena Vista
- Village
- Village of Buena Vista
- Location of Buena Vista in Saskatchewan Buena Vista (Canada)
- Coordinates: 50°47′00″N 104°56′30″W
- Country: Canada
- Province: Saskatchewan
- Region: East-Central
- Census division: 9
- Rural municipality: Lumsden No. 189

Government
  - Type: Municipal
  - Governing body: Buena Vista Village Council
  - Mayor: Gary McLennan
  - Administrator: Lorna Davies

Area
  - Land: 3.63 km^{2} (1.40 sq mi)

Population (2021)
  - Total: 646
  - Density: 178/km^{2} (460/sq mi)
- Time zone: UTC-6 (CST)
  - Summer (DST): UTC-6 (CST)
- Postal code: S2V 1A2
- Area codes: 306 / 639
- Highways: Highway 54
- Railways: none

Buena Vista (2016 population: 612) is a village in the Canadian province of Saskatchewan within the Rural Municipality of Lumsden No. 189 and Census Division No. 6. The village is located 40 kilometres (25 mi) north-west of Regina, on the southern shore of Last Mountain Lake just off Highway 54. It is bounded to the west by Regina Beach, demarcated by 16 Street.

== History ==
Buena Vista incorporated as a village on November 18, 1983. Its name is Spanish for "beautiful view".

== Demographics ==
Population history (1971–2021)
Year	Pop.	±%
1971	28	—
1976	60	+114.3%
1981	112	+86.7%
1986	186	+66.1%
1991	276	+48.4%
1996	343	+24.3%
2001	397	+15.7%
2006	490	+23.4%
2011	524	+6.9%
2016	612	+16.8%
2021	646	+5.6%
Source: Statistics Canada via Saskatchewan Bureau of Statistics

In the 2021 Census of Population conducted by Statistics Canada, Buena Vista had a population of 646 living in 279 of its 424 total private dwellings, a change of 5.6% from its 2016 population of 612. With a land area of 3.63 km^{2} (1.40 sq mi), it had a population density of 178.0/km^{2} (460.9/sq mi) in 2021.

In the 2016 Census of Population, the Village of Buena Vista recorded a population of 612 living in 255 of its 417 total private dwellings, a 14.4% change from its 2011 population of 524. With a land area of 3.61 km^{2} (1.39 sq mi), it had a population density of 169.5/km^{2} (439.1/sq mi) in 2016.

== See also ==
- List of communities in Saskatchewan
- List of villages in Saskatchewan
- Tourism in Saskatchewan
