= Pasqua 79 =

Indian reserve in Saskatchewan, Canada

Coordinates: 50°44′54″N 104°00′59″W

- Indian reserve
- Pasqua Indian Reserve No. 79
- Location in Saskatchewan
- First Nation: Pasqua
- Country: Canada
- Province: Saskatchewan

Area
  - Total: 9,089.5 ha (22,461 acres)

Population (2016)
  - Total: 517
  - Density: 5.69/km^{2} (14.7/sq mi)
- Community Well-Being Index: 56

Pasqua 79 is an Indian reserve of the Pasqua First Nation in Saskatchewan. It is about 16 kilometres (9.9 mi) west of Fort Qu'Appelle. In the 2016 Canadian Census, it recorded a population of 517 living in 173 of its 200 total private dwellings. In the same year, its Community Well-Being index was calculated at 56 of 100, compared to 58.4 for the average First Nations community and 77.5 for the average non-Indigenous community.

The reserve is located on the south side of Pasqua Lake in the Qu'Appelle Valley.

== Land reductions ==
The initial reserve allotment was 60.2 square miles (156 km^{2}) but as a result of land surrenders and government expropriations, this has since been reduced by nearly half to about 36 square miles (93 km^{2})

== See also ==
- List of Indian reserves in Saskatchewan
