= Deer Valley High School =

Deer Valley High School may refer to:

- Deer Valley High School (California)
- Deer Valley High School (Arizona)
