= Ugolino Vivaldi Pasqua =

Italian aviation pioneer

Ugolino Vivaldi Pasqua (July 2, 1885 – October 20, 1910) was an Italian aviation pioneer and the first Italian aviation fatality.

== Sources ==
- Mauro Antonellini Salvat ubi lucet - La base idrovolanti di Porto Corsini e i suoi uomini. Casanova Editore Faenza
