= Rural Municipality of Lumsden No. 189 =

Rural municipality in Saskatchewan, Canada

Lumsden No. 189
- Rural municipality
- Rural Municipality of Lumsden No. 189
- Location of the RM of Lumsden No. 189 in Saskatchewan
- Coordinates: 50°40′48″N 104°45′0″W
- Country: Canada
- Province: Saskatchewan
- Census division: 6
- SARM division: 2
- Formed: December 9, 1912

Government
  - Reeve: Kent Farago
  - Governing body: RM of Lumsden No. 189 Council
  - Administrator: Monica Merkosky
  - Office location: Lumsden

Area (2016)
  - Land: 817.13 km^{2} (315.50 sq mi)

Population (2016)
  - Total: 1,938
  - Density: 2.4/km^{2} (6.2/sq mi)
- Time zone: CST
  - Summer (DST): CST
- Area codes: 306 and 639

The Rural Municipality of Lumsden No. 189 (2016 population: 1,938) is a rural municipality (RM) in the Canadian province of Saskatchewan within Census Division No. 6 and SARM Division No. 2. It is located in the south-east portion of the province.

== History ==
The RM of Lumsden No. 189 incorporated as a rural municipality on December 9, 1912. It is named after Hugh D. Lumsden who was the chief surveyor on the project in 1887 to take the railroad from Regina to Prince Albert.

== Geography ==
=== Communities and localities ===
The following urban municipalities are surrounded by the RM.

Towns

- Lumsden
- Regina Beach

Villages

- Buena Vista
- Craven
- Disley

Resort villages

- Lumsden Beach

The following unincorporated communities are within the RM.

Organized hamlets

- Deer Valley

== Transportation ==
- Saskatchewan Highway 6
- Saskatchewan Highway 11
- Saskatchewan Highway 20
- Saskatchewan Highway 54
- Saskatchewan Highway 99
- Saskatchewan Highway 641
- Saskatchewan Highway 729
- Saskatchewan Highway 734
- Regina Beach Airport

== Demographics ==
Population history (1981–2016)
Year	Pop.	±%
1981	1,188	—
1986	1,216	+2.4%
1991	1,279	+5.2%
1996	1,376	+7.6%
2001	1,646	+19.6%
2006	1,627	−1.2%
2011	1,733	+6.5%
2016	1,938	+11.8%
Source: Statistics Canada via Saskatchewan Bureau of Statistics

In the 2021 Census of Population conducted by Statistics Canada, the RM of Lumsden No. 189 had a population of 1,968 living in 742 of its 826 total private dwellings, a change of 1.5% from its 2016 population of 1,938. With a land area of 816.17 km^{2} (315.12 sq mi), it had a population density of 2.4/km^{2} (6.2/sq mi) in 2021.

In the 2016 Census of Population, the RM of Lumsden No. 189 recorded a population of 1,938 living in 712 of its 774 total private dwellings, a 9.4% change from its 2011 population of 1,772. With a land area of 817.13 km^{2} (315.50 sq mi), it had a population density of 2.4/km^{2} (6.1/sq mi) in 2016.

== Government ==
The RM of Lumsden No. 189 is governed by an elected municipal council and an appointed administrator that meets on the second and fourth Thursday of every month. The reeve of the RM is Kent Farago while its administrator is Monica Merkosky. The RM's office is located in Lumsden.

== Hidden Valley Wildlife Refuge ==
Hidden Valley Wildlife Refuge (50.7167°N 104.7172°W) is a designated provincial wildlife refuge owned and operated by the charitable Nature Regina. The 130-hectare (320-acre) refuge is in the Qu'Appelle Valley on the south side of the Qu'Appelle River near Craven. It is open to the public and access is from Highway 729. The refuge has multiple walking and hiking paths that traverse the wooded hills and coulees of the Qu'Appelle Valley.

Nature Regina originally leased the land in 1945. Nine years later, in 1954, it acquired the land. "The purpose of the Hidden Valley Sanctuary is to preserve and protect wild fauna and flora and the surface itself in a natural form".
