= Lumsden Beach =

- Resort village
- Resort Village of Lumsden Beach
- Location within Saskatchewan
- Coordinates: 50.764°N 104.899°W
- Country: Canada
- Province: Saskatchewan
- Census division: 6
- Rural municipality: RM of Lumsden No. 189
- Incorporated: July 22, 1918

Government
  - Mayor: Ross Wilson
  - Governing body: Resort Village Council
  - Administrator: Robin Tinani

Area (2021)
  - Land: 0.46 km^{2} (0.18 sq mi)

Population (2021)
  - Total: 45
  - Density: 97.8/km^{2} (253/sq mi)
- Time zone: CST
  - Summer (DST): CST
- Postal code: S0G 4C0
- Area codes: 306 and 639
- Waterway(s): Last Mountain Lake
- Website: Official website

Lumsden Beach (2021 population: 45) is a resort village in the Canadian province of Saskatchewan, Canada, within Census Division No. 6. It is on the shores of Last Mountain Lake in the Rural Municipality of Lumsden No. 189.

== History ==
Lumsden Beach incorporated as a resort village on July 22, 1918.

== Demographics ==
Population history (1951–2021)
Year	Pop.	±%
1951	2	—
1961	9	+350.0%
1966	2	−77.8%
1971	1	−50.0%
2006	40	+3900.0%
2011	10	−75.0%
2016	10	+0.0%
2021	45	+350.0%
Source: Statistics Canada via Saskatchewan Bureau of Statistics

In the 2021 Census of Population conducted by Statistics Canada, Lumsden Beach had a population of 45 living in 25 of its 76 total private dwellings, a change of 350% from its 2016 population of 10. With a land area of 0.46 km^{2} (0.18 sq mi), it had a population density of 97.8/km^{2} (253.4/sq mi) in 2021.

In the 2016 Census of Population conducted by Statistics Canada, the Resort Village of Lumsden Beach recorded a population of 10 living in 5 of its 86 total private dwellings, a 0% change from its 2011 population of 10. With a land area of 0.47 km^{2} (0.18 sq mi), it had a population density of 21.3/km^{2} (55.1/sq mi) in 2016.

== Government ==
The Resort Village of Lumsden Beach is governed by an elected municipal council and an appointed administrator. The mayor is Ross Wilson and its administrator is Robin Tinani.

== See also ==
- List of communities in Saskatchewan
- List of municipalities in Saskatchewan
- List of resort villages in Saskatchewan
- List of villages in Saskatchewan
- List of summer villages in Alberta
