= Pasqua First Nation =

Saulteaux-Cree First Nation in southern Saskatchewan, Canada

- Band No. 383
- People: Saulteaux; Cree
- Treaty: Treaty 4
- Headquarters: Pasqua
- Province: Saskatchewan

Land
- Other reserve: Pasqua 79
- Land area: 90.895 km^{2} (35.095 sq mi)

Population (2019)
- On reserve: 695
- Off reserve: 1737
- Total population: 2432

Government
- Chief: Matthew Todd Peigan

Tribal Council
- File Hills Qu'Appelle Tribal Council

Website
- pasquafn.ca

Pasqua First Nation (Cree: ᐸᐢᒁᐤ paskwâw) is a Saulteaux-Cree First Nation in southern Saskatchewan, Canada. Their reserves include:

- Last Mountain Lake 80A, shared with 6 other bands
- Pasqua 79
- Treaty Four Reserve Grounds 77, shared with 32 other bands.

== History ==
Chief Paskwa (Pis-qua, brother of Okanes) was a negotiator and signatory to Treaty 4 on 15 September 1874. He created a document of pictographs indicating his understanding of the treaty. His death in 1889 left the First Nation leaderless for 22 years.
