= Regina Beach =

Town in Saskatchewan, Canada

Town of Regina Beach
- Town
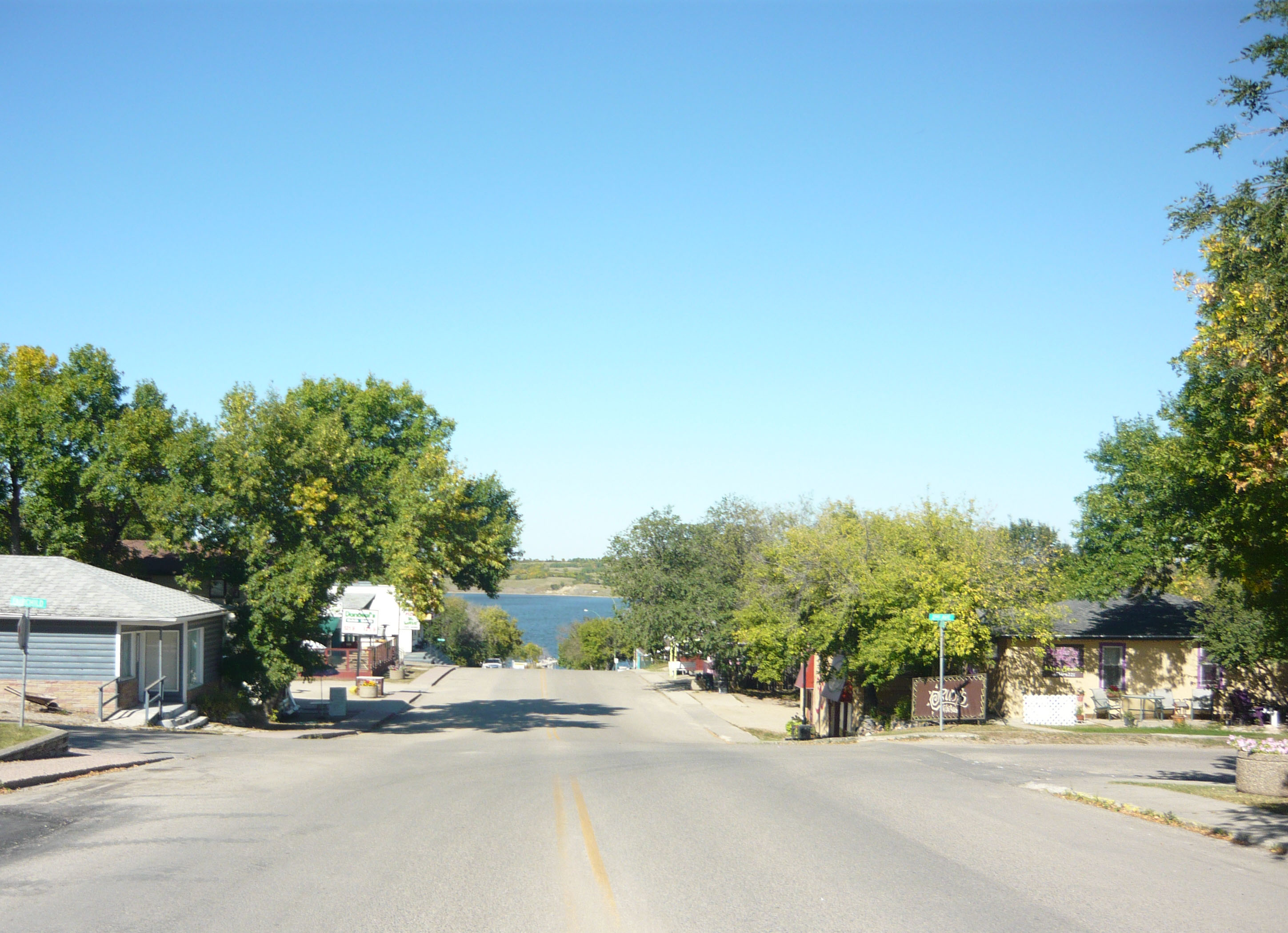
- Regina Beach, Centre Street

- Location of Regina Beach in Saskatchewan Town of Regina Beach (Canada)
- Coordinates: 50°47′11″N 104°58′28″W
- Country: Canada
- Province: Saskatchewan
- Census division: No. 8
- Rural municipality: Lumsden No. 189
- Settled: c. 1880
- Incorporated (village): 1920
- Incorporated (town): 1980

Government
  - Mayor: Cameron Hart

Area
  - Total: 2.58 km^{2} (1.00 sq mi)

Population (2011)
  - Total: 1,081
  - Density: 462.4/km^{2} (1,198/sq mi)
- Time zone: CST
- Postal code: S0G 4C0
- Area code: 306
- Website: www.reginabeach.ca

Regina Beach is a town in south central Saskatchewan, located on Highway 54, close to where Highway 11 (which connects Saskatoon to Regina) intersects with the Qu'Appelle Valley.

As Regina Beach rests on shores of the south end of Last Mountain Lake, it becomes an active lakeside resort town in summer. To the east is Buena Vista, their boundary marked by 16 Street. About 5.6 kilometres (3.5 mi) south of town in the RM of Lumsden No. 189, is the Regina Beach Airport.

== Regina Beach Recreation Site ==
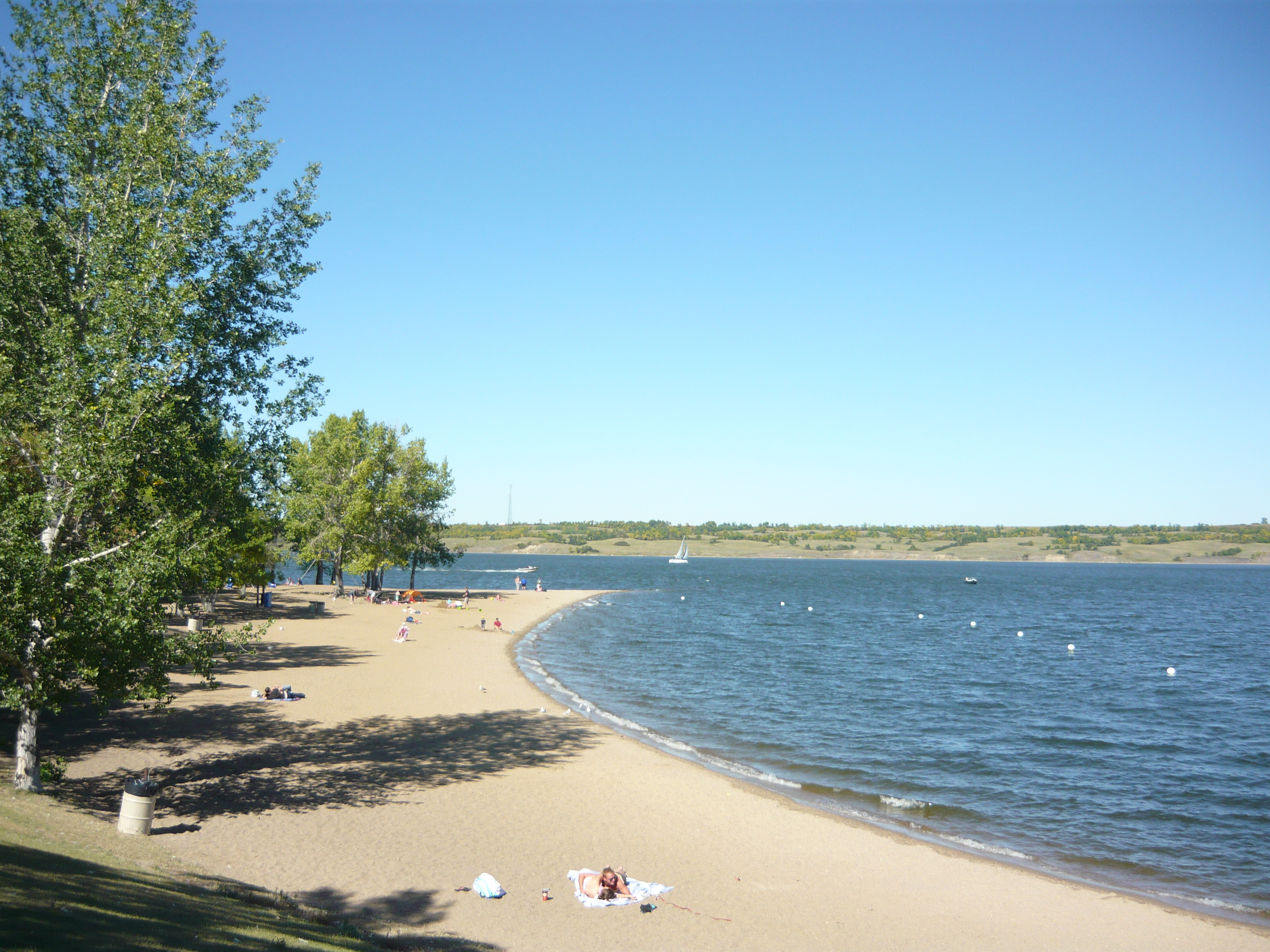
Regina Beach Recreation Site along Last Mountain Lake

Regina Beach Recreation Site (50°47′33″N 104°58′30″W) is a provincial recreation site on the western shore of Last Mountain Lake. It is operated by Sask Parks. The park runs along the lake's shore in the town of Regina Beach from Centre Street South to 16 Street. Park amenities include a large sandy beach area, picnic area, beach volleyball courts, children's playground, boat launch, and a fish filleting building. This is no overnight camping.

Just off shore, Sask Aquatic Adventures has a water adventure park set up. It is one of several in Saskatchewan.

== Regina Beach Golf Club ==
The Regina Beach Golf Club is a 9-hole golf course that opened in 1969. It runs along the south side of town and includes a restaurant and lounge. The total course length is 3,151 yd (2,881 m) and is a par 35.

== Education ==
While for most of its history Regina Beach students were bused to nearby Lumsden, in 1989 Regina Beach opened its own K-8 elementary school.

== Demographics ==
In the 2021 Census of Population conducted by Statistics Canada, Regina Beach had a population of 1,292 living in 623 of its 957 total private dwellings, a change of 12.8% from its 2016 population of 1,145. With a land area of 3.88 km^{2} (1.50 sq mi), it had a population density of 333.0/km^{2} (862.4/sq mi) in 2021.

Canada census – Regina Beach community profile

	2021	2011
Population	1,292 (+12.8% from 2016)	1081 (-10.7% from 2006)
Land area	3.88 km^{2} (1.50 sq mi)	3.88 km^{2} (1.50 sq mi)
Population density	332.7/km^{2} (862/sq mi)	278.5/km^{2} (721/sq mi)
Median age	49.6 (M: 50.4, F: 49.6)	49.7 (M: 51.3, F: 48.4)
Private dwellings	625 (total)	970 (total)
Median household income

References: 2021 2011

== See also ==
- List of towns in Saskatchewan
- List of resort villages in Saskatchewan
- List of communities in Saskatchewan
- Tourism in Saskatchewan
