= Lumsden, Saskatchewan =

Town in Saskatchewan, Canada

Lumsden
- Town
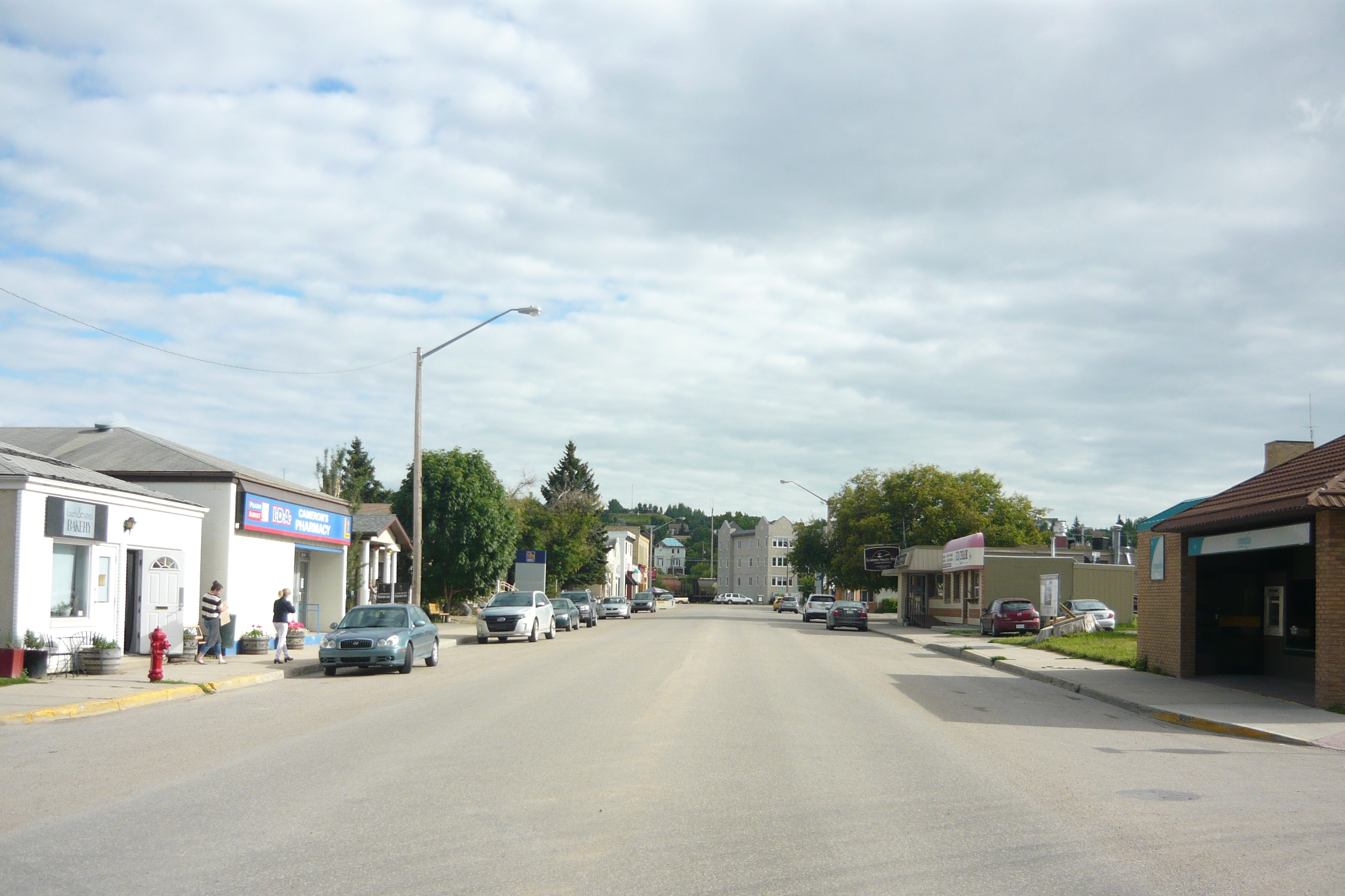
- James Street

- Location within Saskatchewan Location within Canada
- Coordinates: 50.6463°N 104.8676°W
- Country: Canada
- Province: Saskatchewan
- Census division: 6
- Rural Municipality: Lumsden No. 189
- Established: 1881
- Incorporated (Village): January 10, 1899
- Incorporated (Town): March 15, 1905

Government
  - Mayor: Verne Barber
  - Chief Administrative Officer: Monica Merkosky
  - Governing body: Town Council
  - MLA: Blaine McLeod (SKP)
  - MP: Larry Spencer (CON)

Area
  - Land: 4.92 km^{2} (1.90 sq mi)

Population (2021)
  - Total: 1,800
  - Density: 366/km^{2} (950/sq mi)
- Time zone: UTC-6 (CST)
- Postal code: S0G 3C0
- Area code: 306
- Highways: Highway 11 Highway 20
- Waterways: Qu'Appelle River
- Website: www.lumsden.ca

Lumsden is a town in the Qu'Appelle Valley in south central Saskatchewan, Canada, 31 kilometres (19 mi) northwest of the city of Regina. It is surrounded by the Rural Municipality of Lumsden No. 189. The town functions as both a farming community and an unofficial suburb of Regina. Lumsden has an active artistic community, which consists of many writers, painters, and sculptors.

== History ==
Settlers first arrived in 1881 and the area came to be commonly known as Happy Hollow. When the Qu'Appelle, Long Lake and Saskatchewan Railway came through the community in 1889, the name was changed to Lumsden after Hugh Lumsden, a senior engineer with the railway.

The town has repeatedly flooded, with major flood events occurring in 1892, 1904, 1916, 1948, and 1969. In 1974, Lumsden experienced the highest water levels in the town's history; volunteers from Regina and all surrounding communities came to help with sandbagging. The town subsequently straightened the Qu'Appelle River's channel and built dikes. The Town was at risk for flooding again in 2011 after a wet fall winter of record snowfall; however, it did not flood.

The community was chosen by Harrowsmith Magazine in 2002 as the "prettiest" town in the province.

=== Centennial ===
Official town centennial celebrations were held in March 2005. In May 2005, Lumsden hosted Queen Elizabeth II and Prince Philip, Duke of Edinburgh at the Lumsden Sports Centre. Hundreds of guests were entertained by Marny Duncan-Cary, the Lumsden Community Choir, the Riel Reelers, and the Lumsden & District Band and Jazz Ensemble. The event was held in celebration of both the town and the province's centenaries, and was the only engagement of Canada's Queen outside urban centres on that visit to Saskatchewan.

== Demographics ==
In the 2021 Census of Population conducted by Statistics Canada, Lumsden had a population of 1,800 living in 700 of its 732 total private dwellings, a change of −1.3% from its 2016 population of 1,824. With a land area of 4.92 km^{2} (1.90 sq mi), it had a population density of 365.9/km^{2} (947.6/sq mi) in 2021.

Canada census – Lumsden community profile

	2021	2011
Population	1,800 (-1.3% from 2016)	1,631 (+7.1% from 2006)
Land area	4.92 km^{2} (1.90 sq mi)	4.06 km^{2} (1.57 sq mi)
Population density	366/km^{2} (950/sq mi)	402.0/km^{2} (1,041/sq mi)
Median age	41.2 (M: 39.6, F: 42.4)	42.4 (M: 38.8, F: 45.6)
Private dwellings	732 (total) 700 (occupied)	626 (total)
Median household income	$107,000

References: 2021 2011

== Climate ==
Lumsden exhibits a continental climate (Köppen Dfb), closely bordering on a semi-arid climate (BSk)

Climate data for Lumsden
Month	Jan	Feb	Mar	Apr	May	Jun	Jul	Aug	Sep	Oct	Nov	Dec	Year
Record high °C (°F)	11.7 (53.1)	15.6 (60.1)	22.8 (73.0)	33.9 (93.0)	38.3 (100.9)	40.5 (104.9)	43.3 (109.9)	41.1 (106.0)	37.2 (99.0)	31.5 (88.7)	22.8 (73.0)	15 (59)	43.3 (109.9)
Mean daily maximum °C (°F)	−9.5 (14.9)	−6.4 (20.5)	1.7 (35.1)	12.2 (54.0)	19.9 (67.8)	24 (75)	26.4 (79.5)	25.3 (77.5)	18.3 (64.9)	11.8 (53.2)	0.3 (32.5)	−7.5 (18.5)	9.7 (49.5)
Daily mean °C (°F)	−15.2 (4.6)	−12 (10)	−3.8 (25.2)	5.4 (41.7)	12.5 (54.5)	16.8 (62.2)	19.2 (66.6)	17.8 (64.0)	11.5 (52.7)	5.2 (41.4)	−4.7 (23.5)	−13.1 (8.4)	3.3 (37.9)
Mean daily minimum °C (°F)	−21 (−6)	−17.5 (0.5)	−9.2 (15.4)	−1.5 (29.3)	5 (41)	9.6 (49.3)	12 (54)	10.4 (50.7)	4.6 (40.3)	−1.5 (29.3)	−9.8 (14.4)	−18.5 (−1.3)	−3.1 (26.4)
Record low °C (°F)	−47.8 (−54.0)	−45.6 (−50.1)	−42.8 (−45.0)	−26.1 (−15.0)	−11.1 (12.0)	−4.4 (24.1)	−0.6 (30.9)	−2.8 (27.0)	−14.4 (6.1)	−22.2 (−8.0)	−36.1 (−33.0)	−44.4 (−47.9)	−47.8 (−54.0)
Average precipitation mm (inches)	16.3 (0.64)	12.1 (0.48)	16.4 (0.65)	23.3 (0.92)	51.4 (2.02)	57 (2.2)	68.7 (2.70)	40.6 (1.60)	36 (1.4)	20.8 (0.82)	11.6 (0.46)	19.2 (0.76)	373.2 (14.69)
Source: Environment Canada

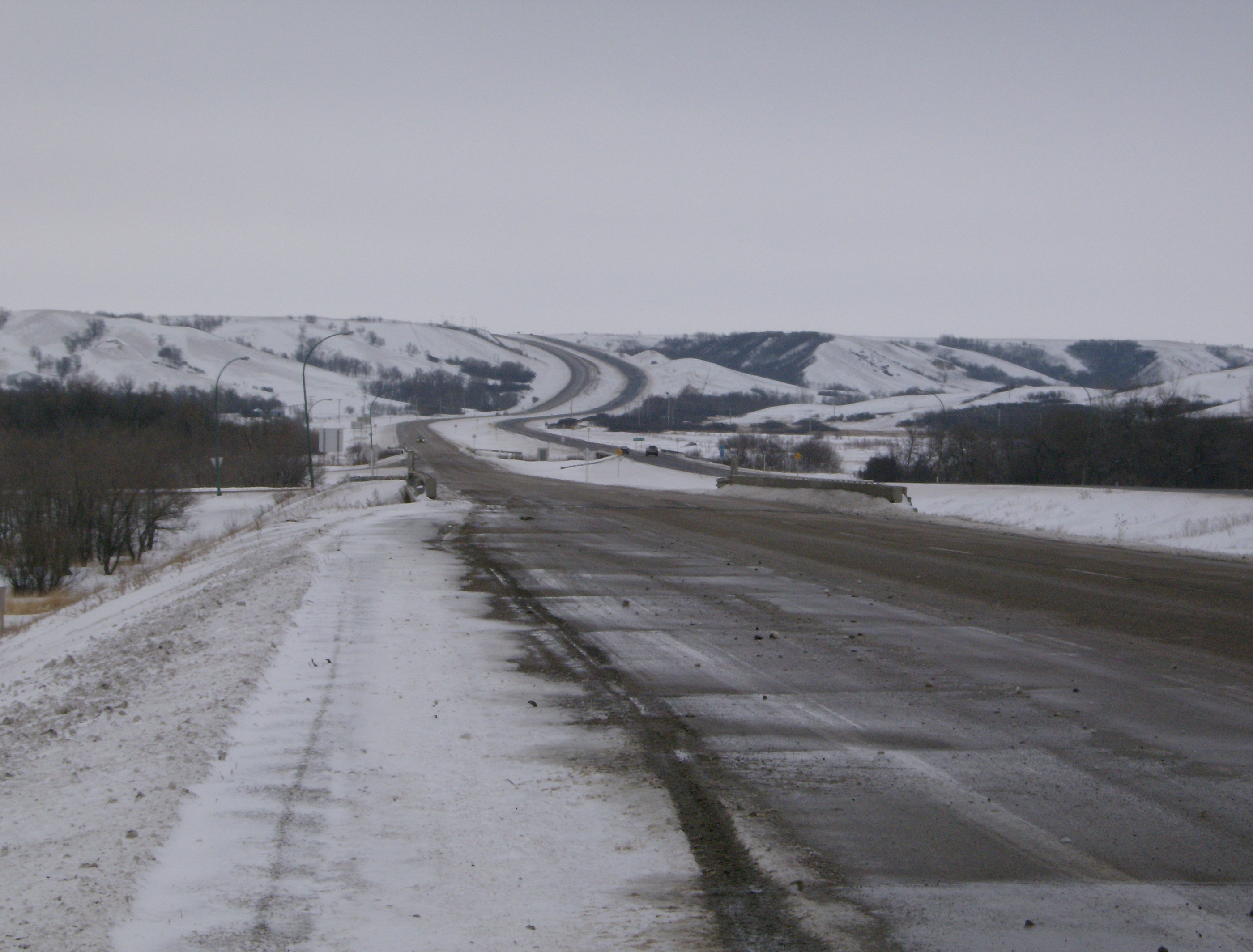
Qu'Appelle Valley from Highway 11

== Community events ==
=== Lumsden Duck Derby ===
Each year since 1987, the Duck Derby Committee hosts a fundraiser in which thousands of numbered plastic ducks are raced down the Qu'Appelle River. Participants purchase a numbered duck which is entered in the race, and the first ducks across the finish line win their owners cash and prizes. Proceeds from the derby benefit the Lumsden Sports Center (rink) in town. The Duck Derby also hosts a variety of artists, musicians, traders, etc. who perform and sell their wares in town.

=== Lumsden Scarecrow Festival ===
Lumsden hosts an annual Scarecrow Festival in September. Events of the day include a large street market, hay rides, activities for kids, food vendors, garage sales, outdoor movie and fireworks. The event usually draws thousands of people to town.

== Sports history ==
In 2006, the Lumsden Arena became the site of the second edition of the Western Women's Hockey League championship, between the Calgary Oval X-Treme and the Minnesota Whitecaps. The town frequently hosts games for the Saskatchewan Prairie Ice, now of the Western Women's Hockey League.

The Lumsden Monarchs are a senior men's ice hockey team that was a founding member of the Highway Hockey League in central Saskatchewan in 1965.

== Notable people ==
- Illingworth Kerr — artist (1905–1989)
- Edith Fowke — Canadian folklorist (1913–1996); born in Lumsden
- Tanner Glass — hockey player with the NHL, graduated from Lumsden High School
- Joe Fafard — died in Lumsden in 2019
- John Cullen Nugent — artist (1921–2014)

== See also ==
- List of towns in Saskatchewan
