= Saskatchewan Highway 306 =

Provincial highway in Saskatchewan, Canada

Highway 306

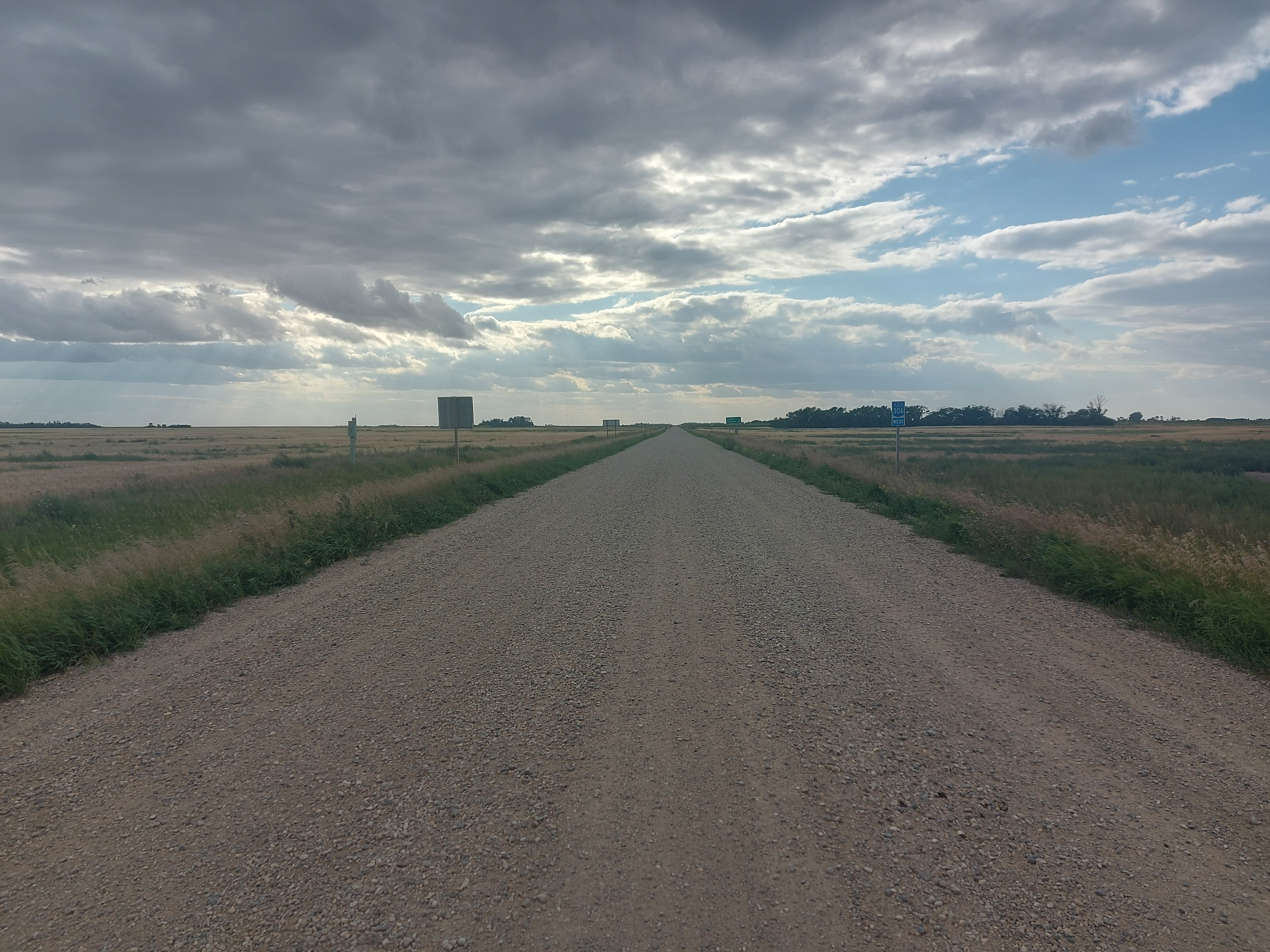
- Highway 306

Route information
- Maintained by Ministry of Highways and Infrastructure
- Length: 66.8 km (41.5 mi)

Major junctions
- West end: CanAm Highway / Highway 6 near Estlin
- East end: Highway 35 near Cedoux

Location
- Country: Canada
- Province: Saskatchewan
- Rural municipalities: Bratt's Lake, Lajord, Scott, Wellington

Highway system
- Provincial highways in Saskatchewan
← Highway 305	→ Highway 307

Highway 306 is a provincial highway in the Canadian province of Saskatchewan. It runs from Highway 6 to Highway 35.

The highway passes near the communities of Estlin, Gray, Riceton, Bechard, Lewvan, and Colfax and intersects Highway 621 near Lewvan. It is about 67 kilometres (42 mi) long.

== Route description ==
Hwy 306 begins several kilometres south of Regina at an intersection with Hwy 6 (CanAm Highway), within the Rural Municipality of Bratt's Lake No. 129. It heads due east into the hamlet of Estlin as a paved two-lane highway, where it crosses a former railway line and turns southeast for several kilometres to enter the Rural Municipality of Lajord No. 128. The highway immediately passes through the hamlet of Gray along First Avenue as it runs southeast parallel to the old rail line, passing through Riceton along First Avenue and having a junction with Hwy 622. After the pavement turns to gravel, Hwy 306 travels through Bechard to enter the Rural Municipality of Scott No. 98 and pass through the hamlet of Lewvan, where it has intersections with both Hwy 710 and Hwy 621. Now entering the Rural Municipality of Wellington No. 97, the highway immediately traverses a sudden switchback as it crosses over Colfax Creek shortly before travelling through the hamlet of Colfax along First Street, where it curves due eastward to cross the creek for a second time and turn away from the former railway line. Hwy 306 traverses rural farmland for a few kilometres before coming to an end at an intersection with Hwy 35 a few kilometres north of Cedoux.

== Major intersections ==
From west to east:

Rural municipality	Location	km	mi	Destinations	Notes
Bratt's Lake No. 129		0.0	0.0	Highway 6 / CanAm Highway – Weyburn, Regina	Western terminus; western end of paved section; road continues west as Township Road 152
Lajord No. 128	Riceton	29.2	18.1	Township Road 134	Eastern end of paved section
Lajord No. 128		29.9	18.6	Highway 622 north (Range Road 2175) – Kronau	Southern terminus of Hwy 622
Scott No. 98	Lewvan	47.8	29.7	Highway 710 west (Township Road 123) – Milestone	Eastern terminus of Hwy 710
Scott No. 98	Lewvan	48.4	30.1	Highway 621 (Range Road 2162) – Lajord, Yellow Grass	
Wellington No. 97		55.5	34.5	Bridge over Colfax Creek	
Wellington No. 97	Colfax	59.1	36.7	Bridge over Colfax Creek	
Wellington No. 97		66.8	41.5	Highway 35 – Francis, Cedoux, Weyburn	Eastern terminus
1.000 mi = 1.609 km; 1.000 km = 0.621 mi

== See also ==
- Transportation in Saskatchewan
- Roads in Saskatchewan
