= Co-op Refinery Complex =

Oil refinery in Regina, Saskatchewan, Canada

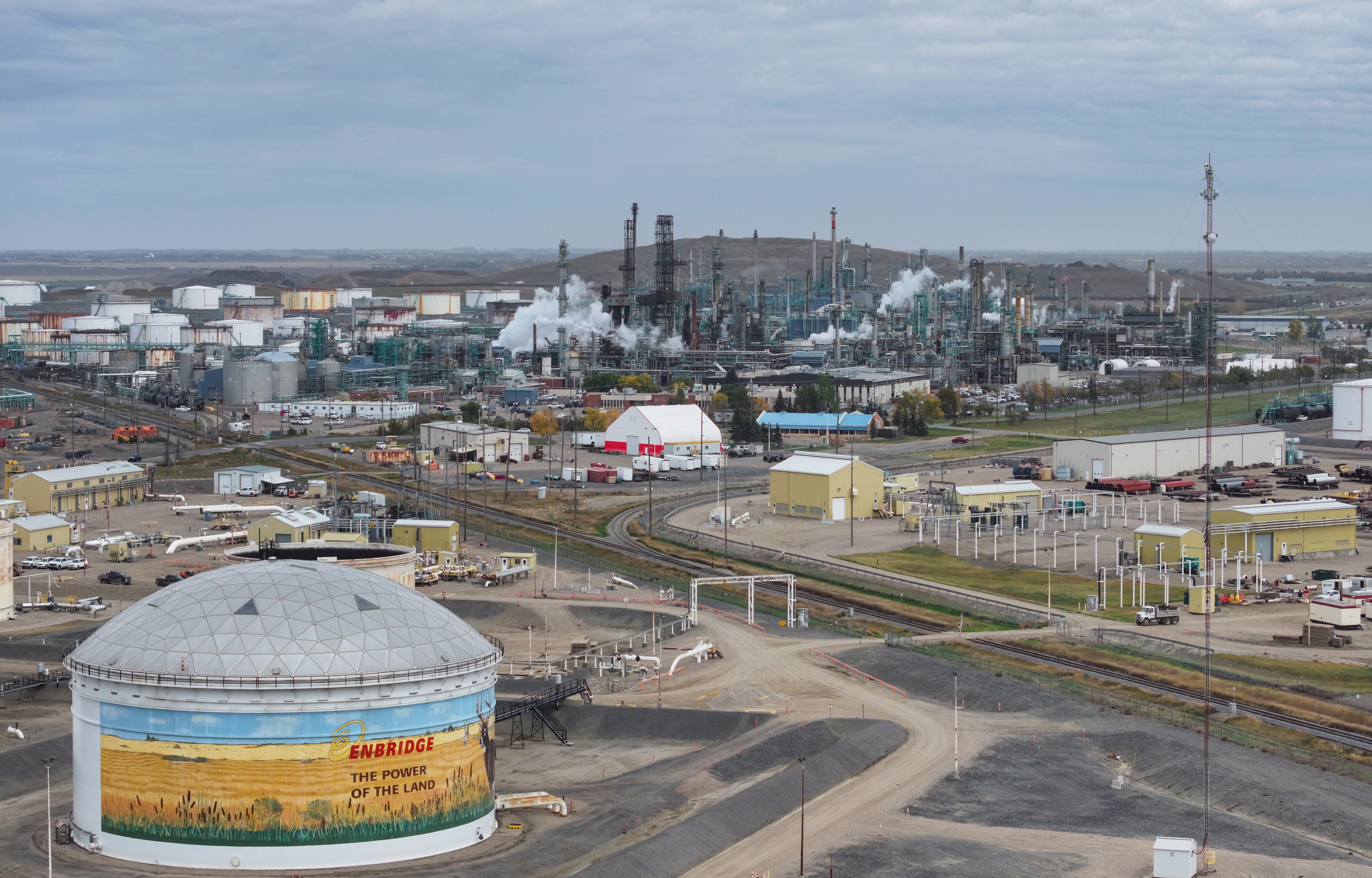
- Interactive map of Co-op Refinery Complex
- Location: Regina, Saskatchewan, Canada; 50.4854°N 104.5747°W

Refinery details
- Operator: Consumers Co-operative Refinery Limited
- Owner: Federated Co-operatives
- Opened: May 27, 1935
- Capacity: 145,000 barrels per day (23,100 m^{3}/d)
- No. of employees: 1100
- Refining units: 33
- Refining center: Regina

The Co-op Refinery Complex (CRC), is an oil refinery spread over 544 acres (2.20 km^{2}) located in the city of Regina, Saskatchewan, Canada. The CRC is owned and operated by Consumers Co-operative Refinery Limited, a wholly owned subsidiary of Federated Co-operatives Limited. The refinery provides oil products to the member co-operatives of Federated Co-operatives Limited as well as most other petroleum retailers in the region including major national and regional retail brands. Since opening in 1935 with a 500 barrels per day (79 m^{3}/d) capacity, the complex has been expanded numerous times over the decades, including an onsite heavy crude oil upgrader in 1988, and its most recent major expansion, in 2012, to 145,000 barrels per day (23,100 m^{3}/d) of refining capacity.

== History ==
=== Background of Distribution Network ===
In the 1930s, horses were giving way to petroleum-fuelled tractors. This was especially true in the area around Regina, where the broad level prairie was well suited to the first tractors and combine harvesters.

As petroleum use increased, farmers looked for the ways to reduce the cost of this important crop input. Many farmers had experience in the benefits of co-operation through joint purchases of inputs such as fence posts, binder twine and coal. These efforts often resulted in the formation of local co-ops. Based on this tradition, farmers formed oil co-ops to reduce the cost of fuel.

Co-ops were formed at Milestone, Wilcox, Sherwood at Regina, Moose Jaw, Riceton, Lewvan, Rouleau, Lang, Weyburn and Pense, among other locations. The co-ops often bought gasoline from US refiners and sold it at margins of up to seven cents a gallon, returning the savings to their members.

=== Tariffs and Elimination of Independent Refineries ===
In 1933, the Canadian government established a tariff of 3.7 cents a gallon on gasoline imported from the United States, effectively cutting the co-ops off from this source of supply. The co-ops turned to small, independent refiners at Coutts in Alberta and Moose Jaw in Saskatchewan. However, as the year progressed, these independent refiners were bought up by the major oil companies and the wholesale price of gasoline was raised two cents a gallon.

=== Response by Co-Ops ===
Beginning in the winter of 1933, the oil distribution co-ops launched a drive to build their own refinery. Among the leaders was Harry Fowler, the Manager of the Wilcox Co-op, who later became the refinery's first Secretary-Treasurer and Manager when the Refinery was incorporated in 1934.

The Refinery's first President was Ernest Frisk of Kronau, long-time Secretary of Riceton Co-op. Original Board Member, Sid Gough of Lewvan, distinguished himself by pledging the title to his own farm as security for the line of credit with the railroad. His faith allowed the refinery to continue operating at a critical point.

The fundraising drive raised a total of $32,000 from eight farmers. As this wasn't enough to build the cracking plant that was desired, the Board of Directors pressed ahead with a less-expensive "skimming plant" model capable of producing 500 barrels per day.

=== Launch and First Year ===
The refinery was brought into operation on May 27, 1935, at eleven o'clock in the morning.

In its first year of operation, the plant had sales of $253,000 and achieved savings of $30,000—almost equal to the initial investment.

=== Relationship with Federated Co-Operatives Limited ===
Relations between CRC and the Saskatchewan Co-operative Wholesale Society had been close from the beginning, with the wholesale purchasing fuel from the Refinery for resale to retail co-operatives across the province. The relationship became formal in 1944 when delegates for both organizations voted in favour of merging under the name Saskatchewan Federated Co-operatives Limited. Since then, CRC has operated as a wholly owned subsidiary of the Central Wholesale, which grew into Federated Co-operatives Limited, providing goods and services to retail co-operatives across Western Canada.

=== Early expansions ===
- In 1939, CRC signed a contract to build a cracking plant at a cost of approximately $250,000. The cracking plant was essential to increase the yield of gasoline. It also expanded production to 1,500 barrels of crude oil a day. Harry Fowler called it "our off the farm power plant."
- In 1951, CRC officially opened an expansion to 5,000 barrels a day.
- In 1954, A $1.7 million expansion doubled production to 12,000 barrels a day. As well, it made the Refinery added a then-state-of-the-art Cat Cracker and several other processing units.
- By 1974, when refinery capacity had already grown to 28,000 barrels of crude a day, a phased $30 million expansion program was announced to bring capacity up to 50,000 barrels a day.

== Upgrader ==
The energy crisis of the 1970s demonstrated the vulnerability of Canada to imported oil, as the price of crude oil escalated and domestic supplies of light sweet crude dwindled. Saskatchewan and Canada were determined to secure the nation's energy future by developing the vast reserves of conventional heavy crude oil in the Western Canada Sedimentary Basin. This included the deposits straddling the Alberta-Saskatchewan border surrounding Lloydminster. To do so, the country needed a heavy oil upgrader to change heavy crude into a product suitable for further processing by conventional refineries.

After intensive studies, it was agreed that an upgrader would be integrated with CRC's existing refining units. Integrating the upgrader with the Co-op Refinery reduced the cost of the Upgrader Project to about $700 million—or about half of what would have cost to build a stand-alone upgrader. CRC continued to own its refining units and also became a partner with the Saskatchewan government's Crown Investments Corporation in the ownership of NewGrade Energy Inc., whose sole asset would be the NewGrade Heavy Oil Upgrader (NewGrade Upgrader). The Canadian federal government supported the project through loan guarantees.

Construction officially began in October 1985. The mega project required hundreds of thousands of hours of engineering and approximately 6,000 tradespeople worked on the site for an estimated 4,500 person years of employment in construction.

The three-year construction phase was completed on time and on budget, and the Co-op Refinery/NewGrade Upgrader Complex went on stream in November 1988. The facility was the first upgrader built in Saskatchewan. On November 1, 2007, CCRL bought out the 50% interest held by Crown Investments Corporation for $383.1 million, with the NewGrade name eventually phased out and the upgrader simply being a unit of the CCRL Refinery Complex.

As of 2021, the CCRL upgrader processes 60,000 bbl/d (9,500 m^{3}/d) of naturally occurring heavy crude from Western Canada into a synthetic crude, a product that is lighter (measured in API gravity), and sweeter (lower sulphur content) than the heavy crude; the output is sent as feedstock to the onsite CCRL refinery, which was built to handle naturally occurring light sweet crude.

== Section V Expansion ==
In January 2008, Federated Co-operatives Limited (FCL) announced a major project, known at the Section V expansion, to increase the then-100,000 barrels per day (16,000 m^{3}/d) processing capacity of the refinery to a throughput of 130,000 barrels per day (21,000 m^{3}/d).

The Section V expansion involved building five new processing units (bringing the total to 33), 14 additional storage tanks, a new cooling tower and electrical substation as well as new firewater, flare, plant and instrument systems. The CA$2.66 billion (equivalent to $3.58 billion in 2025) expansion was brought online in October 2012; by the time of the expansion coming online, owner Federated Co-operatives Limited had shortened the name of the entire site from the Consumers' Co-operative Refineries Ltd. Complex to the Co-op Refinery Complex (CRC). The project allows the refinery to process 30 per cent more crude oil per day in the immediate term, with plans for continued capital investments that will see capacity increase by 45 per cent. The expansion also created roughly 100 new full-time jobs at the refinery.

Today the Co-op Refinery Complex produces 130,000 bbl/d and covers 800 acres of land in the north east corner of Regina, Saskatchewan.

== Unifor Labour Dispute ==
On December 5, 2019, approximately 800 workers at the refinery represented by Unifor Local 594 were locked out shortly after ratifying a vote for a 48-hour strike. This was preceded by negotiations for a new contract that stalled in October of that year, with one of the contentious issues being the conversion of the existing Defined Benefit Pension Plan (DBPP) to a Defined Contribution Pension Plan (DCPP), which would require workers to contribute financially to their pensions. The lockout lasted for over 6 months, when a new contract was signed on June 22, 2020.

== Explosions, Fires and Accidents ==
On October 6, 2011, an explosion occurred in the diesel processing area. This caused the site to be evacuated and sent seven people to hospital. The fire was expected to reduce the facility's diesel production by about 25 per cent, but did not affect its gasoline-processing operation. The refinery was undergoing a major expansion and renovation at the time, which resulted in much higher numbers of personnel on site at the time. All of the injured were employed by contractors. The explosion was found to be caused by a failure of corroded pipes. Consumers Co-operative Refinery Limited pleaded guilty to one of 5 Occupational Health and Safety charges and on May 12, 2015 was fined $280,000 for failing to ensure that work was "sufficiently and competently supervised". Fifty-two people had been injured the day of the explosion including 3 seriously.

There were two large-scale accidents reported in 2012, the first being an explosion on October 6, with an ensuing fire that hospitalized seven persons; the site was again in flames in the middle of May.

On February 11, 2013 the third major incident in 16 months occurred. A fire in the coker of the heavy oil upgrader section of the plant, shortly after midnight, resulted in no injuries.

On December 24, 2013 the fourth major incident in two years occurred. A fire and explosion, the cause of which is still undetermined, could be felt throughout the entire city. No injuries were reported and all refinery staff were accounted for.

Around Midnight on Tuesday March 1, 2016 a rail car containing asphalt rolled, uncontrolled, several kilometers into the city of Regina after it left CCRL property in a runaway condition. Neither the City of Regina or Regina Fire and Protective Services were notified by CCRL and were unaware of the event until the following Friday, the same day on which media reports of the event emerged.
