= Saskatchewan Highway 39 =

Provincial highway in Saskatchewan, Canada

Highway 39
- CanAm Highway (segment)
- Highway 39 highlighted in red and Highway 39A highlighted in blue
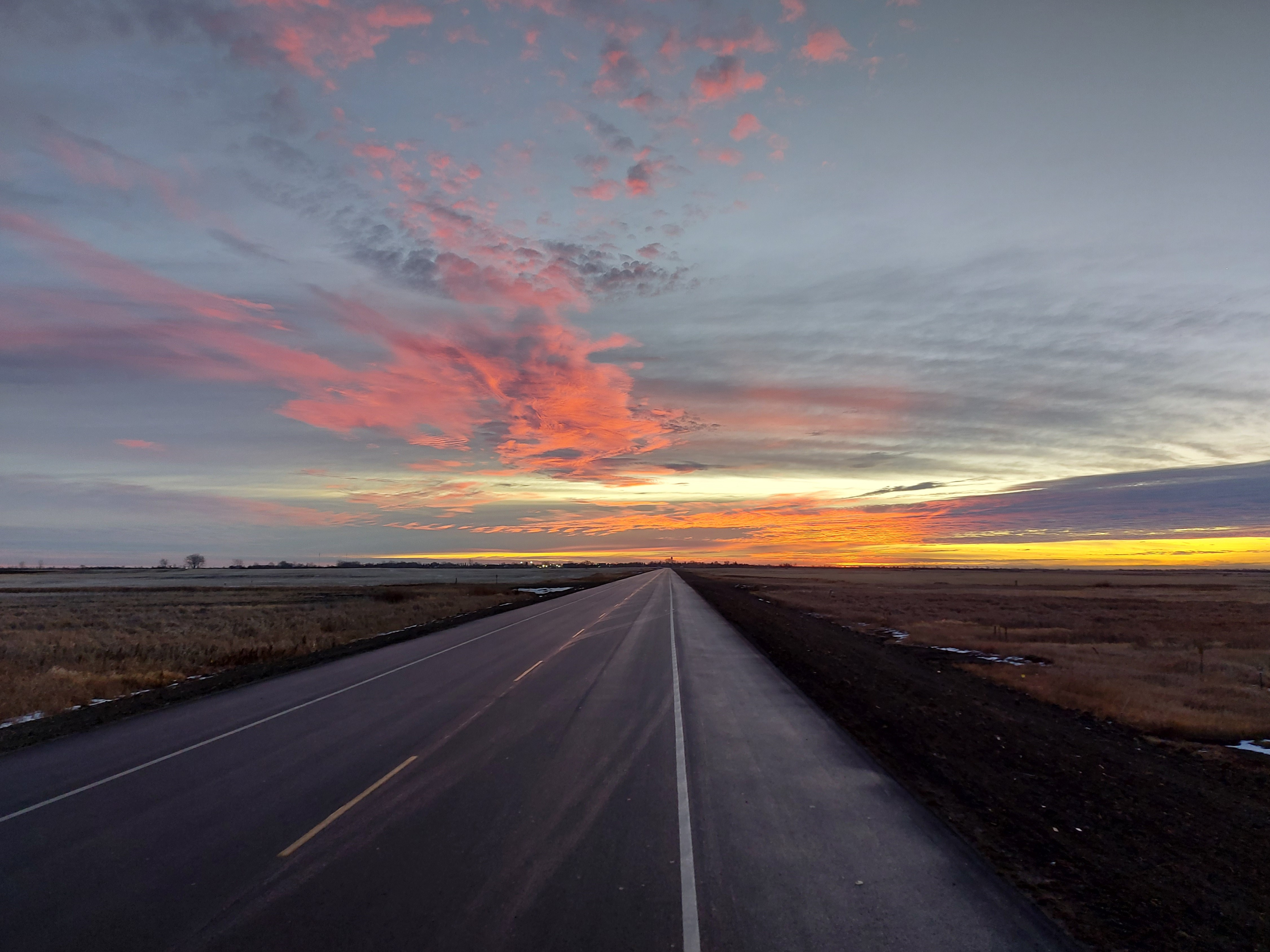
- A sunrise on Highway 39 near North Portal

Route information
- Maintained by Ministry of Highways and Infrastructure & Transport Canada
- Length: 263.5 km (163.7 mi)

Major junctions
- South end: US 52 at the U.S. border at North Portal
- Highway 18 at Estevan; Highway 47 at Estevan; Highway 35 / CanAm Highway at Weyburn; Highway 13 at Weyburn; Highway 6 / CanAm Highway at Corinne
- North end: Highway 1 (TCH) / Highway 301 near Moose Jaw

Location
- Country: Canada
- Province: Saskatchewan
- Rural municipalities: Coalfields No. 4, Estevan No. 5, Benson No. 35, Cymri No. 36, Weyburn No. 67, Scott No. 98, Caledonia No. 99, Bratt's Lake No. 129, Redburn No. 130, Pense No. 160, Moose Jaw No. 161
- Major cities: Estevan, Weyburn

Highway system
- Provincial highways in Saskatchewan
← Highway 38	→ Highway 40

Highway 39 is a provincial highway in the southern portion of the Canadian province of Saskatchewan. It runs from North Portal at the Canada–United States border north-west to Moose Jaw at Highway 1. This is a primary Saskatchewan highway maintained by the provincial and federal governments that provides a major trucking and tourism route between U.S. Route 52 and the Trans-Canada Highway.

Highway 39 is one of Canada's busiest highways, facilitating transport for $6 billion in trade goods via approximately 100,000 trucks over the year. About 71.3 kilometres (44.3 mi) of the highway between Weyburn and Corinne is part of the CanAm Highway route. Other Saskatchewan highways on the CanAm route include 35, 6, 3, and 2. Highway 39 is divided, or twinned, in two areas—east of Estevan for 10 kilometres (6.2 mi) to the junction with Highway 18 and north-west of Weyburn for 1.7 kilometres (1.1 mi). The junction of Highway 39 with the Trans–Canada divided four-lane highway is done via a partial cloverleaf interchange.

Over the last number of years, multiple projects have been completed to improve traffic flow and to make the highway safer. Highway 39 has been dubbed "Heaven's Flowered Highway" due to the number of deaths on the highway and the flowers and crosses lining it to honour the victims. Groups have been calling for the corridor of Highways 39 and 6 from the U.S. border to Regina to be twinned to improve safety, trade, and traffic flow.

== Route description ==
Highway 39 begins at the Portal–North Portal Border Crossing, which has Saskatchewan's only duty-free shop. From there, the highway heads north-west towards the Souris River valley. On the south side of the valley, and adjacent to the highway, is the Short Creek Cairn. The cairn commemorates a North-West Mounted Police camp from the 1874 Great March West. The actual camp was located nearby at the mouth of Short Creek on the Souris River near Roche Percee. From the cairn, Highway 39 descends into the valley, which is where the village of Roche Percee and Roche Percee Recreation Site are situated. Roche Percee is named after a geophysical rock formation in the area. Just east of Roche Percee are two arches created by limestone rocks upon which historic animals, and initials are carved. The local Indigenous people found this site to be a power centre. As the highway crosses the river and climbs up and out of the Souris River valley, it passes by two large dragline surface coal mines. With an abundance of coal, the first operational mine opened in 1891. The coal was shipped downstream by barge to Winnipeg until the CPR's Soo Line came through in 1893. Underground mines began being replaced in the 1930s and, by the 1950s, all underground mining had been replaced by dragline surface mines.

From the coal mines, Highway 39 opens up into a divided highway, is joined by, and has a 10-kilometre (6.2 mi) concurrency with, Highway 18, and heads west towards the city of Estevan. At the eastern outskirts of Estevan, Highway 39 diverges north and bypasses the city while Highway 39A continues through it. The 13-kilometre (8.1 mi) Estevan Bypass opened in November 2015.

Estevan is the eighth largest city in Saskatchewan and is known as "The Energy City" as there is an abundance of coal, oil, and natural gas resources near the city. Also nearby is Rafferty Dam, Boundary Dam Power Station, and Shand Power Station. Boundary Dam Power Station is the location of the Boundary Dam Carbon Capture Project. In June 2024, Saskatchewan's premier Scott Moe announced that small modular reactors were coming to Saskatchewan and "that the government was officially looking at just the Estevan area for the first reactor in Saskatchewan."

As the Highway 39 / Estevan Bypass skirts around the northern limits of Estevan, it is intersected by Highway 47. Highway 47 heads north to Stoughton and south through Estevan (intersecting with Highway 39A) to the Noonan–Estevan Border Crossing. Highway 39 is rejoined by Highway 39A north-west of Estevan where continues in a north-westerly direction past a weigh station and heads towards the city of Weyburn. Along the way, the highway provides access to many small communities, such as Hitchcock, Macoun, Midale, Halbrite, and Ralph. This section of highway parallels the Souris River and its reservoirs from Estevan to Weyburn and provides access to two regional parks: Mainprize Regional Park and Nickle Lake Regional Park.

Weyburn, "The Opportunity City", has also been dubbed the Soo Line City due its connection with Chicago on the Soo Line of the Canadian Pacific Railway (CPR). Weyburn is at the crossroads of three major highways—35, 39, and 13 and is near the upper delta of the 760-kilometre (470 mi) long Souris River. The Souris River continues south-east through North Dakota eventually meeting the Assiniboine River in Manitoba. In the 19th century, this area was known as an extension of the Greater Yellow Grass Marsh. "Extensive flood control programs have created reservoirs, parks and waterfowl centres along the Souris River." Notable points of interest in Weyburn accessible from Highway 39 include the Soo Line Historical Museum, Tommy Douglas statue, Weyburn Heritage Village, Water Tower, River Park Campground, and the site of the former Weyburn Mental Hospital. In the spring of 2025, the construction of a roundabout was begun at the intersection of 39 and 13. Completed in the fall of 2025, it cost $29 million and included a further 5.8 kilometres (3.6 mi) of twinning along Highway 39. The twinning was completed a full year ahead of schedule.

From Weyburn, Highway 39 begins the CanAm section as it continues in a north-westerly direction towards Corinne and Highway 6, at which point it has a 3.7-kilometre (2.3 mi) concurrency with 6. Communities along the stretch of highway from Weyburn to Corinne include McTaggart, Yellow Grass, Lang, and Milestone. At Corinne, the CanAm Highway diverges from Highway 39 and follows Highway 6 to Regina. A two-year, $57 million twinning project from the concurrency of Highways 6 and 39 to Regina was completed in 2025. The project is split into two sections—the twinning of a 7.1-kilometre (4.4 mi) segment beginning at the Highway 39 and Highway 6 concurrency south-east of Corinne to a point north of Corinne on Highway 6 and a 7.8-kilometre (4.8 mi) twinning of Highway 6 from Highway 306 north to the Regina Bypass.

After Corinne, Highway 39 continues north-west for the final leg of its route to the Trans-Canada Highway. This section provides access to the communities of Wilcox, Rouleau, Drinkwater, and Pasqua. Rouleau was the host town for the popular Canadian sitcom, Corner Gas, which aired from 2004 to 2009. The show was set in the fictional town of Dog River, Saskatchewan. West of the northern terminus along the Trans-Canada Highway is the city of Moose Jaw.

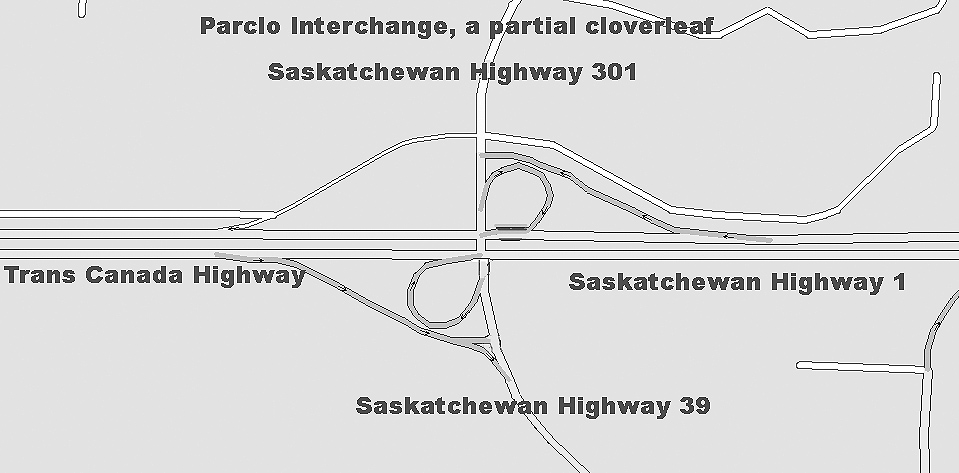
Partial cloverleaf interchange at the Trans-Canada Highway (east–west), Highway 39 (south), and Highway 301 (north)

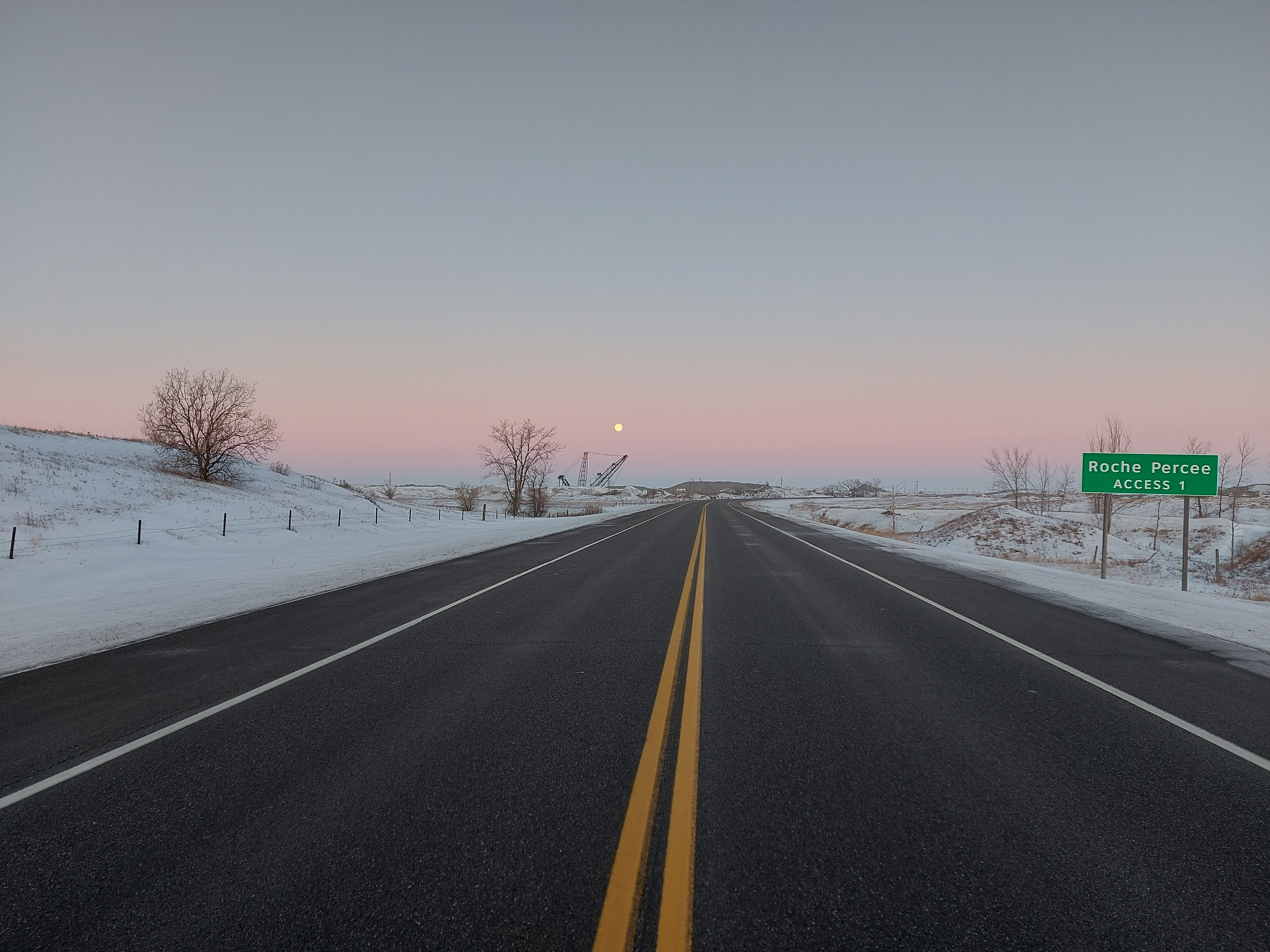
Highway 39 at Roche Percee with mine tailings on either side

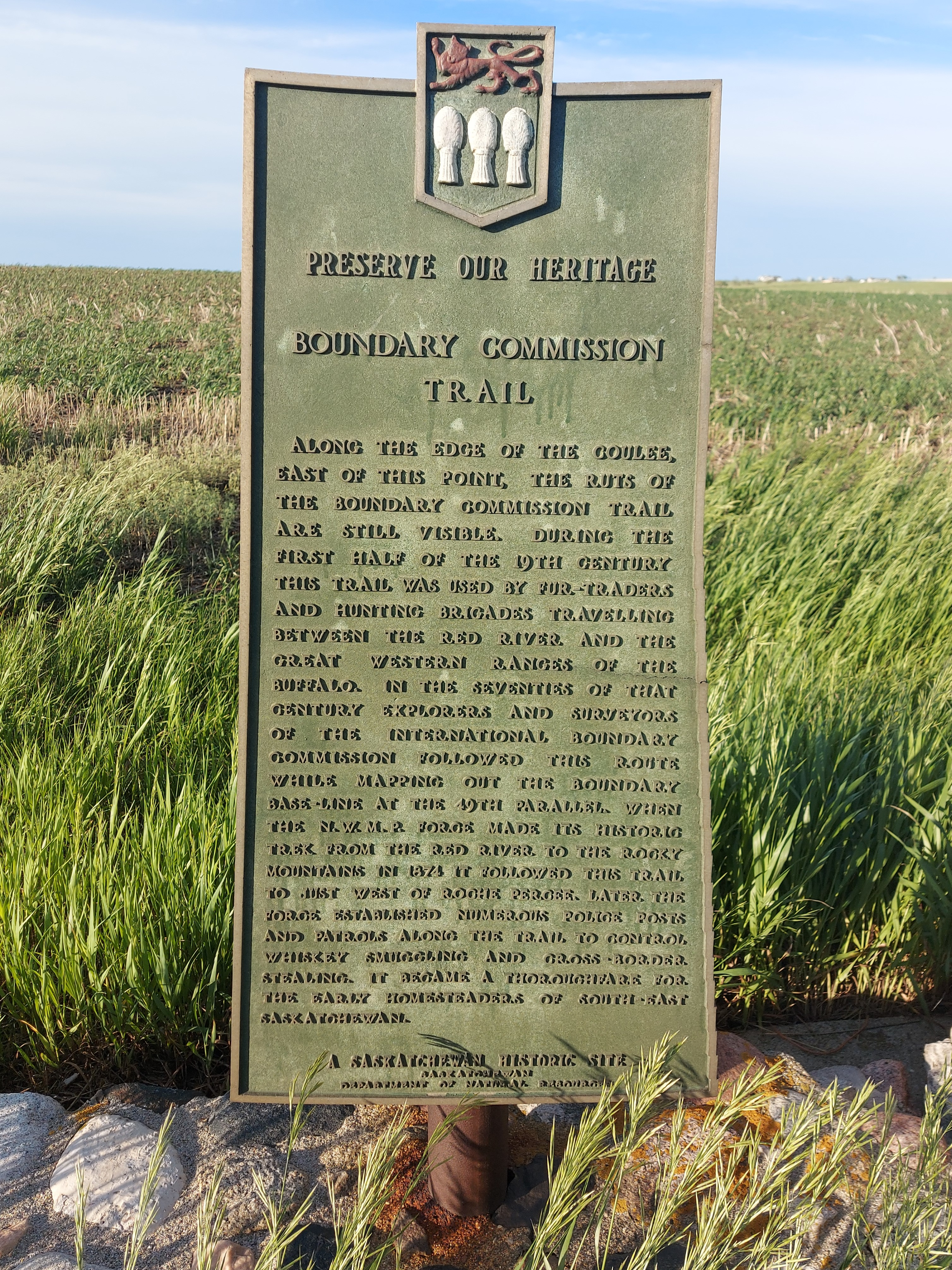
Short Creek Cairn

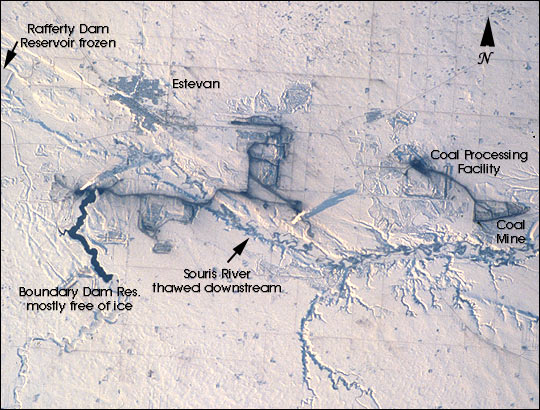
Estevan, and the Estevan Coalfield, along the Souris River, viewed from the Space Shuttle, February 2001

=== CanAm Highway ===
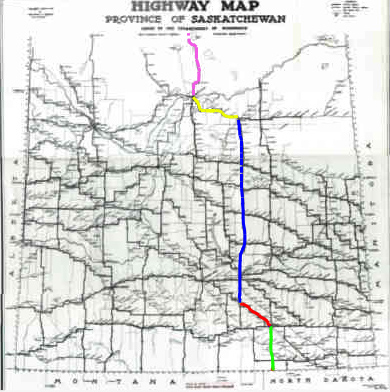
CanAm Highway Legend through Saskatchewan: Sk 35 – green Sk 39 – red Sk 6 – blue Sk 3 – yellow Sk 2 – pink

The 71.7-kilometre (44.6 mi) segment between Weyburn and Corinne is designated as a portion of the CanAm Highway. Near Corinne, Highway 39 is concurrent with Highway 6, at Corinne, the CanAm Highway continues north on Highway 6. South of Weyburn, the CanAm Highway crosses the Canada–United States border via Highway 35. "The projects on Highways 39 and 6 will help to improve traffic flow through these Canada/U.S. ports. 'Highways 6 and 39 are very important to Saskatchewan—serving as tourism links and major north–south trade corridors to the U.S.,' former NDP Highways and Transportation Minister Maynard Sonntag had said in 2004."

== History ==
Saskatchewan's Highway 39 traverses a course on a diagonal from the south–east at the U.S. border to north–west at the Trans-Canada Highway east of Moose Jaw. Originally, the road followed the early surveyed road allowances and the grade of the CPR or Soo Line between the United States border and east of Moose Jaw. Travel along Highway 39 before the 1940s would have been travelling on the square following the township road allowances, barbed wire fencing, and rail lines. As the surveyed township roads were the easiest to travel, the first highway was designed on 90 degree right angle corners as the distance traversed the prairie along range roads and township roads.

By 1940, Highway 39 has been straightened out for most of its route and no longer follows the road allowances "on the square". As late as 1955 though, there were still right angle segment of the highway near Corinne as well as south of Estevan to North Portal. At this point, the highway still ran through Roche Percee while now it bypasses the village to the east.

In 1947 and 1948, the highway was paved from North Portal to its junction with Highway 6 at Corinne. However, the paved surface fell into disrepair within a few years; a Leader-Post reporter wrote in 1953 that "practically the entire road, from North Portal through to Corinne is just a mass of large gaping potholes, ruts, and cracks, and in some places the hard surface is gone completely." Saskatchewan Motor Transport association director A.R. Mang blamed the poor condition of the road on a failure to place a suitable "base course", a layer of gravel and clay, between the pavement and the road's earthen base. A 1955 map shows that a segment between Estevan and Lang had reverted to gravel and a 1956 highway map shows the entire segment between Weyburn and Estevan as a gravel highway. These maps also show the segment between Corinne and the junction with the Trans-Canada Highway as gravel. Repairs were carried out at considerable expense, but the situation required temporary bans on heavy traffic and the rerouting of traffic along nearby roads.

In 2008, a trade group called the Soo Line Corridor Association advocated twinning much of Highway 39 and part of Highway 6 to create a continuous twinned corridor stretching from Regina to North Portal to boost Saskatchewan's trade with the United States. Former premier Lorne Calvert had expressed interest in the proposal. In response to a fatality in 2009, another group—Time to Twin Committee—was formed to advocate for the twinning. In the decade preceding 2016, an average of three people a year had died on Highway 39. One such fatality in 2012 in a highway construction zone near Midale—that of a pregnant flagger on her first day on the job—swiftly brought legislative changes for drivers in construction zones.

First announced in 2008, the first phase of twinning was completed in 2017 east of Estevan. The second was started in 2023 near Corinne.

Over the years, Highway 39 has undergone several resurfacing and improvement projects. Some of those projects include:

- In 2001, 14.4 km (8.9 mi) was resurfaced near Milestone
- In 2003, a further 11 km (6.8 mi) was resurfaced near Milestone
- In 2004, 18.2 km (11.3 mi) north of U.S. border was resurfaced
- In 2004, 7.8 km (4.8 mi) near Yellow Grass was resurfaced
- In 2015, the Highway 39 bypass around Estevan was completed
- In 2017, the first major section of twinning was completed east of Estevan
- In 2020, there were multiple projects that improved over 200 km (120 mi) of Highway 39 between North Portal and Rouleau. This project saw 11 new passing lanes, resurfacing, culverts, and various safety upgrades. Highlights of the project include:
  - Five sets of passing lanes, 35 km (22 mi) of resurfacing, culvert replacements, and the addition of an intelligent transportation system between Hitchcock and Weyburn
  - Four sets of passing lanes and 25 km (16 mi) of resurfacing from McTaggart to Milestone
  - 32 km (20 mi) of improvements from Corinne to Rouleau

== Major intersections ==
From south to north:

Rural municipality	Location	km	mi	Destinations	Notes
Coalfields No. 4	North Portal	0.0	0.0	US 52 east – Minot	Continuation into North Dakota
Coalfields No. 4	North Portal	0.0	0.0	Canada–United States border at Portal–North Portal Border Crossing	
Coalfields No. 4	North Portal	1.1	0.68	Highway 604 north (First Street) – North Portal	
Coalfields No. 4		10.9	6.8	Highway 703 west	
Coalfields No. 4		20.2	12.6	Crosses Souris River	
Estevan No. 5		23.8	14.8	Roche Percee Access Road	
Estevan No. 5		27.0	16.8	Highway 18 east – Bienfait, Oxbow	South end of Highway 18 concurrency
Estevan No. 5	Estevan	33.2	20.6	Highway 18 west / Highway 39A north – City Centre, Torquay	Highway 39 follows Estevan Bypass; north end of Highway 18 concurrency
Estevan No. 5	Estevan	41.1	25.5	Highway 47 (Souris Avenue) – City Centre, U.S. border, Stoughton	
Estevan No. 5	Estevan	46.2	28.7	Highway 39A south – City Centre	West end of Estevan Bypass
Benson No. 35	No major junctions				
Cymri No. 36	Midale	80.1	49.8	Highway 702 east	
Cymri No. 36	Midale	80.8	50.2	Highway 606 – Torquay, Fillmore	
Cymri No. 36	Halbrite	95.0	59.0	Highway 705	
City of Weyburn		122.0	75.8	16th Street	
City of Weyburn		123.5	76.7	Crosses Souris River	
City of Weyburn		124.0	77.1	Highway 35 / CanAm Highway (Government Road) – Tribune, U.S. border, Francis	CanAm Highway south end (continues along Highway 35 south)
City of Weyburn		126.5	78.6	Highway 13 (Red Coat Trail) – Assiniboia, Carlyle	
Weyburn No. 67	McTaggart	137.7	85.6		
Scott No. 98	Yellow Grass	150.7	93.6	Highway 621 north – Lewvan	South end of Highway 621 concurrency
Scott No. 98		152.7	94.9	Highway 621 south	North end of Highway 621 concurrency
Scott No. 98	Lang	170.7	106.1		
Caledonia No. 99	Milestone	184.1	114.4	Highway 710	
Caledonia No. 99		191.5	119.0	Highway 6 south – Regway, U.S. border	South end of Highway 6 concurrency
Bratt's Lake No. 129	Corinne	194.4	120.8	Highway 334 west – Avonlea	
Bratt's Lake No. 129		195.2	121.3	Highway 6 north / CanAm Highway – Regina	CanAm Highway north end; north end of Highway 6 concurrency
Redburn No. 130	Wilcox	204.0	126.8		
Redburn No. 130	Rouleau	221.4	137.6	Highway 714 east	Home of Corner Gas at Dog River
Redburn No. 130		225.8	140.3	Highway 623 south – Truax	South end of Highway 623 concurrency
Redburn No. 130		227.6	141.4	Highway 623 north – Pense	North end of Highway 623 concurrency
Redburn No. 130	Drinkwater	240.8	149.6		
Pense No. 160		250.6	155.7	Highway 339 south – Briercrest Highway 642 north – Belle Plaine	
Moose Jaw No. 161		263.5	163.7	Highway 1 (TCH) – Moose Jaw, Swift Current, Regina Highway 301 north – Buffalo Pound Provincial Park	Interchange; Highway 1 exit 308; through traffic follows Highway 301
1.000 mi = 1.609 km; 1.000 km = 0.621 mi: Concurrency terminus; Route transition

== Highway 39A ==
Highway 39A
- Location: Estevan
- Length: 11 km (6.8 mi)

Highway 39A is a highway in Saskatchewan serving the city of Estevan. It runs from the Highway 18 / Highway 39 concurrency east of Estevan to Highway 39, north-west of the city. It is the original configuration for Highway 39 through Estevan and was designated after the Estevan Bypass was opened in November 2015.

The highway runs concurrently with Highway 18 from it southern terminus east of Estevan along 4th Street, to Souris Avenue where Highway 18 turns south and leaves the concurrency, becoming concurrent with Highway 47. It continues to 13th Avenue where Highway 47 turns north and Highway 39A continues north-west, leaving Estevan to its northern terminus with Highway 39. Highway 39A is about 11 kilometres (7 mi) long.

=== Major intersections ===
Rural municipality	Location	km	mi	Destinations	Notes
Estevan No. 5		0.0	0.0	Highway 18 east / Highway 39 south – Bienfait, North Portal, U.S. border	Southern terminus; south end of Highway 18 concurrency
City of Estevan		5.1	3.2	Highway 18 west / Highway 47 south (Souris Avenue) – Torquay, U.S. border	North end of Highway 18 concurrency; south end of Highway 47 concurrency
City of Estevan		5.6	3.5	Highway 47 north (13th Avenue) – Stoughton	North end of Highway 47 concurrency
Estevan No. 5		11.2	7.0	Highway 39 north – Weyburn, Regina	Northern terminus
1.000 mi = 1.609 km; 1.000 km = 0.621 mi: Concurrency terminus

== See also ==
- Transportation in Saskatchewan
- Roads in Saskatchewan

Preceded by Highway 35	CanAm Highway; Hwy 39	Succeeded by Highway 6
