= Diana, Saskatchewan =

Human settlement in Saskatchewan, Canada

Coordinates: 50.138°N 104.804°W

Diana is an unincorporated community in Bratt's Lake Rural Municipality No. 129, Saskatchewan, Canada. The community was located between the town of Rouleau and Wilcox on Highway 39 about 25 km north of the town of Milestone. There currently is a population of 0 residents living in Diana as of 2011, thus making it a ghost town.

The community was officially named on August 7, 1954, in honour of the Roman goddess of the hunt and her temple at Ephesus, Turkey.

== See also ==
- List of communities in Saskatchewan
- List of ghost towns in Saskatchewan
