= Portal, North Dakota =

Portal
- City
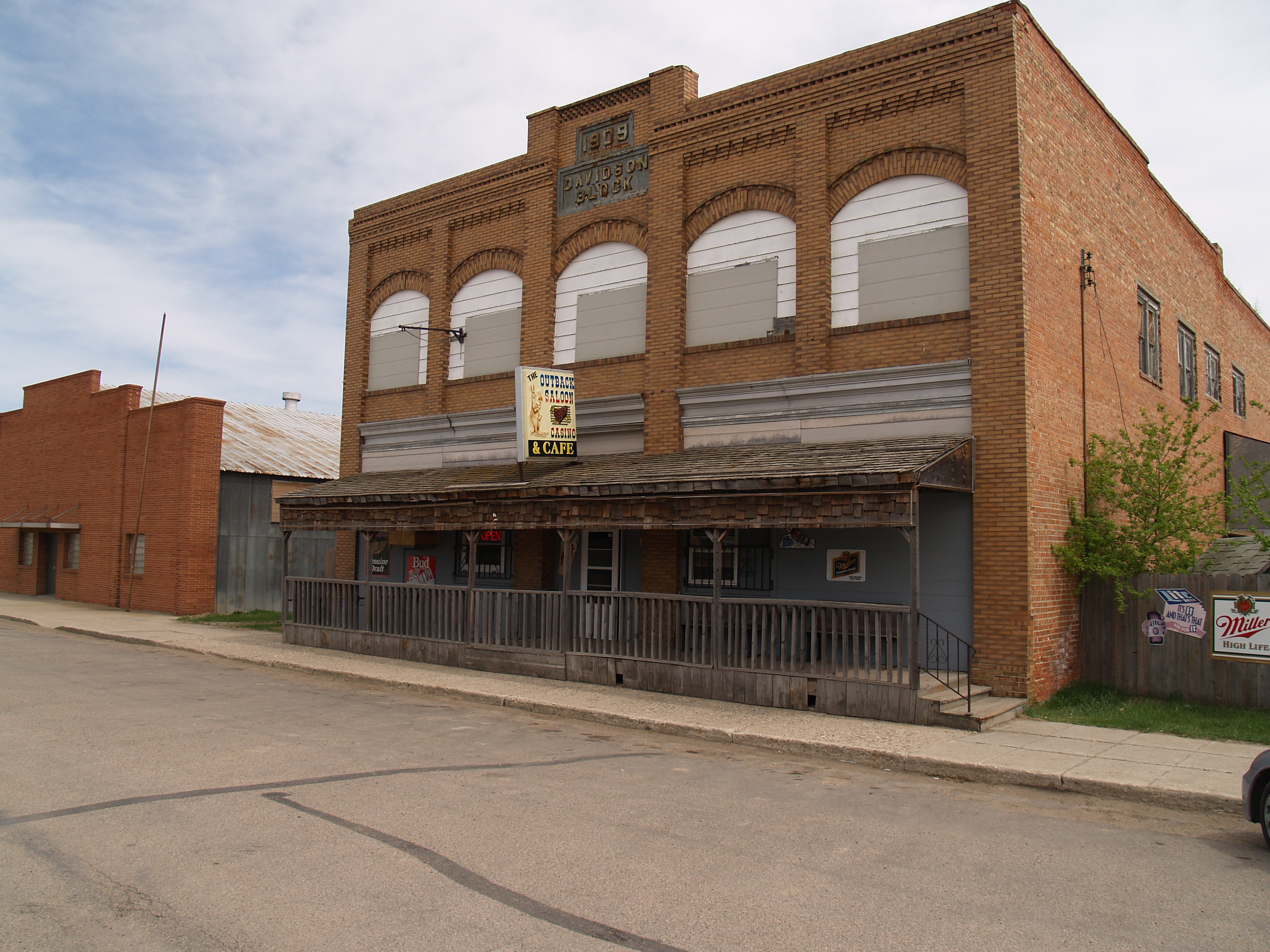
- Building in Portal

- Location of Portal, North Dakota
- Coordinates: 48°59′41″N 102°32′52″W
- Country: United States
- State: North Dakota
- County: Burke
- Founded: 1893

Area
  - Total: 0.68 sq mi (1.75 km^{2})
  - Land: 0.67 sq mi (1.73 km^{2})
  - Water: 0.0077 sq mi (0.02 km^{2})
- Elevation: 1,955 ft (596 m)

Population (2020)
  - Total: 125
  - Estimate (2022): 120
  - Density: 187.1/sq mi (72.24/km^{2})
- Time zone: UTC-6 (Central (CST))
  - Summer (DST): UTC-5 (CDT)
- ZIP code: 58772
- Area code: 701
- FIPS code: 38-63740
- GNIS feature ID: 1036226
- Website: www.portalnorthdakota.org

Portal is a city in Burke County, North Dakota, United States. The population was 125 at the 2020 census. Portal was founded in 1893.

Portal sits along the Canadian border and is a major port of entry border crossing for road (connecting US Route 52 and Saskatchewan Highway 39) and rail traffic. North Portal, Saskatchewan is just over the border north of Portal and adjacent to it. It is one of three year-round, 24-hour ports in North Dakota (the others being Dunseith and Pembina).

== Geography ==
According to the United States Census Bureau, the city has a total area of 0.56 square miles (1.45 km^{2}), all land.

== Economy ==
Because Portal is in the Bakken Oil Field region, the cost of living has risen considerably in recent years. A 2015 speech by a U.S. Customs and Border Protection official used Portal as an example of an area where the cost of living, combined with limited housing availability, and the distance from medical care and shopping, can make it difficult to attract employees for federal government positions.

The Portal State Bank, built in 1903, is on the National Register of Historic Places. The William E. Metzger House, built in 1904 - 1905, is also on the National Register of Historic Places.

A notable tourist attraction is the Gateway Cities Golf Club. It is one of only two golf courses along the border, the other being the Aroostook Valley Country Club in Maine. Eight of the course's nine holes are located within Canada, but the course's ninth hole, and the clubhouse, are located in the United States.

== Demographics ==
Historical population
| Census | Pop. | Note | %± |
|---|---|---|---|
| 1910 | 491 | | — |
| 1920 | 454 | | −7.5% |
| 1930 | 512 | | 12.8% |
| 1940 | 499 | | −2.5% |
| 1950 | 409 | | −18.0% |
| 1960 | 351 | | −14.2% |
| 1970 | 251 | | −28.5% |
| 1980 | 238 | | −5.2% |
| 1990 | 192 | | −19.3% |
| 2000 | 131 | | −31.8% |
| 2010 | 126 | | −3.8% |
| 2020 | 125 | | −0.8% |
| 2022 (est.) | 120 | | −4.0% |
U.S. Decennial Census; 2020 Census

=== 2010 census ===
As of the census of 2010, there were 126 people, 61 households, and 38 families residing in the city. The population density was 225.0 inhabitants per square mile (86.9/km^{2}). There were 80 housing units at an average density of 142.9 per square mile (55.2/km^{2}). The racial makeup of the city was 96.0% White, 0.8% African American, 2.4% Native American, and 0.8% from two or more races. Hispanic or Latino of any race were 4.0% of the population.

There were 61 households, of which 23.0% had children under the age of 18 living with them, 49.2% were married couples living together, 9.8% had a female householder with no husband present, 3.3% had a male householder with no wife present, and 37.7% were non-families. 31.1% of all households were made up of individuals, and 8.2% had someone living alone who was 65 years of age or older. The average household size was 2.07 and the average family size was 2.58.

The median age in the city was 46.6 years. 19% of residents were under the age of 18; 8.7% were between the ages of 18 and 24; 18.3% were from 25 to 44; 40.4% were from 45 to 64; and 13.5% were 65 years of age or older. The gender makeup of the city was 54.8% male and 45.2% female.

=== 2000 census ===
As of the census of 2000, there were 131 people, 63 households, and 43 families residing in the city. The population density was 232.8 inhabitants per square mile (89.9/km^{2}). There were 98 housing units at an average density of 174.1 per square mile (67.2/km^{2}). The racial makeup of the city was 99.24% White and 0.76% Native American.

There were 63 households, out of which 19.0% had children under the age of 18 living with them, 63.5% were married couples living together, 3.2% had a female householder with no husband present, and 31.7% were non-families. 31.7% of all households were made up of individuals, and 14.3% had someone living alone who was 65 years of age or older. The average household size was 2.08 and the average family size was 2.58.

In the city the population was spread out, with 17.6% under the age of 18, 1.5% from 18 to 24, 24.4% from 25 to 44, 38.9% from 45 to 64, and 17.6% who were 65 years of age or older. The median age was 48 years. For every 100 females, there were 101.5 males. For every 100 females age 18 and over, there were 92.9 males.

The median income for a household in the city was $36,406, and the median income for a family was $48,929. Males had a median income of $37,000 versus $20,500 for females. The per capita income for the city was $18,949. There were 7.1% of families and 10.0% of the population living below the poverty line, including no one under the age of 18 and 10.3% of those over 64.
