= H75 =

H75 may refer to:

- Curtiss H-75, a variant of the Curtiss P-36 Hawk fighter aircraft
- GE H75, the 750 shp or 550 shp variant in the General Electric H-Series of turboprop aircraft engines
- HMS Decoy (H75), D-class destroyer of the Royal Navy

== See also ==
- Piapot 75H, a Canadian Indian reserve of the Piapot Cree Nation in Saskatchewan
