= Piapot 75H =

Indian reserve in Saskatchewan, Canada

Coordinates: 49°54′09″N 104°49′44″W

- Indian reserve
- Piapot Indian Reserve No. 75H
- Flag

- Location in Saskatchewan
- First Nation: Piapot
- Country: Canada
- Province: Saskatchewan

Area
  - Total: 894.6 ha (2,211 acres)

Population (2016)
  - Total: 0
  - Density: 0.0/km^{2} (0.0/sq mi)

Piapot 75H is an Indian reserve of the Piapot Cree Nation in Saskatchewan. It is fourteen quarter sections located in Townships 9, 10, and 12 in Ranges 21 and 22 west of the Second Meridian, in the vicinity of Dummer, Saskatchewan, surrounded by the Rural Municipality of Caledonia No. 99. Highway 334 does pass through a portion of the reserve. In the 2016 Canadian Census, it recorded a population of 0 living in 0 of its 0 total private dwellings.

== See also ==
- List of Indian reserves in Saskatchewan
