= Gene Sobchuk =

Canadian ice hockey player

- Born: February 19, 1951 (age 74); Lang, Saskatchewan, Canada
- Height: 5 ft 9 in (175 cm)
- Weight: 170 lb (77 kg; 12 st 2 lb)
- Position: Left wing
- Shot: Left
- Played for: NHL; Vancouver Canucks; WHA; Phoenix Roadrunners; Cincinnati Stingers
- NHL draft: 109th overall, 1971; New York Rangers
- Playing career: 1971–1978

Eugene Sobchuk (born February 19, 1951) is a former Canadian professional ice hockey player. He played one game in the National Hockey League with the Vancouver Canucks on December 4, 1973. He played 81 games in the World Hockey Association with the Phoenix Roadrunners and Cincinnati Stingers. Throughout his career, which lasted from 1971 to 1978, Sobchuk also played in various minor leagues as well. Sobchuk is the brother of Dennis Sobchuk.

== Career statistics ==
=== Regular season and playoffs ===
			Regular season					Playoffs
Season	Team	League	GP	G	A	Pts	PIM	GP	G	A	Pts	PIM
1968–69	Weyburn Red Wings	SJHL	—	—	—	—	—	—	—	—	—	—
1969–70	Weyburn Red Wings	SJHL	45	22	36	58	28	—	—	—	—	—
1970–71	Regina Pats	WCHL	66	17	37	54	74	6	3	2	5	2
1971–72	Des Moines Oak Leafs	IHL	56	16	18	34	16	—	—	—	—	—
1972–73	Rochester Americans	AHL	58	22	16	38	29	6	1	4	5	4
1973–74	Vancouver Canucks	NHL	1	0	0	0	0	—	—	—	—	—
1973–74	Seattle Totems	WHL	55	15	19	34	30	—	—	—	—	—
1973–74	Virginia Wings	AHL	18	12	5	17	14	—	—	—	—	—
1974–75	Phoenix Roadrunners	WHA	3	1	0	1	0	—	—	—	—	—
1974–75	Tulsa Oilers	CHL	73	35	28	63	65	2	1	0	1	2
1975–76	Cincinnati Stingers	WHA	78	23	19	42	37	—	—	—	—	—
1976–77	Oklahoma City Blazers	CHL	29	4	11	15	6	—	—	—	—	—
1976–77	Springfield Indians	AHL	3	1	0	1	0	—	—	—	—	—
1977–78	Hampton Gulls	AHL	37	3	5	8	2	—	—	—	—	—
WHA totals			81	24	19	43	37	—	—	—	—	—
NHL totals			1	0	0	0	0	—	—	—	—	—

== See also ==
- List of players who played only one game in the NHL
