= Dummer, Saskatchewan =

Community in Saskatchewan, Canada

Coordinates: 49°50′40″N 104°50′12″W

Dummer is an unincorporated community in the Canadian province of Saskatchewan, located in the Rural Municipality of Caledonia No. 99. Dummer is located along Township Road 104, which connects it with Highway 623 6 kilometres (3.7 mi) to the west, and with Highway 6 17 kilometres (11 mi) to the east. The community lies just to the west of Avonlea Creek and is surrounded by the Piapot First Nation. Like many small towns in Saskatchewan, a railway line once passed through the community, but it has long been abandoned.

== See also ==
- List of communities in Saskatchewan
