= Dennis Sobchuk =

Canadian ice hockey player

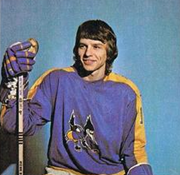
- Born: January 12, 1954 (age 72) Lang, Saskatchewan, Canada
- Height: 6 ft 2 in (188 cm)
- Weight: 180 lb (82 kg; 12 st 12 lb)
- Position: Centre
- Shot: Left
- Played for: Phoenix Roadrunners; Cincinnati Stingers; Edmonton Oilers; Detroit Red Wings; Innsbrucker EV; Quebec Nordiques
- NHL draft: 89th overall, 1974; Philadelphia Flyers
- Playing career: 1974–1984

Dennis James Sobchuk (born January 12, 1954) is a Canadian former professional ice hockey centre. He played 35 games in the National Hockey League (NHL) and played 348 games in the World Hockey Association (WHA), most notably for the Phoenix Roadrunners.

== Early life ==
Sobchuk was born in Lang, Saskatchewan. His older brother is Gene Sobchuk, also a professional hockey player. The two played together on the Cincinnati Stingers while their father, Harry Sobchuk, was the scout for the team.

== Career ==
During his career, Sobchuk was a member of the Detroit Red Wings and Quebec Nordiques. He also played five seasons in the World Hockey Association (WHA) with the Phoenix Roadrunners, Cincinnati Stingers and Edmonton Oilers.

His jersey number 14 is one of six numbers retired by the Regina Pats of the Western Hockey League (WHL).

== Career statistics ==
=== Regular season and playoffs ===
			Regular season					Playoffs
Season	Team	League	GP	G	A	Pts	PIM	GP	G	A	Pts	PIM
1970–71	Weyburn Red Wings	SJHL	—	—	—	—	—	—	—	—	—	—
1970–71	Estevan Bruins	WCHL	8	1	1	2	14	—	—	—	—	—
1971–72	Regina Pats	WCHL	68	56	67	123	115	15	9	18	27	50
1972–73	Regina Pats	WCHL	66	67	80	147	128	4	3	3	6	28
1973–74	Regina Pats	WCHL	66	68	78	146	78	16	10	21	31	20
1973–74	Regina Pats	M-Cup	—	—	—	—	—	3	3	4	7	11
1974–75	Phoenix Roadrunners	WHA	78	32	45	77	36	5	4	1	5	2
1975–76	Cincinnati Stingers	WHA	79	32	40	72	74	—	—	—	—	—
1976–77	Cincinnati Stingers	WHA	81	44	52	96	38	3	0	1	1	2
1977–78	Cincinnati Stingers	WHA	23	5	9	14	22	—	—	—	—	—
1977–78	Edmonton Oilers	WHA	13	6	3	9	4	5	1	0	1	4
1978–79	Edmonton Oilers	WHA	74	26	37	63	31	12	6	6	12	4
1979–80	Detroit Red Wings	NHL	33	4	6	10	0	—	—	—	—	—
1979–80	Adirondack Red Wings	AHL	15	6	4	10	6	4	0	1	1	0
1980–81	Birmingham Bulls	CHL	5	1	3	4	0	—	—	—	—	—
1980–81	EV Zug	SWI-2	19	24	19	43	—	—	—	—	—	—
1981–82	Innsbrucker EV	AUT	—	—	—	—	—	—	—	—	—	—
1982–83	Moncton Alpines	AHL	20	5	12	17	0	—	—	—	—	—
1982–83	Quebec Nordiques	NHL	2	1	0	1	2	—	—	—	—	—
1982–83	Fredericton Express	AHL	9	7	5	12	2	12	8	4	12	10
1983–84	Innsbrucker EV	AUT	—	—	—	—	—	—	—	—	—	—
WHA totals			348	145	186	331	205	25	11	8	19	12
NHL totals			35	5	6	11	2	—	—	—	—	—

== Awards ==
- WCHL Second All-Star Team – 1972
- WCHL All-Star Team – 1974
