= Portal State Bank =

- U.S. National Register of Historic Places
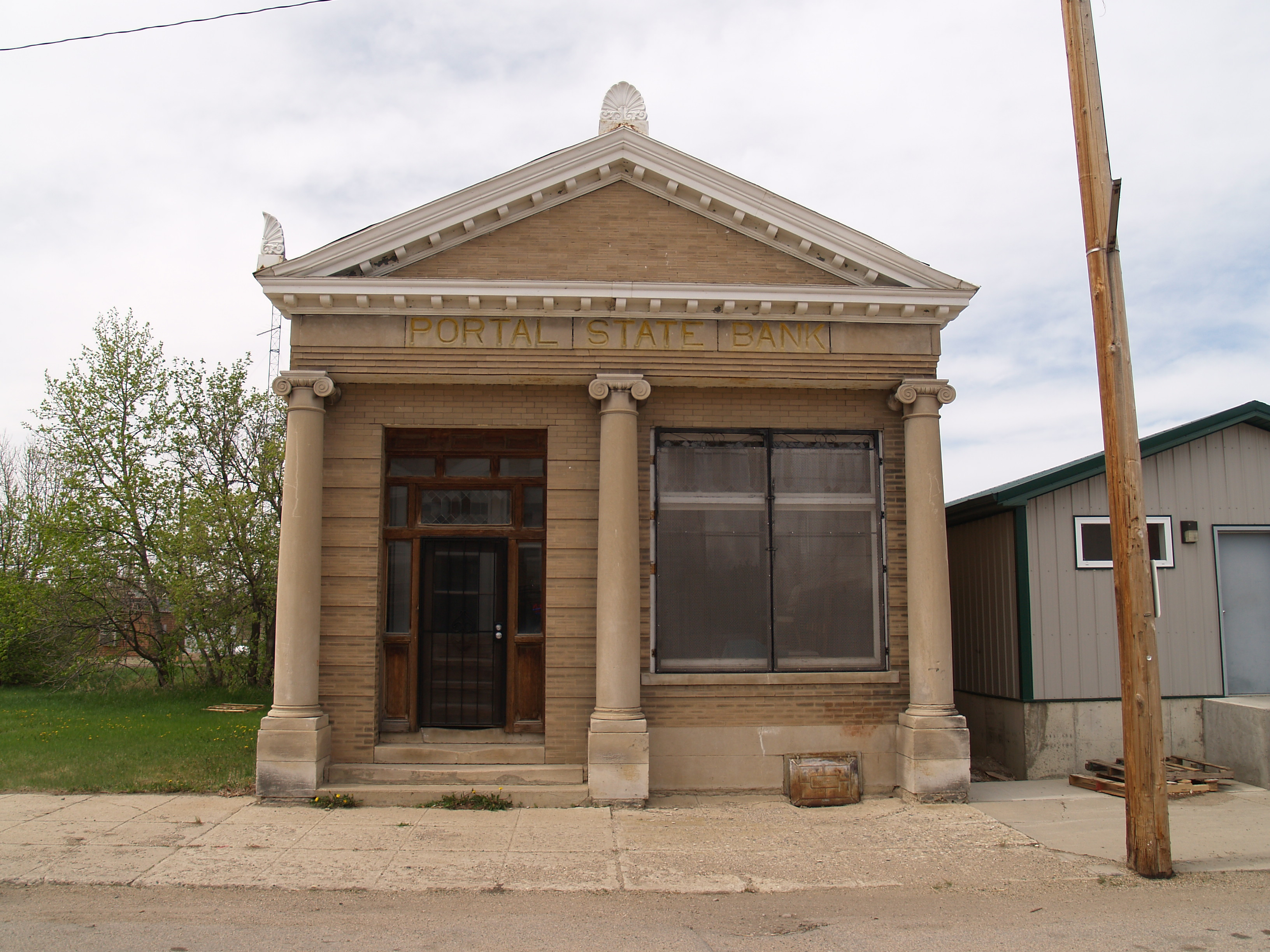

- Location within North Dakota Location within the United States
- Location: 19 Main St., Portal, North Dakota
- Coordinates: 48°59′45″N 102°32′54″W
- Area: less than one acre
- Built: 1903
- Architectural style: Classical Revival
- NRHP reference No.: 96001067
- Added to NRHP: October 3, 1996

The Portal State Bank on Main St. in Portal, North Dakota, United States, was built in 1903 in Classical Revival architecture. Also known as the Union Bank of Portal, it was listed on the National Register of Historic Places in 1996.

It was very well built and is well preserved, and is unusual in Burke County for its architecture.
