= Harry Llewellyn Fowler =

Canadian socialist organizer (1895–1980)

- Born: 6 May 1895; Prince Edward Island, Canada
- Died: 10 August 1980 (aged 85); Abbotsford, British Columbia, Canada
- Other names: Henry Llewellyn Fowler; H. L. Fowler

Harry Llewellyn Fowler (6 May 1895 – 10 August 1980) was a noted Canadian socialist organizer and key figure in the prairie co-operative movements of Saskatchewan and Western Canada from the 1930s until the 1970s.

== Biography ==
Henry "Harry" Llewellyn Fowler was born in Prince Edward Island on May 6, 1895, to "poor but honest parents." Fowler moved to Alberta with his family when he was a teenager. Dorothy Fowler has stated that her husband, "had a pretty tough time getting started in the world."

According to University of Victoria Professor Emeritus of History Ian MacPherson, speaking in 2009, Harry Fowler "played major roles in establishing the Co-op Refinery Complex, Co-operative Implements, Federated Co-operatives, Co-op Fisheries in Saskatchewan, the Funeral Co-op Association, the Medical Co-op in Regina, Co-op Trust, the Saskatchewan Co-op Credit Society, the Canadian Co-op Credit Society, and various local co-ops and credit unions." Writing in a 1987 history of the CCIL, Professor MacPherson describes Fowler as, "always a restless, creative leader," and as an "energetic, forceful, imaginative and somewhat iconoclastic co-operative leader," adding, "He was not as successful as a day-to-day manager, at least according to some observers, but as a type of leader necessary for the development of new co-operatives he played a vitally important role. More than any other person, he brought together the diverse elements needed to create the necessary momentum and raise the required capital."

== Career ==
Fowler lacked formal education and migrated to Wilcox, Saskatchewan, while working for the Bank of Nova Scotia. After leaving his bank job, Fowler entered a series of unsuccessful for-profit business ventures, including: a lease-purchase arrangement of a grain elevator, which ended when the grain elevator burned in 1928; and, sales enterprises in the oil, machinery, and insurance businesses, which ended when his house and home office burned in 1930.

In 1931, Fowler became the Secretary-Manager of the Wilcox Co-op.

=== Co-op Refinery Complex ===
With the vision of a member owned oil refinery, Consumers Co-operative Refinery Limited (CCRL) was incorporated in Regina in 1934, with Fowler appointed by its board as the first Secretary-Treasurer and Manager. Fowler sold his house in Wilcox, moving to a rented house in Regina, and started on the refinery's payroll on January 1, 1935.

Core to Fowler's vision of what eventually grew to today's Co-op Refinery Complex was linking and securing the CCRL to the larger co-operative sector. Vocal during preliminary discussions about establishing the CCRL, Fowler argued that this integration would create "an integrated co-operative structure with firm local roots, rather than just an independent central refinery." The CCRL would eventually provide significant financial resources that benefitted other co-operative units; CCRL, and its Co-op Refinery Complex, is now a wholly owned subsidiary of Federated Co-operatives, whose Tony Drummer, in a 1989 book, notes: "It provided the cash flow that made a lot of things possible. [...] If it wasn't for the Refinery, we wouldn't have anything." By the end of its first year of operation in 1935, despite the ongoing Great Depression and the fact that it had only operated six months of the year, the refinery was an immense financial success with CA$253,011 (equivalent to $5.7 million in 2025) in sales.

=== Canadian Co-operative Implements Limited (CCIL) ===
On April 23, 1940, leaders from the most prominent co-operatives across Western Canada met in Saskatoon's historic Bessborough Hotel to discuss how the costs of agriculture implements and tractors might be lowered; among them was Harry Fowler. Regarding the topic of farm machinery prices, Fowler echoed Mark Twain's comments about the weather: "Everybody talks about it, but nobody does anything about it."

=== 'Revolving Door' Plan ===
Fowler is credited with advancing a co-op dividends model termed, the 'Revolving Door' plan. Instead of paying annual dividends to members resulting from co-op profits, the austerity of the Great Depression-era led Fowler to propose that the Wilcox and CCRL co-ops retain annual profit dividends owed to each of its members for a 5-year period. Thus, while members would still receive their co-op dividends (proportional to how much they had annually purchased in goods and services from the co-op), the co-op's ability to retain those dividends for 5 years provided significant capital to improve its infrastructure and services. By the end of the 1930s most of the Saskatchewan co-operatives had adopted 'Revolving Door' plans.

== Recognition ==
The University of Saskatchewan conferred an honorary Doctor of Law degree to Harry Fowler on November 5, 1966. Presenting Fowler with his honorary degree, Political Science Professor Norman Ward's citation stated: "Harry Fowler's career epitomizes many of the most striking and admirable characteristics of life in western Canada. In addition to his extraordinarily active career in the cooperative movement, he has been a leading member of his church, of the fraternal organizations he has belonged to, and of several educational institutions including the Board of Governors of this University. From 1952 to 1956 Mr. Fowler was a member of the Royal Commission on Agriculture and Rural Life. He is, in short, one of this province's best known and most distinguished citizens."

Premier of Saskatchewan (1944-1961), Weyburn native, and "The Greatest Canadian" Tommy Douglas said of Fowler: "Who else would have the gall to even think a group of farmers could take on the giants of the oil industry and win! … A visionary who was always coming up with difficult and often seemingly impossible goals to be achieved. … No one working with H.L. Fowler could ever rest comfortably upon his oars."

== Personal life ==
Fowler married Almonte, Ontario, native Margaret R. Clint in April 1923, who died in childbirth of their son David Elwyn Clint Fowler in March 1924. Fowler and his second wife Dorothy lost two of their four children when they perished in a house fire in 1930. Fowler and Dorothy lived their later lives in Abbotsford, British Columbia, where Fowler died on August 10, 1980, at age 85.

== Memoirs ==
Fowler dictated his memoirs from 1965 to 1966, and in 1974 the Saskatchewan Co-operative Women's Guild began efforts to publish them. They eventually formed the second part of Terry Phalen's 1977 biography, Co-operative Leadership: Henry Fowler.
