= Piapot Urban Reserve =

Indian reserve in Saskatchewan, Canada

Coordinates: 50°27′38″N 104°37′09″W

- Indian reserve
- Piapot Urban Indian Reserve
- Location in Saskatchewan
- First Nation: Piapot
- Country: Canada
- Province: Saskatchewan

Area
  - Total: 0.6 ha (1.5 acres)

The Piapot Urban Reserve is an Indian reserve of the Piapot Cree Nation in Saskatchewan. It is in the city of Regina.

== See also ==
- List of Indian reserves in Saskatchewan
