= William E. Metzger House =

Historic house in North Dakota, United States

- U.S. National Register of Historic Places
- Location within North Dakota Location within the United States
- Location: 112 Makee St., Portal, North Dakota
- Coordinates: 48°59′49.3″N 102°33′11″W
- Area: less than one acre
- Built: 1905
- Architectural style: Queen Anne
- NRHP reference No.: 07000841
- Added to NRHP: August 22, 2007

The William E. Metzger House, also known as Thomas Tate House, is a Queen Anne-style residence in Portal, North Dakota, United States. Built in 1905, it was listed on the National Register of Historic Places in 2007.

It has "elegantly carved and beautifully preserved birdseye maple trim present throughout."
