= Piapot 75 =

Indian reserve in Saskatchewan, Canada

Coordinates: 50°30′10″N 104°31′00″W

- Indian reserve
- Piapot Indian Reserve No. 75
- Flag

- Location in Saskatchewan
- First Nation: Piapot
- Country: Canada
- Province: Saskatchewan

Area
  - Total: 6,243.7 ha (15,429 acres)

Population (2016)
  - Total: 516
  - Density: 8.26/km^{2} (21.4/sq mi)
- Community Well-Being Index: 55

Piapot 75 is an Indian reserve of the Piapot Cree Nation in Saskatchewan. It is about 43 kilometres (27 mi) west of Fort Qu'Appelle. In the 2016 Canadian Census, it recorded a population of 516 living in 143 of its 171 total private dwellings. In the same year, its Community Well-Being index was calculated at 55 of 100, compared to 58.4 for the average First Nations community and 77.5 for the average non-Indigenous community.

The reserve's school is Chief Payepot School.

== See also ==
- List of Indian reserves in Saskatchewan
