= Lang, Saskatchewan =

Village in Saskatchewan, Canada

Lang
- Village
- Village of Lang
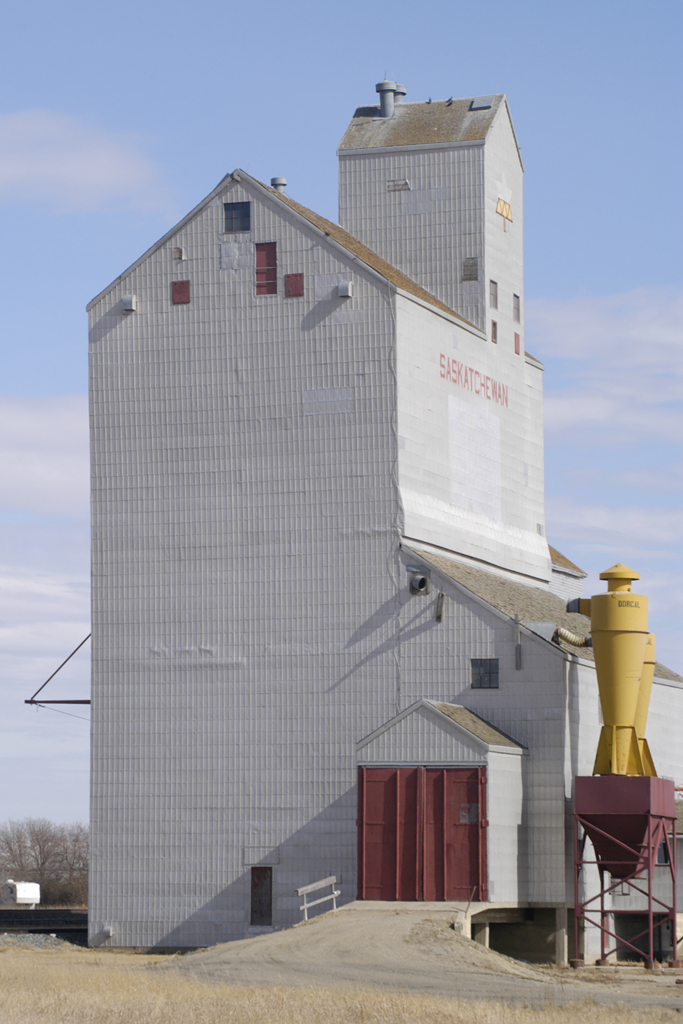
- Grain elevator in Lang

- Flag

- Lang in Saskatchewan Lang (Canada)
- Coordinates: 49.91853°N 104.37282°W
- Country: Canada
- Province: Saskatchewan
- Region: Southeast
- Census division: 2
- Rural Municipality: Scott No. 98
- Post office founded: May 15, 1904

Government
  - Type: Municipal
  - Governing body: Lang Village Council
  - Mayor: Mike Saip
  - Administrator: Darlene Wingert

Area
  - Total: 0.64 km^{2} (0.25 sq mi)

Population (2016)
  - Total: 189
  - Density: 293.8/km^{2} (761/sq mi)
- Time zone: UTC-6 (CST)
- Postal code: S0G 2W0
- Area code: 306
- Highways: CanAm Highway / Highway 39
- Website: Village of Lang

Lang (2016 population: 189) is a village in the Canadian province of Saskatchewan within the Rural Municipality of Scott No. 98 and Census Division No. 2. The village is located approximately 70 km southeast of the city of Regina.

== History ==
Lang was named after George Macdonald Lang (1860 to 1930), a civil engineer and architect, who was employed by the Canadian Pacific Railway between 1893 and 1906. Lang incorporated as a village on July 27, 1906.

The village is known for the Lang Community Skating Rink, a small facility mainly used for hockey which requires players to enter the ice (which is naturally made and manually maintained) from their dressing rooms utilizing a drawbridge-like set of stairs which require weight upon them to come down directly onto the ice surface, and then are raised back up with a counterweight when not in use. The ice surface is naturally created and manually maintained through the winter.

== Demographics ==
Population history (1981–2016)
Year	Pop.	±%
1981	219	—
1986	210	−4.1%
1991	206	−1.9%
1996	189	−8.3%
2001	189	+0.0%
2006	172	−9.0%
2011	200	+16.3%
2016	189	−5.5%
Source: Statistics Canada via Saskatchewan Bureau of Statistics

In the 2021 Census of Population conducted by Statistics Canada, Lang had a population of 176 living in 84 of its 98 total private dwellings, a change of −6.9% from its 2016 population of 189. With a land area of 0.65 km^{2} (0.25 sq mi), it had a population density of 270.8/km^{2} (701.3/sq mi) in 2021.

In the 2016 Census of Population, the Village of Lang recorded a population of 189 living in 81 of its 96 total private dwellings, a −5.8% change from its 2011 population of 200. With a land area of 0.64 km^{2} (0.25 sq mi), it had a population density of 295.3/km^{2} (764.9/sq mi) in 2016.

== Education ==
Students from Lang attend school in Milestone, of the Prairie Valley School Division.

== Notable people ==
- Dennis Sobchuk, former ice hockey player in the NHL and WHA
- Gene Sobchuk, former ice hockey player in the NHL and WHA

== See also ==
- List of communities in Saskatchewan
- List of villages in Saskatchewan
