= Drinkwater, Saskatchewan =

Village in Saskatchewan, Canada

Drinkwater
- Village
- Village of Drinkwater
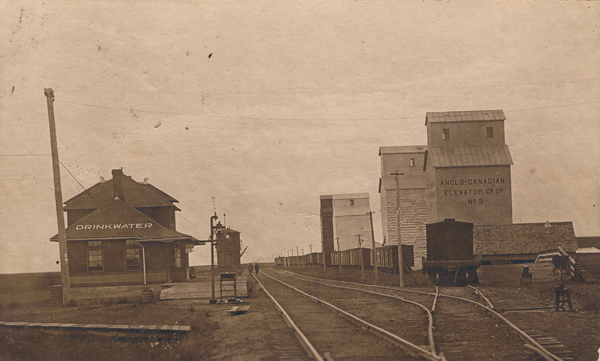
- Canadian Pacific Railway Station, Drinkwater, ca. 1908

- Location of Drinkwater in Saskatchewan Drinkwater (Canada)
- Coordinates: 50°17′44″N 105°08′09″W
- Country: Canada
- Province: Saskatchewan
- Region: Southeast
- Census division: 13
- Rural Municipality: Redburn No. 130

Government
  - Type: Municipal
  - Governing body: Drinkwater Village Council
  - Mayor: Ryan Briggs
  - Administrator: Colleen Ferguson

Area
  - Total: 2.64 km^{2} (1.02 sq mi)

Population (2016)
  - Total: 70
  - Density: 26.5/km^{2} (69/sq mi)
- Time zone: UTC-6 (CST)
- Postal code: S0H 1G0
- Area code: 306
- Highways: Highway 39
- Railways: Canadian Pacific Railway

Drinkwater (2016 population: 70) is a village in the Canadian province of Saskatchewan within the Rural Municipality of Redburn No. 130 and Census Division No. 6. The village is located along Highway 39 along the branch of the Canadian Pacific Railway, 18 miles southeast of the city of Moose Jaw and is named for "Charles Drinkwater", an original director of the CPR Railway.

== History ==
Drinkwater was incorporated as a village on June 7, 1904.

== Demographics ==
Population history (1981–2016)
Year	Pop.	±%
1981	78	—
1986	79	+1.3%
1991	78	−1.3%
1996	87	+11.5%
2001	80	−8.0%
2006	65	−18.8%
2011	65	+0.0%
2016	70	+7.7%
Source: Statistics Canada via Saskatchewan Bureau of Statistics

In the 2021 Census of Population conducted by Statistics Canada, Drinkwater had a population of 74 living in 33 of its 36 total private dwellings, a change of 5.7% from its 2016 population of 70. With a land area of 2.64 km^{2} (1.02 sq mi), it had a population density of 28.0/km^{2} (72.6/sq mi) in 2021.

In the 2016 Census of Population, the Village of Drinkwater recorded a population of 70 living in 27 of its 32 total private dwellings, a 7.1% change from its 2011 population of 65. With a land area of 2.64 km^{2} (1.02 sq mi), it had a population density of 26.5/km^{2} (68.7/sq mi) in 2016.

== Attractions ==
- Sanborn Round Barn

== See also ==
- List of communities in Saskatchewan
- List of villages in Saskatchewan
