= Yellow Grass =

Town in Saskatchewan, Canada

- Town
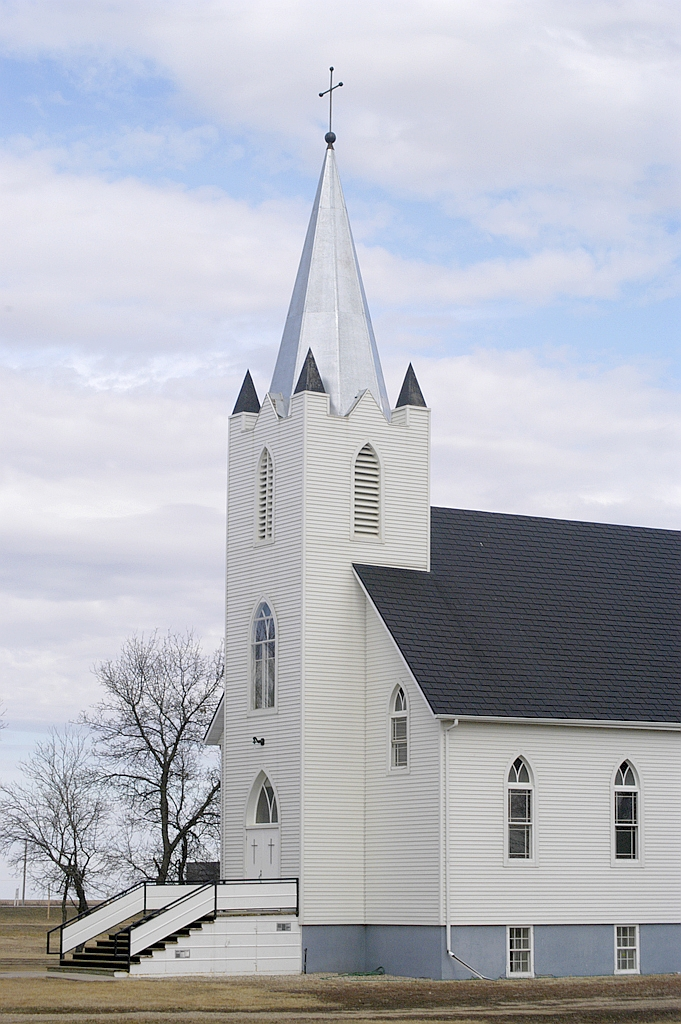
- Lutheran Church in Yellow Grass

- Location within Saskatchewan Location within Canada
- Coordinates: 49.44°N 104.15°W
- Country: Canada
- Province: Saskatchewan
- Rural municipality: Scott No. 98
- Incorporated (Village): 1903
- Incorporated (Town): 1906

Government
  - Mayor: Dave Byrns
  - MLA: Weyburn-Big Muddy, Dustin Duncan
  - MP: Souris—Moose Mountain, Robert Kitchen

Area
  - Total: 2.68 km^{2} (1.03 sq mi)
  - Land: 2.68 km^{2} (1.03 sq mi)
  - Water: 0.0 km^{2} (0 sq mi)

Population (2016)
  - Total: 478
  - Density: 178.2/km^{2} (462/sq mi)
- Time zone: CST & MST
- Postal code: S0G 5J0
- Area code: 306 or 639
- Median age: 45.9 (42.8 male, 46.9 female)
- Total private dwellings: Median household income: 212 $47,649
- Highways: CanAm Highway / Highway 39 / Highway 621
- Railways: Soo Line Railroad (Canadian Pacific Railway)

Yellow Grass is a town in southern Saskatchewan, Canada. It is located in the Rural Municipality of Scott No. 98, approximately 25 kilometres (16 mi) northwest of Weyburn, at the junction of Highways 39 and 621. The town is located on the Canadian Pacific Railway Soo Line, at an elevation of 572 metres (1,877 ft) above sea level.

The town was founded as an unincorporated village and named after the yellow prairie grass that surrounds the area. The town was built shortly after the railway line was completed in 1893. The town site itself was surveyed in 1882. The town applied to the North-West Territories government July 22, 1903 and became an incorporated village. On February 15, 1906 Yellow Grass was incorporated as a town.

The town itself has a primarily agricultural based economy. Like other Saskatchewan rural communities the town has seen a large portion of young residents leave to find work in other parts of Canada. Yellow Grass has grown little since the boom years in the early twentieth century; many resident families are descendants of the original pioneers.

== Demographics ==
In the 2021 Census of Population conducted by Statistics Canada, Yellow Grass had a population of 483 living in 191 of its 205 total private dwellings, a change of 1% from its 2016 population of 478. With a land area of 2.67 km^{2} (1.03 sq mi), it had a population density of 180.9/km^{2} (468.5/sq mi) in 2021.

== Economy ==
Yellow Grass has a primary agrarian economy, with many residents working as farmers, or providing services to farmers. Primary crops grown around Yellow Grass are wheat, durum wheat, barley, lentils, peas, canola, and flax. Some local producers also raise cattle, as well as bison and elk. A tertiary service industry provides general services for town residents and travellers along Highway 39. A substantial number of residents are employed in the nearby city of Weyburn, many in the manufacturing sector, retail sales, the health region, and in the oilfields.

Yellow Grass has gone through a couple of boom cycles in the early years of the town. The first boom started in 1899, when most of the original town infrastructure was founded. This boom attracted many new businesses to the town, as other towns were not yet as organized. This boom would level off at the start of World War I.

The second, and by far the biggest boom, started in the post war years and continued until the late 1920s as the trading area of the region. The building of Highway 39 and access to larger centres marked the beginning of decline of Yellow Grass as a commercial centre. The onset of the Great Depression and substantial crop failures would take its toll on the town.

The agricultural industry made a recovery in the post-World War II years with record setting crops, and the community recovered its municipal services. In the last few decades the economy has been relatively stagnant, with most of the town's youth leaving to find employment in larger communities. Pressures on farming due to weather and high fuel and equipment costs have been keeping the growth of agriculture in check.

== Climate and geography ==
Yellow Grass

Climate chart (precipitation, max. and min. temperature)
J	F	M	A	M	J	J	A	S	O	N	D
22 −9 −20	16 −5 −16	24 1 −10	27 12 −2	55 19 4	81 23 9	65 27 12	42 27 10	37 20 5	25 12 −2	17 1 −10	21 −6 −17
- █ Average max. and min. temperatures in °C
- █ Precipitation totals in mm
Imperial conversion
J	F	M	A	M	J	J	A	S	O	N	D
0.9 17 −4	0.6 23 3	0.9 34 14	1.1 54 28	2.2 67 39	3.2 74 49	2.6 80 53	1.7 80 51	1.4 68 40	1 53 29	0.7 34 14	0.8 21 1
- █ Average max. and min. temperatures in °F
- █ Precipitation totals in inches

Yellow Grass is in a region of Canada known as the Great Plains, and situated well into the Canadian Prairies. The area is generally flat, but provides land suitable for large-scale farming. A few small, intermittent lakes populate the surrounding area. These lakes form as a result of the spring runoff when the snow melts, and vary in size depending on annual rainfall. In hot, dry years, some lakes can completely disappear, as no streams or rivers drain into the lakes.

The climate is usually dry; however, Yellow Grass receives enough precipitation in the warmer half of the year to be classified as a humid continental climate (Dfb). The winter usually results in very cold temperatures that reach into the −20s to −30s degrees Celsius, while the summer produces relatively hot, dry temperatures. On average the temperature exceeds 35 °C (95.0 °F) 2.4 times per year. What was once the highest recorded temperature in Canadian history was set on July 5, 1937 when the temperature reached 45 °C (113.0 °F) at both Yellow Grass and at Midale, Saskatchewan, which is located 64 kilometres southeast of Yellow Grass. This record stood until June 27, 2021 when it was surpassed by Lytton, British Columbia which hit 49.6 °C (121.3 °F). The mean temperature for July is 19.1 °C (66.4 °F) and January is −14.2 °C (6.4 °F). Extreme high and low temperatures in Yellow Grass have ranged from 45 °C (113.0 °F) in July 1937 to −45.6 °C (−50.1 °F) in January 1916.

In the summer there can be fast moving and violent prairie thunderstorms. The thunderstorms can bring large hail and damaging winds.

Climate data for Yellow Grass, 1981–2010 normals, extremes 1911–present
Month	Jan	Feb	Mar	Apr	May	Jun	Jul	Aug	Sep	Oct	Nov	Dec	Year
Record high °C (°F)	13.3 (55.9)	17.8 (64.0)	23.0 (73.4)	33.0 (91.4)	39.0 (102.2)	40.0 (104.0)	45.0 (113.0)	41.6 (106.9)	38.0 (100.4)	32.2 (90.0)	24.0 (75.2)	16.7 (62.1)	45.0 (113.0)
Mean daily maximum °C (°F)	−8.5 (16.7)	−5.0 (23.0)	1.3 (34.3)	12.3 (54.1)	19.2 (66.6)	23.3 (73.9)	26.6 (79.9)	26.7 (80.1)	20.1 (68.2)	11.6 (52.9)	1.1 (34.0)	−6.1 (21.0)	10.2 (50.4)
Daily mean °C (°F)	−14.2 (6.4)	−10.5 (13.1)	−4.3 (24.3)	5.0 (41.0)	11.5 (52.7)	16.3 (61.3)	19.1 (66.4)	18.5 (65.3)	12.4 (54.3)	4.9 (40.8)	−4.4 (24.1)	−11.6 (11.1)	3.6 (38.5)
Mean daily minimum °C (°F)	−19.8 (−3.6)	−15.9 (3.4)	−9.9 (14.2)	−2.4 (27.7)	3.9 (39.0)	9.2 (48.6)	11.6 (52.9)	10.4 (50.7)	4.7 (40.5)	−1.8 (28.8)	−9.9 (14.2)	−17.1 (1.2)	−3.1 (26.4)
Record low °C (°F)	−45.6 (−50.1)	−45.0 (−49.0)	−44.4 (−47.9)	−28.9 (−20.0)	−13.3 (8.1)	−6.0 (21.2)	−1.7 (28.9)	−2.2 (28.0)	−13.3 (8.1)	−24.0 (−11.2)	−33.3 (−27.9)	−43.0 (−45.4)	−45.6 (−50.1)
Average precipitation mm (inches)	21.8 (0.86)	15.9 (0.63)	23.5 (0.93)	26.7 (1.05)	55.2 (2.17)	80.5 (3.17)	65.4 (2.57)	42.4 (1.67)	36.6 (1.44)	25.1 (0.99)	16.7 (0.66)	20.8 (0.82)	430.6 (16.95)
Average rainfall mm (inches)	0.4 (0.02)	0.2 (0.01)	5.6 (0.22)	17.9 (0.70)	51.3 (2.02)	80.4 (3.17)	65.4 (2.57)	42.4 (1.67)	35.4 (1.39)	18.0 (0.71)	1.9 (0.07)	0.3 (0.01)	319.1 (12.56)
Average snowfall cm (inches)	21.4 (8.4)	15.7 (6.2)	17.9 (7.0)	8.9 (3.5)	4.0 (1.6)	0.1 (0.0)	0.0 (0.0)	0.0 (0.0)	1.3 (0.5)	7.0 (2.8)	14.7 (5.8)	20.5 (8.1)	111.5 (43.9)
Average precipitation days (≥ 0.2 mm)	7.3	6.3	6.0	6.5	10.3	12.2	10.0	8.4	7.4	6.1	5.8	6.6	92.9
Average rainy days (≥ 0.2 mm)	0.04	0.19	1.3	4.4	9.9	12.2	10.0	8.4	7.1	4.3	1.0	0.17	59.1
Average snowy days (≥ 0.2 cm)	7.3	6.2	5.0	2.4	0.67	0.04	0.0	0.0	0.32	2.0	4.8	6.2	34.9
Source: Environment Canada

== Municipal services ==
Telephone

Yellow Grass was a pioneer in bringing telephone services to southern Saskatchewan. On April 21, 1908 the town founded the Yellow Grass Rural Telephone Company Limited, that provided telephone service to the town and surrounding areas. The company provided service to parts of southern Saskatchewan until March 1957 when the Saskatchewan provincial government purchased the company.

Power

In 1912 Yellow Grass town council passed a bylaw to appropriate $10,000 to build the first power plant in the town. The plant was an oil-burning 25 horsepower (19 kilowatt) direct current electrical generator. The town quickly outgrew the plant, and by 1920 a more economical coal-fired plant was built. In 1928 the plant was sold to the Montreal Engineering Company, and the town was hooked into the Soo Line power grid. The electric company went through a number of changes over the next couple decades before becoming part of the Saskatchewan Power Commission, which is today known as SaskPower and supplies electricity to the entire province.

Cemetery

The Yellow Grass town cemetery was established on March 8, 1905. In 1971 The Royal Canadian Legion established a memorial plot and named it the Field of Vanquished, to honour the Yellow Grass citizens who perished in war. The original cemetery is still in operation today.

Library

The Southeast Regional Library – Yellow Grass Branch, opened on January 31, 1967 after years of lobbying efforts, including letters and petitions. The Library was in the old Yellow Grass Herald publishing building. Before the library could open the town started renovating the building in 1966. Today it is located in the old Stone school.

Water works

The town of Yellow Grass first started thinking about sanitation in the early 1900s when cesspools were designated for controlled removal of sewage. In 1916 Yellow Grass purchased galvanized sanitary pails to be used in a sewage collection service. Sewer lines were installed in 1958, that system has remained largely unchanged since then. A new water treatment plant was installed in 2011, providing the town with much better water quality as before.

Education

The Yellow Grass School District no. 539 was established on March 24, 1900. The first school was built later that year known as the "Old Old School". In late 1902 a larger school was constructed known as "The Stone School". The town continued to grow, and in March 1913 a larger school was constructed known as "The Brick School".

On June 1, 1952, the Yellow Grass School District no. 539 was annexed by Milestone School Unit No. 12 when the provincial government moved to centralize school administration. Yellow Grass High School was completed on March 6, 1964. The High School has since become the only school and was renamed Yellow Grass School. In the years following Yellow Grass seen the school district boundaries change many times. The school is currently part of the Southeast Cornerstone School Division #205.

Emergency response

The town set up a volunteer fire department in June 1906 and ordered two fire engines at a cost of $972.18 each. In 1913 a by-law was passed to pay firemen $1.00 per hour during a fire, and $0.50 per hour during practice. With a bonus of $3.00 to the team that arrived first at the fire. In 1960 the first fire station was built, along with the purchase of a new pumper truck. Standby equipment was purchased in 1977.

Around 2015 Yellow Grass Fire Rescue moved into their current fire hall at 308 Railway Ave. E. In early 2015 Yellow Grass Fire Rescue purchased a used Freightliner FL80 pumper truck, designated Engine 1, to accommodate the increasing amount of necessary equipment. Due to the number of accidents on Highway 39, the need for hydraulic extrication tools arose, and in 2014 YGFR purchased Jaws of Life. In 2017 YGFR purchased a Ram 2500 utility/brush truck. Around the same time, Engine 2, a 1984 Ford fire engine, and the Rescue Unit, a modified ambulance, were retired.

Medical emergencies are handled by Sun Country Health Region EMS out of Weyburn, but the Yellow Grass Medical First Responders also respond to any medical call in town and the surrounding area, as they can render aid much sooner and handle scenes until Weyburn EMS arrives.

Police duties are handled by the Royal Canadian Mounted Police from the Milestone detachment. Yellow Grass long had a small police presence since the towns formation. When the North-West Mounted Police closed down their detachment, a holding cell was constructed in the power plant. The town also had their own municipal police service for a long number of years, but it was abolished as the RCMP took over policing of the area.

== Transportation ==
The railroad was the lifeblood of the town in the early years. Canadian Pacific Railway used to provide passenger train service to the town until the early 1960s. Since then travel to and from town is done almost exclusively by automobile. Today Highway 39 travels through town making a quick and convenient drive to Weyburn, as well as Regina and Moose Jaw. Twice daily passenger bus service used to be provided by STC, the provincially owned bus line, until STC ceased operations in May 2017.

The railway, still owned by Canadian Pacific Railway, passes right by the town, but is not being used to collect grain anymore since late 2014 when Yellow Grass' last grain elevator was torn down, following the same trend occurring all over the prairies.

== Media ==
From 1910 to the early 1930s Yellow Grass had a newspaper called the Yellow Grass Herald. The newspaper changed owners over the years, and names as well.

== Politics ==
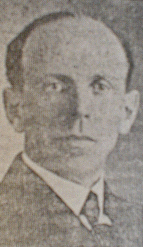
John Morrison

Yellow Grass has a town council that has been in operation since 1906. The community has been electing members since August 5, 1903 for the position of "Overseer". The overseer position is similar to that of a mayor except that there is no town council, and the primary duty is to file the annual financial statements.

When the town was incorporated in 1906, the overseer position was abolished. The town held its first election to elect a mayor and six at large councillors. Elections were held every year up until the 1970s; now the town holds elections every two years. J.H. Allen became the first mayor in a hotly contested race. The first meeting of the council occurred on March 13, 1906.

Currently, Yellow Grass is in the provincial riding of Weyburn-Big Muddy and federally in the Souris—Moose Mountain. Federally, Yellow Grass has sent one hometown resident to the House of Commons of Canada. John Morrison, a Yellow Grass area farmer, ran for the Progressive Party of Canada was first elected in 1921 and defeated in 1925. A number of residents have run for provincial legislature as well, most recently including Barry Chase in Alberta. No one from Yellow Grass has successfully been elected to a provincial legislature.

== Sports ==
Two ice hockey players from Yellow Grass have played in the National Hockey League:

- Peter Schaefer played for the Vancouver Canucks, Ottawa Senators, and the Boston Bruins
- Nolan Schaefer, Peter's brother, played goal for the San Jose Sharks

Yellow Grass had an organized ice hockey team, the Wheat Kings, that played in the Soo Line Hockey League, that went defunct in 2000. In 2016, the team joined the Big 6 Hockey League and began play in the 2016-2017 season after nearly 20 seasons of no Senior Hockey in the community. There is also a Junior C team by the same name that plays in the Qu'Appelle Valley Hockey League. The hockey rink in Yellow Grass is called the Communiplex. The government of Canada donated $11,440 to upgrade the facility as a centennial project.

Yellow Grass had a curling team that represented Western Canada in the very first Brier. They finished in a three-way tie for third place. The town named the local curling rink The Barkwell Rink in honour of the skip O.S. Barkwell. The rink was demolished in 1946, and a new rink named the Memorial Rink was completed in 1948.

In the summertime baseball is the preferred sport, with the "Wheat Kings" teams going back to the early 1900s. All styles of organized baseball have been played including fastpitch softball, slow pitch, and hard ball.

== The impact of war on Yellow Grass ==
During World War I and World War II the prairie provinces sent a significant portion of residents to fight for the Canadian Forces overseas. Yellow Grass was no exception, sending over 32% of the town population to fight in the Second World War.

Yellow Grass would send two men to fight in the Second Boer War; both returned from combat safely. During the First World War 42 men went overseas to fight, unfortunately 14 would perish in combat, marking the most significant loss for the town during wartime.

Yellow Grass sent a significant number of men to fight in the Second World War. There was a noticeable drain on the town as 167 of the 512 residents went overseas. Ten men from the town died in combat. During both world wars, most of the organized clubs and sports teams halted operations, and the remaining residents focused on farming. Many of the men who fought were descendants of the first Yellow Grass soldiers in the First World War.

In 1971 the Royal Canadian Legion dedicated a special section of the Yellow Grass Cemetery known as the Field of Vanquished to the Yellow Grass war dead.

== See also ==
- List of towns in Saskatchewan

Books about Yellow Grass
Title	Published by	Year
Yellow Grass: 50 Years in the wheat	King Community	1955
Yellow Grass: Our Prairie Community	Yellow Grass Heritage Society	1981
