= Rural Municipality of Lajord No. 128 =

Rural municipality in Saskatchewan, Canada

Lajord No. 128
- Rural municipality
- Rural Municipality of Lajord No. 128
- Location of the RM of Lajord No. 128 in Saskatchewan
- Coordinates: 50.196°N 104.251°W
- Country: Canada
- Province: Saskatchewan
- Census division: 6
- SARM division: 2
- Federal riding: Souris—Moose Mountain
- Provincial riding: Indian Head-Milestone
- Formed: December 13, 1909

Government
  - Reeve: Armond Gervais
  - Governing body: RM of Lajord No. 128 Council
  - Administrator: Lynette Herauf
  - Office location: Lajord

Area (2016)
  - Land: 943.87 km^{2} (364.43 sq mi)

Population (2016)
  - Total: 1,232
  - Density: 1.3/km^{2} (3.4/sq mi)
- Time zone: CST
  - Summer (DST): CST
- Postal code: S0G 2V0
- Area codes: 306 and 639

The Rural Municipality of Lajord No. 128 (2016 population: 1,232) is a rural municipality (RM) in the Canadian province of Saskatchewan within Census Division No. 6 and SARM Division No. 2. It is located in the southeast portion of the province.

== History ==
The RM of Lajord No. 128 incorporated as a rural municipality on December 13, 1909.

Heritage properties

There are three historical buildings located within the RM.

- Church and Grotto in St. Peter's Colony (now called St. Peter's Colony) - Constructed in 1905 as a church and shrine of our Lady of Lourdes.
- Kronau Cemetery Site (formerly called Bethlehem Lutheran Church Cemetery; and now called the Kronau Bethlehem Heritage Cemetery) - Constructed in 1896, by early German-Russian Lutheran homesteaders. The cemetery is near the site of a former one room school house where services were held until a church was constructed. The cemetery is located near the hamlet of Kronau.

== Geography ==
=== Communities and localities ===
The following unincorporated communities are within the RM.

Organized hamlets

- Davin
- Gray
- Kronau
- Riceton

Unorganized hamlets

- Lajord

== Demographics ==
Population history (1981–2016)
Year	Pop.	±%
1981	1,085	—
1986	1,104	+1.8%
1991	1,032	−6.5%
1996	1,034	+0.2%
2001	1,036	+0.2%
2006	977	−5.7%
2011	993	+1.6%
2016	1,232	+24.1%
Source: Statistics Canada via Saskatchewan Bureau of Statistics

In the 2021 Census of Population conducted by Statistics Canada, the RM of Lajord No. 128 had a population of 985 living in 345 of its 391 total private dwellings, a change of −20% from its 2016 population of 1,232. With a land area of 945.1 km^{2} (364.9 sq mi), it had a population density of 1.0/km^{2} (2.7/sq mi) in 2021.

In the 2016 Census of Population, the RM of Lajord No. 128 recorded a population of 1,232 living in 417 of its 473 total private dwellings, a 24.1% change from its 2011 population of 993. With a land area of 943.87 km^{2} (364.43 sq mi), it had a population density of 1.3/km^{2} (3.4/sq mi) in 2016.

== Government ==
The RM of Lajord No. 128 is governed by an elected municipal council and an appointed administrator that meets on the second Tuesday of every month. The reeve of the RM is Armond Gervais while its administrator is Lynette Herauf. The RM's office is located in Lajord.
