= North Portal =

Village in Saskatchewan, Canada

- Village
- Village of North Portal
- Location within Coalfields No. 4 Location within Saskatchewan Location within North America
- Coordinates: 49.0015°N 102.5539°W
- Country: Canada
- Province: Saskatchewan
- Region: Southeast
- Census division: 1
- Rural Municipality: Coalfields
- Post office Founded: N/A
- Incorporated (Village): N/A
- Incorporated (Town): N/A

Government
  - Mayor: Amy Armstrong
  - Administrator: Lindsay Arnold
  - Governing body: North Portal Village Council

Area
  - Total: 2.49 km^{2} (0.96 sq mi)

Population (2006)
  - Total: 123
  - Density: 54.7/km^{2} (142/sq mi)
- Time zone: UTC−06:00 (CST)
- Postal code: S0C 1W0
- Area code: 306
- Highways: Highway 39 / Highway 604

North Portal (2016 population: 115) is a village in the Canadian province of Saskatchewan within the Rural Municipality of Coalfields No. 4 and Census Division No. 1. It is adjacent to the Canada–United States border opposite Portal, North Dakota. The border crossing is considered the major entry point to and from the U.S. within Saskatchewan (connecting Saskatchewan Highway 39 to US Route 52).

== History ==
North Portal incorporated as a village on November 16, 1903.

== Attractions ==
A notable tourist attraction is the Gateway Cities Golf Club, located next to the village. Eight of the course's nine holes are located within Canada, but the course's ninth hole, and the clubhouse, are located in the United States.

== Demographics ==
Population history (1981–2016)
| Year | Pop. | ±% |
|---|---|---|
| 1981 | 164 | — |
| 1986 | 175 | +6.7% |
| 1991 | 164 | −6.3% |
| 1996 | 148 | −9.8% |
| 2001 | 136 | −8.1% |
| 2006 | 123 | −9.6% |
| 2011 | 143 | +16.3% |
| 2016 | 115 | −19.6% |
Source: Statistics Canada via Saskatchewan Bureau of Statistics

In the 2021 Census of Population conducted by Statistics Canada, North Portal had a population of 113 living in 53 of its 62 total private dwellings, a change of −1.7% from its 2016 population of 115. With a land area of 2.65 km^{2} (1.02 sq mi), it had a population density of 42.6/km^{2} (110.4/sq mi) in 2021.

In the 2016 Census of Population, the Village of North Portal recorded a population of 115 living in 52 of its 66 total private dwellings, a −24.3% change from its 2011 population of 143. With a land area of 2.49 km^{2} (0.96 sq mi), it had a population density of 46.2/km^{2} (119.6/sq mi) in 2016.

== See also ==
- List of communities in Saskatchewan
- List of francophone communities in Saskatchewan
- List of villages in Saskatchewan
