= Estlin, Saskatchewan =

- Unincorporated
- Location of Estlin in Saskatchewan
- Coordinates: 50°15′05″N 104°31′42″W
- Country: Canada
- Province: Saskatchewan
- Region: Southwest Saskatchewan
- Rural Municipality: Bratt's Lake No. 129
- Post office established: 1913-06-01
- Post office closed: 1969-12-31
- Postal code: NA
- Area code: 306
- Highways: Highway 306

Estlin is a hamlet in Saskatchewan, Canada 22 km south of Regina. Little remains of the former village, except for some private residences and the rail lines near the town. The town once contained an elevator.

The Buck Lake Cemetery is located at the site, dating from 1890.

The hamlet is also the site for an Alliance Pipeline pumping station with a heat-recovery 6 MW power generating unit operated by NRGreen Power.

== History ==
Estlin was founded in 1912 when the Grand Trunk Railway laid a railroad line through the area. The first settlers lived just south of the town beginning in the 1880s. The town peaked in the 1920s. It boasted a school, church, post office, general store, livery, blacksmith, stockyards, lumber yard, tinsmith, cafe, elevators, pool house, slaughterhouse and a machinery warehouse. The United Church was constructed in 1906 and moved to Estlin in 1913. During the 1920s, fires destroyed several buildings, but most were rebuilt. In 1947, the lumber yard was converted into a curling and skating rink. In 1969, the train station closed. The school operated from 1926 to 1973 and had a baseball team. The school was demolished in the 2010s. The town's population was never greater than 50.

== See also ==
- List of communities in Saskatchewan
- List of hamlets in Saskatchewan
