= Colfax, Saskatchewan =

Coordinates: 49.946°N 103.998°W

Colfax is an unincorporated community in Wellington Rural Municipality No. 97 in the province of Saskatchewan, Canada. Located on highway 306, approximately 40 km north of the city of Weyburn. The community was founded in 1912, settled primarily by American immigrants from Iowa. The community was named by B.A. Brown, after Colfax, Iowa. The current population of Colfax is 6 people.

== Notable residents ==
- Wendy Leach, world curling champion, 1950.

== See also ==
- List of communities in Saskatchewan
- Colfax, Iowa
