= Portal–North Portal Border Crossing =

Border crossing between Canada and the United States

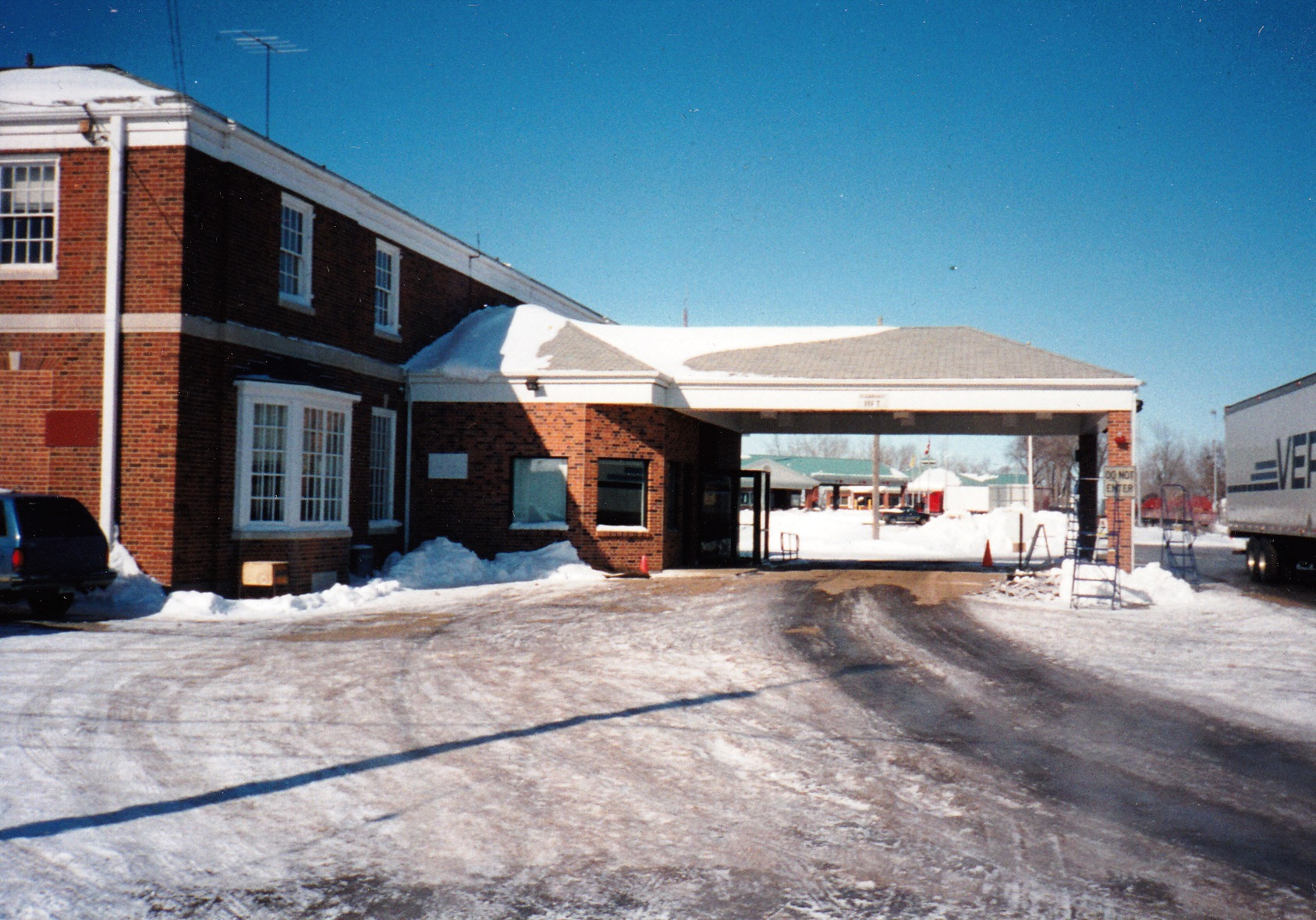
- US Border Inspection Station at Portal, ND, 1998. Since then, a green building replaced this.

Locaiton
- Country: United States; Canada
- Location: US 52 / Highway 39; US Port: 301 W Railway Ave, Portal, North Dakota 58772; Canadian Port: Saskatchewan Highway 39, North Portal, Saskatchewan S0C 1W0
- Coordinates: 48°59′56″N 102°33′08″W

Details
- Opened: 1893

Website
- US Canadian

The Portal–North Portal Border Crossing connects the city of Portal, North Dakota and the village of North Portal, Saskatchewan on the Canada–US border. U.S. Route 52 on the American side joins Saskatchewan Highway 39 on the Canadian side.

== Canadian side ==
In 1893, the Canadian Pacific Railway (CP) built southward to connect with the Minneapolis, St. Paul and Sault Ste. Marie Railroad that had built northward. A.C. Paterson was the inaugural border officer 1893–1911. Administrative oversight transferred from the Port of Winnipeg to the Port of Calgary in 1896 and to the Port of Regina in 1902. The status was upgraded to the Port of North Portal in 1904. An animal quarantine station was established to handle considerable animal movements.

North Portal was a centre of illegal export during Prohibition in the United States.

Canada replaced its wood bungalow-style border station in 1955 with a two-story brick and glass structure, then again in 1987 with a single-story sprawling brick structure with an attached three-lane canopy.

== US side ==
The border patrol station at Portal was established in 1924.

The Gateway Cities Golf Club course, which was created in 1931, is adjacent to this crossing. While eight of the nine holes are in Canada, the ninth green (along with the clubhouse) is in the US, requiring golfers to hit a shot across an international border.

The US replaced its 1937 red brick border station with a large green modern facility in 2012.

In 2012, imaging technology detected five Canadians concealed aboard a railroad locomotive. In 2021, officers discovered and seized CA$645,245 in unreported Canadian currency during a vehicle inspection. That year, officers intercepted a US$6 million illegal marijuana shipment.

== Traffic volumes ==
During earlier decades, passenger trains created most of the customs work. To expedite inspections, Canadian and US customs officers processed passengers while the trains were en route. Highway construction in the 1930s resulted in substantial volumes of tourist traffic, further increased once these arteries were paved. The introduction of large highway transport trucks led to a significant expansion in northbound freight.

This crossing, the only 24-hour one on the North Dakota–Saskatchewan border, is the second-busiest in North Dakota. CP transports considerable freight volumes over this crossing.

== See also ==
- List of Canada–United States border crossings
