= Bechard, Saskatchewan =

Community in Saskatchewan, Canada

Coordinates: 50°03′40″N 104°13′28″W

Location of Bechard in Saskatchewan

Bechard is an unincorporated community in the Canadian province of Saskatchewan.
