= Piapot First Nation =

First Nation in Saskatchewan, Canada

- Band No. 385
- Flag of the Piapot First Nation
- People: Cree
- Treaty: Treaty 4
- Headquarters: Zehner
- Province: Saskatchewan

Land
- Main reserve: Piapot 75
- Reserves: Haylands 75A; Piapot 75H; Last Mountain Lake 80A; Piapot Urban Reserve
- Land area: 188.623 km^{2} (72.828 sq mi)

Population (2021)
- On reserve: 686
- Off reserve: 1865
- Total population: 2551

Government
- Chief: Mark Fox

Tribal Council
- File Hills Qu'Appelle Tribal Council

Website
- piapotfirstnation.com

Piapot First Nation (Cree: ᓀᐦᐃᔭᐏᑇᑎᓈᕽ nêhiyaw-pwâtinâhk) is a Cree First Nation in southern Saskatchewan, Canada.

== Reserves ==
- Haylands 75A
- Last Mountain Lake 80A
- Piapot 75
- Piapot 75E
- Piapot Cree First Nation 75F
- Piapot Cree First Nation 75G
- Piapot Cree First Nation 75H
- Piapot Cree First Nation 75I
- Piapot Cree First Nation 75J
- Piapot Cree First Nation 75K
- Piapot First Nation 75T
- Piapot Urban Reserve
- Treaty Four Reserve Grounds 77
