= Riceton, Saskatchewan =

Coordinates: 50°06′34″N 104°19′09″W

Riceton is a hamlet in the Canadian province of Saskatchewan. Located within the Rural Municipality of Lajord No. 128, it lies along Saskatchewan Highway 306 just west of its intersection with Highway 622, roughly 35 kilometres (22 mi) southeast of Regina.

== History ==
The first grain elevator was built in 1913. By 1968 Riceton's population was 128.

=== Name ===
According to a collectively-researched 1968 publication on Saskatchewan place name origins, Riceton was named after J. S. Rice who owned the land on which the town was incorporated.

== Demographics ==
In the 2021 Census of Population conducted by Statistics Canada, Riceton had a population of 33 living in 21 of its 27 total private dwellings, a change of -45.9% from its 2016 population of 61. With a land area of 0.61 km^{2} (0.24 sq mi), it had a population density of 54.1/km^{2} (140.1/sq mi) in 2021.
