= Rural Municipality of Bratt's Lake No. 129 =

Rural municipality in Saskatchewan, Canada

Bratt's Lake No. 129
- Rural municipality
- Rural Municipality of Bratt's Lake No. 129
- Location of the RM of Bratt's Lake No. 129 in Saskatchewan
- Coordinates: 50.162°N 104.679°W
- Country: Canada
- Province: Saskatchewan
- Census division: 6
- SARM division: 2
- Federal riding: Moose Jaw—Lake Centre—Lanigan
- Provincial riding: Indian Head-Milestone; Lumsden-Morse
- Formed: January 1, 1913

Government
  - Reeve: J. Barry Hamdorf
  - Governing body: RM of Bratt's Lake No. 129 Council
  - Administrator: Linda Klimm
  - Office location: Wilcox

Area (2016)
  - Land: 844.94 km^{2} (326.23 sq mi)

Population (2016)
  - Total: 315
  - Density: 0.4/km^{2} (1.0/sq mi)
- Time zone: CST
  - Summer (DST): CST
- Postal code: S0G 5E0
- Area codes: 306 and 639

The Rural Municipality of Bratt's Lake No. 129 (2016 population: 315) is a rural municipality (RM) in the Canadian province of Saskatchewan within Census Division No. 6 and SARM Division No. 2.

== History ==
The RM of Bratt's Lake No. 129 incorporated as a rural municipality on January 1, 1913.

== Geography ==
=== Communities and localities. ===
The following urban municipalities are surrounded by the RM.

Villages

- Wilcox

The following unincorporated communities are located within the RM.

Localities

- Corinne
- Diana
- Estlin

== Demographics ==
Population history (1981–2016)
Year	Pop.	±%
1981	477	—
1986	433	−9.2%
1991	391	−9.7%
1996	371	−5.1%
2001	374	+0.8%
2006	362	−3.2%
2011	350	−3.3%
2016	315	−10.0%
Source: Statistics Canada via Saskatchewan Bureau of Statistics

In the 2021 Census of Population conducted by Statistics Canada, the RM of Bratt's Lake No. 129 had a population of 328 living in 130 of its 147 total private dwellings, a change of 4.1% from its 2016 population of 315. With a land area of 844.71 km^{2} (326.14 sq mi), it had a population density of 0.4/km^{2} (1.0/sq mi) in 2021.

In the 2016 Census of Population, the RM of Bratt's Lake No. 129 recorded a population of 315 living in 129 of its 149 total private dwellings, a −10% change from its 2011 population of 350. With a land area of 844.94 km^{2} (326.23 sq mi), it had a population density of 0.4/km^{2} (1.0/sq mi) in 2016.

== Government ==
The RM of Bratt's Lake No. 129 is governed by an elected municipal council and an appointed administrator that meets on the second Tuesday of every month. The reeve of the RM is J. Barry Hamdorf while its administrator is Linda Klimm. The RM's office is located in Wilcox.
