= Gray, Saskatchewan =

Coordinates: 50°10′14″N 104°26′40″W

Gray is a hamlet in the Canadian province of Saskatchewan. Gray is about 40 km southeast of Regina.

== Demographics ==
In the 2021 Census of Population conducted by Statistics Canada, Gray had a population of 58 living in 24 of its 27 total private dwellings, a change of -38.3% from its 2016 population of 94. With a land area of 0.28 km^{2} (0.11 sq mi), it had a population density of 207.1/km^{2} (536.5/sq mi) in 2021.
