= Lewvan =

Unincorporated community in Saskatchewan, Canada

Coordinates: 50.000°N 104.116°W

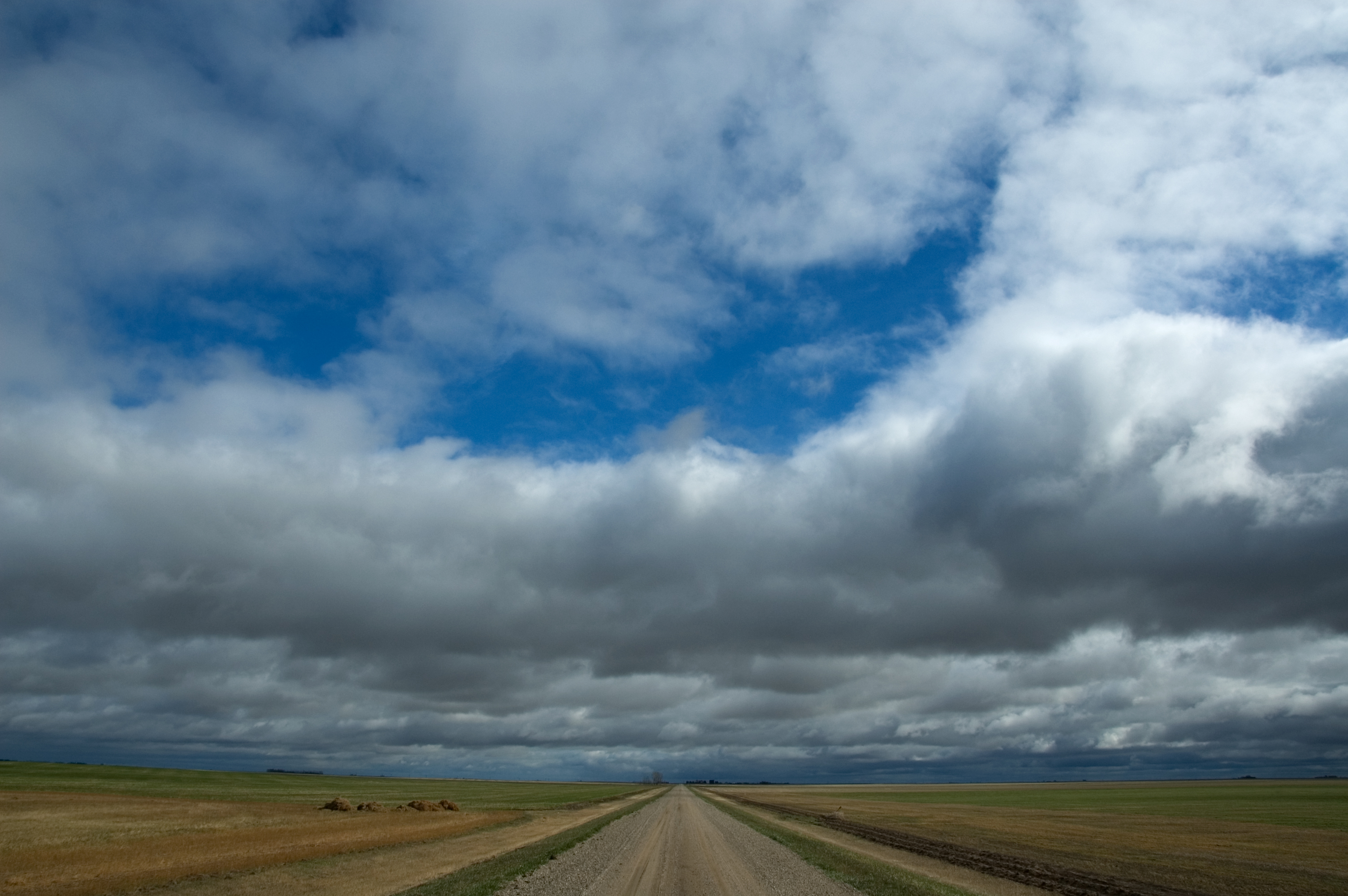
Scenery near Lewvan

Lewvan is an unincorporated community in Rural Municipality of Scott No. 98 in Saskatchewan, Canada. Located on Highway 306, approximately 53 kilometres (33 mi) northwest of the city of Weyburn. The community was named by the Grand Trunk Railway after Lewis W. Van Nostrand, the original owner of the town site in 1902, in 1911 the Grand Trunk laid out the town of Lewvan.

== Transportation ==
Highways 306, 621, and 710 pass through Lewvan. To the southeast is the Lewvan (Farr Air) Airport which supports local air traffic.

== See also ==
- List of communities in Saskatchewan
