= Rural Municipality of Caledonia No. 99 =

Rural municipality in Saskatchewan, Canada

Caledonia No. 99
- Rural municipality
- Rural Municipality of Caledonia No. 99
- Location of the RM of Caledonia No. 99 in Saskatchewan
- Coordinates: 49.890°N 104.727°W
- Country: Canada
- Province: Saskatchewan
- Census division: 2
- SARM division: 2
- Federal riding: Moose Jaw—Lake Centre—Lanigan
- Provincial riding: Indian Head-Milestone; Weyburn-Big Muddy
- Formed: December 13, 1909

Government
  - Reeve: Mark Beck
  - Governing body: RM of Caledonia No. 99 Council
  - Administrator: Stephen Schury
  - Office location: Milestone

Area (2016)
  - Land: 845.68 km^{2} (326.52 sq mi)

Population (2016)
  - Total: 245
  - Density: 0.3/km^{2} (0.78/sq mi)
- Time zone: CST
  - Summer (DST): CST
- Postal code: S0G 3L0
- Area codes: 306 and 639

The Rural Municipality of Caledonia No. 99 (2016 population: 245) is a rural municipality (RM) in the Canadian province of Saskatchewan within Census Division No. 2 and SARM Division No. 2. It is located in the southeast portion of the province.

== History ==
The RM of Caledonia No. 99 incorporated as a rural municipality on December 13, 1909.

Heritage properties

There is one historical building located within the RM.

- Bethesda Lutheran Church - Constructed in 1912, and located within Bethesda. The church operated from 1912 until 1973.

== Geography ==
=== Communities and localities ===
The following urban municipalities are surrounded by the RM.

Towns

- Milestone

The following unincorporated communities are located within the RM.

Organized hamlets

- Parry

Localities

- Dummer

== Demographics ==
Population history (1981–2016)
Year	Pop.	±%
1981	524	—
1986	530	+1.1%
1991	462	−12.8%
1996	409	−11.5%
2001	328	−19.8%
2006	286	−12.8%
2011	257	−10.1%
2016	245	−4.7%
Source: Statistics Canada via Saskatchewan Bureau of Statistics

In the 2021 Census of Population conducted by Statistics Canada, the RM of Caledonia No. 99 had a population of 225 living in 91 of its 114 total private dwellings, a change of −8.2% from its 2016 population of 245. With a land area of 846.76 km^{2} (326.94 sq mi), it had a population density of 0.3/km^{2} (0.7/sq mi) in 2021.

In the 2016 Census of Population, the RM of Caledonia No. 99 recorded a population of 245 living in 97 of its 113 total private dwellings, a −4.7% change from its 2011 population of 257. With a land area of 845.68 km^{2} (326.52 sq mi), it had a population density of 0.3/km^{2} (0.8/sq mi) in 2016.

== Government ==
The RM of Caledonia No. 99 is governed by an elected municipal council and an appointed administrator that meets on the first Tuesday of every month. The reeve of the RM is Mark Beck while its administrator is Stephen Schury. The RM's office is located in Milestone.
