= Rural Municipality of Scott No. 98 =

Rural municipality in Saskatchewan, Canada

Scott No. 98
- Rural municipality
- Rural Municipality of Scott No. 98
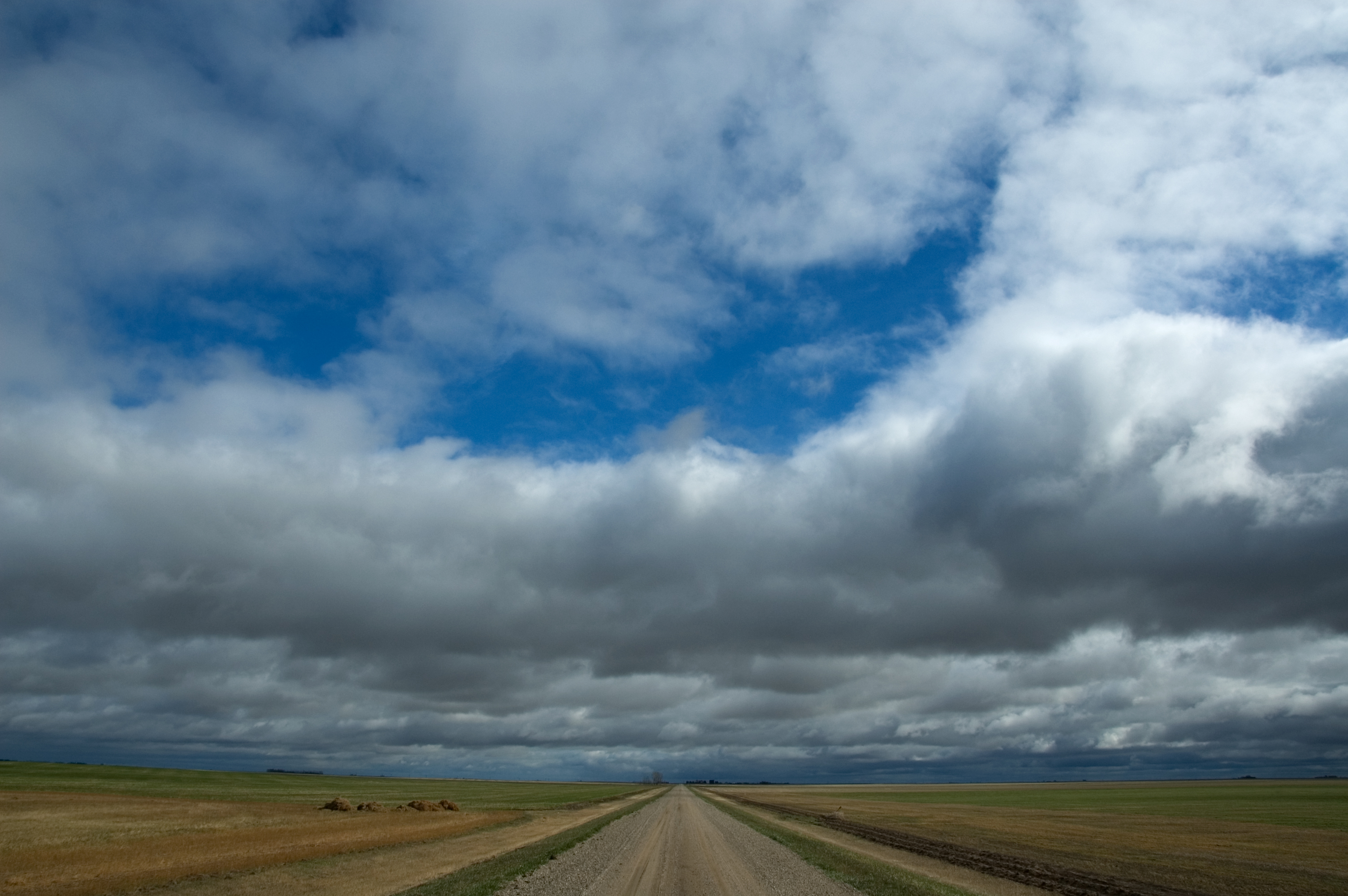
- Open prairie near Lewvan

- Location of the RM of Scott No. 98 in Saskatchewan
- Coordinates: 49.900°N 104.240°W
- Country: Canada
- Province: Saskatchewan
- Census division: 2
- SARM division: 2
- Federal riding: Souris—Moose Mountain
- Provincial riding: Indian Head-Milestone; Weyburn-Big Muddy
- Formed: December 13, 1909

Government
  - Reeve: Ryley Richards
  - Governing body: RM of Scott No. 98 Council
  - Administrator: Shelly Verbeurgt
  - Office location: Yellow Grass

Area (2016)
  - Land: 850.08 km^{2} (328.22 sq mi)

Population (2016)
  - Total: 195
  - Density: 0.2/km^{2} (0.52/sq mi)
- Time zone: CST
  - Summer (DST): CST
- Postal code: S0G 5J0
- Area codes: 306 and 639

The Rural Municipality of Scott No. 98 (2016 population: 195) is a rural municipality (RM) in the Canadian province of Saskatchewan within Census Division No. 2 and SARM Division No. 2. It is located in the southeast portion of the province.

== History ==
The RM of Scott No. 98 was incorporated as a rural municipality on December 13, 1909.

== Geography ==
=== Communities and localities ===
The following urban municipalities are surrounded by the RM.

Villages

- Yellow Grass
- Lang

The following unincorporated communities are within the RM.

Localities

- Lewvan
- Ibsen

== Demographics ==
Population history (1981–2016)
Year	Pop.	±%
1981	425	—
1986	371	−12.7%
1991	343	−7.5%
1996	299	−12.8%
2001	235	−21.4%
2006	176	−25.1%
2011	176	+0.0%
2016	195	+10.8%
Source: Statistics Canada via Saskatchewan Bureau of Statistics

In the 2021 Census of Population conducted by Statistics Canada, the RM of Scott No. 98 had a population of 215 living in 86 of its 105 total private dwellings, a change of 10.3% from its 2016 population of 195. With a land area of 846.58 km^{2} (326.87 sq mi), it had a population density of 0.3/km^{2} (0.7/sq mi) in 2021.

In the 2016 Census of Population, the RM of Scott No. 98 recorded a population of 195 living in 78 of its 94 total private dwellings, a 10.8% change from its 2011 population of 176. With a land area of 850.08 km^{2} (328.22 sq mi), it had a population density of 0.2/km^{2} (0.6/sq mi) in 2016.

== Economy ==
Agriculture is the major industry in the RM.

== Government ==
The RM of Scott No. 98 is governed by an elected municipal council and an appointed administrator who meets on the second Tuesday of every month. The reeve of the RM is Ryley Richards while its administrator is Shelly Verbeurgt. The RM's office is located in Yellow Grass.

== Transportation ==
The Lewvan (Farr Air) Airport is within the rural municipality.

== See also ==
- List of rural municipalities in Saskatchewan
