= Milestone, Saskatchewan =

Town in Saskatchewan, Canada

Milestone
- Town
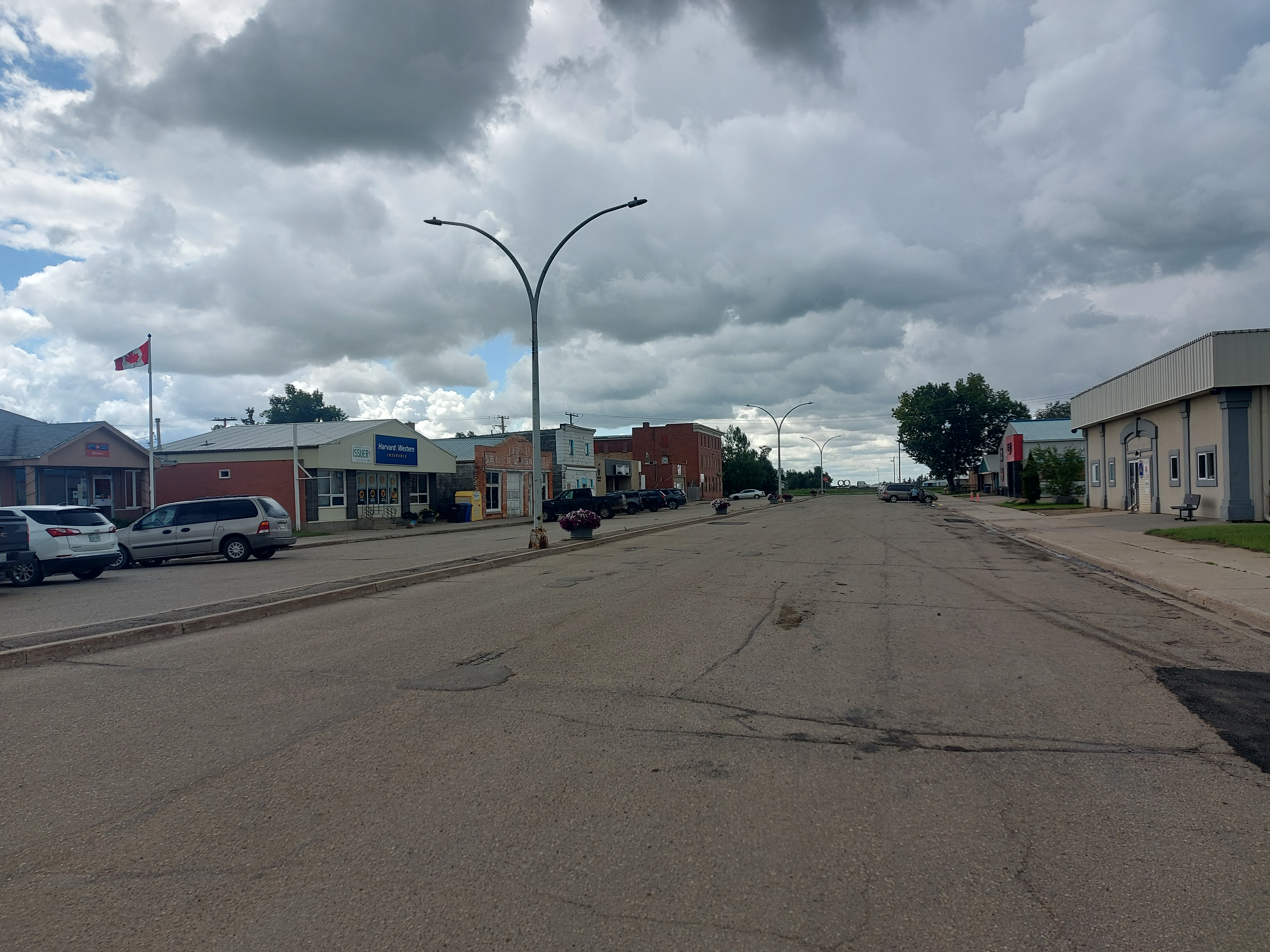
- Main Street in downtown Milestone

- Flag

- Location of Milestone in Saskatchewan Milestone (Canada)
- Coordinates: 49.992°N 104.524°W
- Country: Canada
- Province: Saskatchewan
- Census division: 2
- Rural Municipality: Caledonia
- Post office Founded: May 1, 1900
- Incorporated (Village of the North-West Territories): March 14, 1903
- Incorporated (Town): 1906

Government
  - Mayor: Jeff Brown
  - Town Administrator: Stephen Schury
  - Governing body: Milestone Town Council

Area
  - Total: 2.17 km^{2} (0.84 sq mi)

Population (2016)
  - Total: 699
  - Density: 321.7/km^{2} (833/sq mi)
- Time zone: CST
- Postal code: S0G 3L0
- Area code: 306
- Highways: CanAm Highway / Highway 39 / Highway 710
- Waterways: Souris River
- Website: milestonesk.ca

Milestone is a town in southeast Saskatchewan, Canada, on Highway 39. The town was named after C. W. Milestone (superintendent of the New Soo Line) in 1893. The town serves as a service centre for the neighbouring countryside with the area's economy dominated by agriculture.

Two churches offer services — Milestone Alliance Church and The Lighthouse Church. Other facilities provided within the town include a public pool, campground, ice rink and various shops and services.

== Demographics ==
In the 2021 Census of Population conducted by Statistics Canada, Milestone had a population of 682 living in 264 of its 291 total private dwellings, a change of −2.4% from its 2016 population of 699. With a land area of 2.12 km^{2} (0.82 sq mi), it had a population density of 321.7/km^{2} (833.2/sq mi) in 2021.

== Education ==
Milestone Elementary School teaches Kindergarten to Grade 4 while Milestone High School offers classes up to Grade 12.

== Notable people ==
- Garth Boesch, former National Hockey League player

== See also ==
- List of communities in Saskatchewan
- List of towns in Saskatchewan
