= Saskatchewan Highway 6 =

Provincial highway in Saskatchewan, Canada

Highway 6
- CanAm Highway (segment)
- Highway 6 highlighted in red

Route information
- Maintained by Ministry of Highways and Infrastructure & Transport Canada
- Length: 518.1 km (321.9 mi)

Major junctions
- South end: MT 16 at the U.S. border in Regway
- Highway 18 near Minton; Highway 13 near Pangman; Highway 39 / CanAm Highway at Corinne; Highway 1 (TCH) in Regina; Highway 22 in Southey; Highway 15 in Raymore; Highway 16 (TCH/YH) at Dafoe; Highway 5 in Watson; Highway 3 / Highway 41 / CanAm Highway in Melfort
- North end: Highway 55 near Choiceland

Location
- Country: Canada
- Province: Saskatchewan
- Rural municipalities: Surprise Valley No. 9, The Gap No. 39, Norton No. 69, Caledonia No. 99, Bratt's Lake No. 129, Lumsden No. 189, Longlaketon No. 219, Touchwood No. 248, Cupar No. 218, Mount Hope No. 279, Prairie Rose No. 309, Spalding No. 368, Star City No. 428, Kinistino No. 459, Pleasantdale No. 398, Willow Creek No. 458, Nipawin No. 487, Torch River No. 488
- Major cities: Melfort, Regina

Highway system
- Provincial highways in Saskatchewan
← Highway 5	→ Highway 7

Highway 6 is a major provincial highway in Saskatchewan, Canada. It runs from Montana Highway 16 at the Canada–US border at the Port of Regway to Highway 55 just south of Choiceland. Highway 6 is part of the CanAm Highway from Corinne, through Regina, to Melfort for a distance of about 326 kilometres (203 mi). Regina and Melfort are the only cities along the highway's route. Highway 6 is about 518 kilometres (322 mi) long.

Major provincial highways that Highway 6 intersects include 18, 13 (Red Coat Trail), 39, 1 (Trans-Canada Highway), 11A (Louis Riel Trail), 22, 15, 16 (Yellowhead Highway), 5, 3, 41, and 55 (Northern Woods and Water Route).

== Route description ==
The southern terminus of Highway 6 begins at the Canada–United States border in a hilly region of the Missouri Coteau and travels in a northerly direction through the relatively flat prairies en route to the southern edge of the boreal forest. Most of the highway is part of the CanAm Highway system. Highway 6 crosses major rivers, traverses plateaus, passes alongside large lakes, provides access to several parks, and runs through the eastern part of Regina — Saskatchewan's capital city — as Ring Road. Formerly, the highway ran through the centre of Rigina following Albert Street.

=== Canada–United States border to Highway 39 ===
Highway 6 begins at the Canada–United States border crossing of Raymond–Regway and heads north towards the east–west running Highway 18 and the Big Muddy Badlands. Highway 6 begins a 9.7-kilometre (6.0 mi) long concurrency with Highway 18 that runs past West Coteau Lake, skirting the eastern edge of the badlands. Just south of Minton, the concurrency ends with 18 turning east and 6 continuing north. Highway 6 then travels north out of the hills of the Missouri Coteau en route to Ceylon and Highway 377. Just east on 377 is the Ceylon Regional Park. For the next 63 kilometres (39 mi), Highway 6 heads north towards its intersection with Highway 39 near Corinne. There are no communities along this stretch of highway. It does, however, intersect three highways (13, 712, and 710) and cross the Moose Jaw River.

=== CanAm Highway section ===
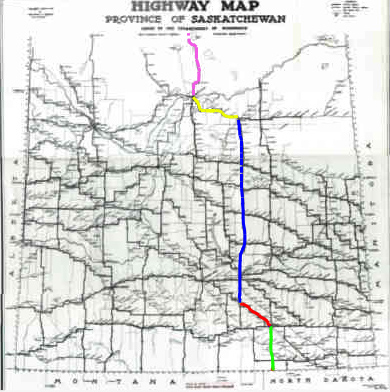
CanAm Highway Legend through Saskatchewan: Sk 35 — green Sk 39 — red Sk 6 — blue Sk 3 — yellow Sk 2 — pink

Highway 6 is part of the CanAm Highway system from Highway 39 near Corinne north to Highway 3 at the city of Melfort.

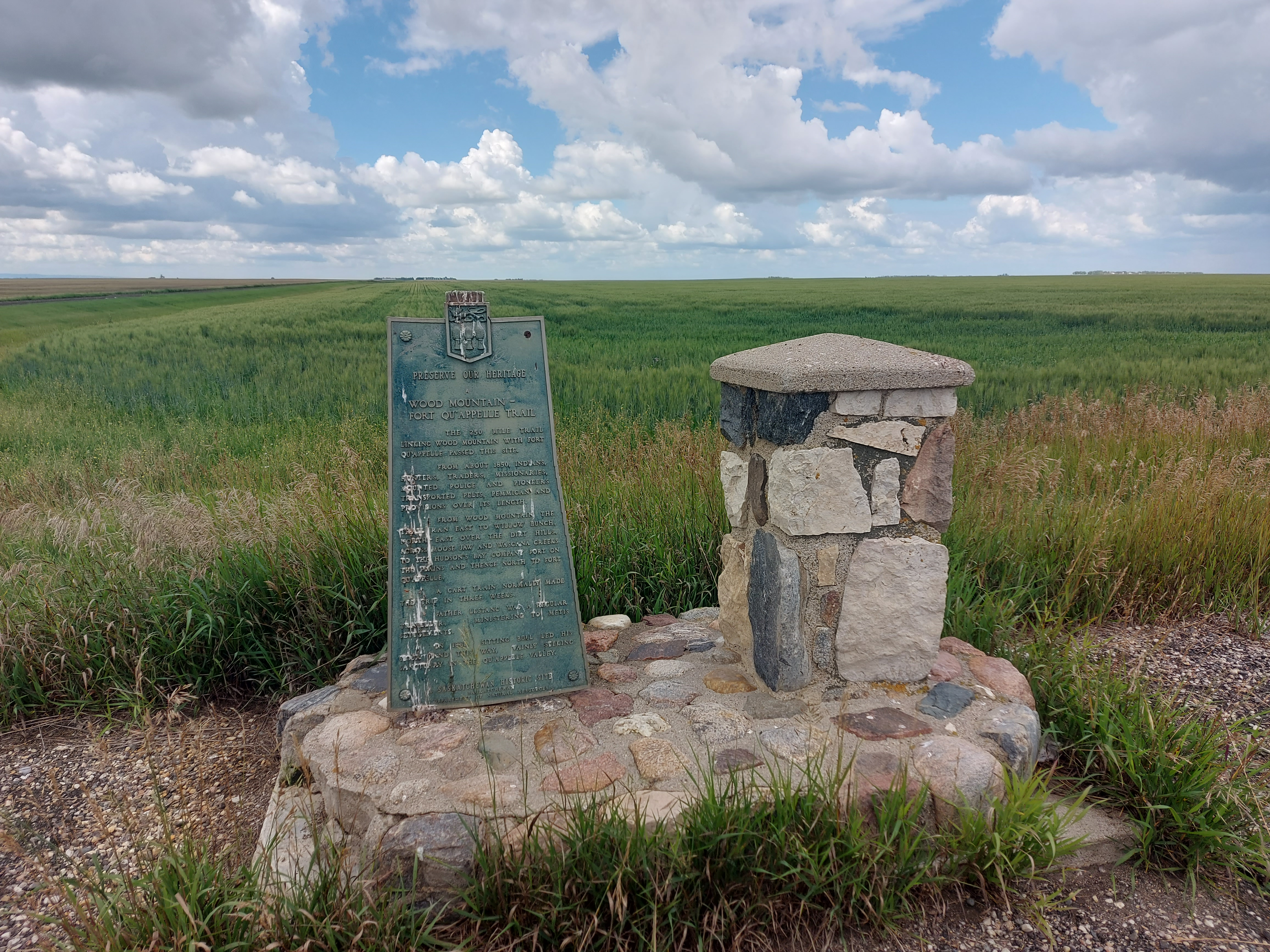
Plaque along Highway 6 commemorating the Wood Mountain – Fort Qu'Appelle Trail

At the intersection of Highways 39 and 6, the two highways begin a 3.7-kilometre (2.3 mi) long north-westbound concurrency that ends at just north of Corinne and Highway 377. Highway 39 continues to the north-west en route to Moose Jaw while 6 travels north to Regina. A two-year, $57 million twinning project at that concurrency and at a section of Highway 6 south of Regina was completed in 2025. The project involved the twinning of a 7.1-kilometre (4.4 mi) long segment of highway beginning along Highway 39 south-east of the Highway 6 intersection to a point north of Corinne. The other segment involved the twinning of 7.8 kilometres (4.8 mi) of Highway 6 from Highway 306 north to the Regina Bypass. Besides Highway 306, Highway 6 also intersects Highway 714 between Corinne and the bypass. Almost 10 kilometres (6.2 mi) north of Corinne is the historic Wood Mountain – Fort Qu'Appelle Trail marker. Just south of Highway 6's intersection with the bypass is the community of Rowatt. The Regina Bypass, which connects with Highway 6 via a partial cloverleaf interchange, carries Highway 1, the Trans-Canada Highway, around the southern and eastern parts of the city. The Regina Bypass, which opened in 2019, is a $1.8 billion project that included 12 overpasses and 40 kilometres (25 mi) of four-lane highway that encircles most of Regina. The western flank of the bypass is part of Highway 11.

From the interchange with the bypass, Highway 6 continues north as a divided highway to meet Regina's Ring Road in a cloverleaf interchange. Built in 1967, it was Saskatchewan's second cloverleaf interchange. Highway 6 departs its northerly routing and follows the Ring Road around the eastern side of Regina. Formerly, Highway 6 had continued straight north through Regina as Albert Street. Ring Road, which until the completion of the Regina Bypass, had carried Highway 1 around Regina to the Victoria Avenue exit. Now it carries Highway 6 for most of its length. Intersections running clock-wise from where Highway 6 joins the Ring Road include Wascana Parkway, Assiniboine Avenue, Arcola Avenue (Highway 33), Victoria Avenue, Dewdney Avenue, Ross Avenue, McDonald Street (Highway 46), and Winnipeg Street. Highway 6 exits the Ring Road at Albert Street North and continues north out of the city. Less than a kilometre from Ring Road, the former southern terminus of Highway 11 intersects Highway 6. With the completion of the Regina Bypass, Highway 11 now stays to the west of Regina and this original routing is now designated as 'Highway 11A'.

Continuing north from Regina and the Highway 11A intersection, Highway 6 heads towards the Qu'Appelle Valley. The Qu'Appelle Valley is a glacier-carved valley that stretches over half the width of the province, beginning at Lake Diefenbaker and running east to the Assiniboine River in Manitoba. En route to the valley, the highway crosses Boggy Creek and intersects Highways 734 and 729. At the crest of the valley, Highway 6 provides access to Fairy Hill Trails. As the highway descends into the valley, it curves to the north-east. On the valley floor, Highway 6 crosses the Qu'Appelle River and meets the eastern terminus of Highway 99. After the intersection with Highway 99, Highway 6 follows the river for about a kilometre to the community of Fairy Hill before ascending out of the valley. The highway continues its north-eastly heading for about another 5 kilometres (3.1 mi) before turning back north. It continues north for another 8.1 kilometres (5.0 mi) where it intersects Highway 22 on the southside of the town of Southey. Highway 6 then passes through Southey as it continues northward. About 14 kilometres (8.7 mi) north of Southey, Highway 6 begins a 9.1-kilometre (5.7 mi) long concurrency with Highway 731. When the concurrency ends, Highway 731 turns east while 6 veers to the north-west. Just shy of 2 kilometres (1.2 mi) later, Highway 6 resumes its northerly routing passing through Serath. North of Serath, Highway 6 once again jogs to the north-west for a short distance before turning north again. It continues north for a further 14 kilometres (8.7 mi) where it meets and begins a 2.6-kilometre (1.6 mi) long northbound concurrency with Highway 15. The concurrency ends at the town of Raymore with 15 turning west and 6 continuing north. Highway 6 maintains a northerly routing en route to Dafoe where it begins 5.2-kilometre (3.2 mi) long concurrency with Highway 16, the Yellowhead Highway. Highway 6 then runs along the western shore of the Quill Lakes. For about 11 years an excavator visible from the highway was stuck in the Quill Lakes. It had become a local landmark until it was finally removed in 2025. Continuing north from the Quill Lakes, Highway 6 provides access to Lampard and intersects Highway 761 as it approaches Highway 5 and the town of Watson. On the southside of town, along Highway 6, is McNab Regional Park. Highway 5 and 6 have a very short concurrency (270 metres (890 ft)) that runs along the western side of Watson. Travelling north from Watson, Highway 6 provides access to Daphne and has a one-mile long concurrency with Highway 756 at Spalding. nine point six kilometres (6.0 mi) farther north, Highway 6 intersects Highways 349 and 777 at the town of Naicam. This area is sustained by agriculture, with the ecosystem changing from the rolling parkland to boreal forest. The Barrier River Valley, Kipabiskau Regional Park, and Lake Charron Regional Park are nearby features.

The final leg of the CanAm section of Highway 6 runs from Naicam north to Melfort. Communities accessed along this segment include Pleasantdale, Silver Park, and Resource. It also crosses Melfort Creek and shares a concurrency with Highway 776. South of Melfort, the eastern terminus of Highway 41 meets Highway 6. Highway 3 also meets Highway 6 at the eastern terminus of Highway 41. From that intersection, the two highways run concurrently north as Saskatchewan Drive South into Melfort. After the highway passes Melfort Golf Course and crosses a set of railway tracks, it turns to the north-west, following the tracks and running through the southern end of town as Saskatchewan Drive East. Once past Main Street, Saskatchewan Drive East becomes Saskatchewan Drive West. A short distance later, Highway 6 turns north and follows Broadway Avenue while Highway 3 and the CanAm designation continue to the north-west.

=== Melfort to the northern terminus ===
Highway 6 heads north out of Melfort. About 20 kilometres (12 mi) north of town, the highway crosses the Carrot River, a major tributary of the Saskatchewan River. After crossing the Carrot River, Highway 6 bends to the east and travels for almost 10 kilometres (6.2 mi) before turning north-east just past the Fairy Glen access road (Baillie Road). It continues to the north-east until Gronlid and Highway 335. From Gronlid, Highway 6 heads north towards the Saskatchewan River. It descends into the valley and crosses the river via the George Willis Bridge. The South Saskatchewan and North Saskatchewan Rivers join west of the highway. Highway 6 passes through Wapiti Valley Regional Park, which straddles the Saskatchewan River. The park has a ski resort on the southside of the valley and a campground on the north. Climbing out of the valley, Highway 6 travels a further 27 kilometres (17 mi) through the eastern part of the Fort à la Corne Provincial Forest north to its northern terminus at Highway 55 (the Northern Woods and Water Route). Choiceland is 1.6 kilometres (1 mi) north of the terminus and is accessed from Highway 692, which continues north from the terminus of Highway 6.

== Highway history, upgrades, and improvements ==
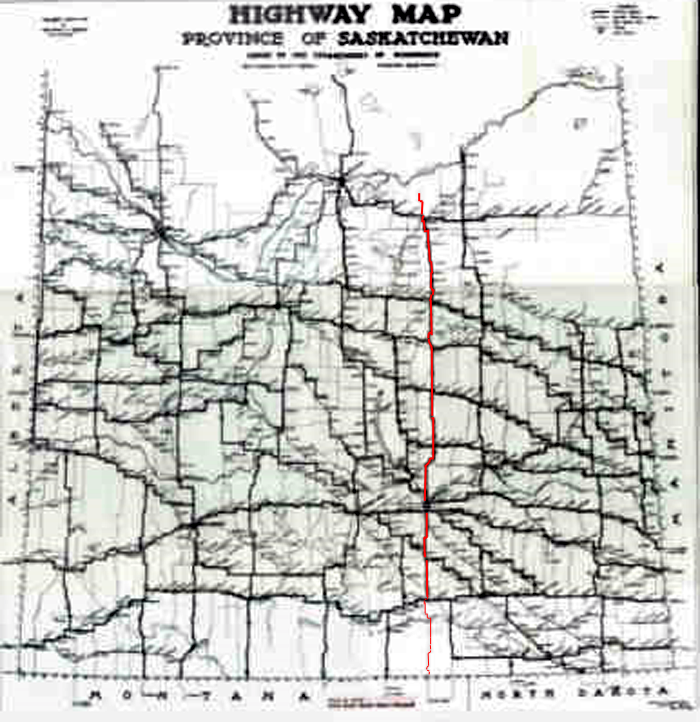
Sk Hwy 6 map in 1926 before it was straightened

- In 1999 the asphalt concrete pavement section of Highway 6 north of Raymore was tested with a Cold in-place recycling or "CIR" method to rehabilitate highways. This CIR process is a cost-effective method which recycles the top surface of a road. This pulverized material is mixed with asphalt emulsion and spread and compacted back onto the highway surface. This surface is then recovered with a new seal dependent on traffic volume.
- In 2004, 16.3 km (10.1 mi) was paved from the Port of Regway at U.S. border north at a cost of $2.7 million.
- In 2001, beginning about 16 km (9.9 mi) north of Regina, 18.5 km (11.5 mi) of Highway 6 was repaved north into the Qu'Appelle Valley until about half a kilometre south of the junction with Highway 99. The $2.5 million project consisted of milling off the old rough surface followed by repaving with new asphalt.

== Major intersections ==
From south to north:

Rural municipality	Location	km	mi	Destinations	Notes
Surprise Valley No. 9	Regway	0.0	0.0	MT 16 south (Theodore Roosevelt Expressway) – Plentywood	Continuation into Montana
Surprise Valley No. 9	Regway	0.0	0.0	Canada–United States border at Raymond–Regway Border Crossing	
Surprise Valley No. 9		6.7	4.2	Highway 18 west – Coronach	South end of Highway 18 concurrency
Surprise Valley No. 9		16.4	10.2	Highway 18 east – Estevan	North end of Highway 18 concurrency
Surprise Valley No. 9	Minton	18.6	11.6		
The Gap No. 39		42.8	26.6	Highway 705 east – Colgate	South end of Highway 705 concurrency
The Gap No. 39		49.0	30.4	Highway 705 west – Bengough	North end of Highway 705 concurrency
The Gap No. 39	Ceylon	52.3	32.5	Highway 377 east – Radville	
Norton No. 69		72.3	44.9	Highway 13 (Red Coat Trail) – Assiniboia, Weyburn	East of Pangman
Caledonia No. 99		93.6	58.2	Highway 712 west – Parry	
Caledonia No. 99		110.7	68.8	Highway 710 east – Milestone	
Caledonia No. 99		115.0	71.5	Highway 39 east / CanAm Highway – Weyburn	CanAm Highway south end; south end of Highway 39 concurrency
Bratt's Lake No. 129	Corinne	117.9	73.3	Highway 334 west – Avonlea	
Bratt's Lake No. 129		118.7	73.8	Highway 39 west – Moose Jaw	North end of Highway 39 concurrency
Bratt's Lake No. 129		134.1	83.3	Highway 714 west – Rouleau	
Bratt's Lake No. 129		140.6	87.4	Highway 306 east – Gray, Riceton	
Sherwood No. 159		151.9	94.4	Highway 1 (TCH) (Regina Bypass) – Moose Jaw, Winnipeg	Interchange; Highway 1 exit 247
City of Regina		156.7	97.4	Ring Road to Highway 1 / Highway 6 north / Highway 11 north – Moose Jaw, Winnipeg, Airport	Interchange; Highway 6 north is signed to follow Ring Road but officially follows Albert Street (unsigned)
City of Regina		161.1	100.1	Albert Memorial Bridge crosses Wascana Creek	
City of Regina		162.3	100.8	Victoria Avenue to Highway 1 east	
City of Regina		166.7	103.6	Ring Road to Highway 1 / Highway 6 south – Airport	Interchange; Highway 6 south is signed to follow Ring Road but officially follows Albert Street (unsigned)
City of Regina		168.2	104.5	Highway 11A north (Louis Riel Trail) to Highway 11 – Lumsden, Saskatoon	Interchange; northbound exit and southbound entrance
Sherwood No. 159	No major junctions				
Lumsden No. 189		176.2	109.5	Highway 734 – Lumsden, Zehner	
Lumsden No. 189		189.1	117.5	Highway 729 – Craven, Edenwold	
Lumsden No. 189		195.6	121.5	Highway 624 south – Zehner, Pilot Butte	
Longlaketon No. 219	Fairy Hill	203.2	126.3	Highway 99 west – Craven	
Cupar No. 218	Southey	219.7	136.5	Highway 22 – Earl Grey, Cupar, Fort Qu'Appelle	
Cupar No. 218		234.3	145.6	Highway 731 west – Strasbourg	
Touchwood No. 248		244.2	151.7	Highway 731 east – Ituna	
Mount Hope No. 279		271.3	168.6	Highway 15 east – Ituna, Melville	South end of Highway 15 concurrency
Mount Hope No. 279	Raymore	273.9	170.2	Highway 15 west – Serath, Nokomis	North end of Highway 15 concurrency
Mount Hope No. 279		284.3	176.7	Highway 744 west – Nokomis	
Big Quill No. 308		297.3	184.7	Highway 743 east – Wishart	
Big Quill No. 308	Dafoe	311.8	193.7	Highway 16 (TCH/YH) east – Yorkton	South end of Highway 16 concurrency
Prairie Rose No. 309		317.0	197.0	Highway 16 (TCH/YH) west – Lanigan, Saskatoon	North end of Highway 16 concurrency
Lakeside No. 338		339.8	211.1	Leroy access road	
Lakeside No. 338	Watson	354.9	220.5	Highway 5 east – Wadena	South end of Highway 5 concurrency
Lakeside No. 338	Watson	355.2	220.7	Highway 5 west – Humboldt, Saskatoon	North end of Highway 5 concurrency
Spalding No. 368		376.4	233.9	Highway 756 west – Annaheim, Marysburg	South end of Highway 756 concurrency
Spalding No. 368		378.0	234.9	Highway 756 east – Rose Valley	North end of Highway 756 concurrency
Pleasantdale No. 398	Naicam	387.7	240.9	Highway 349 east – Archerwill Highway 777 west – Lake Lenore	
Pleasantdale No. 398		394.4	245.1	Lac Vert access road	
Pleasantdale No. 398	Pleasantdale	406.2	252.4	Highway 773 – St. Brieux, McKague	
Star City No. 428		422.8	262.7	Highway 776 east – Resource	South end of Highway 776 concurrency
Star City No. 428		431.5	268.1	Highway 776 west	North end of Highway 776 concurrency
City of Melfort		438.0	272.2	Highway 3 east – Tisdale Highway 41 west – Wakaw, Saskatoon Highway 41A begins	South end of Highway 3 / Highway 41A concurrency
City of Melfort		441.2	274.1	CanAm Highway / Highway 3 west / Highway 41A west (Saskatchewan Drive) / Broadway Avenue – Prince Albert	Highway 6 follows Broadway Avenue; CanAm Highway north end; north end of Highway 3 / Highway 41A concurrency
Kinistino No. 459		458.6	285.0	Highway 778 west – Kinistino	
Willow Creek No. 458		466.5	289.9	Fairy Glen access road	
Willow Creek No. 458		473.1	294.0	Highway 789 west (Coxby Road)	South end of Highway 789 concurrency
Willow Creek No. 458	Gronlid	474.9	295.1	Highway 335 east – Arborfield	
Nipawin No. 487		487.7	303.0	Highway 789 east – Codette	North end of Highway 789 concurrency
Nipawin No. 487		490.5	304.8	Melfort Bridge across the Saskatchewan River	
Torch River No. 488		508.4	315.9	Highway 790 east (Cherry Ridge Road)	
Torch River No. 488	Choiceland	518.1	321.9	Highway 55 (NWWR) – Prince Albert, Nipawin Highway 692 north	
1.000 mi = 1.609 km; 1.000 km = 0.621 mi: Concurrency terminus; Incomplete access

== See also ==
- Transportation in Saskatchewan
- Roads in Saskatchewan

Preceded by Highway 3	CanAm Highway; Hwy 6	Succeeded by Highway 39
