= Saskatchewan Highway 641 =

Highway Saskatchewan, Canada

Highway 641

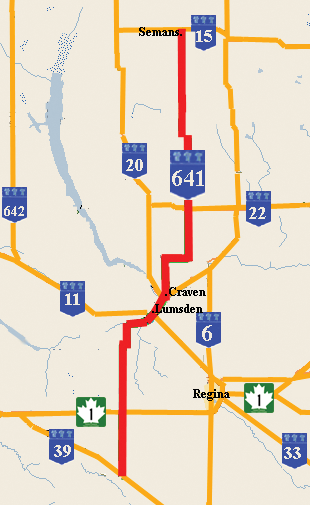

Route information
- Maintained by Ministry of Highways and Infrastructure & Transport Canada
- Length: 131.2 km (81.5 mi)

Major junctions
- South end: Highway 1 (TCH) / Highway 623 near Pense
- Highway 11 in Lumsden Highway 20 between Lumsden and Craven; Highway 99 in Craven Highway 22 in Earl Grey
- North end: Highway 15 at Semans

Location
- Country: Canada
- Province: Saskatchewan
- Rural municipalities: Pense No. 160, Lumsden No. 189, Longlaketon No. 219, Mount Hope No. 279

Highway system
- Provincial highways in Saskatchewan
← Highway 640	→ Highway 642

Highway 641 is a 600-series municipal highway in the Canadian province of Saskatchewan. It runs from the intersection between Trans-Canada Highway (Hwy 1) and Highway 623 near Pense north to Highway 15 at Semans. It is about 131.2 kilometres (81.5 mi) long. The highway intersects both Highway 11 (Louis Riel Trail) and Highway 20 at Lumsden, as well as Highway 22 at Earl Grey.

Local Improvement Districts were the precursors of rural municipalities which initially established and maintained roads in their area. Early settlers helped to construct and maintain the route and would get paid road improvement wages from the local rural municipality. The 8 kilometres (5.0 mi) concurrency between Highway 20 and Highway 641 was constructed in 1927 following the removal of the Canadian National Railway line between Lumsden and Craven. The remainder of the road followed Dominion land survey township and range lines.

== Route description ==
Highway 641 begins near Pense at the intersection between the Trans-Canada Highway and Hwy 623. This area is part of the Regina Plain landscape area of the Moist Mixed Grassland ecoregion featuring mainly cereal crops in the dark brown soils. After passing through Pense, it intersects Highway 730. Highway 730 connects to Regina east of this intersection. Lumsden is located at the intersection with Highway 11 in the Qu'Appelle Valley.

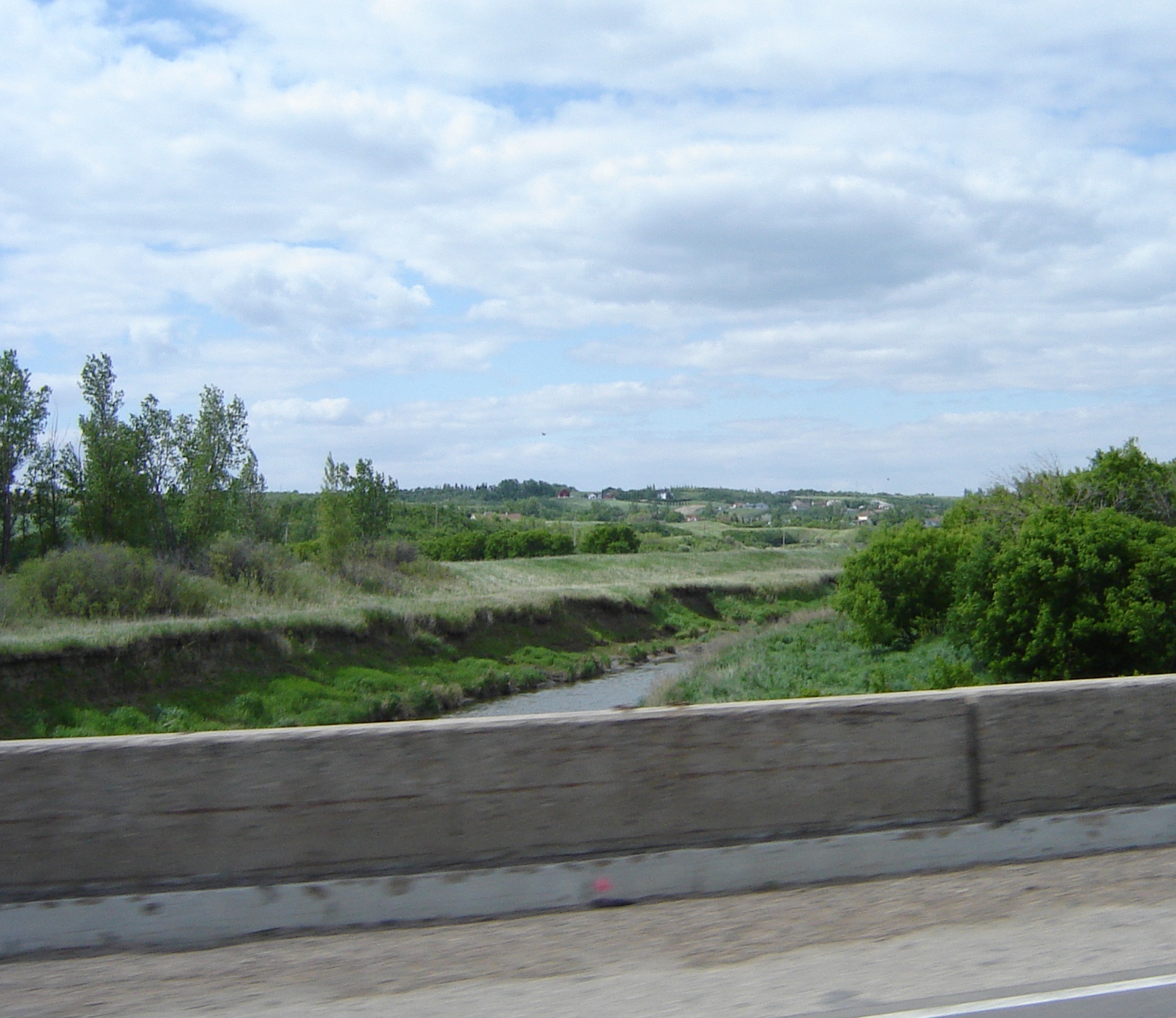
Qu'Appelle River in Lumsden

The town of Lumsden features the Lumsden Museum which is home to several restored heritage buildings. The Lumsden Trans Canada Trail Committee helped establish 20 kilometres (12 mi) of the Trans Canada Trail. The trail has been groomed for walking, hiking, cycling, skiing, horseback riding, canoeing, and snowmobiling. Craven, the home of the Craven Country Jamboree, is located at the Highway 99 and Highway 20 junctions. Highway 641 continues north for 11.5 kilometres (7.1 mi) and then turns east 6.4 kilometres (4.0 mi) before again continuing northerly. This final stretch of the highway is part of the Strasbourg Plain landscape area of the Moist Mixed Grassland ecoregion featuring small trembling aspen bluffs around the occasional slough. Earl Grey is located at the intersection with Highway 22. There are no localities located at the intersection with the secondary Highway 731. Last Mountain House Provincial Park protects the heritage site of the Hudson's Bay Company post Last Mountain House established in 1869. The terminus of Highway 641 is at the Highway 15 intersection at Semans.

== History ==
Between 1897 and 1909, municipal administration affairs were handled by Local Improvement District (LID) Number 165. The LID changed its boundaries on 13 December 1909, and on 1 January 1913, the LID was renamed Pense No. 160. During the 1940s work was undertaken on paving roadways, a man could earn 35 cents an hour or $6.90 today a man and two horses could be employed at a rate of 65 cents an hour $12.81 today, a horse drawn drag would earn 37.5 cents an hour $7.39 today, and if a farmer owned a tractor, a tractor drawn drag could earn as much as 50 cents per hour $9.85 today.

The Saskatchewan Highway Act was established in 1922, in compliance with the 1919 Canadian Highway Act. At the initial stages of the Saskatchewan Highway Act, 16 kilometres (9.9 mi) of provincial highways were gravel and the rest were earth roads. The road allowances were laid out as a part of the Dominion Land Survey system for homesteading. Travel along the Provincial Highway 641 before the 1940s would have been travelling on the "square" following the township road allowances, barbed wire fencing and the Canadian Northern rail line. As the surveyed township roads were the easiest to travel, the first highway was designed on 90-degree, right-angle corners as the distance traversed the prairie along range roads and township roads.

There is a historical monument erected along the highway which states that the early railway was established along the east side of the Last Mountain Lake (Long Lake) in 1907, and constructed on the west side in 1911. The monument documents as well the Lady of the Lake sternwheeler which was used on Long Lake. Local historians clarify that the rail came to the east of the Lake in 1911, and to the west in 1912. The Lady of the Lake began as a sternwheeler, but was modified to a screw propeller. Also on the Lake the S.S. Qu'Appelle, a luxurious steamer, towed a barge across the lake.

Lumsden was initially served by the Canadian National Railway (CNR), however the Canadian Pacific Railway (CPR) was built through Craven in 1910. The new line brought freight to Lumsden infrequently and the elevator was torn down in 1927, and the CNR track removed the next year. The highway went through where the CNR bridge had been built. Highway 20 is marked on an early 1926 and 1955 maps, but highway 641 is unmarked — showing up as surveyed township and range roads only.

== Major intersections ==
Rural municipality	Location	km	mi	Destinations	Notes
Pense No. 160		0.0	0.0	Highway 1 (TCH) – Regina, Moose Jaw Highway 623 south – Rouleau	Southern terminus; northern terminus of Hwy 623; road continues south as southbound Hwy 623; southern end of paved section
Pense No. 160	Pense	2.4	1.5	Northern end of paved section at Assiniboia Street	
Pense No. 160		2.5	1.6	Highway 730 – Stony Beach, Keystown, Grand Coulee, Regina	
Lumsden No. 189		28.6	17.8	Range Road 2221 to Highway 54 – Regina Beach	
Lumsden No. 189		30.2	18.8	Bridge over Wascana Creek; southern end of paved section	
Lumsden No. 189	Lumsden	32.4	20.1	Highway 734 east (Qu'Appelle Drive E) – Brora	Western terminus of Hwy 734; Hwy 641 makes a left onto James Street N
Lumsden No. 189	Lumsden	33.2	20.6	Bridge over the Qu'Appelle River	
Lumsden No. 189	Lumsden	33.5	20.8	James Street N / 8th Avenue	Hwy 641 makes a right onto 8th Avenue
Lumsden No. 189	Lumsden	33.8	21.0	Highway 11 (Louis Riel Trail) – Saskatoon, Regina Highway 20 begins	Interchange; southern terminus of Hwy 20; southern end of Hwy 20 concurrency
Lumsden No. 189		42.2	26.2	Bridge over Last Mountain Creek Canal	
Lumsden No. 189		42.9	26.7	Highway 729 east (Russell Hill Road)	Western terminus of Hwy 729
Longlaketon No. 219	Craven	43.4	27.0	Bridge over Last Mountain Creek	
Longlaketon No. 219	Craven	43.5	27.0	Highway 20 north – Bulyea	North end of Hwy 20 concurrency
Longlaketon No. 219	Craven	43.6	27.1	Highway 99 (Tennant Street) – Fairy Hill, Southey	
Longlaketon No. 219	Craven	43.7	27.2	Northern end of paved section where Hwy 641 makes a right from Fraser Avenue onto Grid Road 641	
Longlaketon No. 219	Earl Grey	76.2	47.3	Highway 22 – Bulyea, Southey	
Longlaketon No. 219		90.7	56.4	Highway 731 to Highway 6 / CanAm Highway – Strasbourg	
Mount Hope No. 279	Semans	129.6	80.5	Southern end of paved section at railway crossing	
Mount Hope No. 279	Semans	131.2	81.5	Highway 15 – Nokomis, Raymore	Northern terminus; northern end of paved section; road continues north as Cardigan Road
1.000 mi = 1.609 km; 1.000 km = 0.621 mi: Concurrency terminus

== See also ==
- Roads in Saskatchewan
- Transportation in Saskatchewan
