= Wascana (disambiguation) =

Wascana may refer to:

- Wascana Centre, a park in Regina, Saskatchewan
- Wascana Creek, a creek in Regina, Saskatchewan
- Wascana Review, a biannual literary magazine
- Wascana Trail, a series of interconnected hiking and mountain biking trails
- Regina—Wascana, a federal electoral district
- Regina Wascana, a former provincial electoral district
- Regina Wascana Plains, a provincial electoral district

== See also ==
- Saskatchewan Oil & Gas Corporation, previously Wascana Energy
