= Kandahar, Saskatchewan =

Community in Saskatchewan, Canada

Kandahar Candahar Post Office
- Special service area
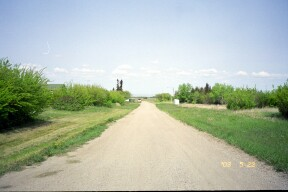
- The road into Kandahar in May 2003

- Location within Saskatchewan Kandahar (Canada)
- Coordinates: 51.7581°N 104.3619°W
- Country: Canada
- Province: Saskatchewan
- Rural Municipality: Big Quill No. 308
- Federal electoral district: Regina—Qu'Appelle
- Provincial electoral district: Kelvington-Wadena
- Special service area: January 1, 2025
- Founder: Canadian Pacific Railway
- Named for: Kandahar

Government
  - Member of the Legislative Assembly: Chris Beaudry
  - Member of Parliament: Andrew Scheer
- Time zone: UTC−6 (Central Standard Time)

Kandahar is a special service area in Rural Municipality of Big Quill No. 308, Saskatchewan, Canada. Listed as a designated place by Statistics Canada, the community had a population of 20 in the Canada 2016 Census. Located on Highway 16 near Wynyard, the community was named by Canadian Pacific Railway executives in the 1909 for a British military victory by General Roberts in Kandahar, Afghanistan. Kandahar is too small to be enumerated on its own, so its population belongs to the RM of Big Quill No. 308. It is located near the southern shore of Big Quill Lake, the largest inland body of salt water in Canada.

== History ==
Many of the first settlers in the Kandahar district were immigrants from Norway and Iceland or of Icelandic descent. A significant number arrived from the Argyle settlement in Manitoba. This first settlers arrived from Norway in 1904 including Odin Granhaus, Henry Skjerven, Bert Lorenson, Amund Hagen, and Gilbert Sather. In 1909 the CPR exteneded the rail line from Sheho. An Icelandic immigrant, Thorvidur Halldorson (born Þorviður Magnússon), served as the district's first postmaster in 1910. From 1910 to 1913, the spelling of the post office was Candahar. Kandahar became a village in 1913, following a petition from its inhabitants. In 1925, Kandahar was listed as a Canadian Pacific Railway Ltd. Station on the Minnedosa, Saskatoon, Edmonton Section, CPR. Businesses included a printing press, Prentsmiðja A. Helgasonar, run by Andres Helgason (1867-1939), who was a skilled bookbinder and printer.

The one room school house was named Kandahar School District #3333.

Until the 1970s, Kandahar was a thriving community with various stores and attractions, including a popular steak house. However, in the late 1980s the community's only school closed, and the population has steadily decreased since.

The community was profiled in Aisha Jamal's 2019 documentary film A Kandahar Away.

Kandahar's status was changed from organized hamlet to special service area on January 1, 2025.

== Demographics ==
In the 2021 Census of Population conducted by Statistics Canada, Kandahar had a population of 10 living in 6 of its 8 total private dwellings, a change of −50% from its 2016 population of 20. With a land area of 0.46 km^{2} (0.18 sq mi), it had a population density of 21.7/km^{2} (56.3/sq mi) in 2021.

Canada census – Kandahar, Saskatchewan community profile

	2016
Population	20 (0.0% from 2011)
Land area	0.36 km^{2} (0.14 sq mi)
Population density	55.6/km^{2} (144/sq mi)
Median age
Private dwellings	12 (total)
Median household income	$N/A

References: 2016

== See also ==
- List of communities in Saskatchewan
