= Last Mountain Creek =

River in Saskatchewan, Canada

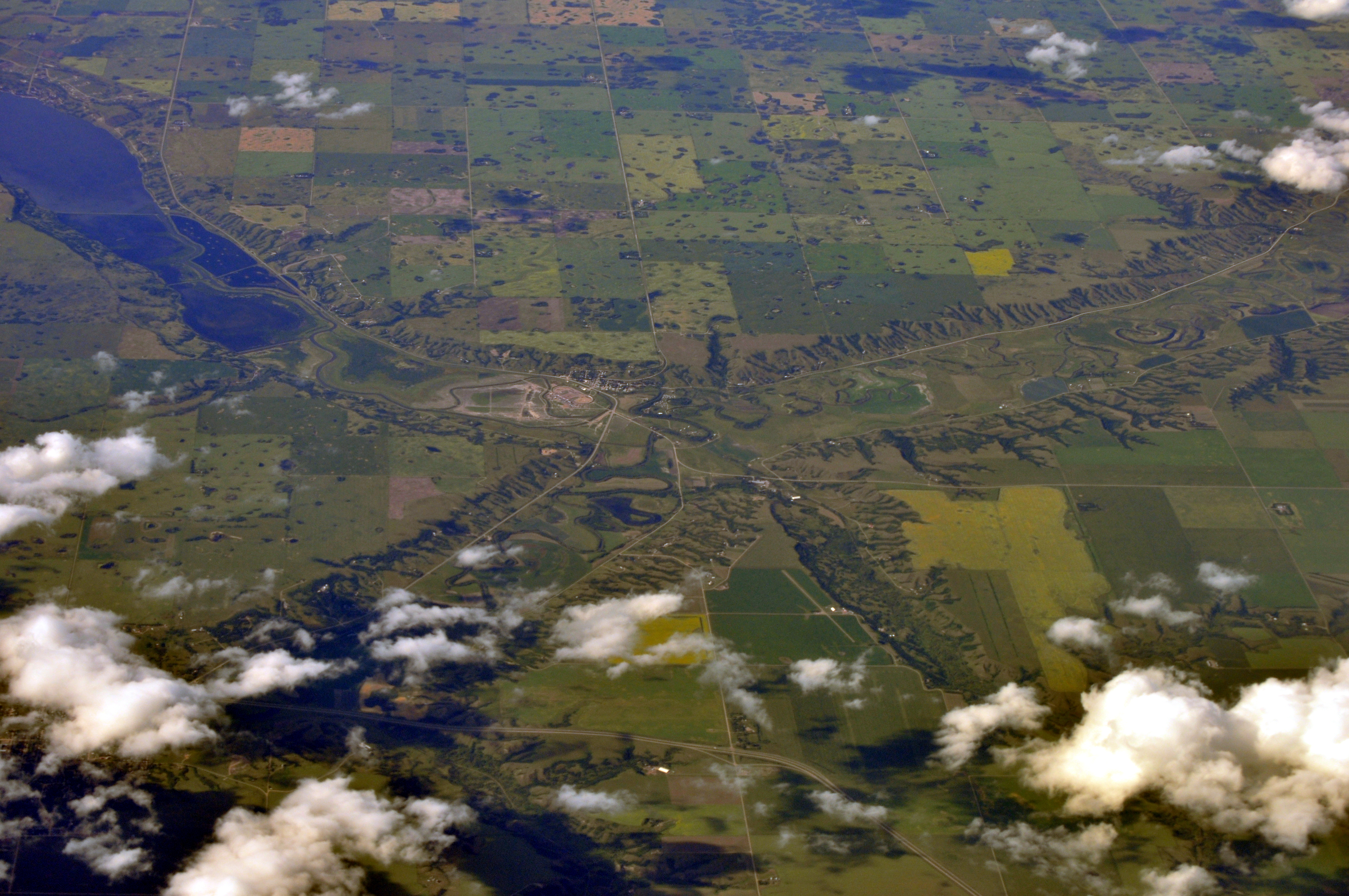
- Confluence of Last Mountain Creek, Qu'Appelle River, and Wascana Creek

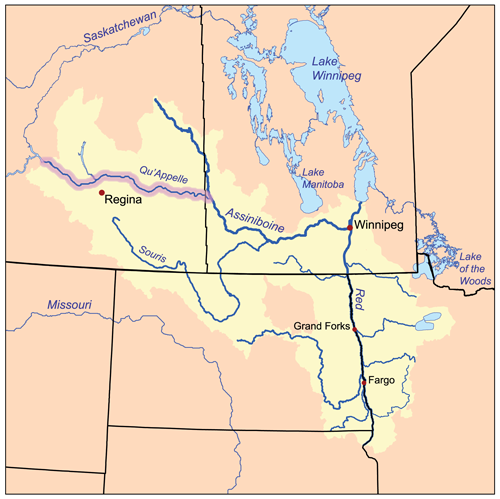
- The Red River drainage basin, with the Qu'Appelle River highlighted

- Location in Saskatchewan Last Mountain Creek (Canada)

Location
- Country: Canada
- Province: Saskatchewan

Physical characteristics
- Source: Last Mountain Lake
  - coordinates: 50.7432°N 104.8677°W
  - elevation: 490 m (1,610 ft)
- Mouth: Qu'Appelle River
  - location: Craven
  - coordinates: 50°42′24″N 104°49′32″W
- Length: 6 km (3.7 mi)

Basin features
- River system: Red River

Last Mountain Creek is a river in south-central Saskatchewan. It is a tributary of the Qu'Appelle River in a region called the Prairie Pothole Region of North America, which extends throughout three Canadian provinces and five U.S. states. It is also within Palliser's Triangle and the Great Plains ecoregion.

The river is part of the Upper Qu'Appelle River watershed and starts at the southern end of Last Mountain Lake. It travels in a southerly direction for about 6 kilometres (3.7 mi) until it meets the Qu'Appelle River in the Qu'Appelle Valley, which was formed during the last ice age. During years in which the Qu'Appelle River is high, Last Mountain Creek naturally reverses direction and flows into Last Mountain Lake. Craven Dam is located east of Last Mountain Creek's mouth on the Qu'Appelle River on the eastern side of the village of Craven. The gates of the dam are used to regulate water flows along the Qu'Appelle and can be closed to backflood water up Last Mountain Creek and into Last Mountain Lake.

== Description ==
At the southernmost point of Last Mountain Lake, there is the Valeport Dam (50.7292°N 104.8601°W) and associated dykes that help control the lake's water levels. The dam was built in 1939, upgraded in 1958, and is 3.7 metres (12 ft) high. It is owned and operated by the Saskatchewan Water Security Agency. Last Mountain Creek flows out of the lake at the dam and runs through Valeport Marsh following Highway 20 until it meets the Qu'Appelle River at the village of Craven and Highways 641 and 729. Wascana Creek meets the Qu'Appelle River just west and upstream from the mouth of Last Mountain Creek.

=== Tributaries ===
Other than Last Mountain Lake and Valeport Marsh, no named tributaries flow into Last Mountain Creek. Several tributaries flow into Last Mountain Lake, though, including Arm River, Lewis Creek, and Lanigan Creek.

== Valeport Marsh ==
Valeport Marsh (50.7231°N 104.8491°W) is an extensive floodplain on the south-east corner of Last Mountain Lake at the point where Last Mountain Creek starts. The wetland is over 30 square kilometres (12 sq mi) in size and follows the course of the river towards Craven and the Qu'Appelle River for about 6 kilometres (3.7 mi). A 900-acre conservation project called Valeport Wildlife Management Area Trails protects the wetlands for migratory birds, ducks, grebes, and other wildlife. It was created by the provincial government with the assistance of Ducks Unlimited Canada and is an Important Bird Area of Canada called Valeport Marsh (SK 061). At the head of the river and edge of the marsh, along Last Mountain Lake's south-eastern shore, is the 57-hectare (140-acre) Valeport Provincial Recreation Site (50.7478°N 104.8709°W). The park offers canoeing, picnicking, hiking, and walking along the top of the dyke.

Along the west side of the Valeport Wildlife Management Area is a Nature Conservancy of Canada property called Big Valley (50°44′20″N 104°53′19″W). Big Valley is 552 acres of protected grassland and is managed for bird and wildlife habitat. Valeport Marsh Wildlife Management Area is at the southern tip of Last Mountain Lake and Last Mountain Lake National Wildlife Area is at the northern end.

== See also ==
- List of rivers of Saskatchewan
- List of protected areas of Saskatchewan
- List of dams and reservoirs in Canada
