= Wynyard railway station =

Wynyard railway station may refer to:

- Wynyard railway station (England), a former station in County Durham, England
- Wynyard railway station (Saskatchewan), a former station in Wynyard, Saskatchewan, Canada
- Wynyard railway station, Sydney, New South Wales, Australia
