= Shooting at the 2007 Canada Games =

Shooting was an event at the 2007 Canada Games held at Vanier Catholic Secondary School in Whitehorse, Yukon.

== Team Air Pistol ==
Medal	Men's	Points	Women's	Points
Gold	Quebec	1,111	British Columbia	715
Silver	Saskatchewan	1,098	Ontario	696
Bronze	Ontario	1,063	Alberta	695

== Individual Air Pistol ==
Medal	Men's	Points	Women's	Points
Gold	(Saskatchewan) Matthew James Hendry	652.9	(British Columbia) Catherine Thwaites	459.6
Silver	(British Columbia) Tyler Bryce Johnson	650.6	(British Columbia) Silvia Lydia Incrocci	451.5
Bronze	(Saskatchewan) Samuel Pidwerbeski	638.9	(Saskatchewan) Christine Elizabeth King	447.1

== Team Air Rifle ==
Medal	Men's	Points	Women's	Points
Gold	British Columbia	1,130	Saskatchewan Nikki Bergeron, Cassandra Wilson-Anderson	752
Silver	Saskatchewan Matthew McDermott, Justin Nenson	1,126	Ontario	752
Bronze	Ontario	1,114	British Columbia	750

== Individual Air Rifle ==
Medal	Men's	Points	Women's	Points
Gold	(Saskatchewan) Matthew William McDermott	672.5	(British Columbia) Rauchelle Nicole Johnson	490.1
Silver	(Saskatchewan) Justin David Nenson	669.3	(British Columbia) Kaitlyn Sasanne Harvey	481.0
Bronze	(Ontario) Michael Wade Goodchild	667.4	(Manitoba) Connor Elizabeth Deneka	480.6
