= Pense, Saskatchewan =

Town in Saskatchewan, Canada

Pense
- Town
- Town of Pense
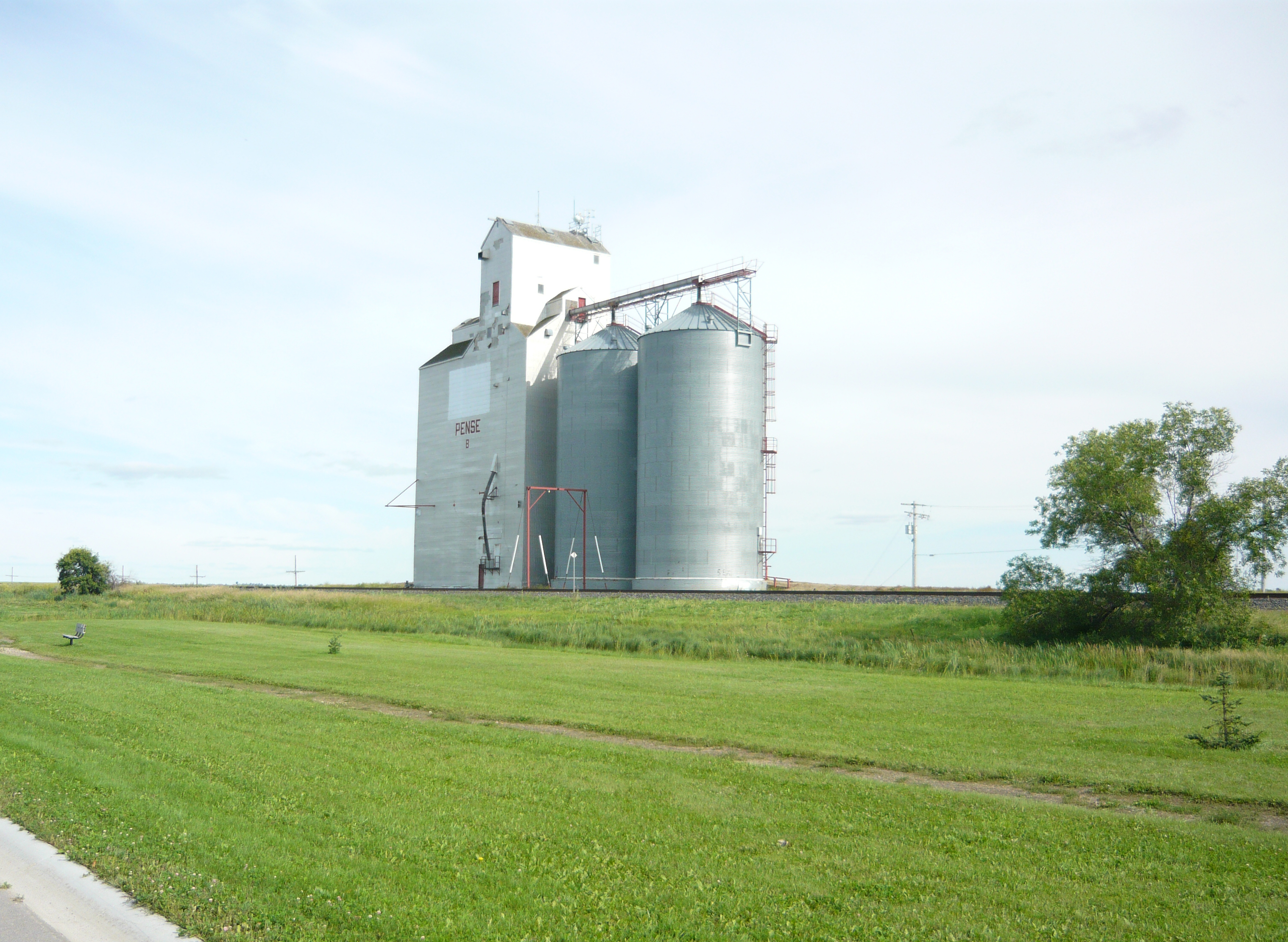
- Grain elevator

- Pense Pense (Canada)
- Coordinates: 50°24′55″N 104°59′05″W
- Country: Canada
- Province: Saskatchewan
- Rural municipality: Pense No. 160
- Post Office established: 1883
- Village: March 7, 1904
- Town: October 24, 2012

Government
  - Administrator: Jennifer Lendvay
  - M.L.A. Lumsden-Morse: Blaine McLeod
  - M.P. Moose Jaw—Lake Centre—Lanigan: Fraser Tolmie

Area
  - Land: 1.32 km^{2} (0.51 sq mi)

Population (2011)
  - Total: 532
  - Density: 402.6/km^{2} (1,043/sq mi)
- Time zone: UTC-6 (UTC)
- Postal code: S0G 3W0
- Area code: 306
- Highways: Highway 1 (TCH) / Highway 623 / Highway 641

Pense is a town of 603 residents (2021 census) in the southern part of Saskatchewan, Canada. Heading west from Regina on the Trans Canada Highway, Pense is the first community with services. Other communities in the area include Grand Coulee, Belle Plaine, Disley, and Rouleau. Pense is approximately 30 kilometres (19 mi) from the city of Regina.

== Demographics ==
In the 2021 Census of Population conducted by Statistics Canada, Pense had a population of 603 living in 210 of its 228 total private dwellings, a change of 2.7% from its 2016 population of 587. With a land area of 1.32 km^{2} (0.51 sq mi), it had a population density of 456.8/km^{2} (1,183.2/sq mi) in 2021.

Canada census – Pense community profile

	2021	2011
Population	603 (+2.7% from 2016)	532 (+4.9% from 2006)
Land area	1.32 km^{2} (0.51 sq mi)	1.32 km^{2} (0.51 sq mi)
Population density	455.6/km^{2} (1,180/sq mi)	402.6/km^{2} (1,043/sq mi)
Median age	34.4 (M: 34.8, F: 33.6)	34.2 (M: 35.0, F: 33.6)
Private dwellings	210 (total)	206 (total)
Median household income

References: 2021 2011

== Destruction of grain elevator ==
On May 3rd, 2021, the grain elevator in Pense was demolished, 20 years after it was shut down by Viterra in 2001.

== See also ==
- List of towns in Saskatchewan
