= Rural Municipality of Touchwood No. 248 =

Rural municipality in Saskatchewan, Canada

Touchwood No. 248
- Rural municipality
- Rural Municipality of Touchwood No. 248
- Location of the RM of Touchwood No. 248 in Saskatchewan
- Coordinates: 51.258°N 104.278°W
- Country: Canada
- Province: Saskatchewan
- Census division: 10
- SARM division: 4
- Formed: December 12, 1910

Government
  - Reeve: Ernest Matai
  - Governing body: RM of Touchwood No. 248 Council
  - Administrator: Lorelei Paulsen
  - Office location: Punnichy

Area (2016)
  - Land: 706.72 km^{2} (272.87 sq mi)

Population (2016)
  - Total: 343
  - Density: 0.5/km^{2} (1.3/sq mi)
- Time zone: CST
  - Summer (DST): CST
- Area codes: 306 and 639

The Rural Municipality of Touchwood No. 248 (2016 population: 343) is a rural municipality (RM) in the Canadian province of Saskatchewan within Census Division No. 10 and SARM Division No. 4.

== History ==
The RM of Touchwood No. 248 incorporated as a rural municipality on December 12, 1910.

== Geography ==
=== Communities and localities ===
The following unincorporated communities are within the RM.

Localities

- Arbury
- Magyar
- Serath
- South Touchwood
- Touchwood
- Zala

== Demographics ==
Population history (1981–2016)
| Year | Pop. | ±% |
|---|---|---|
| 1981 | 597 | — |
| 1986 | 511 | −14.4% |
| 1991 | 482 | −5.7% |
| 1996 | 413 | −14.3% |
| 2001 | 331 | −19.9% |
| 2006 | 287 | −13.3% |
| 2011 | 267 | −7.0% |
| 2016 | 343 | +28.5% |
Source: Statistics Canada via Saskatchewan Bureau of Statistics

In the 2021 Census of Population conducted by Statistics Canada, the RM of Touchwood No. 248 had a population of 373 living in 135 of its 158 total private dwellings, a change of 8.7% from its 2016 population of 343. With a land area of 684.57 km^{2} (264.31 sq mi), it had a population density of 0.5/km^{2} (1.4/sq mi) in 2021.

In the 2016 Census of Population, the RM of Touchwood No. 248 recorded a population of 343 living in 129 of its 147 total private dwellings, a 28.5% change from its 2011 population of 267. With a land area of 706.72 km^{2} (272.87 sq mi), it had a population density of 0.5/km^{2} (1.3/sq mi) in 2016.

== Attractions ==
- Touchwood Hills Post Provincial Historic Park

== Government ==
The RM of Touchwood No. 248 is governed by an elected municipal council and an appointed administrator that meets on the second Tuesday of every month. The reeve of the RM is Ernest Matai while its administrator is Lorelei Paulsen. The RM's office is located in Punnichy.

== Transportation ==
- Highway 6
- Highway 15
- Highway 640
- Highway 731
- Canadian National Railway

== See also ==
- List of rural municipalities in Saskatchewan
