= Craven Dam =

Dam in Saskatchewan, Canada

- Location in Saskatchewan Craven Dam (Canada)
- Interactive map of Craven Dam
- Location: RM of Longlaketon No. 219, Saskatchewan
- Coordinates: 50.7063°N 104.8001°W
- Opening date: 1943
- Owner: Saskatchewan Watershed Authority

Dam and spillways
- Impounds: Qu'Appelle River
- Height: 4.9 m (16 ft)
- Length: 28.4 m (93 ft)

Reservoir
- Catchment area: 23,443 km^{2} (9,051 sq mi)

Craven Dam is at the confluence of the Qu'Appelle River and Last Mountain Creek and immediately east of the village of Craven on the Qu'Appelle River at LSD SW 24-20-21 W2. It is in the Canadian province of Saskatchewan in the RM of Longlaketon No. 219. The dam does not create a reservoir as its purpose is to regulate water flow along the Qu'Appelle River. The dam is operated by the Saskatchewan Water Security Agency and can be accessed on the north side by Highway 99.

Craven Dam is the dividing point between the upper and lower watersheds of the Qu'Appelle River. The total drainage basin of the Qu'Appelle River upstream from the dam is 23,443 km^{2} (9,051 sq mi) and it is divided into five sub-basins, which include Lanigan-Manitou, Wascana Creek, Last Mountain Lake, Upper Qu'Appelle, and Moose Jaw River.

The original Craven Dam was built in 1943 and did not include a fishway. Starting in August of 2002 and finishing in 2003, Agriculture and Agri-Food Canada rebuilt the dam. The new dam included a 29.5-metre (97 ft) long fishway that runs along the north side. It is 3.6 m (12 ft) wide and includes seven vertical baffles within the structure that are designed to reduce flow velocities to create refuges for migrating fish. At the upstream end of the fishway, there is a 1.5 by 1.5-metre gated bay. The dam itself is 28.4 m (93 ft) long and 4.9 m (16 ft) high. The dam consists of four gates, each 4.5 m (15 ft) wide and 2.15 m (7 ft 1 in) high.

Water flow can be reduced through the dam's gates so that water backfloods up Last Mountain Creek and into Last Mountain Lake. In that case, Last Mountain Lake, which is a natural lake, becomes a reservoir. When the dam's gates are open, water from Last Mountain Lake and the Qu'Appelle River flow east and downstream into Pasqua Lake, which is one of the Fishing Lakes.

The fishway is designed with bays that allow researchers to drop a steel fish trap to capture fish for study. Passive Integrated Transponder (PIT) tags were implemented into the abdominal cavity of fish and used to assess fish movements through the fishway. Some of the fished being monitored include the bigmouth buffalo, common carp, lake whitefish, northern pike, quillback, walleye, white sucker, and yellow perch.

== See also ==
- List of dams in Saskatchewan
- Saskatchewan Water Security Agency
- Qu'Appelle River Dam
- Katepwa Dam
