= Saskatchewan Highway 99 =

Provincial highway in Saskatchewan, Canada

Highway 99
- Highway 99 highlighted in red

Route information
- Maintained by Ministry of Highways and Infrastructure
- Length: 20.8 km (12.9 mi)

Major junctions
- West end: Highway 20 near Craven
- East end: CanAm Highway / Highway 6 near Fairy Hill

Location
- Country: Canada
- Province: Saskatchewan
- Rural municipalities: Longlaketon

Highway system
- Provincial highways in Saskatchewan
← Highway 80	→ Highway 102

Highway 99 is a provincial highway in the Canadian province of Saskatchewan. It runs from Highway 20 near Craven to Highway 6 near Fairy Hill. The highway follows the course of the Qu'Appelle River, starting at Highways 20 and 641 in Craven, passing Craven Dam at the west end and ending up at Highway 6 on the east end. It is about 21 kilometres (13 mi) long and unpaved for its entire length.

== Major intersections ==
The entire route is in the Rural Municipality of Longlaketon No. 219. From west to east:

Location	km	mi	Destinations	Notes
Craven	0.00	0.00	Highway 20 – Lumsden, Strasbourg	Western terminus
Craven	0.28	0.17	Highway 641 (Fraser Avenue)	
	20.80	12.92	Highway 6 / CanAm Highway – Southey, Regina	Eastern terminus
1.000 mi = 1.609 km; 1.000 km = 0.621 mi

== See also ==
- Transportation in Saskatchewan
- Roads in Saskatchewan
