= Rural Municipality of Surprise Valley No. 9 =

Rural municipality in Saskatchewan, Canada

Surprise Valley No. 9
- Rural municipality
- Rural Municipality of Surprise Valley No. 9

- Location of the RM of Surprise Valley No. 9 in Saskatchewan
- Coordinates: 49.140°N 104.600°W
- Country: Canada
- Province: Saskatchewan
- Census division: 2
- SARM division: 2
- Federal riding: Souris—Moose Mountain
- Provincial riding: Weyburn-Big Muddy
- Formed: January 1, 1913

Government
  - Reeve: Herb Axten
  - Governing body: RM of Surprise Valley No. 9 Council
  - Administrator: Loran Tessier
  - Office location: Minton

Area (2016)
  - Land: 813.93 km^{2} (314.26 sq mi)

Population (2016)
  - Total: 217
  - Density: 0.3/km^{2} (0.78/sq mi)
- Time zone: CST
  - Summer (DST): CST
- Postal code: S0C 1T0
- Area codes: 306 and 639

The Rural Municipality of Surprise Valley No. 9 (2016 population: 217) is a rural municipality (RM) in the Canadian province of Saskatchewan within Census Division No. 2 and SARM Division No. 2. Located in the southeast portion of the province, it is adjacent to the United States border, neighbouring Sheridan County in Montana.

== History ==
The RM of Surprise Valley No. 9 incorporated as a rural municipality on January 1, 1913.

== Geography ==
=== Communities and localities ===
The following urban municipalities are surrounded by the RM.

Villages

- Minton

The following unincorporated communities are within the RM.

Localities

- Gladmar (dissolved as a village)
- Regway
- Sybouts

== Demographics ==
Population history (1981–2016)
Year	Pop.	±%
1981	383	—
1986	316	−17.5%
1991	274	−13.3%
1996	231	−15.7%
2001	215	−6.9%
2006	199	−7.4%
2011	193	−3.0%
2016	217	+12.4%
Source: Statistics Canada via Saskatchewan Bureau of Statistics

In the 2021 Census of Population conducted by Statistics Canada, the RM of Surprise Valley No. 9 had a population of 211 living in 89 of its 117 total private dwellings, a change of −2.8% from its 2016 population of 217. With a land area of 802.64 km^{2} (309.90 sq mi), it had a population density of 0.3/km^{2} (0.7/sq mi) in 2021.

In the 2016 Census of Population, the RM of Surprise Valley No. 9 recorded a population of 217 living in 88 of its 99 total private dwellings, a −13.5% change from its 2011 population of 251. With a land area of 813.93 km^{2} (314.26 sq mi), it had a population density of 0.3/km^{2} (0.7/sq mi) in 2016.

== Government ==
The RM of Surprise Valley No. 9 is governed by an elected municipal council and an appointed administrator that meets on the second Thursday of every month. The reeve of the RM is Herb Axten while its administrator is Loran Tessier. The RM's office is located in Minton.

== See also ==
- List of rural municipalities in Saskatchewan
