= Sherwood Forest Bridge =

Bridge in Saskatchewan, Canada

- Coordinates: 50.499524°N 104.800272°W
- Carries: Road
- Crosses: Wascana Creek
- Locale: Sherwood R. M., Saskatchewan, Canada

Characteristics
- Design: closed spandrel arch
- Material: Earth Filled - Reinforced Concrete
- Total length: 24.4m

History
- Construction end: August 1920

Location
- Interactive map of Sherwood Forest Bridge

The Sherwood Forest Bridge spans Wascana Creek in the Rural Municipality of Sherwood, 8 kilometres north of Grand Coulee, Saskatchewan, Canada. The bridge also goes by the name Hungry Hollow Bridge. The bridge is located near the Sherwood Forest Country Club. The bridge is one of the few earth filled reinforced concrete bridges still in use within the province and is therefore considered to have historical significance.

In the autumn of 2016, a replacement bridge was constructed adjacent to the Sherwood Forest bridge to carry traffic on Range Road 2212. As of February 2017, the historic bridge was still in use.

== See also ==
- List of bridges in Canada
