= Minton, Saskatchewan =

Village in Saskatchewan, Canada

Village of Minton
- Village
- Location of Minton in Saskatchewan Village of Minton (Canada)
- Coordinates: 49.167°N 104.586°W
- Country: Canada
- Province: Saskatchewan
- Census division: 2
- Rural municipality: Surprise Valley No. 9
- Post office Founded: 1930
- Incorporated (Village): N/A
- Incorporated (Town): N/A

Government
  - Mayor: Dennis Simpart
  - Administrator: Joyce Axten
  - Governing body: Minton Village Council

Area
  - Total: 0.30 km^{2} (0.12 sq mi)

Population (2021)
  - Total: 50
  - Density: 200.7/km^{2} (520/sq mi)
- Time zone: CST
- Postal code: S0C 1T0
- Area code: 306
- Highways: Highway 6

Minton (2021 population: 50) is a village in the Canadian province of Saskatchewan within the Rural Municipality of Surprise Valley No. 9 and Census Division No. 2. It is on Highway 6 just north of its intersection with Highway 18, about 19 kilometres (12 mi) north of the Raymond-Regway Border Crossing on the Montana-Saskatchewan border. The village was named after Minton, Shropshire in England. The name was given by the Canadian Pacific Railway.

== History ==
Minton incorporated as a village on January 1, 1951. Its name is a mixture of the Welsh word mynydd and the Old English word tûn, meaning "mountain estate".

== Demographics ==
Population history (1981–2016)
Year	Pop.	±%
1981	131	—
1986	145	+10.7%
1991	124	−14.5%
1996	101	−18.5%
2001	95	−5.9%
2006	60	−36.8%
2011	60	+0.0%
2016	55	−8.3%
2021	50	−9.1%
Source: Statistics Canada via Saskatchewan Bureau of Statistics

In the 2021 Canadian census conducted by Statistics Canada, Minton had a population of 50 living in 28 of its 39 total private dwellings, a change of −9.1% from its 2016 population of 55. With a land area of 0.25 km^{2} (0.097 sq mi), it had a population density of 200.0/km^{2} (518.0/sq mi) in 2021.

In the 2021 Census of Population, the Village of Minton recorded a population of 50 living in 28 of its 39 total private dwellings, a −10% change from its 2016 population of 55. With a land area of 0.25 km^{2} (0.097 sq mi), it had a population density of 200.0/km^{2} (518.0/sq mi) in 2021.

== Attractions ==
- An inuksuk monument is approximately 8 km (5.0 mi) north of Minton on Highway 6 (49.2319°N 104.6059°W).
- About 15 km (9.3 mi) west of Minton in the Big Muddy Badlands is the Minton Turtle Effigy (49.1874°N 104.7469°W).

== See also ==
- List of communities in Saskatchewan
- List of villages in Saskatchewan
