= Dafoe, Saskatchewan =

Community in Saskatchewan, Canada

Dafoe
- Special service area
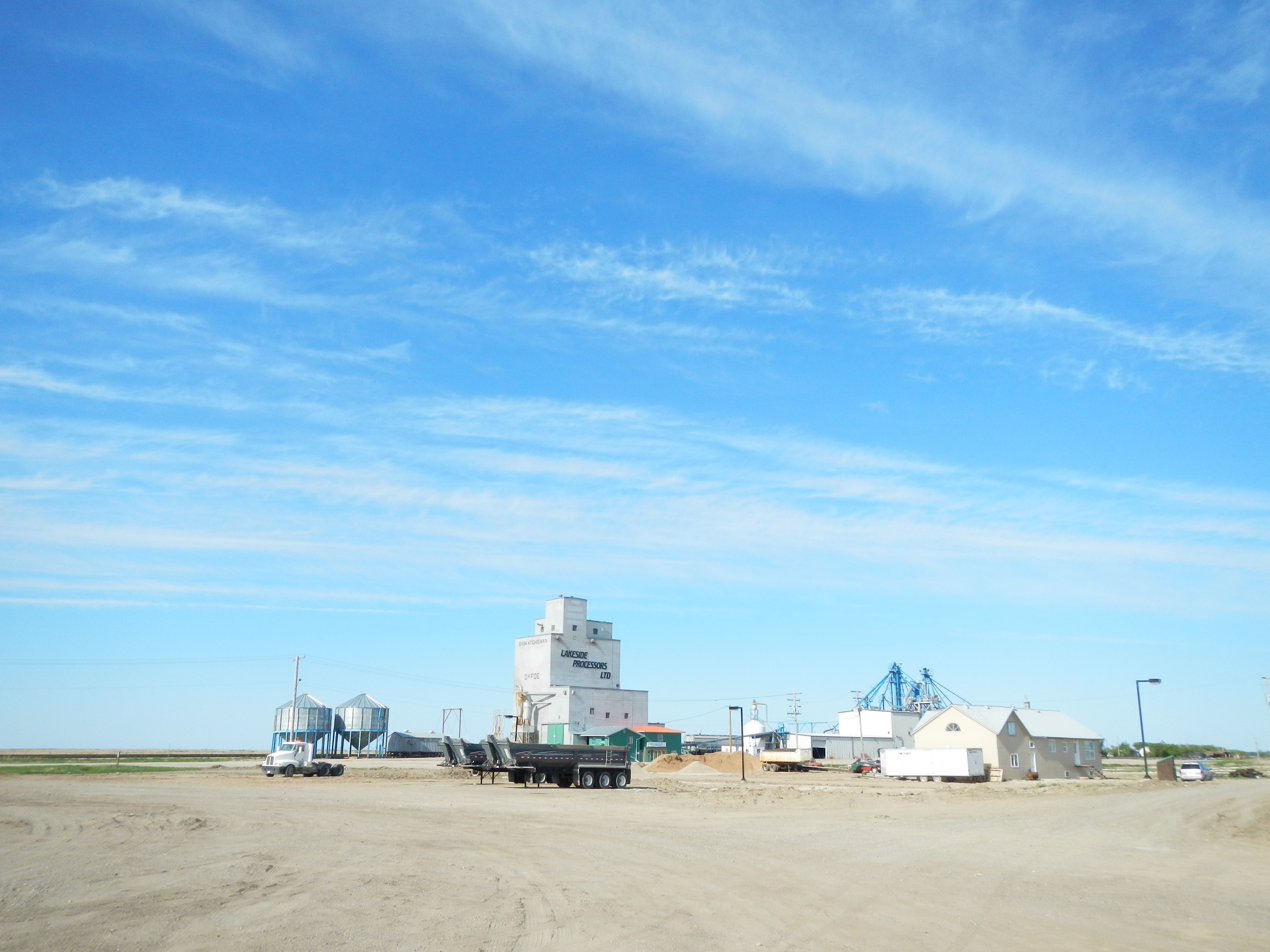
- Industrial area in Dafoe

- Location of Dafoe in Saskatchewan Dafoe (Canada)
- Coordinates: 51°45′12″N 104°31′23″W
- Country: Canada
- Province: Saskatchewan
- Region: Saskatchewan
- Census division: 10
- Rural municipality (RM): Big Quill No. 308
- Post office founded: July 1, 1911
- Incorporated (village): May 28, 1920
- Dissolved (Special service area): July 31, 2018

Government
  - Type: Municipal
  - Governing body: Dafoe Village Council
  - Mayor: Bob Pilkey
  - Administrator: Santana Dawson

Area
  - Total: 0.80 km^{2} (0.31 sq mi)

Population (2016)
  - Total: 15
  - Density: 18.7/km^{2} (48/sq mi)
- Time zone: UTC-6 (CST)
- Postal code: S0K 1C0
- Area code: 306
- Highways: Highway 6 Highway 16

Dafoe (2016 population: 15) is a special service area in the Canadian province of Saskatchewan within the Rural Municipality of Big Quill No. 308 and Census Division No. 10. It was a village prior to August 2018. Dafoe is east of the intersection of Highway 6 and 16 and southwest of Big Quill Lake. The Dafoe Brook flows to the east of the community. Dafoe marks the far western end of the area known to Icelandic settlers in Saskatchewan as the Lakes Settlement (Icelandic: Vatnabyggð).

== History ==
Dafoe incorporated as a village on May 28, 1920. It restructured on July 31, 2018, relinquishing its village status in favour of becoming a special service area under the jurisdiction of the Rural Municipality of Big Quill No. 308.

== Demographics ==
In the 2016 Census of Population conducted by Statistics Canada, the Village of Dafoe recorded a population of 15 living in 7 of its 10 total private dwellings, a 0% change from its 2011 population of 15. With a land area of 0.8 km^{2} (0.31 sq mi), it had a population density of 18.8/km^{2} (48.6/sq mi) in 2016.

In the 2011 Census of Population, the Village of Dafoe recorded a population of 15, a 50% change from its 2006 population of 10. With a land area of 0.8 km^{2} (0.31 sq mi), it had a population density of 18.8/km^{2} (48.6/sq mi) in 2011.

== Attractions ==
Freba Pottery is about 7 kilometres (4.3 mi) east of Dafoe on the north side of Highway 16. The tiny pottery shop has handmade pottery and other creations from local artists. Payment is on the honour system.

== See also ==
- RCAF Station Dafoe
- List of communities in Saskatchewan
- List of special service areas in Saskatchewan
