= A Kandahar Away =

- Directed by: Aisha Jamal
- Written by: Aisha Jamal
- Produced by: Deborah Parks
- Cinematography: Max Armstrong; John Westheuser
- Edited by: Geoff Matheson
- Music by: Bruce Fowler
- Release date: May 1, 2019 (Hot Docs)
- Running time: 83 minutes
- Country: Canada
- Language: English

A Kandahar Away is a Canadian documentary film, directed by Aisha Jamal and released in 2019. Centred on her own family, who came to Canada as refugees from Kandahar, Afghanistan during the War in Afghanistan, the film documents a family trip to Kandahar, Saskatchewan, where her father Abdul has purchased plots of land for his children as a way to give them back a small piece of their heritage.

The film premiered at the 2019 Hot Docs Canadian International Documentary Festival. and later received a television broadcast on Documentary.

The film was longlisted for the 2019 DGC Discovery Award.
