= Serath =

Hamlet in Saskatchewan, Canada

Coordinates: 51°11′00″N 104°31′02″W

Location of Serath in Saskatchewan

Serath is a hamlet in Saskatchewan, Canada. It is situated along Highway 6 (the CanAm Highway) and West Loon Creek, on the boundary line between the Rural Municipalities of Longlaketon No. 219 and Touchwood No. 248

== See also ==
- List of communities in Saskatchewan
