= Rural Municipality of Sherwood No. 159 =

Rural municipality in Saskatchewan, Canada

Sherwood No. 159
- Rural municipality
- Rural Municipality of Sherwood No. 159

- Location of the RM of Sherwood No. 159 in Saskatchewan
- Coordinates: 50.473°N 104.627°W
- Country: Canada
- Province: Saskatchewan
- Census division: 6
- SARM division: 2
- Federal riding: Moose Jaw—Lake Centre—Lanigan; Regina—Qu'Appelle
- Provincial riding: Indian Head-Milestone; Lumsden-Morse
- Formed: December 11, 1911

Government
  - Reeve: Ray Orb
  - Governing body: RM of Sherwood No. 159 Council
  - Administrator: Christine Trithardt
  - Office location: Regina

Area (2016)
  - Land: 656.87 km^{2} (253.62 sq mi)

Population (2016)
  - Total: 974
  - Density: 1.5/km^{2} (3.9/sq mi)
- Time zone: CST
  - Summer (DST): CST
- Postal code: S4W 0L3
- Area codes: 306 and 639
- Website: Official website

The Rural Municipality of Sherwood No. 159 (2016 population: 974) is a rural municipality (RM) in the Canadian province of Saskatchewan within Census Division No. 6 and SARM Division No. 2. In the south-central portion of the province, it surrounds the city of Regina, the provincial capital, and forms part of the Regina census metropolitan area.

== History ==
The RM of Sherwood No. 159 incorporated as a rural municipality on December 11, 1911. The RM was named after the Sherwood School District No. 460, which itself was named after Sherwood, Ontario, where some of the early settlers to the area originated from.

=== Heritage properties ===
The RM has two heritage properties.

- Boggy Creek School - Built in 1923 as a One-room school, the building was used as a school until 1965. After that point it was used by Regina Board of Education for an outdoor program. The site had an older school building dating back to 1886. The school is located 10 km northwest of Regina. The building is of brick construction based on a Waterman-Waterbury Company design.
- Normand Farm Residence - Built in 1905 as a homestead, the two-story residence is made from fieldstone and brick. Still in use as a residence the building is located on Zehner Road,

== Geography ==
The RM features heavy clay soils, making it one of the richest farming areas in the province. The Wascana Valley and Wascana Creek meander through the RM. The Sherwood Forest Bridge crosses Wascana Creek within the RM.

At the north-west corner of the RM, in the Wascana Valley, is the Wascana Trails provincial recreation site.

=== Communities and localities ===
The following urban municipalities are surrounded by the RM.

==== Cities ====
- Regina

==== Towns ====
- Grand Coulee

== Demographics ==
Population history (1981–2016)
Year	Pop.	±%
1981	1,329	—
1986	1,218	−8.4%
1991	1,098	−9.9%
1996	1,056	−3.8%
2001	1,054	−0.2%
2006	1,075	+2.0%
2011	929	−13.6%
2016	974	+4.8%
Source: Statistics Canada via Saskatchewan Bureau of Statistics

In the 2021 Census of Population conducted by Statistics Canada, the RM of Sherwood No. 159 had a population of 1,219 living in 274 of its 302 total private dwellings, a change of 25.2% from its 2016 population of 974. With a land area of 656.66 km^{2} (253.54 sq mi), it had a population density of 1.9/km^{2} (4.8/sq mi) in 2021.

In the 2016 Census of Population, the RM of Sherwood No. 159 recorded a population of 974 living in 309 of its 325 total private dwellings, a 10.8% change from its 2011 population of 879. With a land area of 656.87 km^{2} (253.62 sq mi), it had a population density of 1.5/km^{2} (3.8/sq mi) in 2016.

== Economy ==
The Sherwood Industrial Park is also within the RM, which is a home to the steel manufacturer InterPro Pipe and Steel (formerly Evraz & IPSCO), agricultural implement manufacturers and dealerships, trucking companies, and medical hazardous waste disposal facilities.

== Government ==
The RM of Sherwood No. 159 is governed by an elected municipal council and an appointed administrator that meets on the second Wednesday of every month. The interim reeve of the RM is currently former SARM president Ray Orb while its acting administrator is Christine Trithardt. The RM's office is located in Regina.

== See also ==
- List of rural municipalities in Saskatchewan
