= 2005 Canada Summer Games =

- Host city: Regina, Saskatchewan
- Opening: August 6
- Closing: August 20

Summer

The 2005 Canada Summer Games were held in Regina, Saskatchewan, during 6–20 August 2005. This was the 20th edition of the games and marked the province's centennial year. 3,511 athletes competed in 101 events across 16 sports, including the first appearance of women's wrestling at the games. The games also had the first appearance of diversity ambassadors and athletes competing in multiple sports. Attendance was estimated at 12,000 visitors.

Venues included the Centre for Kinesiology at the University of Regina and the Eventplex at Regina Exhibition Park (now part of the REAL District). The planning and execution of the games was overseen by the Project Management Institute, coordinating 6,000 volunteers on a 40-month project with a budget of $23.4 million. The games concluded with a financial surplus which benefited the Dreams and Champions legacy program, and more than $600,000 of sporting equipment was donated to organizations in the area. The upgrades to Regina's sports facilities led to the city bidding for the 2008, 2011 and 2014 North American Indigenous Games (NAIG), ultimately hosting in July 2014.

== Medal standings ==
Rank	Province or Territory	Gold	Silver	Bronze	Total	Ref
1	Ontario	63	45	50	158	
2	Quebec	50	42	43	135	
3	British Columbia	42	44	33	119	
4	Alberta	29	34	37	100	
5	Saskatchewan	15	26	26	67	
6	Nova Scotia	15	15	16	46	
7	Manitoba	4	7	6	17	
8	Prince Edward Island	2	0	0	2	
9	New Brunswick	1	4	1	6	
10	Newfoundland and Labrador	0	4	5	9	
11	Yukon	0	0	1	1	
12	Northwest Territories	0	0	0	0	
12	Nunavut	0	0	0	0	
Total	13	221	221	218	660	

== Venues ==
- Athletics – Douglas Park Track
- Baseball – Currie Field and Optimist Park
- Basketball – The Centre for Kinesiology, Health and Sport, University of Regina
- Canoeing – Wascana Lake
- Cycling – Lumsden, Wascana Trails, University of Regina and Wascana Park
- Diving – Lawson Aquatic Centre
- Field hockey – Taylor Field
- Rowing – Wascana Lake
- Rugby union – Regina Rugby Park
- Sailing – Saskatchewan Beach
- Women's Soccer – Mount Pleasant Sports Park
- Men's Soccer – Moose Jaw
- Women's Softball – Elks Athletic Park, Moose Jaw
- Men's Softball – Rambler Park
- Swimming – Lawson Aquatic Centre
- Tennis – Lakeshore Tennis Club
- Volleyball – The Centre for Kinesiology, Health and Sport, University of Regina
- Wrestling – Regina Exhibition Park

== See also ==
- Canada Games
- Canada Summer Games
- List of Canada Games

Canada Games
Preceded by 2003 Canada Games	Canada Games; 2005	Succeeded by 2007 Canada Games
Preceded by 2001 Canada Summer Games	Canada Summer Games; 2005	Succeeded by 2009 Canada Summer Games
