= Wascana Trails =

Interconnected hiking and mountain biking trails in Saskatchewan

Coordinates: 50°33′26″N 104°50′29″W

The Wascana Trails (formally known as Wascana Valley Nature Recreation Site) are a series of interconnected hiking and mountain biking trails in the Canadian province of Saskatchewan, offering 15 kilometres (9.3 mi) of marked trails. The trails are located 8 kilometres (5.0 mi) north-west of Regina in the RM of Sherwood No. 159 in a deep ravine carrying a tributary of the Qu'Appelle River called Wascana Creek.

It is the largest mountain biking destination in the Regina area, offering trails of all difficulty levels. The more difficult trails climb in and out of the valley, while the easier ones are located in the bottom of the valley and are mostly flat.

The trails were developed for use in the 2005 Canada Summer Games and are currently preserved as a Provincial Recreation Site.

== See also ==
- List of protected areas of Saskatchewan
