= Raymond–Regway Border Crossing =

Border crossing between Canada and the United States

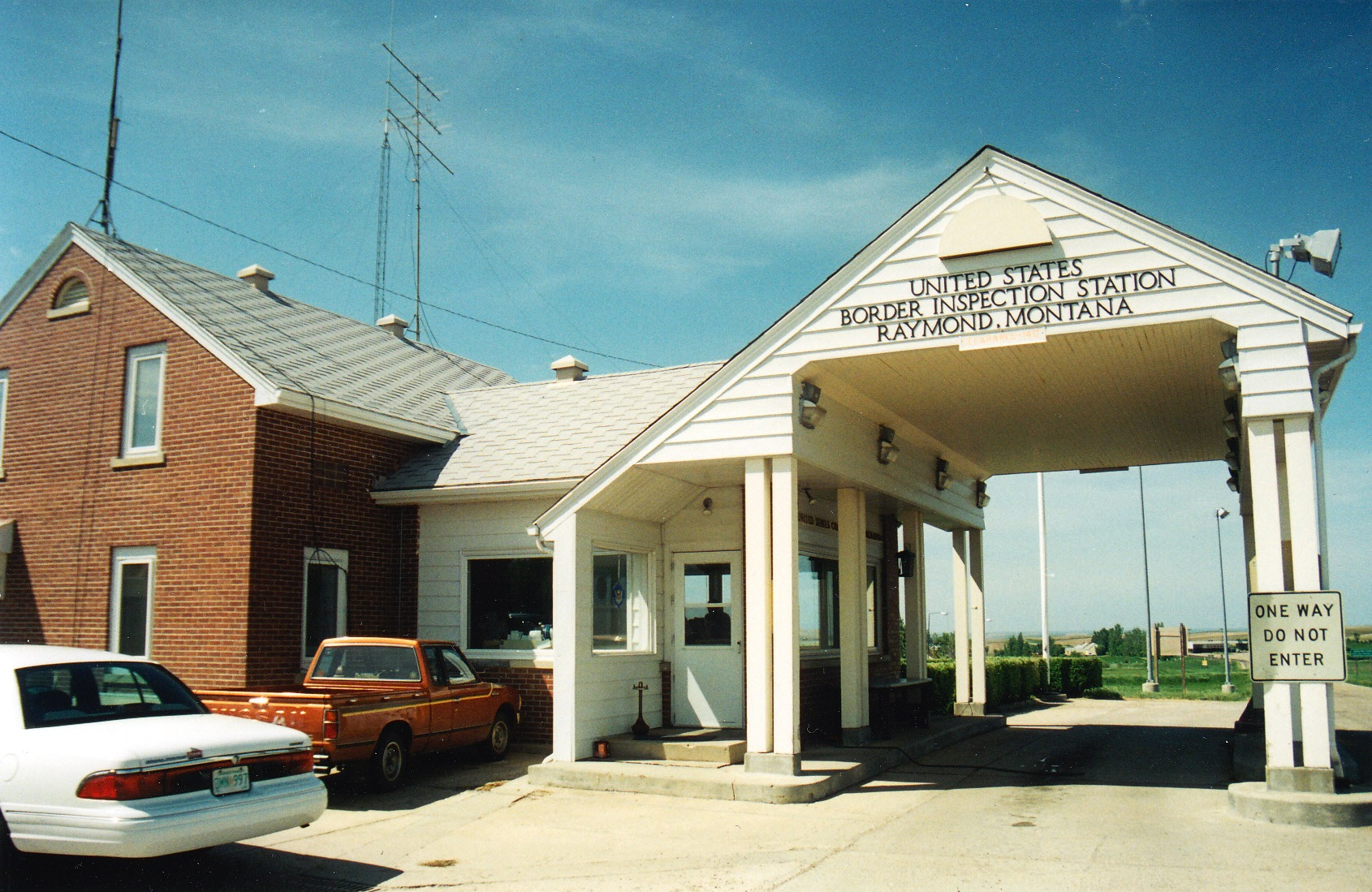
- US Border Inspection Station at Raymond, Montana as seen in 1996 (since replaced)

Locaiton
- Country: United States; Canada
- Location: MT 16 / Highway 6; US Port: 1559 Highway 16 North, Raymond, MT 59256; Canadian Port: Highway 6, Regway, SK S0C 1T0
- Coordinates: 48.999198°N 104.574568°W

Details
- Opened: 1931

Website
- http://www.cbp.gov/contact/ports/raymond

The Raymond–Regway Border Crossing connects the towns of Plentywood, Montana and Minton, Saskatchewan on the Canada–US border. It is reached by Montana Highway 16 on the American side and Saskatchewan Highway 6 on the Canadian side. It was the only 24-hour crossing on the Montana–Saskatchewan segment of the border. It is also the easternmost crossing in Montana. The US border station was built in 1937 and replaced in 2005. Canada's previous border station, which was built in 1978, is still in use and expected to be replaced in the near future.

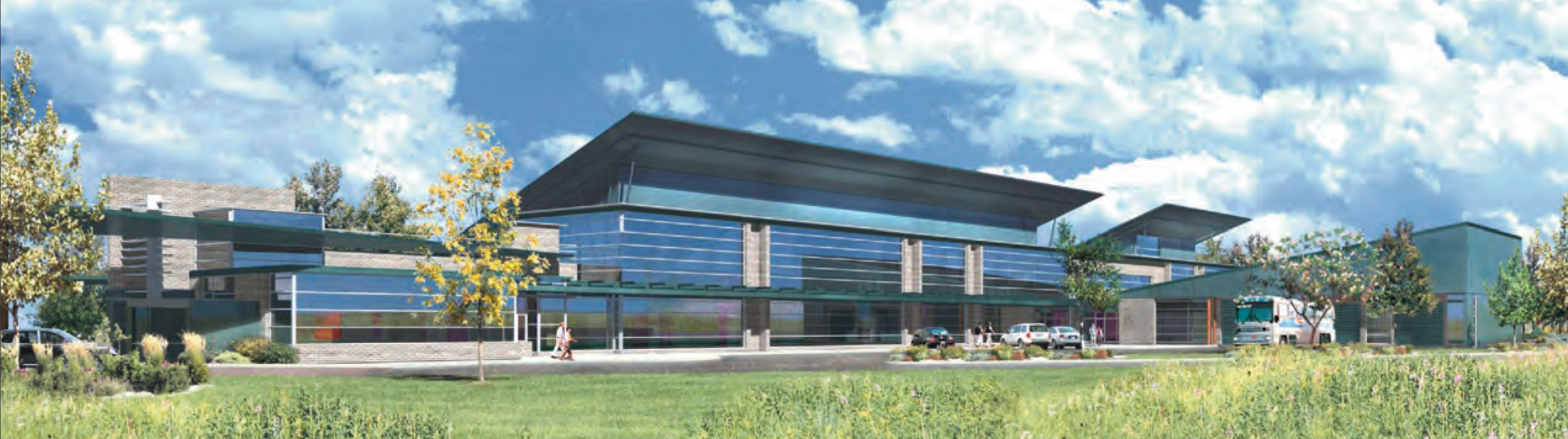
New US Border Station at Raymond, MT

== Climate ==
Raymond Border Station has a dry-winter humid continental climate (Köppen Dwb), with a low average annual precipitation of 15.13 inches (381.9 mm); it is near the threshold required to be classified as a cold semi-arid climate (Köppen BSk).

Climate data for Raymond Border Station, Montana, 1991–2020 normals, 1950-2020 extremes: 2345ft (715m)
Month	Jan	Feb	Mar	Apr	May	Jun	Jul	Aug	Sep	Oct	Nov	Dec	Year
Record high °F (°C)	56 (13)	68 (20)	77 (25)	91 (33)	101 (38)	106 (41)	110 (43)	107 (42)	100 (38)	93 (34)	74 (23)	58 (14)	110 (43)
Mean maximum °F (°C)	43.0 (6.1)	44.5 (6.9)	61.2 (16.2)	75.8 (24.3)	84.1 (28.9)	89.1 (31.7)	93.1 (33.9)	94.4 (34.7)	90.6 (32.6)	77.3 (25.2)	58.5 (14.7)	43.8 (6.6)	96.4 (35.8)
Mean daily maximum °F (°C)	20.7 (−6.3)	25.2 (−3.8)	37.9 (3.3)	54.5 (12.5)	66.5 (19.2)	74.2 (23.4)	81.1 (27.3)	81.4 (27.4)	71.0 (21.7)	54.4 (12.4)	36.3 (2.4)	23.8 (−4.6)	52.2 (11.2)
Daily mean °F (°C)	11.3 (−11.5)	15.2 (−9.3)	27.3 (−2.6)	41.5 (5.3)	53.1 (11.7)	61.6 (16.4)	67.6 (19.8)	67.0 (19.4)	57.2 (14.0)	42.7 (5.9)	26.9 (−2.8)	15.3 (−9.3)	40.6 (4.8)
Mean daily minimum °F (°C)	2.0 (−16.7)	5.3 (−14.8)	16.8 (−8.4)	28.6 (−1.9)	39.7 (4.3)	49.1 (9.5)	54.1 (12.3)	52.6 (11.4)	43.4 (6.3)	31.0 (−0.6)	17.5 (−8.1)	6.7 (−14.1)	28.9 (−1.7)
Mean minimum °F (°C)	−24.4 (−31.3)	−18.9 (−28.3)	−8.9 (−22.7)	12.3 (−10.9)	26.3 (−3.2)	38.8 (3.8)	44.7 (7.1)	41.2 (5.1)	28.2 (−2.1)	13.4 (−10.3)	−3.9 (−19.9)	−18.0 (−27.8)	−28.1 (−33.4)
Record low °F (°C)	−44 (−42)	−41 (−41)	−31 (−35)	−15 (−26)	12 (−11)	22 (−6)	35 (2)	32 (0)	10 (−12)	−9 (−23)	−29 (−34)	−41 (−41)	−44 (−42)
Average precipitation inches (mm)	0.39 (9.9)	0.47 (12)	0.52 (13)	1.16 (29)	2.17 (55)	3.24 (82)	2.64 (67)	1.78 (45)	1.07 (27)	0.80 (20)	0.40 (10)	0.49 (12)	15.13 (381.9)
Average snowfall inches (cm)	7.70 (19.6)	4.60 (11.7)	4.20 (10.7)	2.00 (5.1)	0.10 (0.25)	0.00 (0.00)	0.00 (0.00)	0.00 (0.00)	0.00 (0.00)	1.50 (3.8)	2.70 (6.9)	8.50 (21.6)	31.3 (79.65)
Source 1: NOAA
Source 2: XMACIS (temp records & monthly max/mins)

== See also ==
- List of Canada–United States border crossings
