= Wynyard, Saskatchewan =

Town in Saskatchewan, Canada

Wynyard
- Town
- Location within Saskatchewan Location within Canada
- Coordinates: 51.766667°N 104.183333°W
- Country: Canada
- Province: Saskatchewan
- Rural Municipality: Big Quill No. 308
- Settled: 1905
- Village: 1908
- Town: 1911

Government
  - Mayor: Sigourney Hoytfox
  - Administrator: Jason Chorneyko
  - Governing body: Wynyard Town Council
  - MLA Kelvington-Wadena: Hugh Nerlien
  - MP Regina-Qu'Appelle: Andrew Scheer

Area
  - Total: 5.29 km^{2} (2.04 sq mi)
- Elevation: 551 m (1,808 ft)

Population (2016)
  - Total: 1,732
  - Density: 334.1/km^{2} (865/sq mi)
- Time zone: UTC−06:00 (CST)
- Postal code: S0A 4T0
- Area code: 306
- Website: www.townofwynyard.com

Wynyard is a town in eastern Saskatchewan, Canada, 132 kilometres (82 mi) west of Yorkton and 190 kilometres (120 mi) east of Saskatoon. Wynyard is surrounded by the Rural Municipality of Big Quill No. 308. It is located on the Yellowhead Highway just south of Big Quill Lake.

== History ==
Many of the early settlers to the area around Big Quill Lake were of Icelandic origin, and the ethnic block settlement area was called the Vatnabyggd settlement. Sleipnir, a store and post office, was located at NE 30-22-15 W2 and was the centre of community life of the Vatnabyggd settlement until it was moved into Wynyard in 1908.

The first wave of Icelandic settlers in the Wynyard area was soon followed by numerous Ukrainian settlers and then British, Polish, and German settlers.

== Demographics ==
In the 2021 Census of Population conducted by Statistics Canada, Wynyard had a population of 1,724 living in 808 of its 911 total private dwellings, a change of −4.1% from its 2016 population of 1,798. With a land area of 5.32 km^{2} (2.05 sq mi), it had a population density of 324.1/km^{2} (839.3/sq mi) in 2021.

Canada census – Wynyard, Saskatchewan community profile

| | 2011 |
| Population | 1,767 (+1.3% from 2006) |
| Land area | 5.29 km^{2} (2.04 sq mi) |
| Population density | 334.1/km^{2} (865/sq mi) |
| Median age | 46.9 (M: 43.8, F: 50.5) |
| Private dwellings | 913 (total) |
| Median household income |

References: 2011

== Climate ==
Climate data for Wynyard, 1981–2010 normals, extremes 1939–present
| Month | Jan | Feb | Mar | Apr | May | Jun | Jul | Aug | Sep | Oct | Nov | Dec | Year |
|---|---|---|---|---|---|---|---|---|---|---|---|---|---|
| Record high °C (°F) | 7.4 (45.3) | 8.0 (46.4) | 19.5 (67.1) | 31.0 (87.8) | 36.1 (97.0) | 38.5 (101.3) | 36.7 (98.1) | 36.7 (98.1) | 36.1 (97.0) | 29.5 (85.1) | 22.0 (71.6) | 12.8 (55.0) | 38.5 (101.3) |
| Mean daily maximum °C (°F) | −10.9 (12.4) | −7.6 (18.3) | −1.4 (29.5) | 9.3 (48.7) | 17.0 (62.6) | 21.4 (70.5) | 23.9 (75.0) | 23.9 (75.0) | 17.1 (62.8) | 9.1 (48.4) | −1.8 (28.8) | −8.5 (16.7) | 7.6 (45.7) |
| Daily mean °C (°F) | −15.9 (3.4) | −12.5 (9.5) | −6.2 (20.8) | 3.6 (38.5) | 10.6 (51.1) | 15.5 (59.9) | 17.9 (64.2) | 17.4 (63.3) | 11.1 (52.0) | 3.7 (38.7) | −6.1 (21.0) | −13.3 (8.1) | 2.2 (36.0) |
| Mean daily minimum °C (°F) | −21.0 (−5.8) | −17.3 (0.9) | −11.0 (12.2) | −2.2 (28.0) | 4.1 (39.4) | 9.6 (49.3) | 11.8 (53.2) | 10.9 (51.6) | 5.1 (41.2) | −1.6 (29.1) | −10.3 (13.5) | −17.9 (−0.2) | −3.3 (26.1) |
| Record low °C (°F) | −46.7 (−52.1) | −42.5 (−44.5) | −37.0 (−34.6) | −29.3 (−20.7) | −12.5 (9.5) | −2.8 (27.0) | 0.6 (33.1) | −2.8 (27.0) | −8.9 (16.0) | −21.7 (−7.1) | −35.0 (−31.0) | −43.0 (−45.4) | −46.7 (−52.1) |
| Average precipitation mm (inches) | 15.5 (0.61) | 10.7 (0.42) | 20.2 (0.80) | 20.4 (0.80) | 46.2 (1.82) | 71.9 (2.83) | 70.4 (2.77) | 57.5 (2.26) | 40.7 (1.60) | 26.9 (1.06) | 14.4 (0.57) | 18.5 (0.73) | 413.3 (16.27) |
| Average rainfall mm (inches) | 0.2 (0.01) | 0.5 (0.02) | 3.3 (0.13) | 12.2 (0.48) | 41.9 (1.65) | 71.9 (2.83) | 70.4 (2.77) | 57.5 (2.26) | 38.3 (1.51) | 15.6 (0.61) | 1.4 (0.06) | 0.7 (0.03) | 313.8 (12.35) |
| Average snowfall cm (inches) | 18.1 (7.1) | 11.7 (4.6) | 18.9 (7.4) | 9.5 (3.7) | 4.9 (1.9) | 0.0 (0.0) | 0.0 (0.0) | 0.0 (0.0) | 2.5 (1.0) | 10.6 (4.2) | 15.1 (5.9) | 21.1 (8.3) | 112.2 (44.2) |
| Mean monthly sunshine hours | 98.4 | 124.8 | 176.9 | 226.1 | 268.4 | 270.5 | 310.6 | 284.6 | 196.4 | 151.5 | 93.7 | 82.7 | 2,284.7 |
| Percentage possible sunshine | 37.9 | 44.5 | 48.2 | 54.4 | 55.4 | 54.3 | 62.0 | 62.8 | 51.6 | 45.7 | 35.1 | 33.8 | 48.8 |
Source: Environment Canada

== Attractions ==
The Frank Cameron Museum is closed, but there is a museum, downtown, on Avenue B. It has a good selection of local historical artefacts and pictures, and occasionally has special exhibits, such as "wedding dresses through the decades".

- Wynyard Regional Park is the local campground 2.4 kilometres (1.5 mi) south of Highway 16 on Highway 640
- Wynyard is located just to the south-east of Big Quill Lake which is the largest saline lake in Canada, and south-west of Little Quill Lake
- Mud Lake Wildlife Refuge is 19 kilometres (12 mi) from town
- Wynyard Golf Club (a 9-hole golf course) offers the Wynyard Hole in One Tournament, Wynyard Ladies Night Golf, and Wynyard Men's Night Golf
- The Wynyard Swimming Pool and the Wynyard Stingrays Synchronized Swimming Team

=== Heritage sites ===
Three of designated heritage sites are located in Wynyard:

- Wynyard Court House (built in 1927)
- Canadian Pacific Railway Station (built in 1909)
- Wynyard Federated Church (built in 1921)

== Activities and sports ==
The town of Wynyard has several sports teams: the Wynyard Blues Mens Fastball Team, the Wynyard Monarchs hockey team of the Long Lake Hockey League (LLHL), and the Wynyard Monarchs of the senior men's Highway Hockey League.

Wynyard plays host to many activities and groups such as Wynyard Air Cadets, Wynyard Minor Baseball, Wynyard Minor Hockey, Wynyard Fireman's Association, Wynyard Kinettes, Wynyard Kinsmen, Wynyard Legion, Wynyard School of Dance, Wynyard Senior Appreciation Days, Wynyard Senior Centre, and Wynyard Shriners.

== Media ==
- The local news is reported in the Wynyard Advance Gazette.
- Television channel stations which reach Yorkton are CBC, CTV as well as all Yorkton channels.
- Local Radio Station is 107.5 Bolt FM, located in Humboldt.

== Transportation ==
Wynyard is located on Highway 16. Wynyard was made a divisional point on the Canadian Pacific Railway when it came through. No longer providing passenger service the Wynyard railway station is a designated historical railway station.

Wynyard/W. B. Needham Field Aerodrome also facilitate transportation in and out of Wynyard and area.

== Education ==
The town is home to the Wynyard Elementary School and Wynyard Composite High School in the Horizon School Division #205. The high school team, the Wynyard Golden Bears, play basketball, football, volleyball, and soccer. The high school also participates in cross country, track, and badminton.

The one-room school houses of the early 1900s were called Wynyard School District #2499 and Nordra School #1947. The latter offered a course in Icelandic when it was first constructed in 1907 as the early school administration allowed an hour each day from 3 pm to 4 pm for foreign language instruction. Currently there are several venues for education in Wynyard.

== See also ==
- List of towns in Saskatchewan
- List of communities in Saskatchewan
- List of historic places in Saskatchewan
