= Wynyard station (Saskatchewan) =

Railway station in Saskatchewan, Canada

Coordinates: 51.7719°N 104.1862°W

Wynyard

General information
- Location: A Avenue at Bosworth St. Wynyard, Saskatchewan
- Line: Canadian Pacific Railway

History
- Opened: 1909

Former services
Preceding station	Canadian Pacific Railway	Following station
Kandahar toward Edmonton	Edmonton – Portage la Prairie	Mozart toward Portage la Prairie
Location

Wynyard station is a former railway station located in Wynyard, Saskatchewan, Canada. The building was constructed by Canadian Pacific Railway, it is now only used for administrative offices. The station served as a division point on the mainline between Winnipeg and Edmonton and comprises:

- one 1½-storey clapboard building including a passage waiting area and a 1-storey freight/baggage area
- a round house and
- remnants of the station garden

The building was designated a historic railway station in 1991.

== See also ==
- List of designated heritage railway stations of Canada
