= Fairy Hill, Saskatchewan =

Community in Saskatchewan, Canada

Fairy Hill
- unincorporated place
- Location of Fairy Hill in Saskatchewan Fairy Hill (Canada)
- Coordinates: 50°49′00″N 104°34′02″W
- Country: Canada
- Province: Saskatchewan
- Rural Municipality: Longlaketon No. 219
- Post office founded: 1901
- Post office closed: 1969

Government
  - Type: Reeve-Council
  - Governing Body: Rural municipality council
  - Reeve: Ethan Osterhold
- Elevation: 502 m (1,647 ft)
- Time zone: UTC-6 (CST)
  - Summer (DST): UTC-6 (CST (No DST))
- Postal code: S0G 4P0
- Area Codes: 306 / 639
- ISO 3166 code: CA-SK
- Federal Electoral District: Moose Jaw-Lake Centre-Lanigan
- Provincial Electoral District: Last Mountain-Touchwood
- MP: Tom Lukiwski (CPC)
- MLA: Glen Hart (SP)
- Highways: Hwy 6 Hwy 99
- Waterways: Qu'Appelle River

Fairy Hill is a hamlet located in the Qu'Appelle Valley of Saskatchewan, Canada. It is located in the Rural Municipality of Longlaketon No. 219 on the crossroads of Highway 6 and Highway 99. A post office existed in Fairy Hill from 1901 to 1969. Today, the locality is home to multiple farms along with the Fairy Hill Trails.

== History ==
The post office in Fairy Hill opened in 1901, and the first postmaster was Robert Mollard. The name Fairy Hill was chosen by the postmaster's wife. It is named after the Fairy Hill Estate on the Isle of Wight in England, which is the birthplace of Henry Cyril Lawson who founded the nearby Glen Ranche in 1895. Lawson died in 1940, and the town's post office closed in 1969.

== Geography ==
The hamlet is situated at the bottom of the Qu'Appelle Valley at one of the more wide points in the valley. It sits around 502 m (1650 ft) above sea level.

=== Climate ===
Fairy Hill experiences a humid continental climate (Köppen climate classification Dfb, USDA Plant Hardiness Zone with warm summers and cold winters, prone to extremes at all times of the year. Average annual precipitation is 388 mm (15.28 in) and is heaviest from June through August, with June being the wettest month with an average of 75 mm (2.95 in) of precipitation. The average daily temperature for the year is 2.8 °C (37.0 °F). The lowest temperature ever recorded in the area was −50.0 °C (−58.0 °F) on 1 January 1885, while the highest recorded temperature was 43.3 °C (109.9 °F) on 5 July 1937.

Climate data for Fairy Hill, Saskatchewan
Month	Jan	Feb	Mar	Apr	May	Jun	Jul	Aug	Sep	Oct	Nov	Dec	Year
Record high humidex	9.7	10.9	21.2	31.9	37.6	42.2	48.3	43.7	39.3	32.1	23.4	13.0	48.3
Record high °C (°F)	10.4 (50.7)	15.6 (60.1)	24.4 (75.9)	32.8 (91.0)	37.2 (99.0)	40.6 (105.1)	43.3 (109.9)	40.6 (105.1)	37.2 (99.0)	32.0 (89.6)	23.6 (74.5)	15.0 (59.0)	43.3 (109.9)
Mean daily maximum °C (°F)	−9.3 (15.3)	−6.4 (20.5)	0.4 (32.7)	11.6 (52.9)	18.5 (65.3)	22.8 (73.0)	25.8 (78.4)	25.5 (77.9)	19.1 (66.4)	11.0 (51.8)	0.1 (32.2)	−7.1 (19.2)	9.3 (48.7)
Daily mean °C (°F)	−14.7 (5.5)	−11.7 (10.9)	−4.8 (23.4)	4.8 (40.6)	11.3 (52.3)	16.2 (61.2)	18.9 (66.0)	18.1 (64.6)	11.8 (53.2)	4.3 (39.7)	−5.2 (22.6)	−12.4 (9.7)	3.1 (37.6)
Mean daily minimum °C (°F)	−20.1 (−4.2)	−17.0 (1.4)	−9.9 (14.2)	−2.0 (28.4)	4.1 (39.4)	9.5 (49.1)	11.9 (53.4)	10.7 (51.3)	4.6 (40.3)	−2.4 (27.7)	−10.5 (13.1)	−17.7 (0.1)	−3.2 (26.2)
Record low °C (°F)	−50.0 (−58.0)	−47.8 (−54.0)	−40.6 (−41.1)	−28.9 (−20.0)	−13.3 (8.1)	−5.6 (21.9)	−2.2 (28.0)	−5.0 (23.0)	−16.1 (3.0)	−26.1 (−15.0)	−37.2 (−35.0)	−48.3 (−54.9)	−50.0 (−58.0)
Record low wind chill	−59.2	−58.5	−49.7	−36.3	−20.5	−9.3	0.0	−4.8	−19.2	−30.9	−46.1	−58.4	−59.2
Average precipitation mm (inches)	15.3 (0.60)	9.4 (0.37)	19.7 (0.78)	24.1 (0.95)	51.4 (2.02)	70.9 (2.79)	66.9 (2.63)	44.8 (1.76)	32.8 (1.29)	24.5 (0.96)	14.2 (0.56)	15.7 (0.62)	389.7 (15.34)
Average rainfall mm (inches)	0.6 (0.02)	0.8 (0.03)	5.1 (0.20)	18.1 (0.71)	47.6 (1.87)	70.9 (2.79)	66.9 (2.63)	44.8 (1.76)	32.1 (1.26)	18.3 (0.72)	3.1 (0.12)	0.5 (0.02)	308.9 (12.16)
Average snowfall cm (inches)	19.4 (7.6)	11.4 (4.5)	18.8 (7.4)	6.9 (2.7)	3.6 (1.4)	0.0 (0.0)	0.0 (0.0)	0.0 (0.0)	0.7 (0.3)	6.9 (2.7)	13.0 (5.1)	19.5 (7.7)	100.2 (39.4)
Average precipitation days (≥ 0.2 mm)	10.9	8.3	9.3	8.5	10.9	13.5	10.8	9.5	8.9	8.1	8.3	10.9	117.9
Average rainy days (≥ 0.2 mm)	0.85	0.77	2.5	6.3	10.5	13.5	10.8	9.5	8.7	6.1	1.7	1.0	72.3
Average snowy days (≥ 0.2 cm)	11.7	8.8	8.5	3.3	0.96	0.04	0.0	0.0	0.52	2.7	8.2	11.7	56.2
Average relative humidity (%)	76.1	76.4	69.5	44.5	42.9	48.3	48.8	45.4	45.5	52.4	68.2	75.7	57.8
Mean monthly sunshine hours	96.1	133.5	154.5	236.6	262.4	277.7	325.4	287.4	198.1	163.3	97.9	85.4	2,318.2
Percentage possible sunshine	36.3	47.2	42.0	57.3	54.8	56.6	65.8	63.9	52.1	48.9	36.0	34.0	49.6
Source: Environment Canada

== Politics ==
Fairy Hill is a part of the federal riding of Moose Jaw-Lake Centre-Lanigan, which elected Conservative candidate Tom Lukiwski in 2015. In provincial politics, the hamlet is the Last Mountain-Touchwood riding, with Glen Hart, who has also won this riding the past 5 elections in a row, as the elected MLA. The area is situated mostly in the Rural Municipality of Longlaketon No. 219, while the rest is located in Lumsden No. 189. Delbert Schmidt is the current reeve of Longlaketon No. 219, and Kent Farago is the reeve of Lumsden No. 189.

== Fairy Hill Trails ==
The Fairy Hill Trails are located south of the Qu'Appelle River. The trails are home to many Geocaches and, as of 2017, can be walked virtually on Google Street View. The trails span 1,642 acres of grassland and parkland, and the area is a popular spot for local fishers, hunters, hikers, and bird watchers. Marshlands, known as the Fairy Hill Marsh, are located near the trails. The marshland provides habitat for shorebirds and migrating ducks and geese.

== See also ==
- List of communities in Saskatchewan
