= 2007 Canada Winter Games =

Games held in Whitehorse, Yukon

- 11th Canada Winter Games; 21st Canada Games
- Host city: Whitehorse, Yukon
- Country: Canada
- Opening: 23 February
- Closing: 10 March

Winter

The 2007 Canada Winter Games were held in Whitehorse, Yukon, from Friday 23 February 2007 to Saturday 10 March 2007. These were the first Canada Games held North of 60 (in the northern territories). The games were held concurrent with the Inuit Games and Dene Games. The Games were televised by CBC, SRC, TSN, RDS, and APTN.

== Opening ceremonies ==
The opening ceremonies were held on Friday 23 February 2007, at ATCO Place, a temporary tent structure built adjacent to the Yukon River for the Games. The ceremonies were aired on CBC and the First Nations Channel, broadcast in English, French, and Inuktituk. The national anthem was sung twice, first in T'chone and then in the usual mixed-language English and French (starting in English, then changing language verse by verse). The premiers of Yukon, Nunavut, Northwest Territories and Prime Minister Stephen Harper officially opened the games.

== Closing ceremonies ==
The closing ceremonies were conducted 10 March 2007 at ATCO Place with 3500 in attendance to watch entertainment and hear closing speeches. Jennifer Knight, a skier from the Yukon, handed a torch to Hilary Hansen, an athlete from Prince Edward Island, host province of the 2009 Canada Games.

== Venues ==
A total of ten venues were used.

Venue	Sport(s)
Better Bodies Centre	Squash
Canada Games Centre	Artistic Gymnastics; Badminton; Figure Skating; Hockey; Judo; Ringette; Short-track speed skating Synchronized Swimming; Table Tennis
École Émilie-Tremblay	Squash
F.H. Collins Secondary School	Boxing; Speed Skating; Traditional Games
Grey Mountain	Biathlon
Mount McIntyre Recreation Centre	Cross-country skiing Curling
Mt. Sima	Alpine Skiing; Freestyle Skiing; Snowboarding
Takhini Arena	Hockey; Ringette
Porter Creek Secondary School	Archery; Wheelchair Basketball
Vanier Catholic Secondary School	Fencing; Shooting

- Dene and Inuit sports were held as demonstration events.

== Medal standings ==
No province or territory was denied a medal in the final standings, an unprecedented occurrence for the Canada Games.

* Host nation ( Yukon)

Rank	Team	Gold	Silver	Bronze	Total
1	Quebec	52	36	34	122
2	Ontario	37	35	40	112
3	Alberta	24	29	26	79
4	British Columbia	24	24	29	77
5	Saskatchewan	9	13	15	37
6	Manitoba	4	12	19	35
7	New Brunswick	2	2	8	12
8	Prince Edward Island	1	0	3	4
8	Yukon*	1	0	3	4
10	Northwest Territories	1	0	0	1
11	Nova Scotia	0	3	4	7
12	Newfoundland and Labrador	0	1	2	3
13	Nunavut	0	0	1	1
Totals (13 entries)		155	155	184	494

Canada Games
Preceded by 2005 Canada Games	Canada Games; 2007	Succeeded by 2009 Canada Games
Preceded by 2003 Canada Winter Games	Canada Winter Games; 2007	Succeeded by 2011 Canada Winter Games
Preceded by 2001 Canada Summer Games	Canada Summer Games; 2005	Succeeded by 2009 Canada Summer Games
