= Rural Municipality of Big Quill No. 308 =

Rural municipality in Saskatchewan, Canada

Big Quill No. 308
- Rural municipality
- Rural Municipality of Big Quill No. 308
- Location of the RM of Big Quill No. 308 in Saskatchewan
- Coordinates: 51.678°N 104.342°W
- Country: Canada
- Province: Saskatchewan
- Census division: 10
- SARM division: 4
- Formed: December 13, 1909

Government
  - Reeve: Howie Linnen
  - Governing body: RM of Big Quill No. 308 Council
  - Administrator: Santana Dawson
  - Office location: Wynyard

Area (2016)
  - Land: 739.86 km^{2} (285.66 sq mi)

Population (2016)
  - Total: 519
  - Density: 0.7/km^{2} (1.8/sq mi)
- Time zone: CST
  - Summer (DST): CST
- Postal code: S0A 4T0
- Area codes: 306 and 639

The Rural Municipality of Big Quill No. 308 (2016 population: 519) is a rural municipality (RM) in the Canadian province of Saskatchewan within Census Division No. 10 and SARM Division No. 4. It is located in the east-central portion of the province.

== History ==
The RM of Big Quill No. 308 incorporated as a rural municipality on December 13, 1909.

There are two places on the Canadian Register of Historic Places in the RM of Big Quill:

- Amma's House on the Yellowhead Highway approximately 17 kilometres west of Wynyard was built by Icelandic carpenters in 1919.
- St. John Bohoslav Krasne Ukrainian Catholic Church approximately 20 kilometres south-east of Wynyard was built in 1940.

== Geography ==
=== Communities and localities ===
The following urban municipalities are surrounded by the RM.

Towns

- Wynyard

The following unincorporated communities are located within the RM.

Organized hamlets

- Kandahar

Special service areas

- Dafoe

Localities

- Copeland
- Krasne

== Demographics ==
Population history (1981–2016)
Year	Pop.	±%
1981	952	—
1986	892	−6.3%
1991	840	−5.8%
1996	748	−11.0%
2001	711	−4.9%
2006	635	−10.7%
2011	587	−7.6%
2016	519	−11.6%
Source: Statistics Canada via Saskatchewan Bureau of Statistics

In the 2021 Census of Population conducted by Statistics Canada, the RM of Big Quill No. 308 had a population of 520 living in 218 of its 246 total private dwellings, a change of −2.6% from its 2016 population of 534. With a land area of 730.34 km^{2} (281.99 sq mi), it had a population density of 0.7/km^{2} (1.8/sq mi) in 2021.

In the 2016 Census of Population, the RM of Big Quill No. 308 recorded a population of 519 living in 221 of its 263 total private dwellings, a −11.6% change from its 2011 population of 587. With a land area of 739.86 km^{2} (285.66 sq mi), it had a population density of 0.7/km^{2} (1.8/sq mi) in 2016.

== Government ==
The RM of Big Quill No. 308 is governed by an elected municipal council and an appointed administrator that meets on the second Wednesday of every month. The reeve of the RM is Howie Linnen while its administrator is Santana Dawson. The RM's office is located in Wynyard.

== See also ==
- List of communities in Saskatchewan
- List of historic places in Saskatchewan
