= Craven, Saskatchewan =

Village in Saskatchewan, Canada

Craven
- Village
- Village of Craven
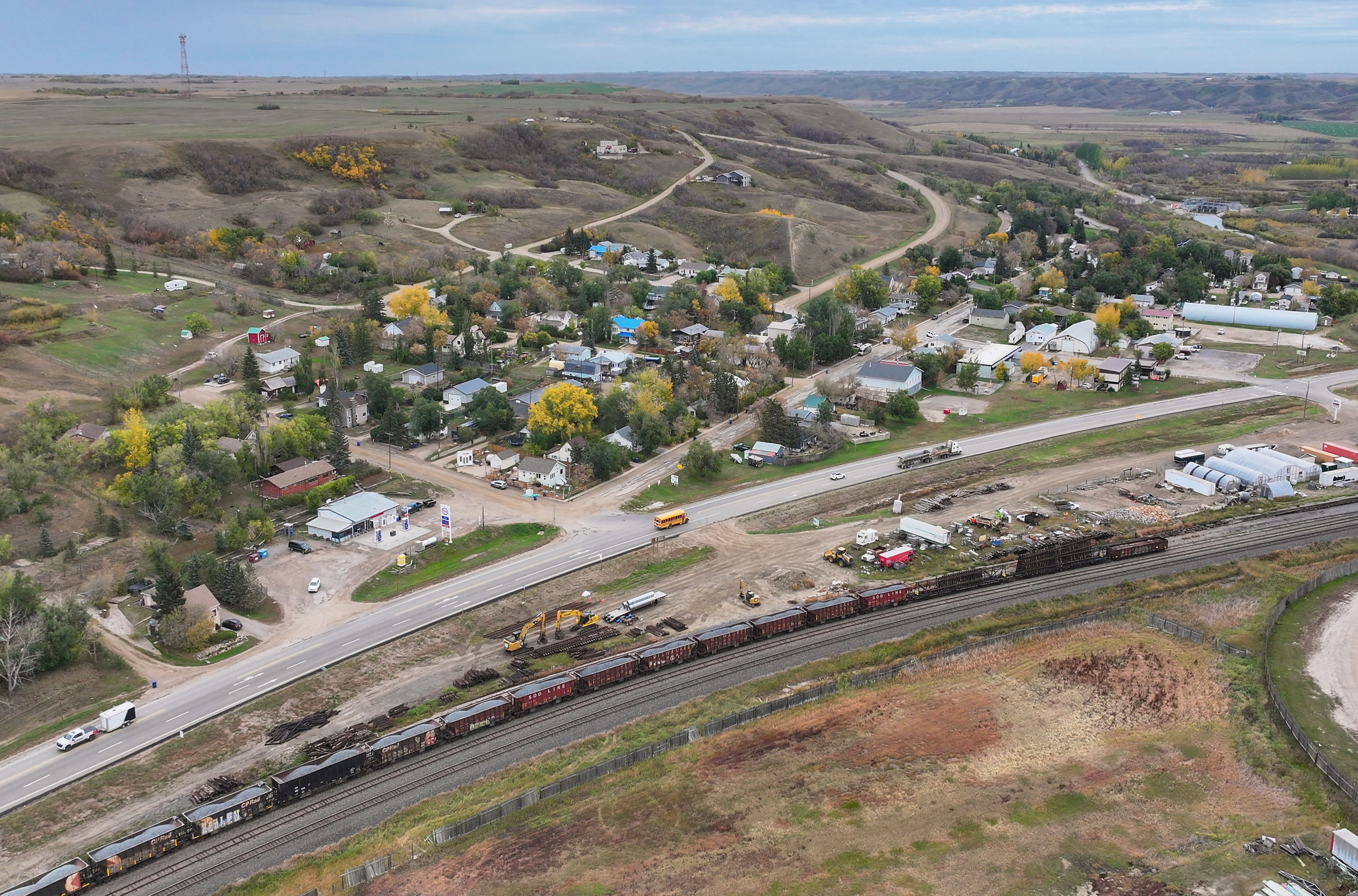

- Location within Saskatchewan Location within Canada
- Coordinates: 50°42′29″N 104°48′33″W
- Country: Canada
- Province: Saskatchewan
- Region: Central
- Census division: 6
- Rural Municipality: Longlaketon No. 219

Government
  - Type: Municipal
  - Governing body: Craven Village Council
  - Mayor: Dayna Anderson
  - Administrator: Sherry Beatty-Henfrey

Area
  - Land: 1.00 km^{2} (0.39 sq mi)

Population (2011)
  - Total: 214
  - Density: 176.7/km^{2} (458/sq mi)
- Time zone: UTC−06:00 (CST)
- Postal code: S0G 0W0
- Area codes: 306, 639, 474
- Highways: Highway 20; Highway 99 Highway 641
- Railways: Canadian Pacific Railway

Craven (2016 population: 214) is a village in the Canadian province of Saskatchewan within the Rural Municipality of Longlaketon No. 219 and Census Division No. 6. The village lies north-east of the town of Lumsden in the Qu'Appelle Valley. It sits at the confluence of the Qu'Appelle River and Last Mountain Creek. The Craven Dam is on the east side of the village.

Craven is host to an annual country music festival called Country Thunder Saskatchewan. Originally called the Big Valley Jamboree, it was first established by Father Lucien Larré as a fundraiser for his Bosco Homes for emotionally disturbed youth. A successor event, the Kinsmen Rock'N the Valley rock music festival, ran until 2004. The country music format was revived in 2005.

== History ==
Craven was founded in 1882 by Colonel Stone and was originally called Sussex. The original settlement was located a half a mile east from the present site. Craven incorporated as a village on April 11, 1905.

== Demographics ==
Population history (1981–2016)
Year	Pop.	±%
1981	206	—
1986	235	+14.1%
1991	267	+13.6%
1996	278	+4.1%
2001	264	−5.0%
2006	274	+3.8%
2011	234	−14.6%
2016	214	−8.5%
Source: Statistics Canada via Saskatchewan Bureau of Statistics

In the 2021 Census of Population conducted by Statistics Canada, Craven had a population of 266 living in 111 of its 118 total private dwellings, a change of 24.3% from its 2016 population of 214. With a land area of 1.22 km^{2} (0.47 sq mi), it had a population density of 218.0/km^{2} (564.7/sq mi) in 2021.

In the 2016 Census of Population, the Village of Craven recorded a population of 214 living in 92 of its 104 total private dwellings, a −9.3% change from its 2011 population of 234. With a land area of 1.21 km^{2} (0.47 sq mi), it had a population density of 176.9/km^{2} (458.1/sq mi) in 2016.

== Notable people ==
- Tanner Glass, a retired NHL ice hockey player

== See also ==
- List of communities in Saskatchewan
- List of villages in Saskatchewan
