= Grand Coulee, Saskatchewan =

Town in Saskatchewan, Canada

Grand Coulee
- Town
- Town of Grand Coulee
- Location within Sherwood No. 159 Location within Saskatchewan
- Coordinates: 50.431°N 104.823°W
- Country: Canada
- Province: Saskatchewan
- Census division: 6
- Rural Municipality: Sherwood
- Post office founded: February 1, 1903 (closed April 30, 1970)
- Village: February 15, 1984
- Town: October 26, 2016

Government
  - Mayor: Lee-Ann Ross
  - Administrator: Heather Hind
  - Governing body: Grand Coulee Town Council

Area
  - Total: 1.75 km^{2} (0.68 sq mi)
- Elevation: 560 m (1,840 ft)

Population (2016)
  - Total: 649
  - Density: 370.7/km^{2} (960/sq mi)
- Time zone: UTC-6 (CST)
- Postal code: S4M OA3
- Area codes: 306, 639
- Highways: Highway
- Website: Official website

Grand Coulee, is a town in the Canadian province of Saskatchewan. It is about 18 kilometres (11 mi) west of downtown Regina. It is home to an annual event called the "Harvest Hoedown”.

== Education ==
Grand Coulee is home to Stuart Nicks School, a Kindergarten to Grade 8 school. Stuart Nicks is part of the Prairie Valley School Division

== Demographics ==
Population history (1911–2021)
| Year | Pop. | ±% |
|---|---|---|
| 1911 | 82 | — |
| 1916 | 106 | +29.3% |
| 1986 | 218 | +105.7% |
| 1991 | 276 | +26.6% |
| 1996 | 336 | +21.7% |
| 2001 | 366 | +8.9% |
| 2006 | 435 | +18.9% |
| 2011 | 571 | +31.3% |
| 2016 | 649 | +13.7% |
| 2021 | 606 | −6.6% |
Source: Government of Canada

In the 2021 Census of Population conducted by Statistics Canada, Grand Coulee had a population of 606 living in 202 of its 209 total private dwellings, a change of −6.6% from its 2016 population of 649. With a land area of 1.74 km^{2} (0.67 sq mi), it had a population density of 348.3/km^{2} (902.0/sq mi) in 2021.

Canada census – Grand Coulee community profile

| | 2021 | 2016 |
| Population | 606 (-6.6% from 2016) | 649 (13.7% from 2011) |
| Land area | 1.74 km^{2} (0.67 sq mi) | 1.75 km^{2} (0.68 sq mi) |
| Population density | 348.1/km^{2} (902/sq mi) | 370.7/km^{2} (960/sq mi) |
| Median age | 36.0 (M: 36.4, F: 36.0) |
| Private dwellings | 209 (total) 202 (occupied) | 202 (total) |
| Median household income | $138,000 |

References: 2021 2016

== See also ==
- List of towns in Saskatchewan
- Sherwood Forest Bridge
