= Wascana Creek =

River in Saskatchewan, Canada

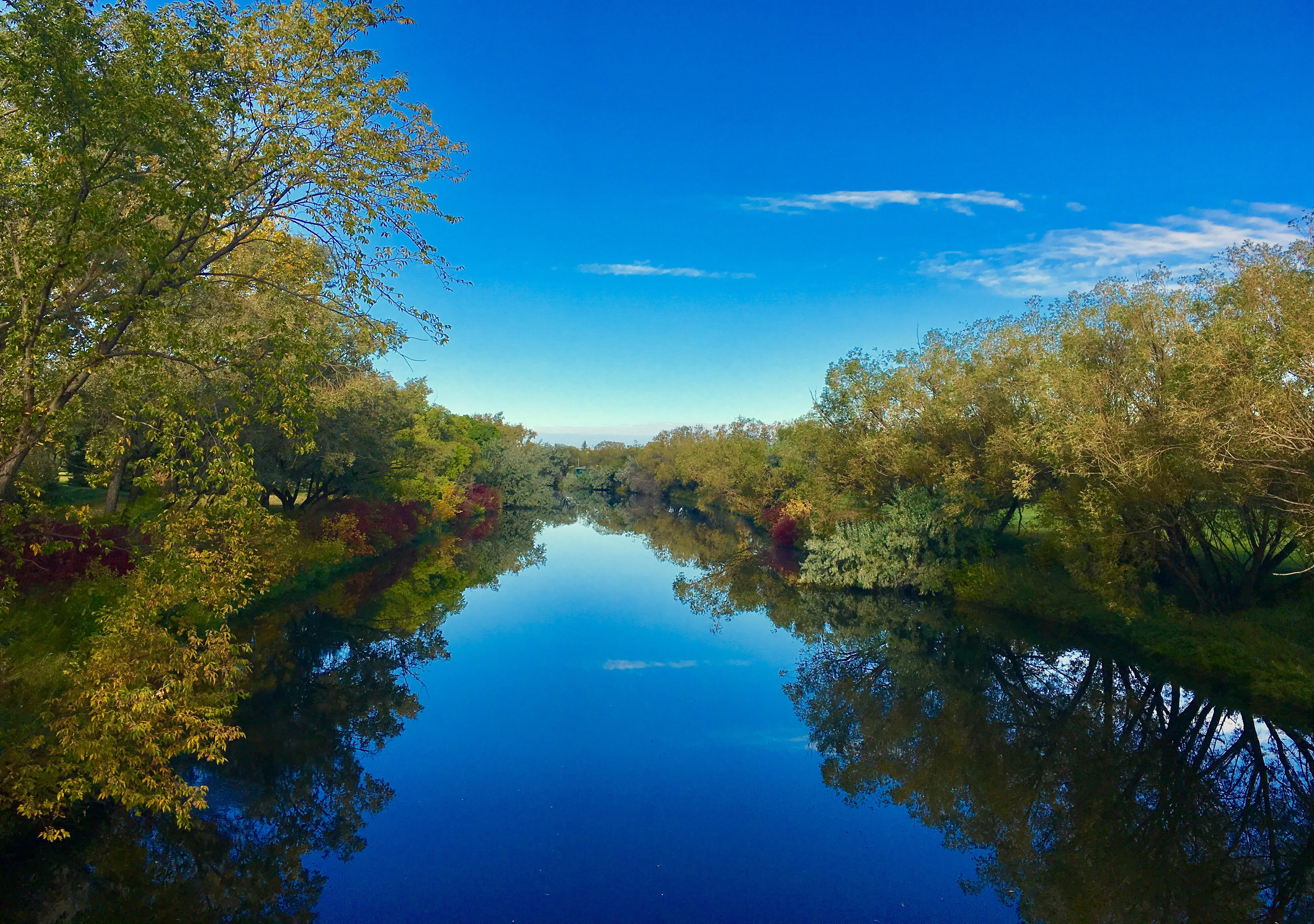
- Wascana Creek in Les Sherman Park, West End, downstream from the Albert Memorial Bridge and Wascana Lake

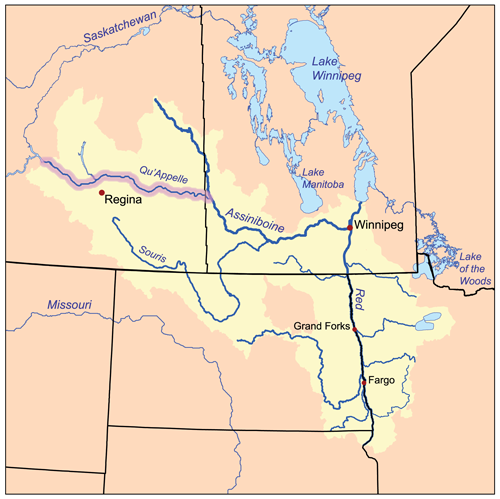
- The Red River drainage basin, with the Qu'Appelle River highlighted

Physical characteristics
- Source
  - coordinates: 50°39′00″N 104°55′02″W
- Mouth: Qu'Appelle River

Basin features
- River system: Red River
- Bridges: Albert Memorial Bridge and Sherwood Forest Bridge

Wascana Creek is a river in the Canadian province of Saskatchewan. It is a tributary of the Qu'Appelle River.

Originating in the fields east of Regina near Vibank, Wascana Creek travels south-east for approximately 45 kilometres (28 mi) before turning back west at Tyvan. The creek then travels in a north-westwardly direction following Highway 33 through Regina, where it was dammed by the Canadian Pacific Railway to create Wascana Lake. The lake was created to supply water for steam locomotives and to create a decorative image in Regina. Below the lake, the creek leaves Regina and ends at the Qu'Appelle River about 1 mile west of Lumsden.

Sherwood Forest Bridge and Albert Memorial Bridge are two of the bridges that cross Wascana Creek. Near the mouth of the river in the Wascana Valley, is a provincial recreation site called Wascana Trails that were developed for use in the 2005 Canada Summer Games.

A 2011 study by Environment Canada found the creek to have high levels of pollution.

== Wascana Creek Sub-basin ==
Wascana Creek Sub-basin is the name given to Wascana Creek's drainage basin. Along with the Moose Jaw River Watershed, it is one of four sub-basins that make up the Wascana & Upper Qu’Appelle Watersheds; the other three being the Last Mountain Lake Sub-basin, Upper Qu’Appelle Sub-basin, and Lanigan-Manitou Sub-basin. The four sub-basins plus Moose Jaw River drain a total of 23,443 km^{2} of land. The Craven Dam is located downstream from Wascana Creek's mouth on the Qu'Appelle River at the village of Craven.

Wascana Creek and its tributaries drain over 2,200 km^{2} of land. Several small tributaries feed the river, three of which are named:

- Manybone Creek
- Kronau Creek
- Cottonwood Creek

== Fish species ==
Brook stickleback and fathead minnow can be found in the Wascana Lake portion of the creek.

== See also ==
- List of rivers of Saskatchewan
- Hudson Bay drainage basin
