= Saskatchewan Highway 43 =

Provincial highway in Saskatchewan, Canada

Highway 43
- Highway 43 highlighted in red

Route information
- Maintained by Ministry of Highways and Infrastructure
- Length: 129.5 km (80.5 mi)

Major junctions
- West end: Highway 4 near Neville
- Highway 19 near Glenbain; Highway 58 at Gravelbourg
- East end: Highway 2 near Vantage

Location
- Country: Canada
- Province: Saskatchewan
- Rural municipalities: Lac Pelletier, Whiska Creek, Glen Bain, Gravelbourg, Sutton

Highway system
- Provincial highways in Saskatchewan
← Highway 42	→ Highway 44

Highway 43 is a provincial highway in the Canadian province of Saskatchewan. It runs from Highway 4 until Highway 2. The Highway is about 130 kilometres (81 mi) long. It passes through the town of Gravelbourg and crosses the Wood River.

== Route description ==
Highway 43 begins in the Rural Municipality of Lac Pelletier No. 107 at an intersection with Highway 4 just south of Blumenort, with the road continuing west towards Lac Pelletier as an unnamed Township Road. It heads east for a few kilometres to cross into the Rural Municipality of Whiska Creek No. 106, where it slowly winds its way southeast to travel along the south sides of Neville and Pambrun, where it has an intersection with Highway 628 and passes by the Millar College of the Bible. After crossing a railway line, the highway travels along the north side of Vanguard, where it has an intersection with Highway 609 and crosses Notukeu Creek, before heading due east, entering the Rural Municipality of Glen Bain No. 105 and travelling just to the north of Esme (access via Range Road 3092) on its way to share a short concurrency (overlap) with Highway 19 on the outskirts of Glenbain. Highway 43 now heads due eastward through rural farmland for several kilometres, entering the Rural Municipality of Gravelbourg No. 104 to have a short concurrency with Highway 610 before entering the town of Gravelbourg, where it travels along 1st Avenue W/E through neighbourhoods and a business district on the south side of town, passing by the town's hospital as well as College Mathieu and sharing a short concurrency with Highway 58. The road now leaves town and continues east, crossing the Wood River and entering into the Rural Municipality of Sutton No. 103 to have an intersection with Highway 627 and passes along the north sides of Palmer (access via Range Road 3094) and Mazenod, where it crosses Highway 608. After passing just to the north of Ettington, the highway comes to an end shortly thereafter at an intersection with Highway 2 between Vantage and Mossbank, with the road continuing east as Township Road 110. The entire length of Highway 43 is a paved, two-lane highway.

== Major intersections ==
From west to east:

Rural municipality	Location	km	mi	Destinations	Notes
Lac Pelletier No. 107		0.0	0.0	Highway 4 – Swift Current, Cadillac	
Whiska Creek No. 106	Neville	9.9	6.2	Range Road 3132	
Whiska Creek No. 106	Pambrun	22.3	13.9	Highway 628 south – Ponteix	West end of Hwy 628 concurrency
Whiska Creek No. 106	Pambrun	23.9	14.9	Highway 628 north – Braddock, Burnham	East end of Hwy 628 concurrency
Whiska Creek No. 106	Vanguard	34.1	21.2	Highway 609	
Glen Bain No. 105		58.7	36.5	Highway 19 north – Hodgeville	West end of Highway 19 concurrency
Glen Bain No. 105		62.0	38.5	Highway 19 south – Kincaid	East end of Highway 19 concurrency
Gravelbourg No. 104		76.7	47.7	Highway 610 north – Bateman	West end of Highway 610 concurrency
Gravelbourg No. 104		78.7	48.9	Highway 610 south – Woodrow	East end of Highway 610 concurrency
Gravelbourg No. 104	Gravelbourg	91.4	56.8	Highway 58 north – Chaplin	West end of Highway 58 concurrency
Gravelbourg No. 104	Gravelbourg	91.7	57.0	Highway 58 south – Lafleche	East end of Highway 58 concurrency
Sutton No. 103		104.4	64.9	Highway 627 north	Northwest of Palmer
Sutton No. 103		116.3	72.3	Highway 608 – Mazenod	
Sutton No. 103		129.5	80.5	Highway 2 – Moose Jaw, Assiniboia	Northwest of Vantage
1.000 mi = 1.609 km; 1.000 km = 0.621 mi: Concurrency terminus

== See also ==
- Transportation in Saskatchewan
- Roads in Saskatchewan
