= Saskatchewan Highway 58 =

Provincial highway in Saskatchewan, Canada

Highway 58
- Highway 58 highlighted in red

Route information
- Maintained by Ministry of Highways and Infrastructure
- Length: 130.5 km (81.1 mi)

Major junctions
- South end: Highway 18 near Fir Mountain
- Highway 13 at Lafleche; Highway 43 at Gravelbourg
- North end: Highway 1 (TCH) / Highway 19 at Chaplin

Location
- Country: Canada
- Province: Saskatchewan
- Rural municipalities: Waverley, Wood River, Gravelbourg, Shamrock, Chaplin

Highway system
- Provincial highways in Saskatchewan
← Highway 57	→ Highway 60

Highway 58 is a north–south provincial highway in the south-central part of the Canadian province of Saskatchewan. It begins at the Highway 1 / Highway 19 intersection at the village of Chaplin and heads south to Highway 18 about 3 kilometres (1.9 mi) west Fir Mountain near the northern slopes of the Wood Mountain Hills. The highway is about 130 km long, most of which is paved.

Highway 58 provides access to several communities, two regional parks, and the Western Hemisphere Shorebird Reserve Network at Chaplin Lake.

== Route description ==
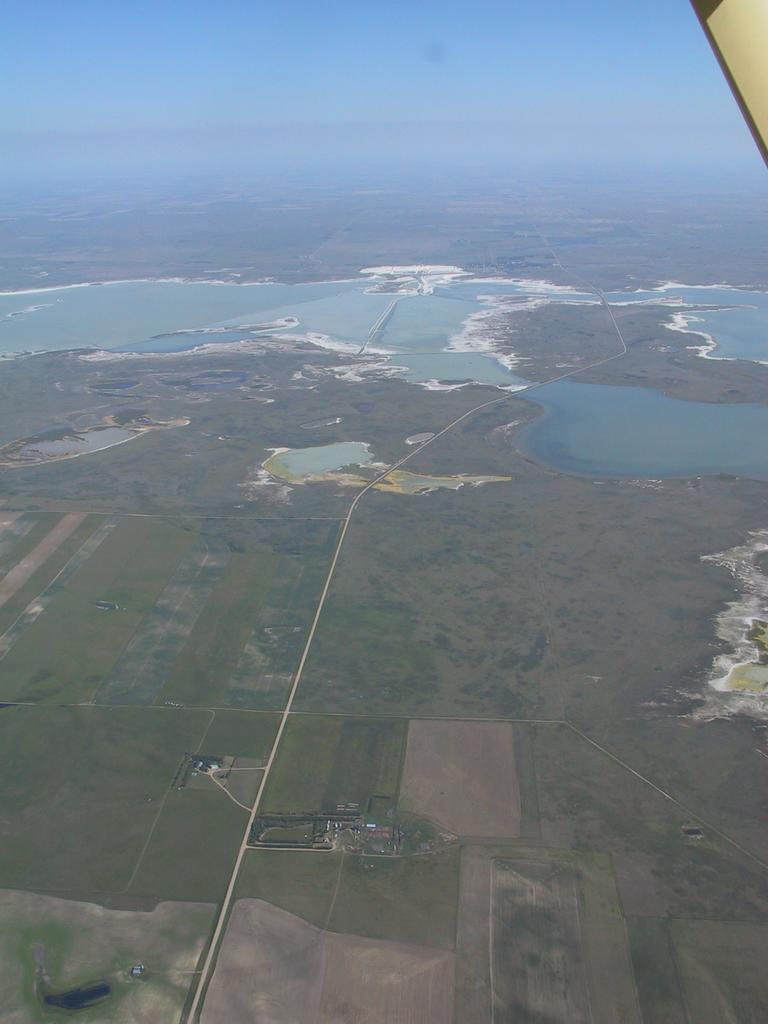
Aerial view of Highway 58 through Chaplin Lake

Highway 58's northern terminus is at the village of Chaplin and Highways 1 / 19. Highway 1 is part of the east–west Trans-Canada Highway while Highway 19 continues north to Lake Diefenbaker from the terminus of Highway 58. Highway 58 heads south from its northern terminus through Chaplin Lake and the Western Hemisphere Shorebird Reserve Network. The shorebird reserve is one of only three in Canada and the only one located inland. Chaplin Lake is the second largest salt water lake in Canada. The first 36 kilometres (22 mi) of Highway 58 en route to Shamrock is gravel. At Shamrock, Highway 58 begins a 5-kilometre (3.1 mi) eastward concurrency with Highway 363 before resuming its southerly routing. The remaining 94 kilometres (58 mi) of the highway from Shamrock to its southern terminus is paved.

From the concurrency with 363, Highway 58 heads south to Gravelbourg and the east–west Highway 43. After a 300-metre (980 ft) eastward concurrency with 43, Highway 58 resumes its southerly routing towards Lafleche and Highway 13. Along this stretch, the highway crosses the Wood River and provides access to Thomson Lake Regional Park and Shamrock Regional Park (via Highway 363). At Lafleche, Highway 58 has a 1.6-kilometre (1 mi) westward concurrency with 13 before turning back south en route to its southern terminus at Highway 18, about 3 kilometres (1.9 mi) west of Fir Mountain at the northern edge of the Wood Mountain Hills. The Wood Mountain Hills are part of the Missouri Coteau. The terrain of the Missouri Coteau features low hummocky, undulating, rolling hills, potholes, and grasslands.

== Attractions ==
Louis Pierre Gravel National Historic Site honours the arrival of the abbot Louis-Pierre Gravel, a missionary-colonizer and the Franco-Americans who settled Gravelbourg. The memorial site is located south of Highway 43 and just east of Highway 58.

Thomson Lake Regional Park is situated on Thomson Lake along Highway 58 near Lafleche. It is 81 hectares (200 acres) in size and hosts swimming lessons, camping, picnicking, boating, and golf. Thomson Lake Regional Park became the first regional park in the province of Saskatchewan.

Shamrock Regional Park is on the banks of Wood River. It is 22.3 hectares (55 acres) in size and has a campground, playground, and baseball diamonds.

Chaplin Lake is a saline lake at the north end of Highway 58. It has an area of 17,141 hectares (42,360 acres), which makes it the second largest saline lake in Canada. The lake is a haven for many varieties of shorebirds and is part of the Chaplin, Old Wives, and Reed Lake complex of the Western Hemisphere Shorebird Reserve Network.

The marker for Cripple Creek Provincial Historic Site is located at the junction of Highway 13 and Highway 58. Cripple Creek Crossing - North-West Mounted Police Camp Site is a municipal heritage site. This area encompasses 128 hectares (320 acres) and commemorates the history of the "March West" of the North-West Mounted Police under the command of George Arthur French on July 8, 1874.

== Major intersections ==
From south to north:

Rural municipality	Location	km	mi	Destinations	Notes
Waverley No. 44		0.0	0.0	Highway 18 – Wood Mountain, Rockglen, Mankota	West of Fir Mountain
Wood River No. 74		35.6	22.1	Highway 13 west (Red Coat Trail) – Kincaid	South end of Highway 13 concurrency
Wood River No. 74	Lafleche	37.2	23.1	Highway 13 east (Red Coat Trail) – Assiniboia, Weyburn	North end of Highway 13 concurrency
Gravelbourg No. 104	Gravelbourg	56.9	35.4	Highway 43 east – Vantage, Moose Jaw	South end of Highway 43 concurrency
Gravelbourg No. 104	Gravelbourg	57.2	35.5	Highway 43 west – Vanguard	North end of Highway 43 concurrency
Gravelbourg No. 104		70.2	43.6	Highway 718 east – Mossbank	South end of Highway 718 concurrency
Gravelbourg No. 104		71.8	44.6	Highway 718 west – Bateman	North end of Highway 718 concurrency
Shamrock No. 134		89.6	55.7	Highway 363 east – Moose Jaw	South end of Highway 363 concurrency; south end of unpaved section
Shamrock No. 134	Shamrock	94.5	58.7	Highway 363 west – Hodgeville	North end of Highway 363 concurrency
Chaplin No. 164	Chaplin	130.5	81.1	Highway 1 (TCH) – Swift Current, Moose Jaw, Regina; Highway 19 – Hodgeville, Central Butte	Continues as Highway 19 north
1.000 mi = 1.609 km; 1.000 km = 0.621 mi: Concurrency terminus

== See also ==
- Transportation in Saskatchewan
- Roads in Saskatchewan
