= Division No. 3, Saskatchewan =

Census division in Canada

Coordinates: 49°37′12″N 105°58′48″W

Division No. 3
- Census division in Saskatchewan
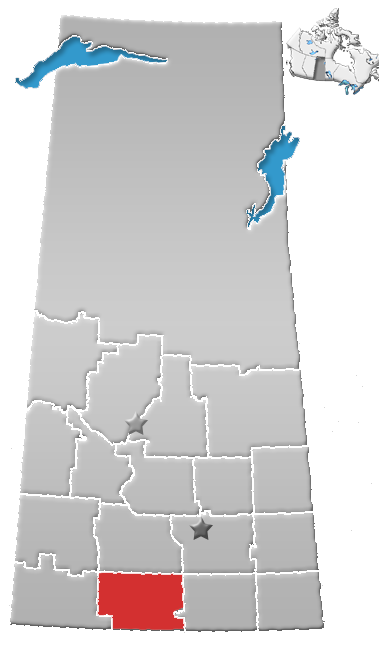
- Country: Canada
- Province: Saskatchewan

Area
  - Total: 18,553.99 km^{2} (7,163.74 sq mi)
- As of 2016

Population (2016)
  - Total: 12,610
  - Density: 0.6796/km^{2} (1.760/sq mi)

Division No. 3 is one of eighteen census divisions in the province of Saskatchewan, Canada, as defined by Statistics Canada. It is located in the south-southwestern part of the province, adjacent to the border with Montana, United States. The most populous community in this division is Assiniboia.

== Demographics ==
In the 2021 Census of Population conducted by Statistics Canada, Division No. 3 had a population of 12,262 living in 5,198 of its 6,186 total private dwellings, a change of −2.8% from its 2016 population of 12,610. With a land area of 18,319.12 km^{2} (7,073.05 sq mi), it had a population density of 0.7/km^{2} (1.7/sq mi) in 2021.

Knowledge of languages in Division No. 3 (1991−2021)
Language	2021		2011		2001		1991	
Language	Pop.	%	Pop.	%	Pop.	%	Pop.	%
English	11,500	99.31%	12,405	99.44%	14,485	99.35%	17,325	99.6%
French	1,080	9.33%	1,505	12.06%	2,065	14.16%	2,750	15.81%
German (Note: Combined responses of the High German languages, including Standard German, Pennsylvania German, Swiss German, and Yiddish.)	525	4.53%	255	2.04%	685	4.7%	765	4.4%
Spanish	160	1.38%	35	0.28%	10	0.07%	45	0.26%
Tagalog	90	0.78%	160	1.28%	20	0.14%	0	0%
Chinese (Note: Combined responses of the Chinese languages, including Mandarin, Cantonese, Min Nan, Hakka, Wu (Shanghainese), Min Dong, Chinese, n.o.s., and Chinese languages, n.i.e..)	90	0.78%	0	0%	0	0%	50	0.29%
Ukrainian	45	0.39%	35	0.28%	120	0.82%	190	1.09%
Dutch	35	0.3%	0	0%	30	0.21%	25	0.14%
Russian	30	0.26%	0	0%	20	0.14%	20	0.11%
Portuguese	20	0.17%	0	0%	10	0.07%	0	0%
Hindustani (Note: Combined responses of Hindi and Urdu as they form mutually intelligible registers of the Hindustani language.)	15	0.13%	0	0%	0	0%	0	0%
Polish	10	0.09%	25	0.2%	30	0.21%	55	0.32%
Italian	10	0.09%	0	0%	0	0%	25	0.14%
Greek	0	0%	0	0%	30	0.21%	0	0%
Hungarian	0	0%	0	0%	0	0%	35	0.2%
Vietnamese	0	0%	0	0%	0	0%	15	0.09%
Total responses	11,580	94.44%	12,475	98.3%	14,580	98.25%	17,395	98.68%
Total population	12,262	100%	12,691	100%	14,839	100%	17,628	100%

== Census subdivisions ==
The following census subdivisions (municipalities or municipal equivalents) are located within Saskatchewan's Division No. 3.

=== Towns ===
- Assiniboia
- Coronach
- Gravelbourg
- Lafleche
- Mossbank
- Ponteix
- Rockglen
- Willow Bunch

=== Villages ===
- Hazenmore
- Kincaid
- Limerick
- Mankota
- Neville
- Vanguard
- Wood Mountain

=== Rural municipalities ===
- RM No. 11 Hart Butte
- RM No. 12 Poplar Valley
- RM No. 42 Willow Bunch
- RM No. 43 Old Post
- RM No. 44 Waverley
- RM No. 45 Mankota
- RM No. 46 Glen McPherson
- RM No. 71 Excel
- RM No. 72 Lake of the Rivers
- RM No. 73 Stonehenge
- RM No. 74 Wood River
- RM No. 75 Pinto Creek
- RM No. 76 Auvergne
- RM No. 101 Terrell
- RM No. 102 Lake Johnston
- RM No. 103 Sutton
- RM No. 104 Gravelbourg
- RM No. 105 Glen Bain
- RM No. 106 Whiska Creek

=== Indian reserves ===
- Cowessess First Nation
  - Cowessess 73
- Sturgeon Lake First Nation
  - Sturgeon Lake 101C
- Wood Mountain Lakota First Nation
  - Wood Mountain 160

=== Other communities ===
- Aneroid
- Bateman
- Congress
- Crane Valley
- Ferland
- Fife Lake
- Flintoft
- Glentworth
- Killdeer
- Lafleche
- Mazenod
- Mccord
- Melaval
- Meyronne
- Ormiston
- Pambrun
- Scout Lake
- Spring Valley
- St. Victor
- Verwood
- Viceroy
- Woodrow

== See also ==
- List of census divisions of Saskatchewan
- List of communities in Saskatchewan
