= Neville, Saskatchewan =

Village in Saskatchewan, Canada

Neville
- Village
- Village of Neville
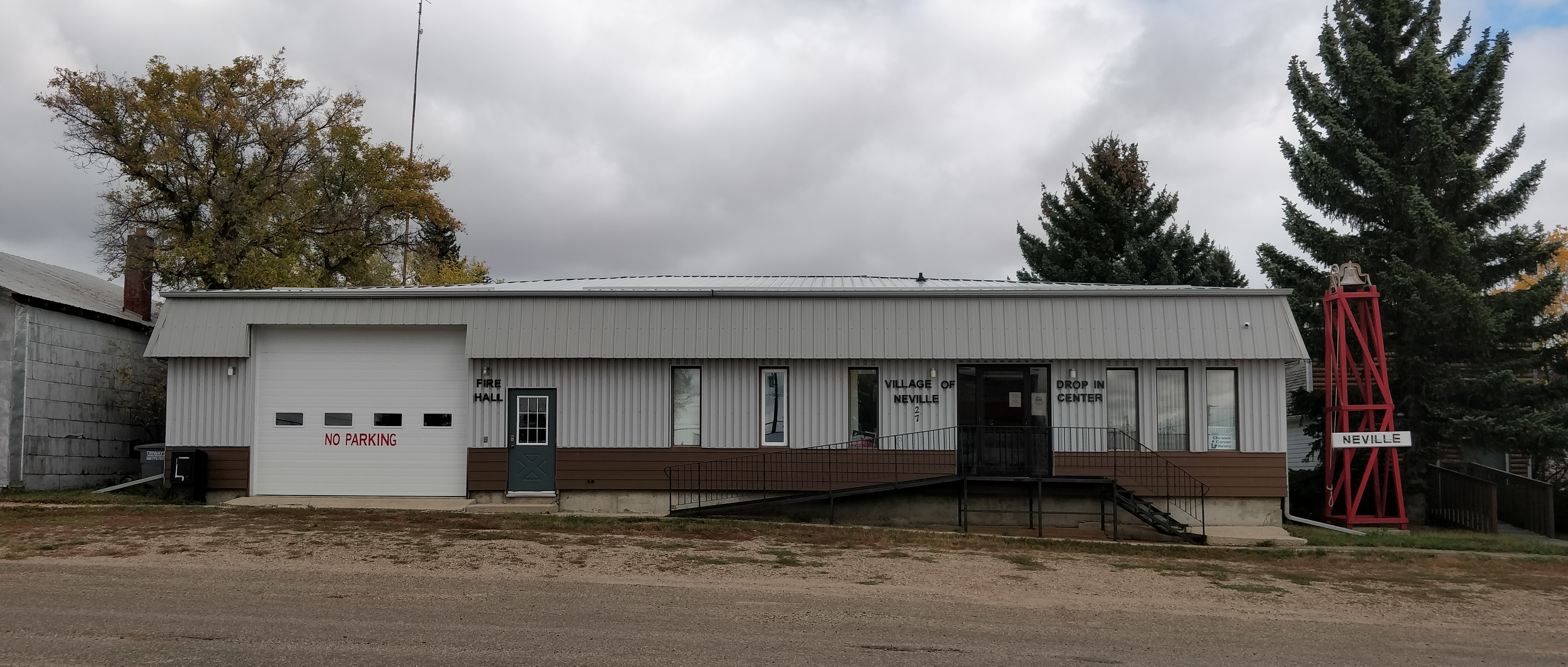
- Village office

- Location of Neville in Saskatchewan Neville (Canada)
- Coordinates: 49.971°N 107.673°W
- Country: Canada
- Region: Southwest
- Province: Saskatchewan
- Census division: No. 3
- Rural municipality: Whiska Creek No. 106

Government
  - Mayor: Nora McLearn
  - Councillor: Jennifer Cote
  - Councillor: Mary Ferris

Area
  - Total: 1.10 km^{2} (0.42 sq mi)

Population (2021)
  - Total: 88
  - Density: 91.7/km^{2} (238/sq mi)
- Time zone: CST
- Postal code: S0N 1T0
- Area code: 306
- Highways: Highway 43; Highway 4

Neville (2016 population: 87) is a village in the Canadian province of Saskatchewan within the Rural Municipality of Whiska Creek No. 106 and Census Division No. 3. It is located on Highway 43.

== History ==
Neville incorporated as a village on July 5, 1912.

== Demographics ==
Population history (1981–2016)
Year	Pop.	±%
1981	124	—
1986	100	−19.4%
1991	89	−11.0%
1996	88	−1.1%
2001	70	−20.5%
2006	65	−7.1%
2011	83	+27.7%
2016	87	+4.8%
Source: Statistics Canada via Saskatchewan Bureau of Statistics

In the 2021 Census of Population conducted by Statistics Canada, Neville had a population of 88 living in 37 of its 43 total private dwellings, a change of 1.1% from its 2016 population of 87. With a land area of 0.96 km^{2} (0.37 sq mi), it had a population density of 91.7/km^{2} (237.4/sq mi) in 2021.

In the 2016 Census of Population, the Village of Neville recorded a population of 87 living in 37 of its 41 total private dwellings, a 4.6% change from its 2011 population of 83. With a land area of 1.1 km^{2} (0.42 sq mi), it had a population density of 79.1/km^{2} (204.8/sq mi) in 2016.

== See also ==
- List of communities in Saskatchewan
- List of villages in Saskatchewan
