= Palmer, Saskatchewan =

Human settlement in Saskatchewan, Canada

Coordinates: 49°51′43″N 106°21′28″W

Palmer is a small unorganized hamlet located 15 kilometres (9.3 mi) east of the town of Gravelbourg in the Rural Municipality of Sutton No. 103, Saskatchewan, Canada. The population of Palmer fluctuates during the year, hovering in the double digits with peak population occurring in the summer months. The main reason of this spike is due to the efforts of the residents to establish Palmer as a venue for performing artists. In 2006 the hamlet had a population of 27 people. It previously held the status of village until January 1, 2002. Palmer lies just immediately to the southeast of the intersection between Highway 43 and Highway 627.

== History ==
Prior to January 1, 2002, Palmer was incorporated as a village, and was restructured as a hamlet under the jurisdiction of the RM of Sutton on that date.

== Demographics ==
In the 2021 Census of Population conducted by Statistics Canada, Palmer had a population of 20 living in 6 of its 7 total private dwellings, a change of 100% from its 2016 population of 10. With a land area of 2.47 km^{2} (0.95 sq mi), it had a population density of 8.1/km^{2} (21.0/sq mi) in 2021.

== History of the church ==
The prominent structure in Palmer is St. Oliver's Catholic Church which closed its doors in 1970. Eventually purchased by Mr. Bowler from his grandfather's estate, the building became simply known as "The Church".

The first mass was held by Father Gravel on May 17, 1914 and in the spirit of historical recognition, the residents of Palmer held a Centennial Celebration on May 17, 2014, highlighted by a music festival with the main stage located within the church.

== See also ==
- List of communities in Saskatchewan
- List of hamlets in Saskatchewan
