= Woodrow, Saskatchewan =

Community in Saskatchewan, Canada

Woodrow
- Unincorporated community
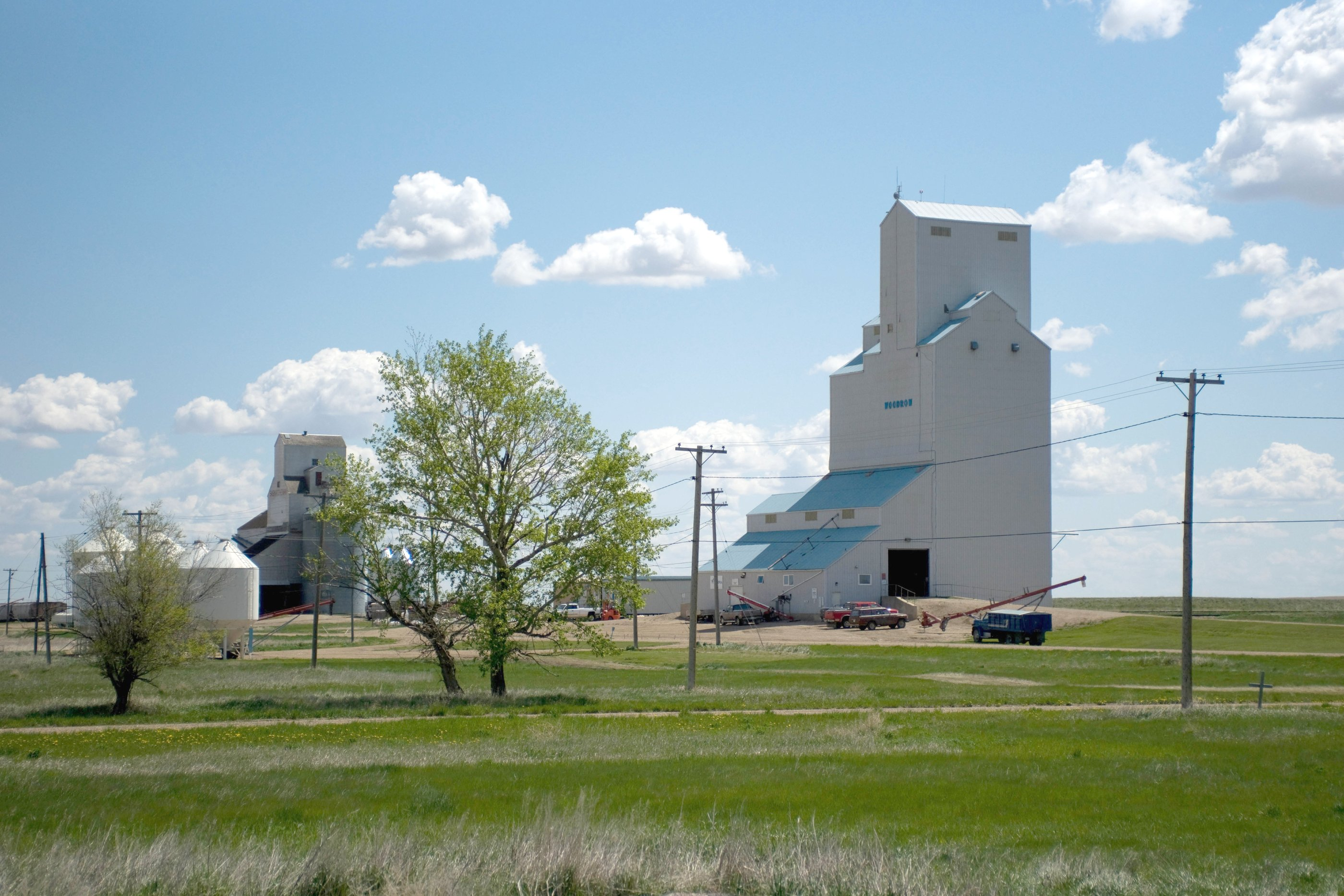
- Woodrow grain elevators

- Location of Woodrow in Saskatchewan Woodrow (Canada)
- Coordinates: 49°42′00″N 106°43′02″W
- Country: Canada
- Province: Saskatchewan
- Census division: 3
- Rural Municipality: Wood River No. 74
- Post office Founded: 1909-06-01
- Incorporated (Village): N/A
- Dissolved: March 21, 2002

Government
  - Governing body: RM of Wood River

Area
  - Total: 0.42 km^{2} (0.16 sq mi)

Population (2021)
  - Total: 20
  - Density: 11.9/km^{2} (31/sq mi)
- Time zone: CST
- Postal code: S0H 4M0
- Area code: 306
- Highways: Highway 13 (Red Coat Trail / Ghost Town Trail) / Highway 610
- Waterways: Thomson Lake

Woodrow is an unincorporated community in the Canadian province of Saskatchewan approximately 6 miles west of Lafleche. This present day agricultural area was once the hub of the local area with lumber yards, grain elevators, three churches and three or more general stores. The village was formally dissolved on March 21, 2002, and is now administered by the surrounding Rural Municipality of Wood River No. 74.

== Demographics ==
In the 2021 Census of Population conducted by Statistics Canada, Woodrow had a population of 20 living in 6 of its 6 total private dwellings, a change of −65.5% from its 2016 population of 58. With a land area of 0.54 km^{2} (0.21 sq mi), it had a population density of 37.0/km^{2} (95.9/sq mi) in 2021.

== Transportation ==
Saskatchewan Transportation Company provided intercity bus service until the end of May, 2017, when service was discontinued.

== Churches ==
The Woodrow Gospel Chapel began service in 1909 by George Reimche, and was based on immigrants from North Dakota when the community was originally known as Hoffnungsfeld.

== Climate ==
Climate data for Woodrow (1981-2010, possibly inaccurate)
Month	Jan	Feb	Mar	Apr	May	Jun	Jul	Aug	Sep	Oct	Nov	Dec	Year
Record high °C (°F)	—	7.0 (44.6)	23.0 (73.4)	22.0 (71.6)	29.0 (84.2)	31.0 (87.8)	43.0 (109.4)	36.5 (97.7)	34.5 (94.1)	26.0 (78.8)	15.0 (59.0)	7.0 (44.6)	43.0 (109.4)
Mean daily maximum °C (°F)	—	−7.0 (19.4)	—	—	19.4 (66.9)	—	32.9 (91.2)	28.9 (84.0)	20.3 (68.5)	15.0 (59.0)	3.8 (38.8)	—	—
Daily mean °C (°F)	—	−12.3 (9.9)	—	—	11.5 (52.7)	—	23.0 (73.4)	19.4 (66.9)	12.2 (54.0)	7.8 (46.0)	−2.1 (28.2)	—	—
Mean daily minimum °C (°F)	—	−17.4 (0.7)	—	—	3.9 (39.0)	—	13.3 (55.9)	9.8 (49.6)	4.3 (39.7)	0.1 (32.2)	−8.0 (17.6)	—	—
Record low °C (°F)	—	−36.0 (−32.8)	−23.0 (−9.4)	−15.0 (5.0)	−6.0 (21.2)	4.0 (39.2)	6.0 (42.8)	0.5 (32.9)	−3.0 (26.6)	−13.0 (8.6)	−23.0 (−9.4)	−29.0 (−20.2)	−36.0 (−32.8)
Average precipitation mm (inches)	17.1 (0.67)	9.1 (0.36)	18.0 (0.71)	18.9 (0.74)	56.3 (2.22)	77.1 (3.04)	56.1 (2.21)	34.5 (1.36)	33.7 (1.33)	19.0 (0.75)	15.1 (0.59)	11.5 (0.45)	366.4 (14.43)
Source: Environment Canada

== See also ==
- List of communities in Saskatchewan
