= Vanguard, Saskatchewan =

Vanguard
- Village
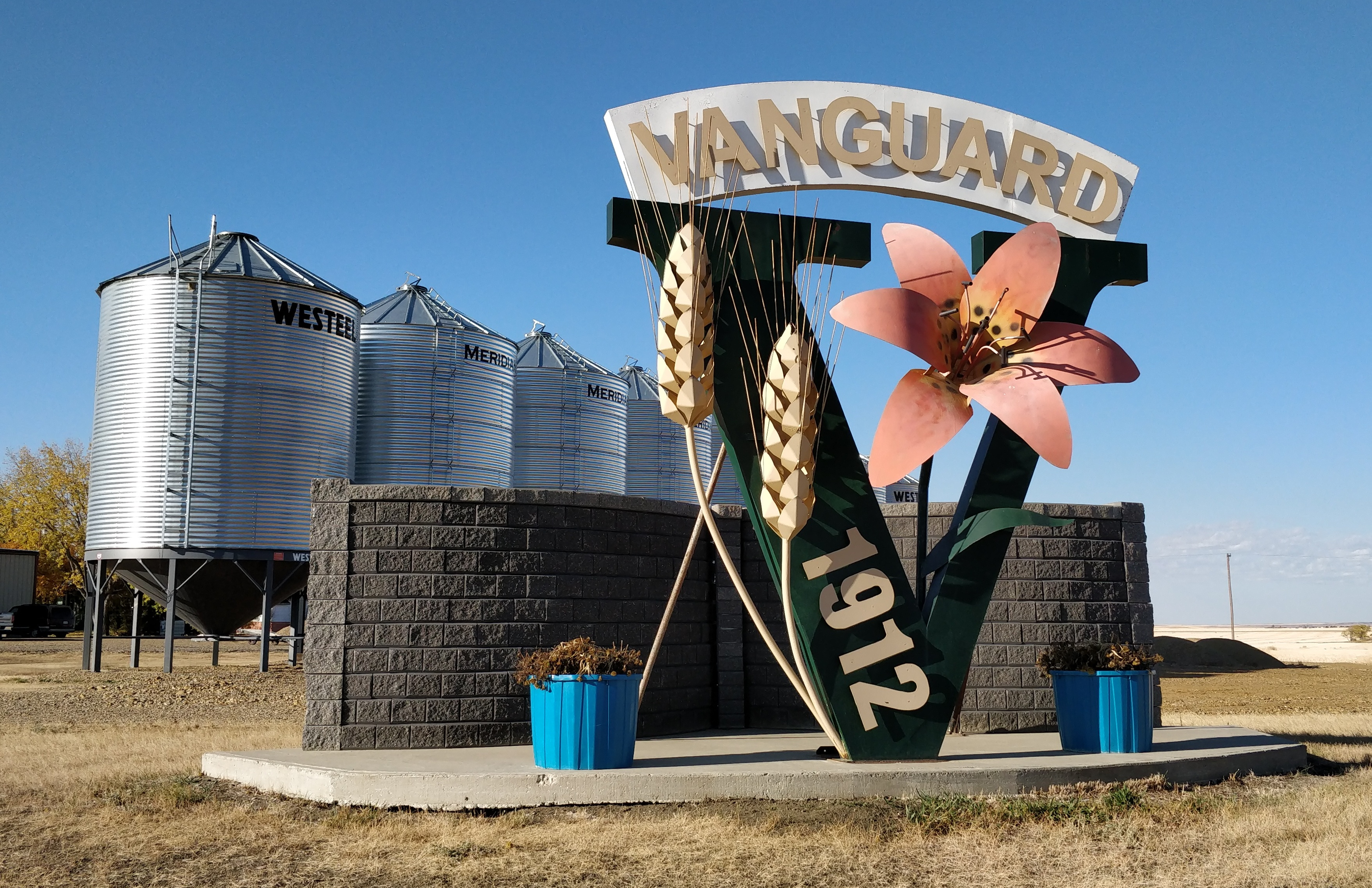
- Monument at entrance to town
- Motto: A Proud Past & A Promising Future
- Location within Whiska Creek No. 106 Location within Saskatchewan
- Coordinates: 49.909°N 107.257°W
- Country: Canada
- Province: Saskatchewan
- Rural municipality: Whiska Creek No. 106
- Post office Founded: N/A
- Village Incorporated: 1912
- Town Incorporated: N/A

Government
  - Mayor: Kevin Hames
  - Village Administrator: Melanie Clark
  - Governing body: Vanguard Village Council

Area
  - Total: 1.86 km^{2} (0.72 sq mi)

Population (2016)
  - Total: 134
  - Density: 100.4/km^{2} (260/sq mi)
- Time zone: CST
- Postal code: S0N 2V0
- Area code: 306
- Highways: Highway 43 / Highway 609
- Railways: Great Western Railway
- Website: Vanguard, Saskatchewan

Vanguard (2016 population: 134) is a village in the Canadian province of Saskatchewan within the Rural Municipality of Whiska Creek No. 106 and Census Division No. 3. It is on Highway 43 close to Notukeu Creek. Its prime economic driver is agriculture: chick peas; lentils; red, spring, hard and durum wheats are grown here.

== History ==
In 1910, the Canadian Pacific Railway purchased the land that became the community of Vanguard from Latimer Young. Vanguard incorporated as a village on July 8, 1912. The origin of the name Vanguard may be attributed to it having been on the vanguard of the railway in 1912; however, Vanguard is also a name in the Royal Navy tradition. Lord Horatio Nelson had a Vanguard; the last dreadnought battleship (scrapped in 1960) was also called Vanguard. Recent publications state that the inspiration for the name of the village came from HMS Vanguard which was commissioned in 1909 and exploded in 1917, killing 843 of the 845 men aboard. Regardless of the true origin of the name, the north–south streets in Vanguard reflect the naval heritage, being named Armada, Victory, Triumph, Drake and Nelson Streets. The east–west streets are named in honour of the province (Saskatchewan Avenue), the landscape in which Vanguard is situated (Prairie Avenue), the rail heritage (Railway Avenue) and the hopeful spirit in which Vanguard was established (Progress Avenue). Vanguard is bisected by Division St. and the main street is called "Dominion".

== Demographics ==
Population history (1981–2016)
| Year | Pop. | ±% |
|---|---|---|
| 1981 | 292 | — |
| 1986 | 279 | −4.5% |
| 1991 | 249 | −10.8% |
| 1996 | 207 | −16.9% |
| 2001 | 187 | −9.7% |
| 2006 | 152 | −18.7% |
| 2011 | 152 | +0.0% |
| 2016 | 134 | −11.8% |
Source: Statistics Canada via Saskatchewan Bureau of Statistics

In the 2021 Census of Population conducted by Statistics Canada, Vanguard had a population of 184 living in 71 of its 84 total private dwellings, a change of 37.3% from its 2016 population of 134. With a land area of 1.86 km^{2} (0.72 sq mi), it had a population density of 98.9/km^{2} (256.2/sq mi) in 2021.

In the 2016 Census of Population, the Village of Vanguard recorded a population of 134 living in 64 of its 86 total private dwellings, a −13.4% change from its 2011 population of 152. With a land area of 1.86 km^{2} (0.72 sq mi), it had a population density of 72.0/km^{2} (186.6/sq mi) in 2016.

== Attractions ==
Nearby communities are Pambrun (home of Millar College of the Bible), Gravelbourg (renowned for its French heritage and cathedral), Swift Current (the regional "headquarters"), Hodgeville ("home" of the Saskatchewan flag) and Ponteix (close to Notekeu Regional Park). Vanguard is close to Cypress Hills inter-provincial park, Grasslands National Park, the Canada–US border, and Lac Pelletier Regional Park.

== Education ==
Vanguard is the home of Vanguard Community School with specialist teachers, low student-teacher ratio, and an enrollment of approximately 100.

== Notable people ==
Author, broadcaster, and journalist James Minifie (1900–1974) called Vanguard home. He worked for the New York Herald Tribune and was the Washington correspondent for the CBC. Knowlton Nash described Mr. Minifie as: "a man passionately dedicated to improving the quality of journalism [whose] overwhelming desire was accuracy in reporting". Woodrow Lloyd, former premier of Saskatchewan, was a principal in Vanguard. NHL goaltender, Al Rollins, was born in Vanguard.

== See also ==
- List of communities in Saskatchewan
- List of francophone communities in Saskatchewan
