= Gravelbourg Ecclesiastical Buildings =

National Historic Site of Canada

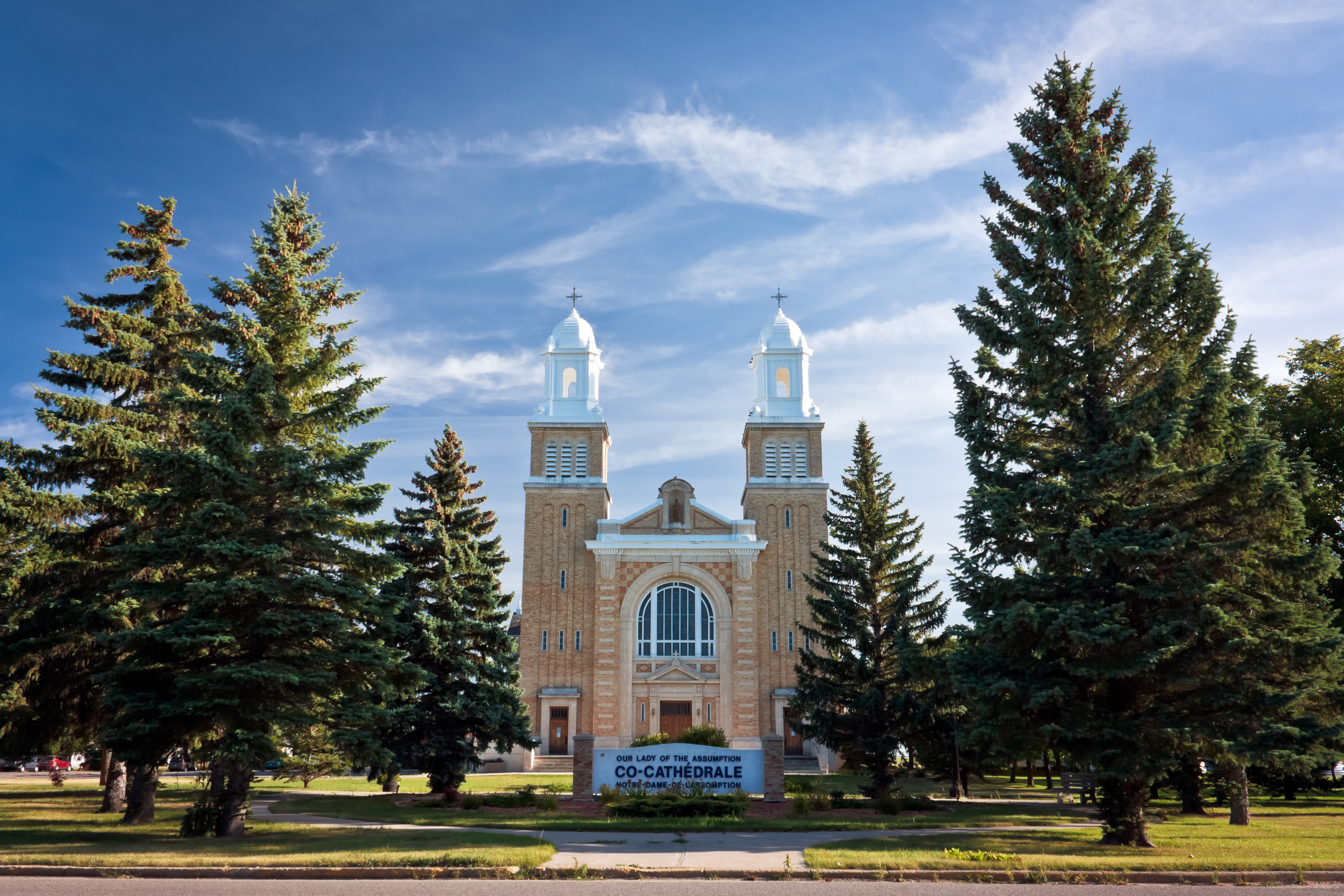
- Interactive map of the Gravelbourg Ecclesiastical Buildings area

General information
- Architectural style: Classical Revival
- Location: Gravelbourg, Saskatchewan, Canada
- Coordinates: 49°52′20.6″N 106°33′26.3″W
- Construction started: 1917
- Completed: 1919 (additions in 1927)

Design and construction
- Architect: Joseph-Ernest Fortin

National Historic Site of Canada
- Official name: Gravelbourg Ecclesiastical Buildings
- Designated: 1995

The Gravelbourg Ecclesiastical Buildings are a National Historic Site of Canada consisting of a cathedral (Our Lady of Assumption Co-Cathedral), bishop's residence, and convent.

== History ==
The buildings were constructed by Joseph-Ernest Fortin, an architect from Montreal. The convent and bishop's residence were constructed in 1917 and 1918, respectively, with the cathedral itself constructed between 1918 and 1919. Later additions were made to the convent in 1927. Gravelbourg was founded by Louis-Pierre Gravel on behalf of the Catholic Church in order to encourage French settlement in Saskatchewan. Its position as the centre of Franco-Saskatchewanian settlement led to the establishment of the Roman Catholic Diocese of Gravelbourg in 1930. Despite the suppression of the diocese in 1998, the cathedral's significance is reflected in its status as co-cathedral of the Roman Catholic Archdiocese of Regina.

The buildings were designated a National History Site of Canada in 1995 due to its significance in the history of French Canadian colonization.
