= Louis-Pierre Gravel =

- Born: Louis-Joseph-Cyriaque Gravel; August 8, 1868; Stanfold, Quebec (Princeville)
- Died: February 10, 1926 (aged 57); Montreal, buried in Gravelbourg, Saskatchewan
- Other name: Pietro
- Education: Séminaire de Trois-Rivières; Séminaire de Nicolet; Grand Séminaire de Montréal
- Occupation: ordained priest 1892-08-28
- Known for: Saskatchewan colonizer

Louis-Pierre Gravel was a French-Canadian missionary and colonizer who founded the town of Gravelbourg in Saskatchewan, Canada. He was born in Stanfold (now called Princeville), Quebec, on August 8, 1868, and was ordained as a priest on August 28, 1892, after finishing his studies at seminaries in Trois-Rivières, Nicolet and Montreal, Quebec. After serving in parishes in New York City from 1892 to 1906, he was asked to found a French-Canadian parish in the south-west of Saskatchewan. In 1906, he founded the town of Gravelbourg. Aiding him in his endeavours were five of his brothers, Henri and Maurice, both doctors; Alphonse and Emile, both lawyers; Guy, a pharmacist; plus a sister, Laurianne, the wife of Georges Hébert, also a lawyer. He persuaded many French-Canadian Catholics to settle in the Gravelbourg, Lafleche, Mazenod, and Meyronne block settlement. Gravel died in Montreal on February 10, 1926, and was buried in Gravelbourg.

== Legacy ==
Louis-Pierre Gravel was designated a person of national historic significance in 1956. The inscription on a monument in Gravelbourg built in 1958 to honour him reads:

"Between 1906 and 1926 more than ten thousand Canadian citizens, many of whom were then living in the United States, answered the call of Reverend Louis-Pierre Gravel to make their homes on the broad plains of Saskatchewan where they built towns and established French-speaking cultural institutions." Parks Canada
