= Rural Municipality of Waverley No. 44 =

Rural municipality in Saskatchewan, Canada

Waverley No. 44
- Rural municipality
- Rural Municipality of Waverley No. 44
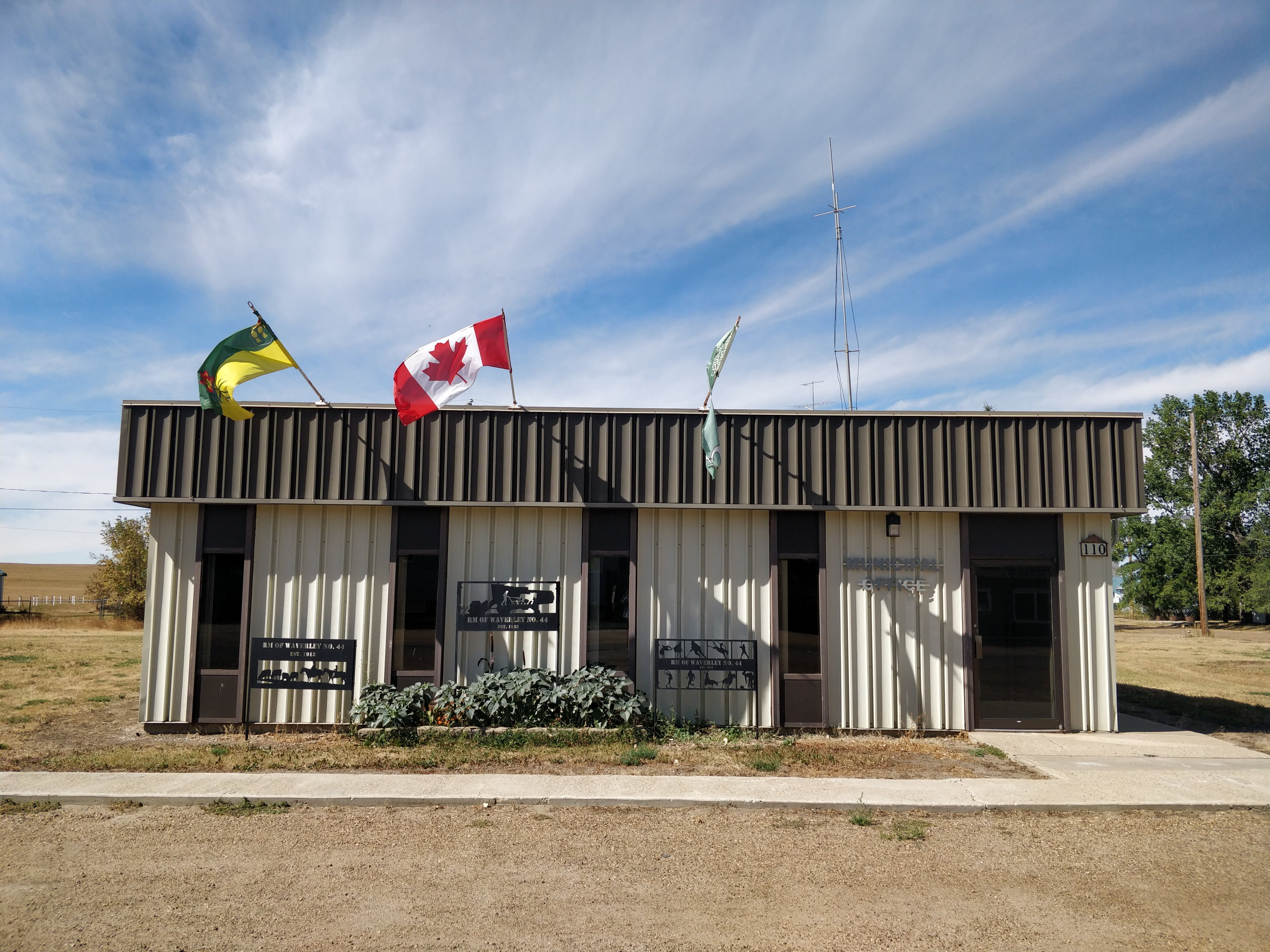
- R.M. office in Glentworth

- Location of the RM of Waverley No. 44 in Saskatchewan
- Coordinates: 49.275°N 106.568°W
- Country: Canada
- Province: Saskatchewan
- Census division: 3
- SARM division: 2
- Federal riding: Cypress Hills—Grasslands
- Provincial riding: Wood River
- Formed: February 1, 1913

Government
  - Reeve: Lloyd Anderson
  - Governing body: RM of Waverley No. 44 Council
  - Administrator: Stacey Poirer
  - Office location: Glentworth

Area (2016)
  - Land: 1,429.3 km^{2} (551.9 sq mi)

Population (2016)
  - Total: 336
  - Density: 0.2/km^{2} (0.52/sq mi)
- Time zone: CST
  - Summer (DST): CST
- Postal code: S0H 1V0
- Area codes: 306 and 639

The Rural Municipality of Waverley No. 44 (2016 population: 336) is a rural municipality (RM) in the Canadian province of Saskatchewan within Census Division No. 3 and SARM Division No. 2. Located in the southwest portion of the province, it is adjacent to the United States border, neighbouring Valley County in Montana.

== History ==
The RM of Waverley No. 44 incorporated as a rural municipality on February 1, 1913.

== Geography ==
=== Communities and localities ===
The following unincorporated communities are within the RM.

Localities

- Fir Mountain
- Glentworth
- Wood Mountain

== Demographics ==
Population history (1981–2016)
Year	Pop.	±%
1981	498	—
1986	468	−6.0%
1991	416	−11.1%
1996	428	+2.9%
2001	444	+3.7%
2006	422	−5.0%
2011	359	−14.9%
2016	336	−6.4%
Source: Statistics Canada via Saskatchewan Bureau of Statistics

In the 2021 Census of Population conducted by Statistics Canada, the RM of Waverley No. 44 had a population of 295 living in 127 of its 143 total private dwellings, a change of −12.2% from its 2016 population of 336. With a land area of 1,425.78 km^{2} (550.50 sq mi), it had a population density of 0.2/km^{2} (0.5/sq mi) in 2021.

In the 2016 Census of Population, the RM of Waverley No. 44 recorded a population of 336 living in 143 of its 160 total private dwellings, a −6.4% change from its 2011 population of 359. With a land area of 1,429.3 km^{2} (551.9 sq mi), it had a population density of 0.2/km^{2} (0.6/sq mi) in 2016.

== Attractions ==
The RM includes the eastern portion (or "East Block") of Grasslands National Park.

== Government ==
The RM of Waverley No. 44 is governed by an elected municipal council and an appointed administrator that meets on the second Tuesday of every month. The reeve of the RM is Lloyd Anderson while its administrator is Deidre Nelson. The RM's office is located in Glentworth.

== See also ==
- List of rural municipalities in Saskatchewan
