= The Grasslands Project =

2016 short documentary series

The Grasslands Project is a 2016 series of 10 short documentary films about small rural communities in southern Alberta and Saskatchewan, directed by Scott Parker and produced by David Christensen for the National Film Board of Canada (NFB).

== Development and production ==
Christensen, head of the NFB's Northwest Studio in Edmonton, had developed the idea for a series of short films that would tell the stories of small communities in Canada's southern Prairie grasslands. To direct the project, he hired Alberta filmmaker Scott Parker, with whom he had previously worked on the NFB's Stories from Our Land project. In February 2015, Christensen and Parker travelled to rural communities for a series of 10 public meetings to identify the key themes and concerns of local residents.

Parker stated in May 2016 interview that he worked every day for six or seven months, shooting, travelling as well as editing. On one occasion, he made an 800-kilometre round trip to screen one of the films for a participant. Altogether, he calculated that he travelled 30,000 km. in the summer of 2015 to complete the films.

== Films ==
The Alberta films were shot in or nearby Coutts, Magrath and Foremost. Saskatchewan’s locations were Eastend, Val Marie, Gravelbourg, Wood Mountain, Rockglen—as well as Radville, for the short film Generations, about the passing on of a family farm in nearby Ceylon, Saskatchewan.

=== Titles ===
- A Rancher’s View, about a ranching family in Fir Mountain, Saskatchewan who manage their grazing lands in an environmentally sustainable way.
- No Other Place, about local arts communities in the region
- Homecoming
- Life Out Here, a documentary about women farmers.
- The Last One and Population 21, two films about declining rural populations
- Generations
- Val Marie Hotel
- After the Fire
- Les Fransaskois

From May 6 to 14, 2016, the films had their world premieres in the communities where they were filmed.
