= Thomson Lake =

Lake in Saskatchewan, Canada

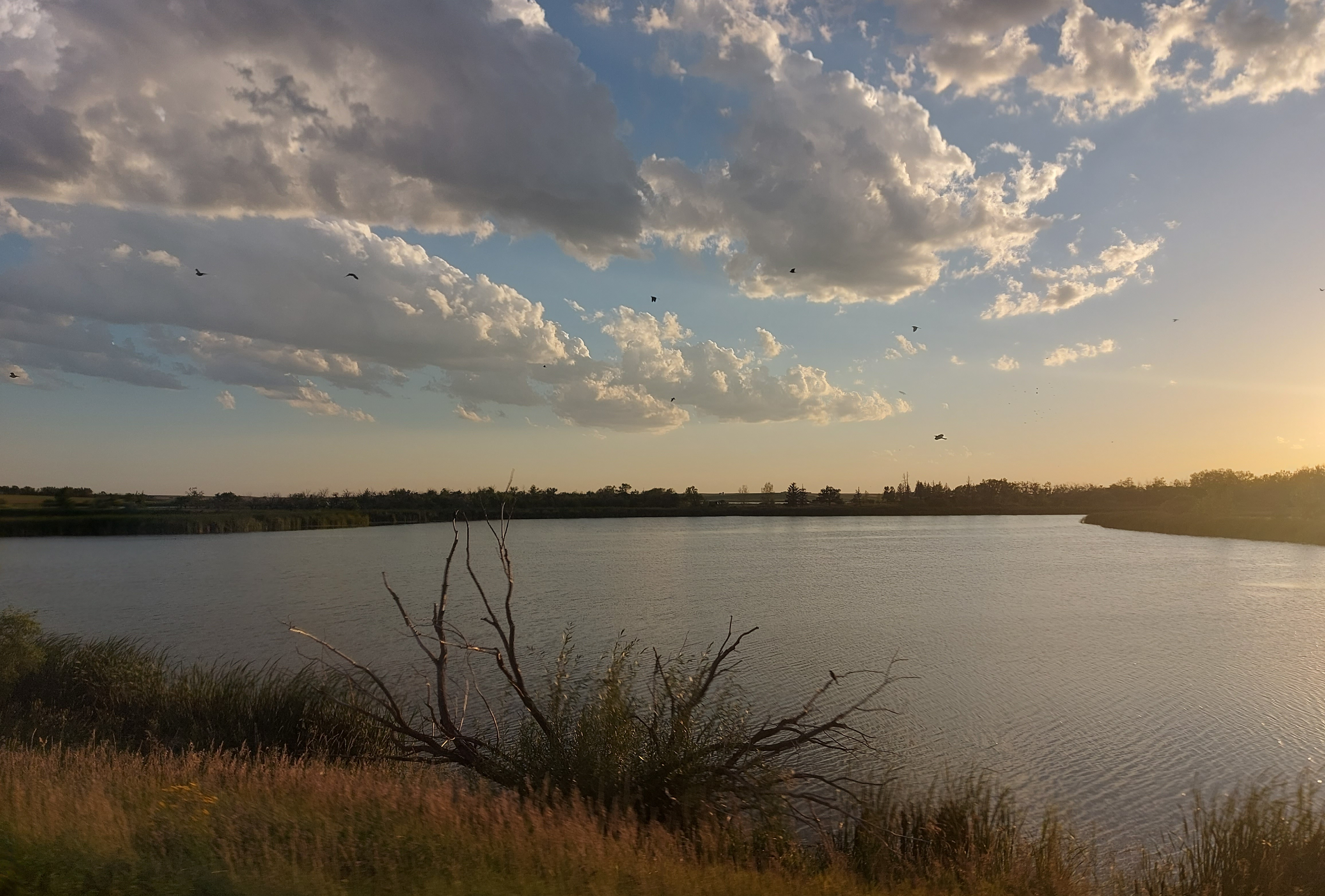
- Thomson Lake

- Location in Saskatchewan Thomson Lake (Canada)
- Location: RM of Wood River No. 74, Saskatchewan
- Coordinates: 49.7472°N 106.5998°W
- Type: Reservoir
- Part of: Wood River drainage basin
- Primary inflows: Wood River
- River sources: Wood Mountain Hills
- Primary outflows: Wood River
- Basin countries: Canada
- Surface area: 995.3 ha (2,459 acres)
- Max. depth: 15.31 m (50.2 ft)
- Shore length^{1}: 68.3 km (42.4 mi)
- Surface elevation: 712 m (2,336 ft)
- ^{1} Shore length is not a well-defined measure.

Thomson Lake is a reservoir in the Canadian province of Saskatchewan along the course of Wood River in the Old Wives Lake closed watershed. The lake was created in 1958 for irrigation and consumption with the damming of Wood River. It was named after Dr Leonard Thomson who was the director of the Prairie Farm Rehabilitation Administration (PFRA) at the time.

Most of Thomson Lake is within the Rural Municipality of Wood River No. 74 while the northern tip is within the Rural Municipality of Gravelbourg No. 104. Thomson Lake Regional Park is located on the eastern shore of the lake and, other than the cabins at the park, there is one small cottage community on the lake called Gaumond Bay; it is located along a bay at the northern end of the lake. Lafleche, located along Lafleche Creek, is the closest town at about 5 kilometres (3.1 mi) east of the southernmost point and the town of Gravelbourg is 9.7 kilometres (6.0 mi) north of the lake. Access to the lake is from Highway 58.

== Thomson Lake Regional Park ==
Thomson Lake Regional Park (49.7687°N 106.5775°W) was the first regional park in Saskatchewan. It received its charter on 21 March 1961 and officially opened on 10 July of that same year. Seeing the potential for a great recreational spot, Dr Thomson was instrumental in the initial development of the park. Originally, the park had only a sand beach, bathhouse, playground, 12 campsites, 64 cottages, and a 9-hole golf course. At that time, the lake was stocked with rainbow trout.

The park is now 200 acres and has over 260 campsites with modern washroom facilities, showers, laundry, and potable water. There is also a BMX track, swimming pool, hiking trails, boat launch, filleting station, ball diamond, minigolf, and swimming lessons.

The golf course, which has a driving range and clubhouse with a dining lounge and pro shop, is a grass greens, par 36 course with a total of 3,007 yards.

== Fish species ==
Fish species commonly found in Thomson Lake include northern pike, yellow perch, and walleye. The lake is regularly stocked with walleye fry. In 2022, it was stocked with 500,000 fry and, in 2024, it was stocked with 400,000.

== See also ==
- List of lakes of Saskatchewan
- Tourism in Saskatchewan
