= Rural Municipality of Wood River No. 74 =

Rural municipality in Saskatchewan, Canada

Wood River No. 74
- Rural municipality
- Rural Municipality of Wood River No. 74

- Location of the RM of Wood River No. 74 in Saskatchewan
- Coordinates: 49.650°N 106.598°W
- Country: Canada
- Province: Saskatchewan
- Census division: 3
- SARM division: 2
- Federal riding: Cypress Hills—Grasslands
- Provincial riding: Wood River
- Formed: December 9, 1912

Government
  - Reeve: David Sproule
  - Governing body: RM of Wood River No. 74 Council
  - Administrator: Brekke Massé
  - Office location: Lafleche

Area (2016)
  - Land: 838.45 km^{2} (323.73 sq mi)

Population (2016)
  - Total: 433
  - Density: 0.5/km^{2} (1.3/sq mi)
- Time zone: CST
  - Summer (DST): CST
- Postal code: S0H 2K0
- Area codes: 306 and 639

The Rural Municipality of Wood River No. 74 (2016 population: 433) is a rural municipality (RM) in the Canadian province of Saskatchewan within Census Division No. 3 and SARM Division No. 2. It is located in the southwest portion of the province.

== History ==
The RM of Wood River No. 74 incorporated as a rural municipality on December 9, 1912.

== Geography ==
=== Communities and localities ===
The following unincorporated communities are within the RM.

Localities

- Lafleche
- Melaval
- Woodrow

=== Parks ===
- Thomson Lake Regional Park

== Demographics ==
Population history (1981–2016)
Year	Pop.	±%
1981	542	—
1986	524	−3.3%
1991	487	−7.1%
1996	437	−10.3%
2001	370	−15.3%
2006	387	+4.6%
2011	324	−16.3%
2016	433	+33.6%
Source: Statistics Canada via Saskatchewan Bureau of Statistics

In the 2021 Census of Population conducted by Statistics Canada, the RM of Wood River No. 74 had a population of 466 living in 199 of its 281 total private dwellings, a change of 7.6% from its 2016 population of 433. With a land area of 824.84 km^{2} (318.47 sq mi), it had a population density of 0.6/km^{2} (1.5/sq mi) in 2021.

In the 2016 Census of Population, the RM of Wood River No. 74 recorded a population of 433 living in 183 of its 205 total private dwellings, a 33.6% change from its 2011 population of 324. With a land area of 838.45 km^{2} (323.73 sq mi), it had a population density of 0.5/km^{2} (1.3/sq mi) in 2016.

== Government ==
The RM of Wood River No. 74 is governed by an elected municipal council and an appointed administrator that meets on the second Tuesday of every month. The reeve of the RM is David Sproule while its administrator is Brekke Massé. The RM's office is located in Lafleche.
