= Glentworth, Saskatchewan =

Community in Saskatchewan, Canada

Glentworth
- Unincorporated community
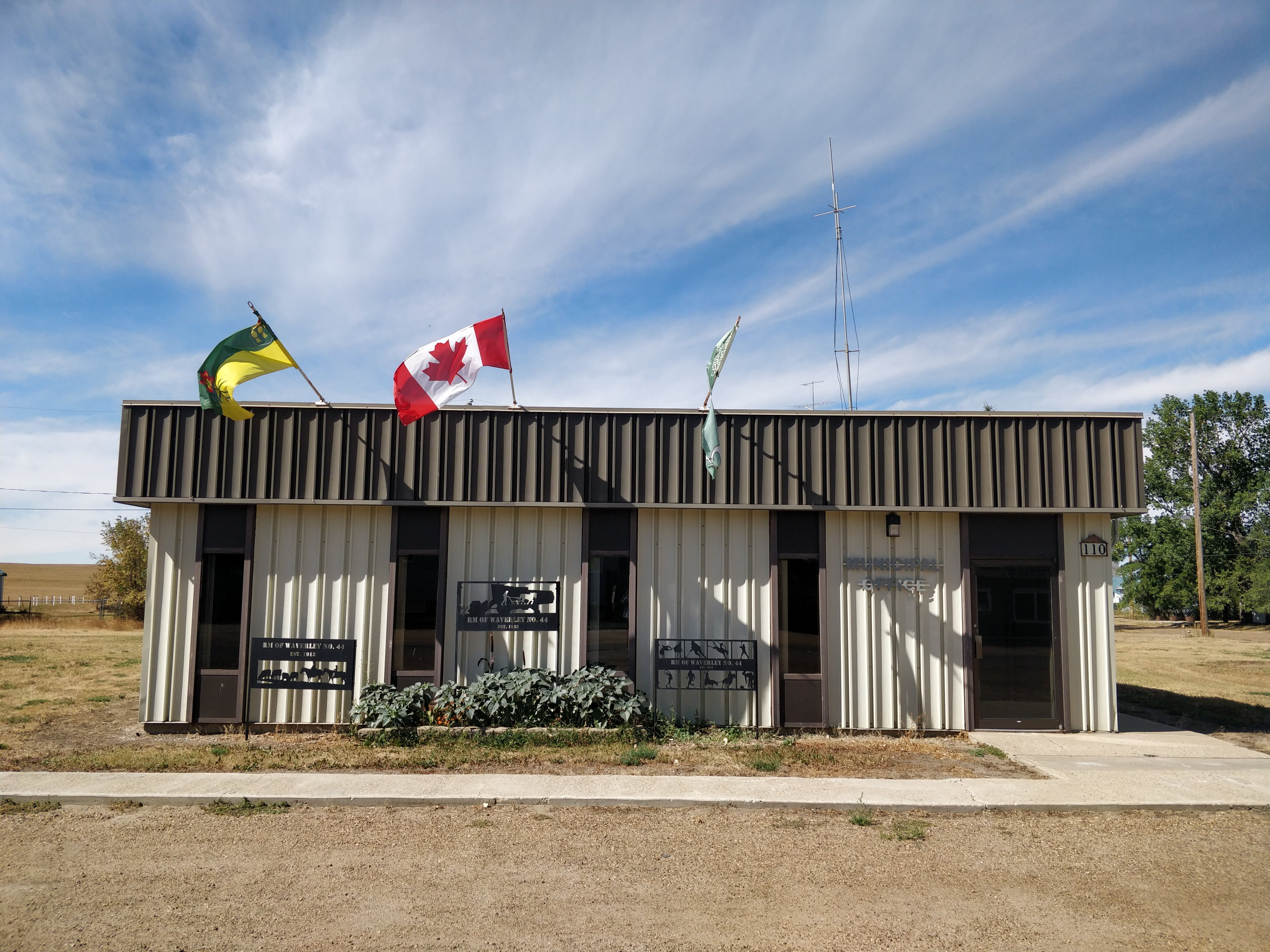
- Office of the R.M. of Waverley

- Glentworth Glentworth (Saskatchewan)
- Coordinates: 49°25′25″N 106°40′45″W
- Country: Canada
- Province: Saskatchewan
- Rural municipality: Waverley No. 44

Population (2001)
  - Total: 65
  - Density: 232.1/km^{2} (601/sq mi)

Glentworth is a community in Saskatchewan, Canada. It is surrounded by the Rural Municipality of Waverley No. 44, whose office is located within the hamlet. Access is from Highway 18.

== Etymology ==
Glentworth is named after the village of Glentworth, Lincolnshire, England.

== See also ==
- List of communities in Saskatchewan
