= Bateman, Saskatchewan =

Bateman
- Location of Bateman
- Coordinates: 50°00′36″N 106°44′59″W
- Country: Canada
- Province: Saskatchewan
- Region: Southwest Saskatchewan
- Census division: 3
- Rural municipality: Gravelbourg No. 104
- Established: 1908
- Time zone: UTC−06:00 (CST)
- Postal code: S0H 0E0
- Area code: 306
- Highways: Highway 610 / Highway 718
- Waterways: Notukeu Creek
- Attractions: Bateman Historical Museum

Bateman is a locality in the southwest region of Saskatchewan, Canada, 26 km (16 mi) north of the Red Coat Trail. It was named after Jim Bateman, the first settler to come to the area with his family in 1908.

Bateman was once a prosperous community, which had a peak population of more than 300 citizens in the late 1920s. In 2000, the last resident left, and many of the remaining buildings were torn down by the government of Saskatchewan.

== History ==
Upon arrival in 1908, Jim Bateman took possession of a quarter section of land on the banks of Notukeu Creek (a tributary of Wood River). In 1911, Bateman opened a post office. His daughter Lydia was sworn in as the post mistress and drove up to St. Boswells, 10 km (6.2 mi) northwest of Bateman, with her father to pick up the community's first mail bag.

During its pioneer times of great prosperity, Bateman had over 300 residents during the late 1920s. Bateman was also a focal point for small family grain farmers in the region. The community once boasted four grain elevators, a bank, a theatre, restaurants, two gas stations, two churches, three grocery stores, skating and curling rink, and two implement businesses. The community even had its own power plant and street light system.

== Education ==
Bateman once had a school that covered grades K–12, but closed due to the consolidation of schools. In 1966, Bateman lost its grade 12 classes, and a few years after that the school would again lose grades 10 and 11, to the neighbouring town of Gravelbourg, leaving only grade nine for the high-school level, eventually being moved there as well, leaving just the elementary classes. In 1996, Bateman's school finally closed for good.

Today the once impressive brick school has been demolished due to the building's poor condition. All that remains of the former school is the foundation and a commemorative sign.

== Notable people ==
- Gordon James McNeill, was a Member of the Legislative Assembly from 1975 until 1978, representing the constituency of Meadow Lake for the New Democratic Party.

== See also ==
- List of communities in Saskatchewan
- Lists of ghost towns in Canada
- List of ghost towns in Saskatchewan
