= Vantage, Saskatchewan =

Community in Saskatchewan, Canada

Coordinates: 49°50′27″N 106°01′55″W

Vantage is a hamlet in the Rural Municipality of Sutton No. 103, Saskatchewan, Canada. Listed as a designated place by Statistics Canada, the hamlet had a reported population of zero in the Canada 2006 Census.

== Demographics ==
Canada census – Vantage, Saskatchewan community profile

Population
Land area
Population density
Median age
Private dwellings
Median household income

== Heritage sites ==
Vantage Methodist or (Grace United)

The church was built in Vantage in 1917. Vantage Church shared a minister with Mossbank and Ettington. Rev. Bert Howard was the first ordained minister.

== See also ==
- List of communities in Saskatchewan
- List of hamlets in Saskatchewan
