= Rural Municipality of Sutton No. 103 =

Rural municipality in Saskatchewan, Canada

Sutton No. 103
- Rural municipality
- Rural Municipality of Sutton No. 103

- Location of the RM of Sutton No. 103 in Saskatchewan
- Coordinates: 49.917°N 106.209°W
- Country: Canada
- Province: Saskatchewan
- Census division: 3
- SARM division: 2
- Federal riding: Cypress Hills—Grasslands
- Provincial riding: Wood River
- Formed: December 11, 1911

Government
  - Reeve: Jonathan Kolish
  - Governing body: RM of Sutton No. 103 Council
  - Administrator: Jessica Green
  - Office location: Mossbank

Area (2016)
  - Land: 822.4 km^{2} (317.5 sq mi)

Population (2016)
  - Total: 240
  - Density: 0.3/km^{2} (0.78/sq mi)
- Time zone: CST
  - Summer (DST): CST
- Postal code: S0H 3G0
- Area codes: 306 and 639

The Rural Municipality of Sutton No. 103 (2016 population: 240) is a rural municipality (RM) in the Canadian province of Saskatchewan within Census Division No. 3 and SARM Division No. 2.

== History ==
The RM of Sutton No. 103 incorporated as a rural municipality on December 11, 1911.

== Geography ==
=== Communities and localities ===
The following urban municipalities are surrounded by the RM.

Localities

- Ettington, dissolved as a village, December 31, 1948
- Mazenod, dissolved as a village, January 1, 2002
- Palmer, dissolved as a village, January 1, 2002
- Vantage

== Demographics ==
Population history (1981–2016)
Year	Pop.	±%
1981	498	—
1986	423	−15.1%
1991	384	−9.2%
1996	344	−10.4%
2001	295	−14.2%
2006	294	−0.3%
2011	240	−18.4%
2016	240	+0.0%
Source: Statistics Canada via Saskatchewan Bureau of Statistics

In the 2021 Census of Population conducted by Statistics Canada, the RM of Sutton No. 103 had a population of 230 living in 103 of its 126 total private dwellings, a change of −4.2% from its 2016 population of 240. With a land area of 792.29 km^{2} (305.90 sq mi), it had a population density of 0.3/km^{2} (0.8/sq mi) in 2021.

In the 2016 Census of Population, the RM of Sutton No. 103 recorded a population of 240 living in 103 of its 112 total private dwellings, a 0% change from its 2011 population of 240. With a land area of 822.4 km^{2} (317.5 sq mi), it had a population density of 0.3/km^{2} (0.8/sq mi) in 2016.

== Government ==
The RM of Sutton No. 103 is governed by an elected municipal council and an appointed administrator that meets on the second Thursday of every month. The reeve of the RM is Jonathan Kolish while its administrator is Jessica Green. The RM's office is located in Mossbank.

== See also ==
- List of rural municipalities in Saskatchewan
