= Mazenod, Saskatchewan =

Community in Saskatchewan, Canada

Mazenod
- Unincorporated community
- Location within Sutton No. 103 Location within Saskatchewan
- Coordinates: 49°51′35″N 106°12′46″W
- Country: Canada
- Province: Saskatchewan
- Rural municipality: Sutton No. 103

Government
  - Governing body: Rural Municipality of Sutton No. 103

Area
  - Total: 3.85 km^{2} (1.49 sq mi)

Population (2016)
  - Total: 10
  - Density: 2.6/km^{2} (6.7/sq mi)
- Time zone: CST
- Area code: 306
- Highways: Highway 43 / Highway 608

Mazenod (/ˈmeɪznɒd/, MAYZ-nod) is a hamlet in the Rural Municipality of Sutton No. 103, Saskatchewan, Canada. It is part of a region of wider French Catholic settlement centred around the town of Gravelbourg. The hamlet bears the name of Father Eugène de Mazenod, founder of the Missionary Oblates of Mary Immaculate, a religious order active in the settlement of Western Canada.

The hamlet is located 93 kilometres (58 mi) southwest of the city of Moose Jaw on Highway 43.

== History ==
Prior to January 1, 2002, Mazenod was incorporated as a village, and was restructured as a hamlet under the jurisdiction of the RM of Sutton on that date.

== Demographics ==
In the 2021 Census of Population conducted by Statistics Canada, Mazenod had a population of 25 living in 11 of its 11 total private dwellings, a change of 150% from its 2016 population of 10. With a land area of 3.77 km^{2} (1.46 sq mi), it had a population density of 6.6/km^{2} (17.2/sq mi) in 2021.

== Notable people ==
- Frank Fletcher Hamilton
- Jim MacNeill

== See also ==
- List of communities in Saskatchewan
- List of hamlets in Saskatchewan
