= Pambrun =

- Unorganized hamlet
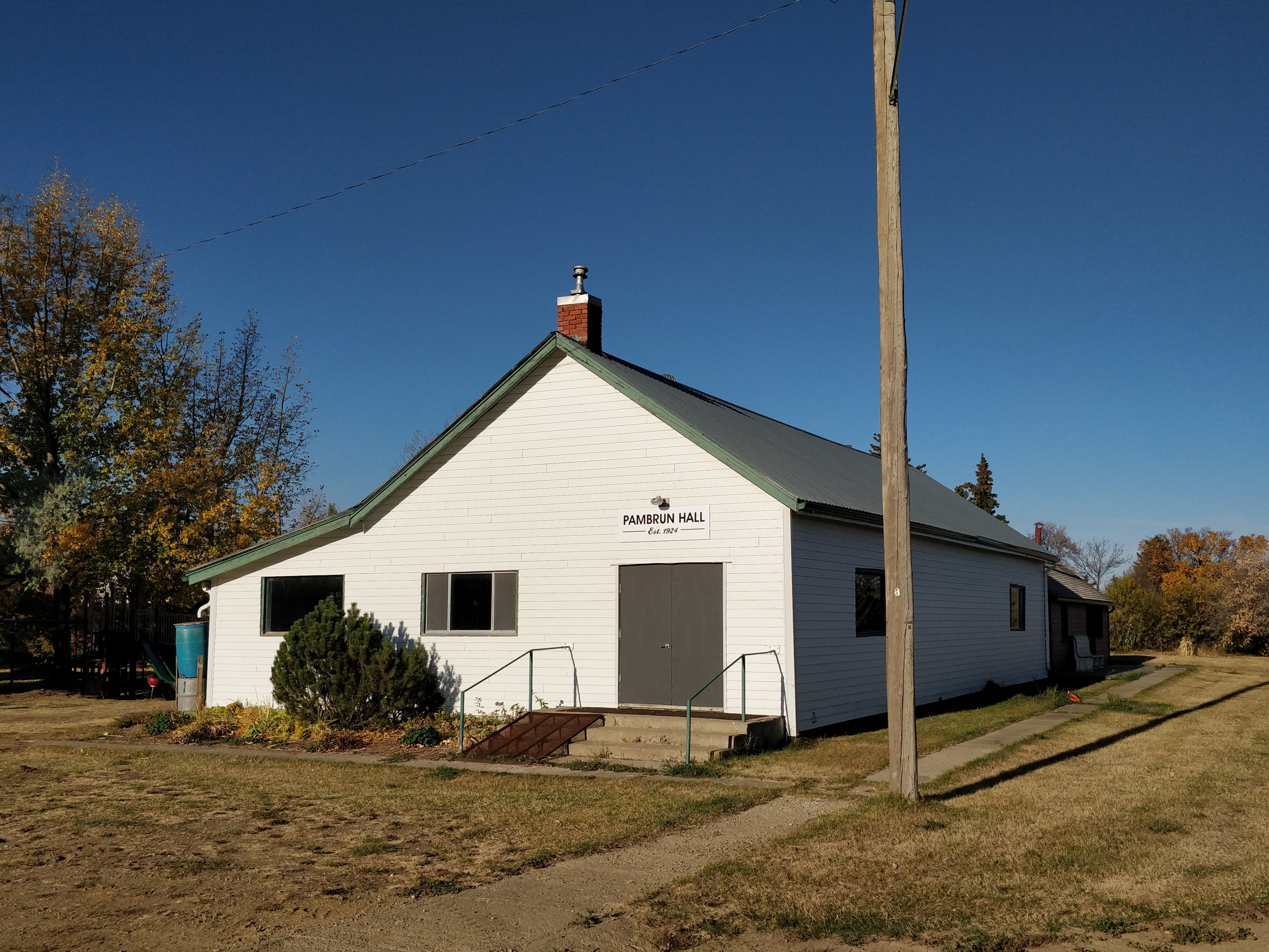
- Pambrun community hall

- Location within Whiska Creek No. 106 Location within Saskatchewan
- Coordinates: 49.935°N 107.458°W
- Country: Canada
- Province: Saskatchewan
- Rural municipality: Whiska Creek No. 106
- Postal code: S0N 1W0

Pambrun is an unincorporated community in Saskatchewan, Canada, 61 km southeast of the city of Swift Current. It is located on Highway 43, at its junction with Highway 628, in the Rural Municipality of Whiska Creek No. 106.

The community is home to the Millar College of the Bible, which employs most of the community's population.

In previous years Pambrun was home to a car dealership, as well as three grain elevators, none of which are standing today.
