= Ettington, Saskatchewan =

Community in Saskatchewan, Canada

Ettington is a hamlet in the Rural Municipality of Sutton No. 103, Saskatchewan, Canada. It previously held the status of a village until December 31, 1948.

== Demographics ==
Prior to December 31, 1948, Ettington was incorporated as a village, and was restructured as a hamlet under the jurisdiction of the Rural municipality of Sutton No. 103 on that date.

== See also ==
- List of communities in Saskatchewan
- List of hamlets in Saskatchewan
