= Fir Mountain =

Hamlet in Saskatchewan, Canada

Coordinates: 49°23′07″N 106°33′16″W

Location of Fir Mountain in Saskatchewan

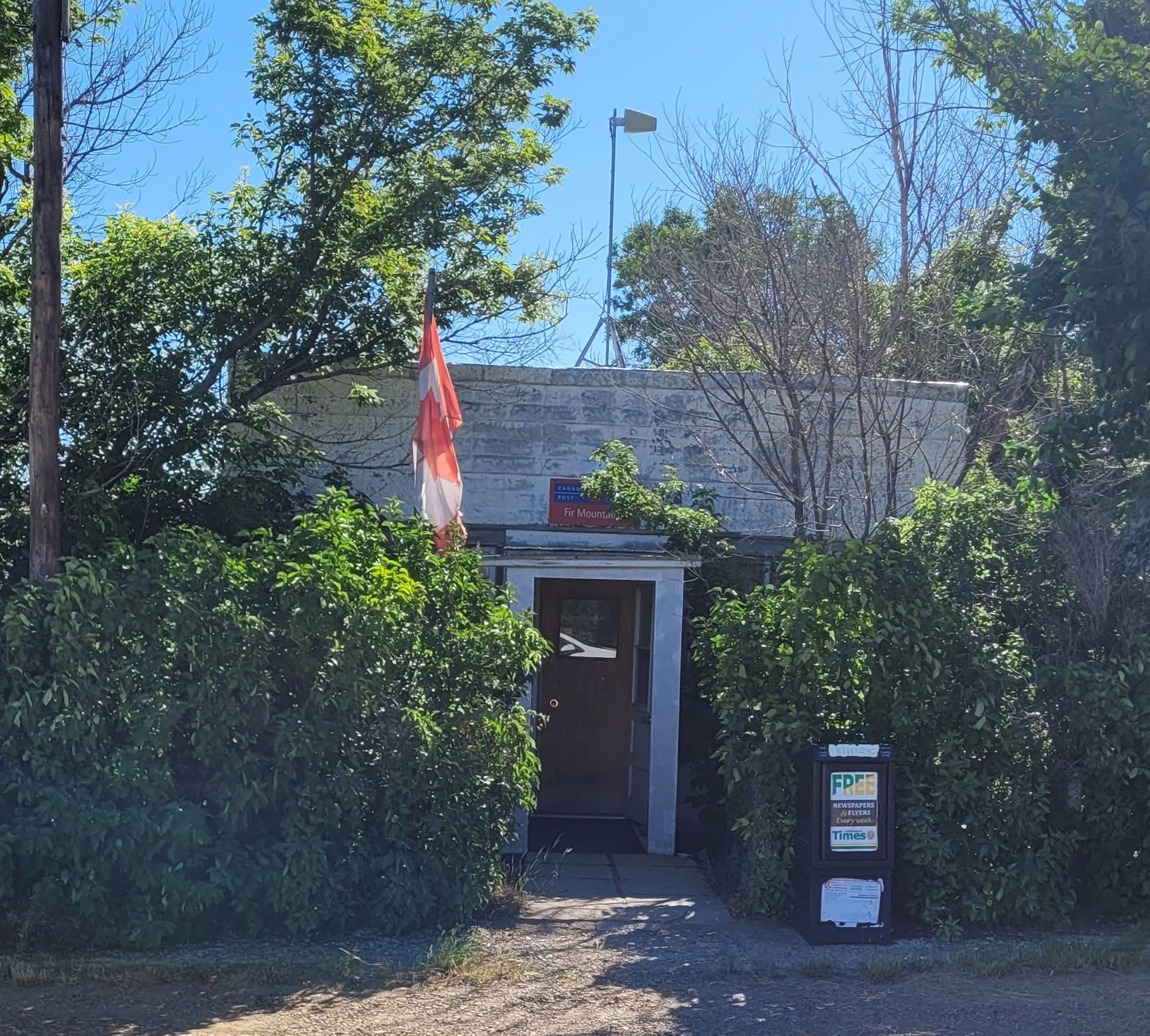
Post office Fir Mountain

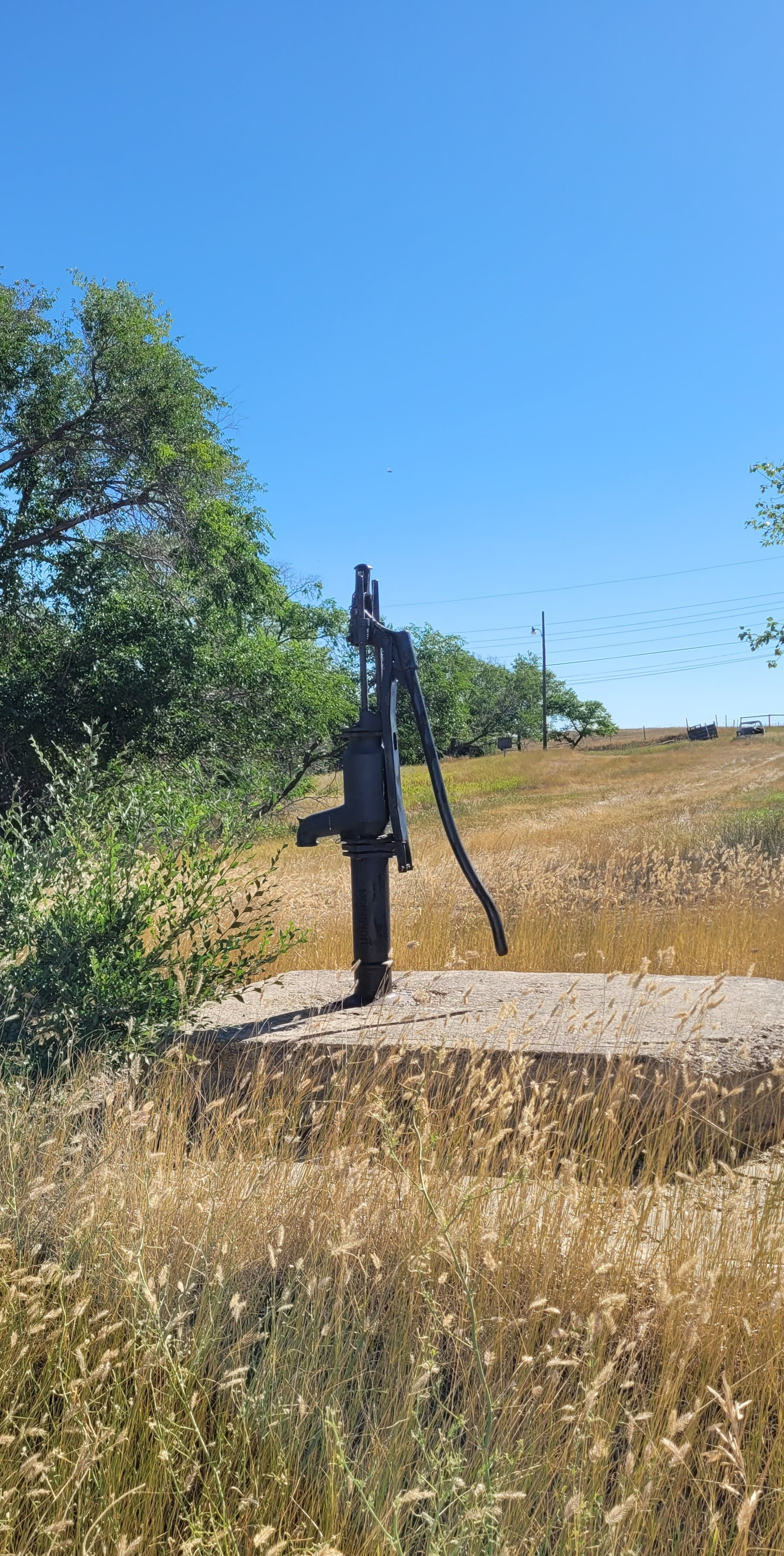
Well pump Fir Mountain

Fir Mountain is a hamlet in Saskatchewan, Canada. Access is from Highway 18.

== Etymology ==
The Fir Mountain school was established in 1913. Local records indicate that Mrs. D. H. Blood, the first postmistress, named it after "her home in the United States", but there is no American community known by that name. Fir Mountain is more likely named after the nearby Wood Mountain hills, which are indeed forested.

== In popular culture ==
- As part of the film series The Grasslands Project, A Rancher’s View describes raising cattle adjacent to Grasslands National Park where conservation of the Sage Grouse is a priority.

== See also ==
- List of hamlets in Saskatchewan
