= Rural Municipality of Gravelbourg No. 104 =

Rural municipality in Saskatchewan, Canada

Gravelbourg No. 104
- Rural municipality
- Rural Municipality of Gravelbourg No. 104
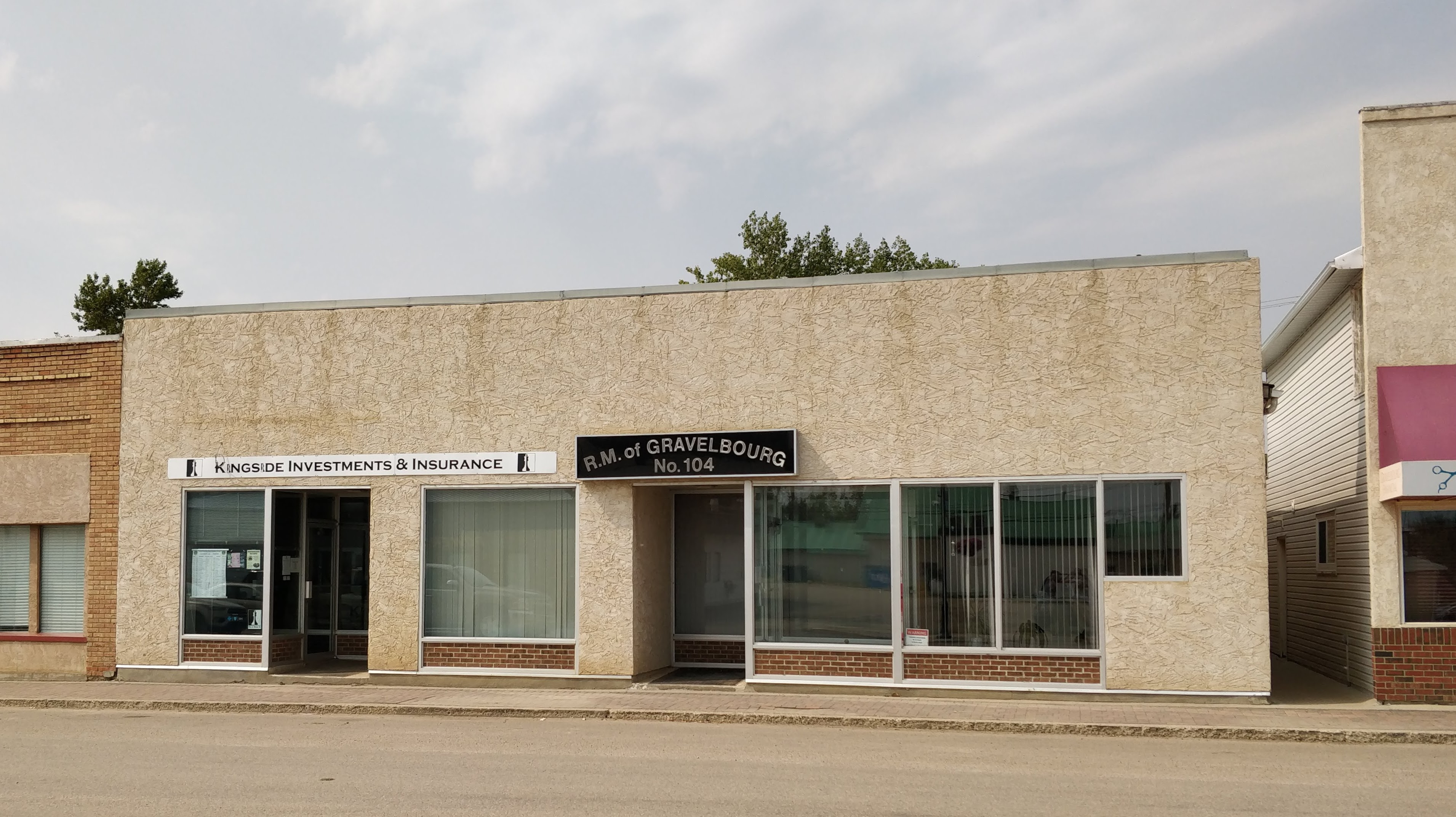
- R.M. office in Gravelbourg

- Location of the RM of Gravelbourg No. 104 in Saskatchewan
- Coordinates: 49.907°N 106.600°W
- Country: Canada
- Province: Saskatchewan
- Census division: 3
- SARM division: 2
- Federal riding: Cypress Hills—Grasslands
- Provincial riding: Wood River
- Formed: December 9, 1912

Government
  - Reeve: Guy Lorrain
  - Governing body: RM of Gravelbourg No. 104 Council
  - Administrator: Patricia Verville
  - Office location: Gravelbourg

Area (2016)
  - Land: 841.98 km^{2} (325.09 sq mi)

Population (2016)
  - Total: 472
  - Density: 0.6/km^{2} (1.6/sq mi)
- Time zone: CST
  - Summer (DST): CST
- Postal code: S0H 1X0
- Area codes: 306 and 639
- Website: Official website

The Rural Municipality of Gravelbourg No. 104 (2016 population: 472) is a rural municipality (RM) in the Canadian province of Saskatchewan within Census Division No. 3 and SARM Division No. 2. It is located in the southwest portion of the province.

== History ==
The RM of Gravelbourg No. 104 was incorporated as a rural municipality on December 9, 1912. Its preceding local improvement district was established in 1908.

== Geography ==
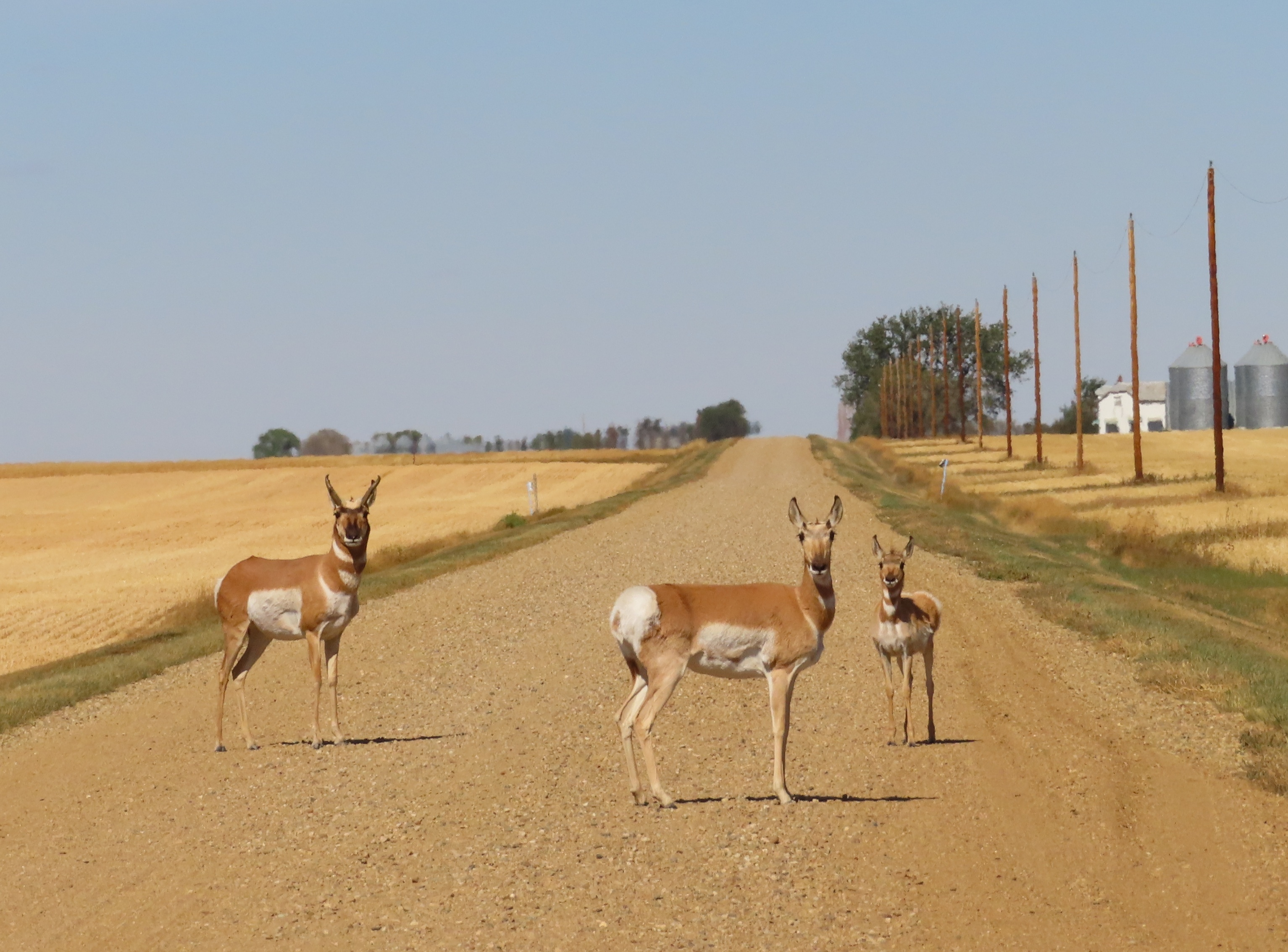
Pronghorn standing on a road in the RM of Gravelbourg

Wood River and Notukeu Creek are two natural features in the RM. The lake resort of Gaumond Bay is on Thomson Lake near Thomson Lake Regional Park.

=== Communities and localities ===
The following urban municipalities are surrounded by the RM.

Towns

- Gravelbourg

The following unincorporated communities are within the RM.

Localities

- Bateman
- Coppen

=== Historic sites ===
There are there are seven Saskatchewan historical sites on the Canadian Register of Historic Places in the RM.

- St. Elizabeth Mission
- Bateman United Church
- Baker Homestead Site
- Eason's Grove Site
- Wamsley Bridge Site
- Trapper's Cabin Site
- Cripple Creek Crossing Site

== Demographics ==
Population history (1981–2016)
Year	Pop.	±%
1981	642	—
1986	620	−3.4%
1991	549	−11.5%
1996	491	−10.6%
2001	409	−16.7%
2006	329	−19.6%
2011	306	−7.0%
2016	472	+54.2%
Source: Statistics Canada via Saskatchewan Bureau of Statistics

In the 2021 Census of Population conducted by Statistics Canada, the RM of Gravelbourg No. 104 had a population of 317 living in 125 of its 154 total private dwellings, a change of −14.8% from its 2016 population of 372. With a land area of 824.45 km^{2} (318.32 sq mi), it had a population density of 0.4/km^{2} (1.0/sq mi) in 2021.

In the 2016 Census of Population, the RM of Gravelbourg No. 104 recorded a population of 472 living in 184 of its 188 total private dwellings, a 54.2% change from its 2011 population of 306. With a land area of 841.98 km^{2} (325.09 sq mi), it had a population density of 0.6/km^{2} (1.5/sq mi) in 2016.

== Government ==
The RM of Gravelbourg No. 104 is governed by an elected municipal council and an appointed administrator that meets on the second Wednesday of every month. The reeve of the RM is Guy Lorrain while its administrator is Patricia Verville. The RM's office is located in Gravelbourg.
