= Rural Municipality of Whiska Creek No. 106 =

Rural municipality in Saskatchewan, Canada

Whiska Creek No. 106
- Rural municipality
- Rural Municipality of Whiska Creek No. 106

- Location of the RM of Whiska Creek No. 106 in Saskatchewan
- Coordinates: 49.922°N 107.446°W
- Country: Canada
- Province: Saskatchewan
- Census division: 3
- SARM division: 3
- Federal riding: Cypress Hills—Grasslands
- Provincial riding: Wood River
- Formed: January 1, 1913

Government
  - Reeve: Kelly Williamson
  - Governing body: RM of Whiska Creek No. 106 Council
  - Administrator: Teresa Richards
  - Office location: Vanguard

Area (2016)
  - Land: 851.89 km^{2} (328.92 sq mi)

Population (2016)
  - Total: 465
  - Density: 0.5/km^{2} (1.3/sq mi)
- Time zone: CST
  - Summer (DST): CST
- Postal code: S0N 2V0
- Area codes: 306 and 639

The Rural Municipality of Whiska Creek No. 106 (2016 population: 465) is a rural municipality (RM) in the Canadian province of Saskatchewan within Census Division No. 3 and SARM Division No. 3. It is located in the southwest portion of the province.

== History ==
The RM of Whiska Creek No. 106 incorporated as a rural municipality on January 1, 1913.

== Demographics ==
Population history (1981–2016)
Year	Pop.	±%
1981	605	—
1986	553	−8.6%
1991	479	−13.4%
1996	505	+5.4%
2001	547	+8.3%
2006	520	−4.9%
2011	499	−4.0%
2016	465	−6.8%
Source: Statistics Canada via Saskatchewan Bureau of Statistics

In the 2021 Census of Population conducted by Statistics Canada, the RM of Whiska Creek No. 106 had a population of 512 living in 123 of its 151 total private dwellings, a change of 10.1% from its 2016 population of 465. With a land area of 845.65 km^{2} (326.51 sq mi), it had a population density of 0.6/km^{2} (1.6/sq mi) in 2021.

In the 2016 Census of Population, the RM of Whiska Creek No. 106 recorded a population of 465 living in 111 of its 142 total private dwellings, a −6.8% change from its 2011 population of 499. With a land area of 851.89 km^{2} (328.92 sq mi), it had a population density of 0.5/km^{2} (1.4/sq mi) in 2016.

== Government ==
The RM of Whiska Creek No. 106 is governed by an elected municipal council and an appointed administrator that meets on the second Monday of every month. The reeve of the RM is Kelly Williamson while its administrator is Teresa Richards. The RM's office is located in Vanguard.

== Transportation ==
Poverty Valley Aerodrome is located within the RM.

== See also ==
- List of rural municipalities in Saskatchewan
