= Lafleche, Saskatchewan =

Town in Saskatchewan, Canada

Lafleche
- Town
- Town of Lafleche
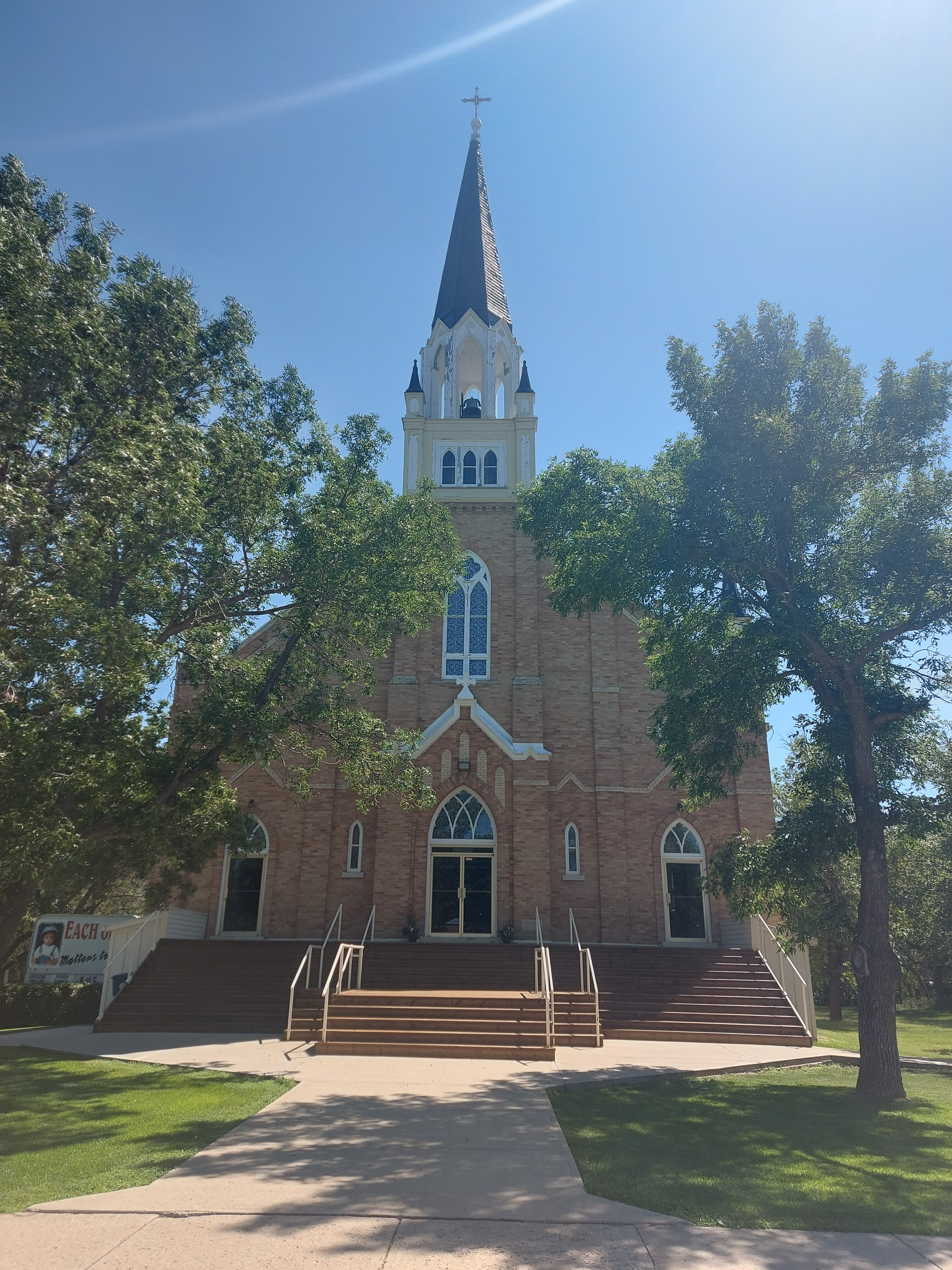
- Ste. Radegonde Roman Catholic Church in Lafleche

- Location within Wood River No. 74 Location within Saskatchewan
- Coordinates: 49°42′23″N 106°34′27″W
- Country: Canada
- Province: Saskatchewan
- Rural municipality: Wood River No. 74
- Settled: 1905
- Incorporated (Village): 1913
- Restructured (Hamlet): August 17, 2006

Government
  - Mayor: Rhys Frostad
  - Administrator: Brandi Morissette

Area
  - Land: 1.51 km^{2} (0.58 sq mi)

Population (2016)
  - Total: 382
  - Density: 253.8/km^{2} (657/sq mi)
- Time zone: CST
- Postal code: S0H 2K0
- Area code: 306
- Highways: Highway 13 / Highway 58 / Red Coat Trail
- Website: Town of Lafleche

Lafleche is a small town in southwest Saskatchewan, Canada in the Rural Municipality of Wood River No. 74. The community is located at the intersection of Highway 13 and Highway 58. It is 20 km south of Gravelbourg and 45 km west of Assiniboia. It is situated on the south bank of Lafleche Creek, which is a tributary of Wood River. Thomson Lake Regional Park is located 10 minutes north of town.

== History ==
The village of Buffalo Head started to form one and a half miles east of the present townsite with the arrival of settlers in 1905. The name was changed to Lafleche in honour of Louis-François Richer Laflèche.

In 1910, a school district was formed and a school was built at the corner of four townships on a quarter of land owned by Mr. Belisle.

In March 1912, there was already a hamlet set on a piece of land owned by F. X. Brunelle. There was a bank, two stores and blacksmith shops.

In 1912, the railway was built to Expanse, then in the fall as far as Assiniboia. When the Canadian Pacific Railway line came through in 1913 lots were divided and businesses were quickly established. Since the rail line did not pass through the hamlet, the houses of the hamlet were moved to the new site on the southeast quarter of Section 2, Township 9, Range 5, and soon another village with spacious streets and avenues sprung up and developed rapidly.

By 1913 there was the following businesses, Square Deal Store, Harness, Palace Livery, Beaver Lumber, Coal, Lafleche Cafe, Murphy's Pool Hall, Metropole Hotel, The Western Trading Co., Lafleche Meat Market, City Dray, City Garage, City Restaurant and Bakery, Glenholm Farm, Chopping, The Lafleche Blacksmith. Growth was so rapid that Lafleche was incorporated as a village in 1913. Telegraph service was established in Lafleche on December 1, 1913. By 1914 the village was composed of twelve blocks.

In 1915, many new businesses opened up, Cockshutt Plow Company, a jewelry store, Wyman and Ball (clothing store), a drug store, three lumber yards, the Lafleche-Meleval Farmers Elevators, Purity Oil, Kennedy Grain, a livery and feed barn, Real Estate and Loan Office. In 1916 a millinery was opened up which made fur hats to order. Two other private millinery stores were opened, one which became a regular was called Ladies Ready-to-Wear.

In 1919 water had to be hauled to town from the Rosy farm, and professional nursing services were available by Nurse Noble. In 1921 all school children were inoculated for typhoid fever.

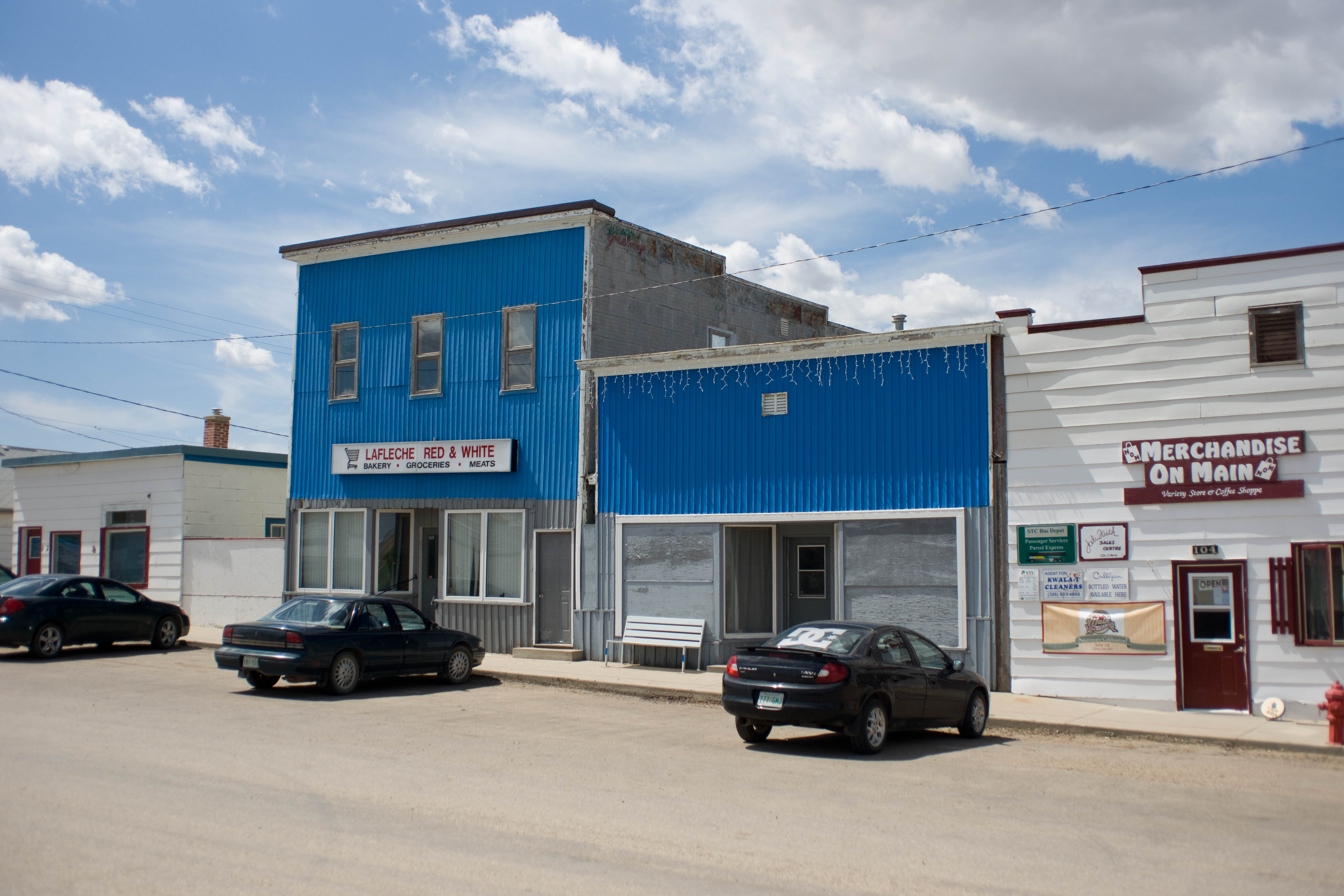
Lafleche Main Street

In 1922, it was the year of the Big Bank Robbery. On May 24, thieves broke into the Bank of Hocheloga, blowing the safe but were unsuccessful in opening it. Constable Pete Whitelaw was shot in the thigh while trying to apprehend the culprits. As a result, he spent two months in a Moose Jaw hospital. In September robbers once again visited the village. Telephone wires were cut and shots were fired at Mrs. Vick (telephone operator), Chas. Chan and Alex Stewart. No money was taken and the robbers fled by car.

In 1927, trees were planted on both sides of Main Street. A fire brigade was organized, with Nap Deuast as fire chief. Cement sidewalks were built in September of that year. Rest Rooms were opened for women also at this time.

In 1927 or 1928 a Men's Ready-to-Wear store was opened by Lawrence Lazure, next to the Globe Theatre. His office was shared by Mr. A Tissot, who was Lafleche's first photographer. The Globe Theatre began to show "sound" movies. This theatre was operational till about 1942 by Mr. Passmore but he sold it to Mr. E. Flynn. The theatre building is presently the Club 50. Before 1927, the people would watch silent movies in the basement of what is now the Legion Hall.

In August 1928, the Shaunavon Electric Company furnished electric lights and current to the village of Lafleche. By November 1929, street lights outlined Main Street.

The thirties saw hard times in the community of Lafleche. People worked for twenty cents an hour and team and man for sixty cents an hour. Rent was three to five dollars a month. Despite the drought, Lafleche was to become a village of cleanliness and beauty. Boulevards were laid out on street adjacent to Main Street and trees were planted.

In 1937 after eight consecutive crop failures, the once prosperous Lafleche district was near rock bottom. In dire need of credit, farmers and small businessmen found the bank and other financial institutions had no confidence in their ability to repay. Within a year the people of Lafleche launched the first rural community credit union in the province. Lafleche Credit Union received its charter on April 19, 1938.

Lafleche survived the thirties and the early war years of the forties. In 1943, Dr. Belcourt was appointed the first Municipal doctor, and Lafleche took over the operation of a hospital in 1944, establishing a hospital district in 1945.

In 1947 Saskatchewan Power signed an agreement with Lafleche to supply electrical energy.

Many of the buildings were built of lumber and with unsafe heating furnaces, many fires were reported. Lafleche did not have very good fire preventive measures, with only two teams of horses and two water tanks. Many of the first buildings were destroyed by fires and most of the livery and feed barns were burned. In 1948 a fire destroyed a third of the buildings on the east side of Main Street which led to the purchase of a fire truck and equipment and a siren alarm.

The Village of Lafleche became a town in 1953 with C.P. Dewulf as the first mayor.

In 1954 vapour lights were installed by Saskatchewan Power Corporation and in 1956 the town received water and sewer service. The sewer main construction began in 1957 and in June, 1958 the Town Water and Sewer Plant was officially opened.

In 1960 a piece of land was bought for the purpose of a landing strip for light airplanes. In 1961 Saskatchewan Government Telephone constructed a new dial office and telephone. Water meters were installed in residences and business places. Automatic telephones came in operation on July 5, 1962.

In November, 1961 a curling rink with three sheets of ice came into operation.

As a tribute to Saskatchewan's 60th anniversary the town of Lafleche built self-contained housing units for senior citizens. The Wood River Centennial Home was opened on July 8, 1967.

In 1969 the streets were paved in Lafleche. 1971 was the Homecoming Celebration. 1973 saw the opening of a new skating rink. On October 24, 1977, the Wheatland Lodge was opened as an eighteen suite, senior citizen low rental housing building.

Lafleche celebrated its Centennial in 2013.

== Demographics ==
In the 2021 Census of Population conducted by Statistics Canada, Lafleche had a population of 373 living in 184 of its 201 total private dwellings, a change of −2.4% from its 2016 population of 382. With a land area of 1.43 km^{2} (0.55 sq mi), it had a population density of 260.8/km^{2} (675.6/sq mi) in 2021.

Canada census – Lafleche community profile

	2021	2011
Population	373 (-2.4% from 2016)	406 (+9.7% from 2006)
Land area	1.43 km^{2} (0.55 sq mi)	1.51 km^{2} (0.58 sq mi)
Population density	261.5/km^{2} (677/sq mi)	269.7/km^{2} (699/sq mi)
Median age	56.8 (M: 54.8, F: 57.6)	52.9 (M: 51.0, F: 55.6)
Private dwellings	201 (total) 184 (occupied)	222 (total)
Median household income	$52,800

References: 2021 2011

== Religion ==
The First Presbyterian Church was the first church in the community with F. W. Therrien (a lay minister) conducting the first services in 1913.

Construction of the Roman Catholic church was also begun in 1913 with Father Emile Dubois arriving in 1914. He actively helped pioneers establish themselves in the vicinity and within five years the population increased from 300 to 600. In 1915 the Sisters of the Holy Cross arrived and in the winter of 1916 and 1917 a convent with a school for boys and girls was completed. Enrolment included 40 students boarders and local day students. Five years later student enrolment had climbed to 140. In 1922 a new larger brick faced church with a gothic steeple was built. St. Radegonde Roman Catholic Church is now a listed heritage property. The old church became the Legion Hall.

== Mail service ==
From 1909 until the railway came, mail was delivered to Lafleche by horse and buggy or sleigh from different points on the main line. However, once the railway was built, mail came regularly. Mail was sorted on the train as it went along. Mail was taken aboard and dropped off at each stop all across Canada. Tom Murphy was the first postman in Lafleche, and held the position until July 26, 1912. Mr. Edmond Bilodeau became postmaster in 1927, a held the position for 27 years. He retired on April 25, 1955. On July 31, 1958, the train service was discontinued, and mail trucks took over the business of mail service to Lafleche and surrounding towns.

== Grain ==
Following the arrival of the railway in 1913, construction of grain elevators came about. The first elevator was built in 1912. The capacity of elevators built at this time was 25,000 to 35,000 bushel capacity. Some of the first grain elevator businesses in Lafleche were: Shepard Grain Company, Saskatchewan Co-op Elevator Company which were both built in 1914. In 1915 the Shepard Company sold to Alberta Pacific Grain Company. In 1916 the Lafleche Meleval's Farmer's Elevator Company, McCabe Brothers Elevator Company and the Imperial Elevator Company were built. Some of these elevators did not last around too long and others changed hands many times.

The Lafleche Flour Mill was built in 1914 by Paul Bourdy. The mill was operated for a few years, then operations were suspended until 1920. In 1921, Fred Anderson rented the mill. He was soon joined by E. Olsen. Mr. Olsen became the manager and hired Herb Husband to run the mill at night and later hired Jim Clark. During the winter the mill ran day and night for five months. The flour went to retailers and bakers around Lafleche. In the late 1930s mill work became limited and by 1940, only custom grinding was done. Operations stopped in 1941, when the owners moved away. In 1952 the building was bought and converted into a seed cleaning plan. This operation kept going until 1974, when the owner died and operations ceased. It was sold in a public auction, dismantled and removed from the site.

== Financial services ==
The Bank of Hochelaga was established in 1920 until 1924. Though not in operation for very long, it gave the townspeople excitement, when an attempted robbery occurred on May 24, 1922. On March 13, 1924, it was reported that the Lafleche Branch of the Bank of Hochelaga would be closed and accounts would be transferred to the Bank of Hochelaga in Gravelbourg. The closing of the Lafleche branch corresponded with changes that were occurring in Montreal at the time.

The Bank of Toronto began doing business in 1913. In 1955 the name was changed to Toronto-Dominion when the Bank of Toronto and the Dominion Bank amalgamated.

In 1937, after eight consecutive crop failures, Lafleche's district was hitting a financial low. Banks did not have faith in farmers and small businesses to repay loans, so a few local residents explored the idea of a credit union. On April 19, 1938, charter No. 12 was granted to the Lafleche Credit Union Limited which then became the first rural community credit union in the province. Starting with assets valued at $52.50 and twelve members, the company grew to have $10, 994 assets and about two hundred members after the first year. In 1948, there was 1087 members and assets reaches $518,000. This helped put the Lafleche district back in prosperity. The Lafleche Credit Union Limited is also known for having granted the first credit union loan for the purchase of farm land. In 1954, the Fir Mountain Savings and Credit Union amalgamated with the Lafleche Credit Union and in 1971 Glentworth Credit Union amalgamated too. A branch office is maintained in Glentworth.

Al Charbonneau, an early employee of the credit union, went on to a distinguished career, first as manager of the Saskatchewan Credit Union League in 1959, and later as CEO of the World Council of Credit Unions from 1981 to 1993. One credit union historian states that "[p]artly because he came from a francophone background in Canada, Charbonneau had a deep understanding of the cultural dimensions of credit unionism. ... He would provide considerable leadership in expanding the linguistic capabilities of the World Council and in expanding contacts with European movements."

== Utilities ==
In 1922, a power plant was operated by Zotique Raiche to operate lights in the Village of Lafleche. It was called the Lafleche Light Company and was powered by a 50 H.P. engine. It operated from dark until eleven o'clock, Monday and Tuesday mornings and also by special arrangements for dances. The first street lights were installed in 1923. In 1933, only two street lights were left in operation due to the depression. In September, 1936, a request for more street lights was requested by Lafleche. The total cost of running eight lights was $15.00 per month. In 1947, it was bought out by Saskatchewan Power Commission. In 1949 the voltage of the town was increased from 2,300 volts to 4,600 volts.

== Medical services ==
Before Lafleche had a doctor, their needs were met by Dr. Gravel from Gravelbourg. Lafleche had its first medical doctor in March, 1913. Dr. DuChene did not last long because of an unfortunate accident. Gangrene set in and he died on December 9, 1913. Other doctors came and went between the years 1914 – 1916. In September, 1916, Dr. Louis-Emile Belcourt took over the position and held it for thirty-two years. He was truly a pioneer doctor, for her travelled many miles in a wide area surrounding Lafleche to meet people's needs. He purchased a snow-plane during the thirties with speeds up to fifty miles an hour to reach more people in less time. Dr. Belcourt opened the first hospital in 1941. Dr. Belcourt assisted in over 3,000 births and assisted at and performed over 1,500 operations. In 1948, Dr. Belcourt left to practice medicine in Moose Jaw. Dr. The RM of Wood River took over the hospital in 1945 and in 1957 a new hospital was built.

In 1913, a drugstore was opened. Adrien Belcourt took over the drugstore in 1919. He sold the original building in 1942, and moved it into the Liquor Board Store, which has housed the Lafleche Pharmacy since. Adrien Belcourt ran the drugstore for forty-five years, from 1919 to 1964, when he retired. The store has since then been managed by his son, Edmond.

Lafleche had one of the first dentists to practice in southern Saskatchewan. Dr. W.G. Wallace, first started in 1913, working two days a week in Lafleche and two days a week in Gravelbourg. In 1916, he worked solely out of Lafleche. Dr. Kestrel replaced Dr. Wallace in May, 1929.

From 1918 to 1942, Mrs. Cameroon operated a private nursing home. Mrs. Margaret Douglas provided nursing services from 1916 to 1926. Mrs. Noble came to Lafleche from England and was a trained nurse. Mrs. Deluge also operated a nursing home. Mrs. Bola Boyd was a midwife and nurse in Lafleche for twenty-four years. Mrs. Boyd ran a licensed nursing home for close to fifteen years. She was the matron at the hospital for over nine years. Mrs. William Klein the matron at the hospital before Mrs. Boyd and was sometimes called upon to help assist in operations.

== See also ==
- List of towns in Saskatchewan
- List of francophone communities in Saskatchewan
- List of communities in Saskatchewan
