= Gravelbourg =

Town in Saskatchewan, Canada

- Town
- Town of Gravelbourg
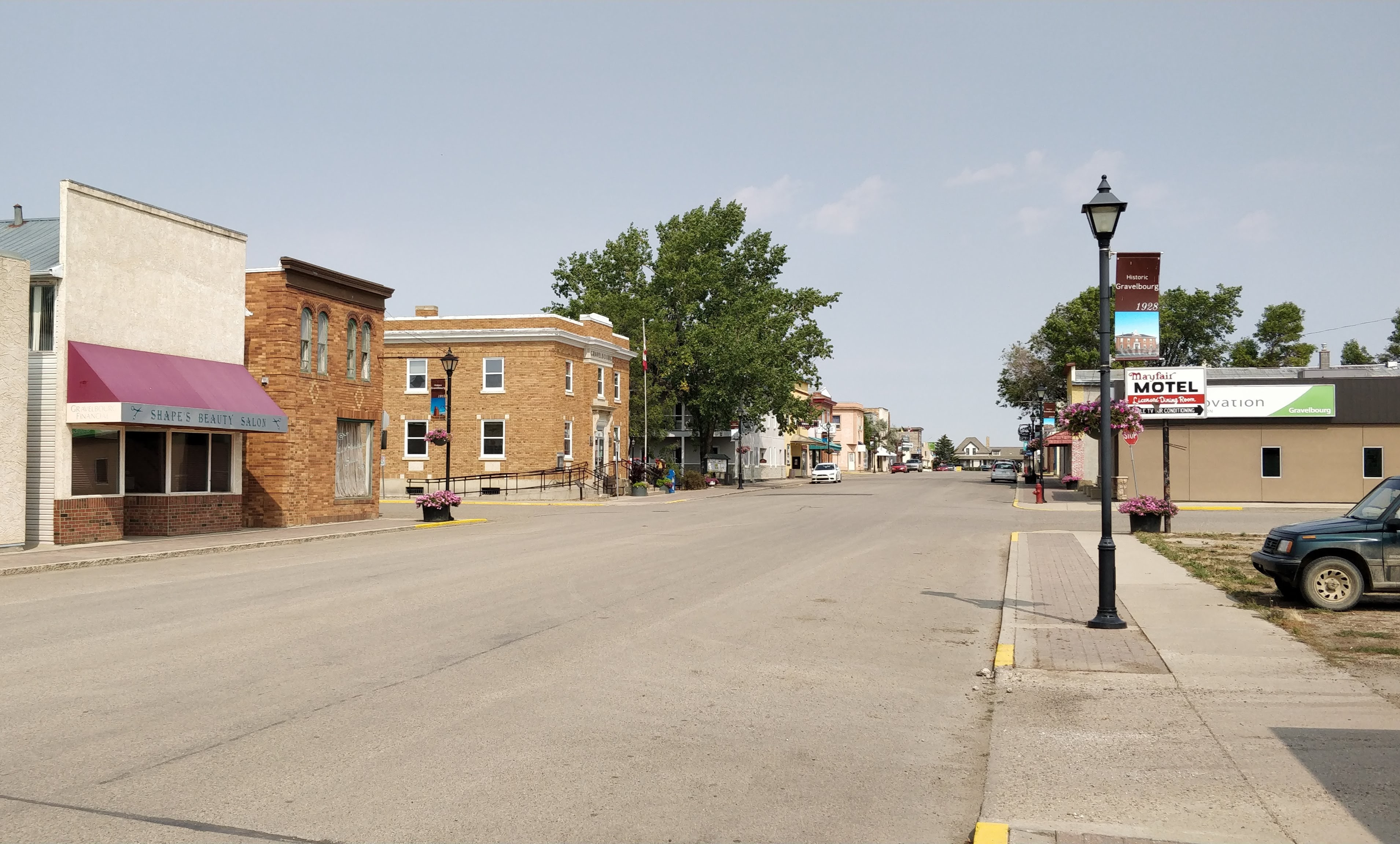
- Main Street

- Flag

- Location within Gravelbourg No. 104 Location within Saskatchewan
- Coordinates: 49°52′22″N 106°33′13″W
- Country: Canada
- Province: Saskatchewan
- Rural municipality: Gravelbourg No. 104
- Post office Founded: 1907
- Incorporated (Town): 1916

Government
  - Mayor: Mathieu Forest
  - Town Manager: Carol White
  - Governing body: Gravelbourg Town Council
  - MLA: Dave Marit
  - MP: Jeremy Patzer

Area
  - Total: 3.23 km^{2} (1.25 sq mi)

Population (2011)
  - Total: 1,116
  - Density: 346/km^{2} (900/sq mi)
- Time zone: UTC−06:00 (CST)
- Postal code: S0H 1X0
- Area code: 306
- Highways: 43, 58, and 13
- Waterways: Wood River
- Website: www.gravelbourg.ca

Gravelbourg (/ˈɡrævəlbərɡ/) is a small multicultural town in south-central Saskatchewan, Canada. It is located just west of the Wood River at the junction of provincial Highway 43 and Highway 58, approximately 125 kilometres from Moose Jaw, Swift Current, and the United States border. The region served as a path for First Nations peoples many years ago, and was also integrated into the Redcoat Trail of the 19th century. Gravelbourg is now a key link on the 21st century Trans Canada Trail.

Gravelbourg is also referenced in the fourth verse of the North American version of "I've Been Everywhere", written by Geoff Mack and made popular in North America by Hank Snow and more recently Johnny Cash.

== History ==
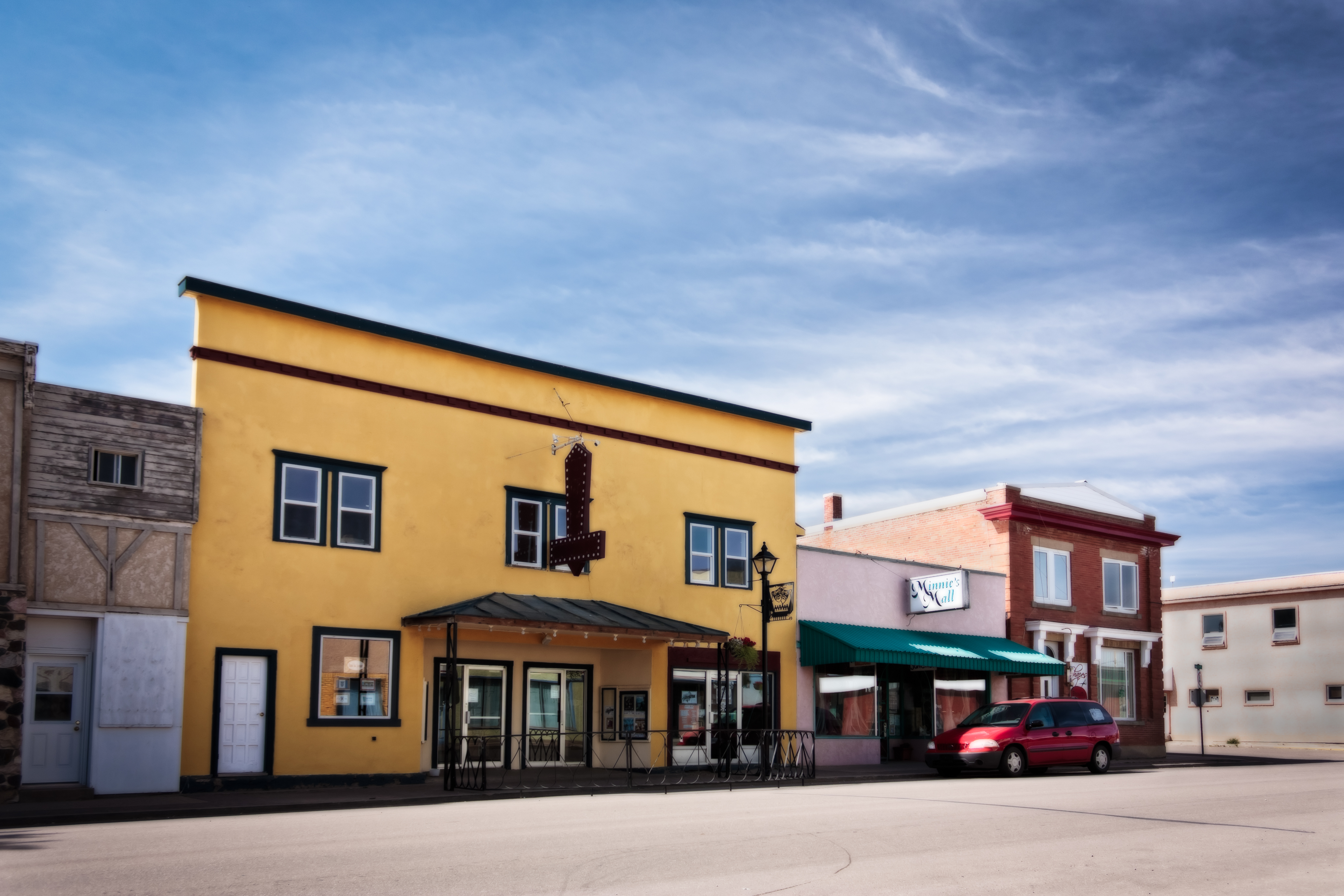
Gaiety Theatre

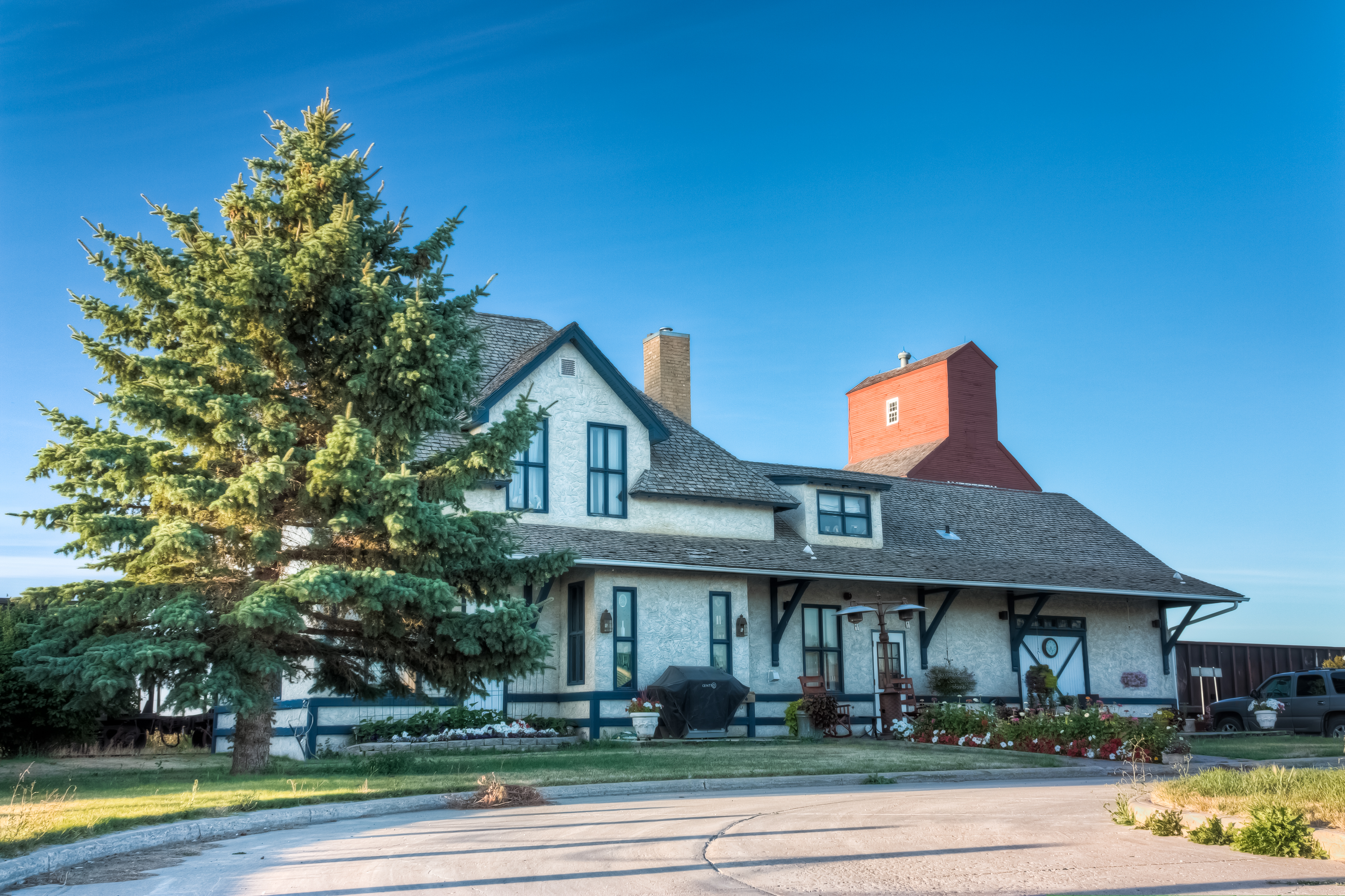
C.N.R. Station

Gravelbourg was settled in the early 1900s and was one of the French block settlements of the Gravelbourg-Lafleche-Meyronne area in southwestern Saskatchewan. In 1930 it became the cathedral city of the Roman Catholic diocese of Gravelbourg.

Gravelbourg carries the name of its founder Abbé Louis-Pierre Gravel, who was designated a Person of National Historic Significance in 1956. The inscription on the monument in Gravelbourg built in 1958 to honour him reads:

"Between 1906 and 1926 more than ten thousand Canadian citizens, many of whom were then living in the United States, answered the call of Reverend Louis-Pierre Gravel to make their homes on the broad plains of Saskatchewan where they built towns and established French-speaking cultural institutions." Parks Canada

Gravelbourg celebrates its many cultures at its annual Summer Solstice Festival d'été.

=== Historic buildings ===
A number of heritage buildings are located within the community.

Our Lady of the Assumption Roman Catholic Cathedral, the former Convent of Jesus and Mary and the former Bishop's Residence were designated the Gravelbourg Ecclesiastical Buildings National Historic Site of Canada in 1995.

Gravelbourg Court House, College Mathieu Pavilion, Gravelbourg Post Office, Gaiety Theatre and Canadian National Railway Station are also listed heritage sites.

== Demographics ==
In the 2021 Census of Population conducted by Statistics Canada, Gravelbourg had a population of 986 living in 438 of its 482 total private dwellings, a change of −9% from its 2016 population of 1,083. With a land area of 3.12 km^{2} (1.20 sq mi), it had a population density of 316.0/km^{2} (818.5/sq mi) in 2021.

Canada census – Gravelbourg community profile

	2021	2011
Population	986 (-9.0% from 2016)	1,116 (2.5% from 2006)
Land area	3.21 km^{2} (1.24 sq mi)	3.23 km^{2} (1.25 sq mi)
Population density	307.1/km^{2} (795/sq mi)	346.0/km^{2} (896/sq mi)
Median age	47.2 (M: 45.2, F: 50.4)	49.4 (M: 47.9, F: 50.8)
Private dwellings	482 (total) 438 (occupied)	516 (total)
Median household income	$73,000	$Not Available

References: 2021 2011

In the 2011 Canada Census, out of a total of 1,116 residents 625 chose English while 300 chose French as their mother tongue. Thirty nine percent or 430 residents spoke both English and French. Gravelbourg's French-language Fransaskois community is the subject of a short documentary Les Fransaskois, produced for the documentary series The Grasslands Project.

Other languages spoken in Gravelbourg were: Bisayan languages (5), Chinese (10), Dutch (5), German (15), Korean (5), Lao (5), Spanish (5), Swahili (5) and Tagalog (Pilipino, Filipino) (50).

== Climate ==
Climate data for Gravelbourg
Month	Jan	Feb	Mar	Apr	May	Jun	Jul	Aug	Sep	Oct	Nov	Dec	Year
Record high °C (°F)	12.8 (55.0)	18.0 (64.4)	24.0 (75.2)	35.0 (95.0)	37.0 (98.6)	41.5 (106.7)	42.8 (109.0)	41.7 (107.1)	39.4 (102.9)	33.5 (92.3)	22.8 (73.0)	20.6 (69.1)	42.8 (109.0)
Mean daily maximum °C (°F)	−7.4 (18.7)	−4.0 (24.8)	3.3 (37.9)	12.5 (54.5)	19.4 (66.9)	24.0 (75.2)	26.7 (80.1)	26.1 (79.0)	19.0 (66.2)	12.5 (54.5)	1.3 (34.3)	−5.8 (21.6)	10.6 (51.1)
Daily mean °C (°F)	−12.5 (9.5)	−9.3 (15.3)	−2.3 (27.9)	5.5 (41.9)	12.1 (53.8)	16.8 (62.2)	19.0 (66.2)	18.3 (64.9)	11.8 (53.2)	5.9 (42.6)	−3.8 (25.2)	−10.8 (12.6)	4.2 (39.6)
Mean daily minimum °C (°F)	−17.5 (0.5)	−14.4 (6.1)	−7.9 (17.8)	−1.5 (29.3)	4.8 (40.6)	9.5 (49.1)	11.4 (52.5)	10.3 (50.5)	4.6 (40.3)	−0.9 (30.4)	−8.8 (16.2)	−15.8 (3.6)	−2.2 (28.0)
Record low °C (°F)	−44.4 (−47.9)	−48.9 (−56.0)	−38.3 (−36.9)	−28.3 (−18.9)	−15.0 (5.0)	−8.9 (16.0)	−1.1 (30.0)	−3.9 (25.0)	−12.8 (9.0)	−26.0 (−14.8)	−32.8 (−27.0)	−41.5 (−42.7)	−48.9 (−56.0)
Average precipitation mm (inches)	22.8 (0.90)	19.0 (0.75)	20.3 (0.80)	21.2 (0.83)	48.9 (1.93)	58.5 (2.30)	60.4 (2.38)	37.4 (1.47)	34.2 (1.35)	16.4 (0.65)	18.2 (0.72)	24.8 (0.98)	381.9 (15.04)
Source: Environment Canada

== Education ==
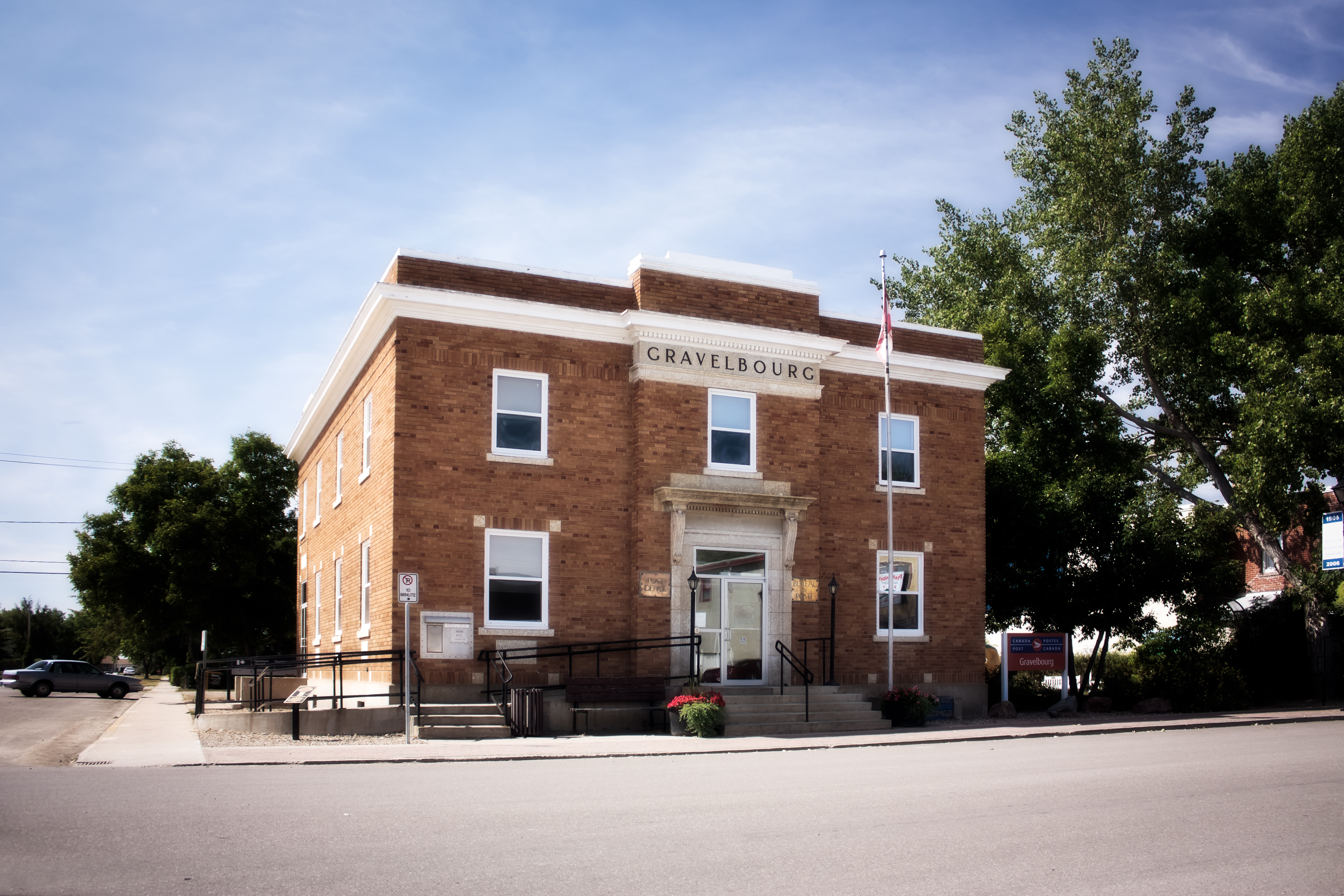
Post Office

École Gravelbourg School (Grades K to 12) is located on 1st ave in Gravelbourg. The principal is Jody Lehmann. The Convent of Jesus & Mary (Past: Gravelbourg Elementary School), is now home to the GCMC (Gravelbourg Community Music Centre).

The town has for the past four decades been noteworthy for College Mathieu, a francophone boarding school for boys and girls who wish to acquire or retain fluency in French. The College offers courses such as welding, nursing and early childhood education. The high school is now named École Mathieu de Gravelbourg and is run by Le CÉF. The school has attracted students from throughout the southern part of the province as well as other areas of Canada and overseas, notably Africa. It offers classes from Grade 8 to 12.

École Beau-Soleil offers K to Grade 7 in French.

== Churches ==
=== Former Catholic bishopric ===
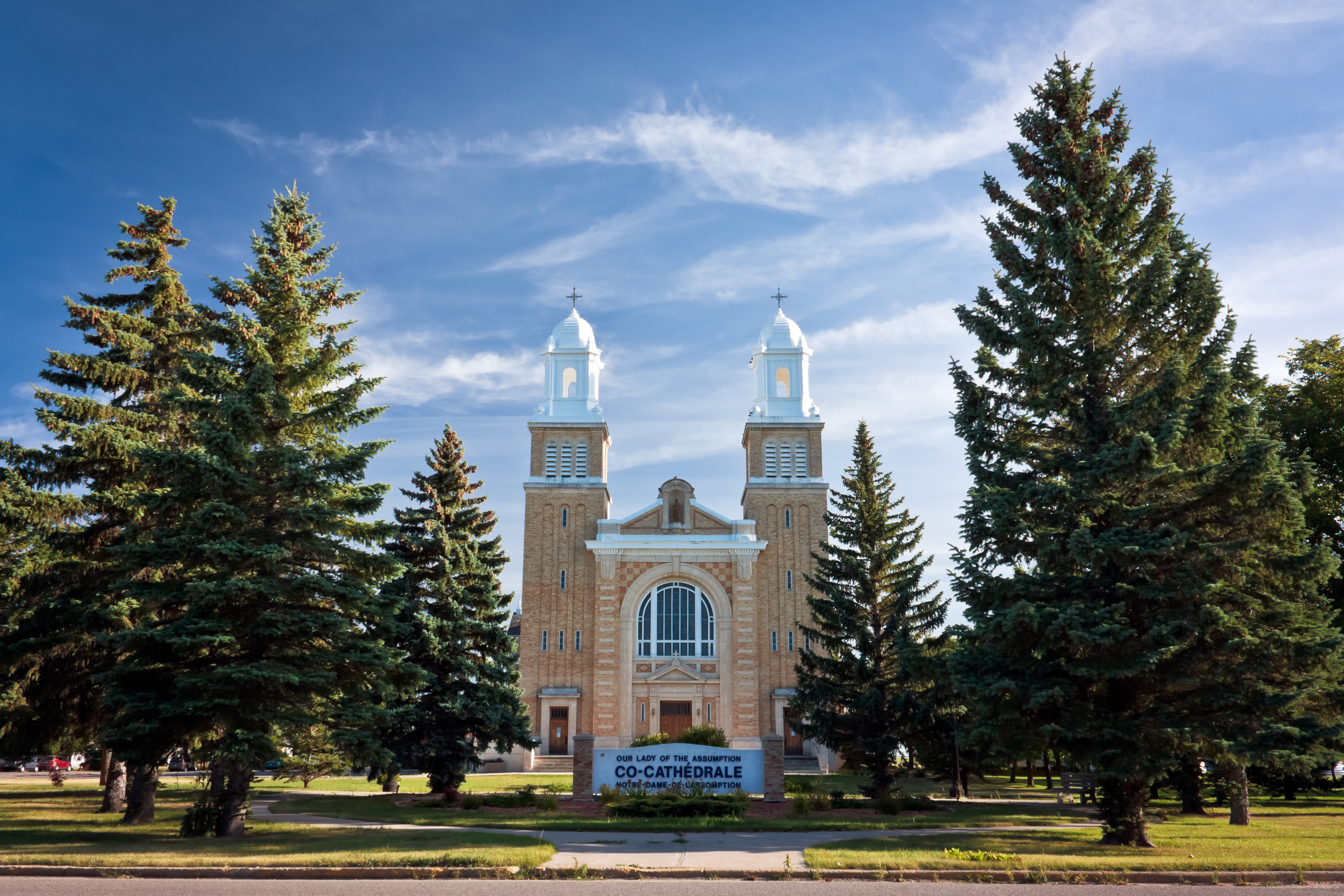
Cathedral of Our Lady of the Assumption

From 1930 to 1998 the town was the cathedral city of the Roman Catholic diocese of Gravelbourg, headed by a Francophone bishop. In 1998, Pope John Paul II suppressed the residential diocese, so that it is now a titular see. The Cathedral of Our Lady of the Assumption was at that time designated a "co-cathedral" of the Archdiocese of Regina.

=== Protestants ===
Lorne Calvert, the 13th Premier of Saskatchewan, was the minister of the United Church of Canada in Gravelbourg.

There are also the Gravelbourg Lutheran Church and the Church of Christ.

== Notable people ==
- Larry Hornung, played in the NHL for the Edmonton Oilers, St. Louis Blues, Winnipeg Jets, and in the WHA for the San Diego Mariners
- Gord Sherven, played in the NHL for the Edmonton Oilers, Hartford Whalers, and Minnesota North Stars
- Toby Tarnow

== See also ==
- CFRG-FM - French Language Radio Station in Gravelbourg
- List of communities in Saskatchewan
- List of francophone communities in Saskatchewan
- List of towns in Saskatchewan
