= Fife Lake, Saskatchewan =

Hamlet in Saskatchewan, Canada

Coordinates: 49°11′39″N 105°43′52″W

Location of Fife Lake in Saskatchewan

Fife Lake is a hamlet located between Coronach and Rockglen within Rural Municipality of Poplar Valley No. 12 in south-central Saskatchewan, Canada near the Canada–United States border. Approximately 40 people inhabited the village of Fife Lake in 2006. It is about 11 kilometres (6.8 mi) east of Rockin Beach Park and Fife Lake.

== History ==
Prior to January 27, 2005, Fife Lake was incorporated as a village, and was restructured as a hamlet under the jurisdiction of the RM of Poplar Valley on that date.

== Demographics ==
In the 2021 Census of Population conducted by Statistics Canada, Fife Lake had a population of 25 living in 17 of its 23 total private dwellings, a change of 0% from its 2016 population of 25. With a land area of 0.36 km^{2} (0.14 sq mi), it had a population density of 69.4/km^{2} (179.9/sq mi) in 2021.

== See also ==
- List of communities in Saskatchewan
- List of hamlets in Saskatchewan
