= Rock Creek (Saskatchewan–Montana) =

River in Saskatchewan, Canada, and Montana, United States

- Location of the river's mouth in Montana Rock Creek (Saskatchewan–Montana) (the United States)

Location
- Country: United States; Canada
- Canadian province: Saskatchewan
- U.S. state: Montana

Physical characteristics
- Source: Wood Mountain Hills
  - location: RM of Waverley No. 44, Saskatchewan
  - coordinates: 49.2701°N 106.5801°W
- Mouth: Milk River
  - location: Valley County, Montana
  - coordinates: 48.4172°N 107.0693°W

Basin features
- Progression: Milk River; Missouri River; Mississippi River
- River system: Missouri River
- Tributaries
  - left: Morgan Creek; South Creek; Willow Creek
  - right: Hellfire Creek; Weatherall Creek; McEarchern Creek

Rock Creek is a river in Saskatchewan, Canada, and Montana, United States. It has its headwaters in the Wood Mountain Hills of Saskatchewan and its mouth at the Milk River near Hinsdale, Montana. In Saskatchewan, the river flows through Grasslands National Park and Rock Creek Badlands. In Montana, it flows south through a meltwater channel to meet the Milk River, a tributary of the Missouri River. The badlands and the channel were formed over 10,000 years ago near the end of the last ice age.

== Course ==
Rock Creek begins at an elevation of almost 1,000 metres (3,300 ft) near the continental divide in the Wood Mountain Hills. It flows south into Grasslands National Park and is the main watercourse through the Rock Creek Badlands. The badlands extend south towards Montana. In the badlands, the river is joined by Hellfire Creek in the Valley of 1000 Devils. There are multiple hiking trails in and around the badlands as well as a scenic parkway. As Rock Creek travels through the badlands, it turns to the west and enters into a wide meltwater channel becoming a underfit stream. The channel — and river — then turns south into Montana.

After Rock Creek crosses the Canada–United States border, it meanders its way south towards the Milk River through the meltwater channel. The meltwater channel was formed due to the relatively fast melting ice from the continental ice sheet that covered large parts of North America during the last ice age about 10,000 years ago. Along the way, river is met by several tributaries flowing in through coulees. It also passes by the ghost town of Thoeny.

== Tributaries ==
Within Saskatchewan

- Porcupine Creek
- Hellfire Creek
- Butte Creek
- Morgan Creek
- Weatherall Creek
  - Spring Creek
  - Boggy Creek

Within Montana

- Horse Creek
- South Creek
  - North Fork South Creek
  - Coal Mine Creek
- McEachern Creek
  - Upper McEachern Creek
- Bluff Creek
- Ichpair Creek
- Crow Creek
- Big Sage Creek
- Snake Creek
- Willow Creek
- Papoose Creek
- Cash Creek

== See also ==
- List of rivers of Saskatchewan
- List of rivers of Montana
- List of tributaries of the Mississippi River
- Rock Creek (Clark Fork River tributary), a tributary of Clark Fork River
- Rock Creek (Clarks Fork Yellowstone River tributary)
