= Fife Lake (Saskatchewan) =

Lake in Saskatchewan, Canada

- Location in Saskatchewan Fife Lake (Canada)
- Location: RM of Poplar Valley No. 12; RM of Willow Bunch No. 42, Saskatchewan
- Coordinates: 49.2199°N 105.8748°W
- Type: Prairie lake
- Part of: Missouri River drainage basin
- Primary inflows: Hay Meadow Creek
- River sources: Wood Mountain Hills
- Primary outflows: Girard Creek
- Basin countries: Canada
- Max. length: 34 km (21 mi)
- Surface area: 2,943.1 ha (7,273 acres)
- Max. depth: 3.7 m (12 ft)
- Shore length^{1}: 56.1 km (34.9 mi)
- Surface elevation: 801 m (2,628 ft)
- Settlements: None
- ^{1} Shore length is not a well-defined measure.

Fife Lake is a fresh water prairie lake in the Canadian province of Saskatchewan. It is in the south-central part of the province at the eastern end of the Wood Mountain Hills. The entire lake and its shoreline is designated an Important Bird Area (IBA) of Canada to protect the nationally endangered piping plover. While there are no communities along the lake's shore, there is a park and campground at the southern end. Nearby communities include Fife Lake, Rockglen, and Lisieux. Access is from Highway 18.

== Description ==
Fife Lake a is shallow, irregularly shaped prairie lake. Its primary inflow, Hay Meadow Creek, flows into the west end of the lake from the central part of the Wood Mountain Hills. Girard Creek, the lake's outflow, is a tributary of the East Poplar River. The East Poplar River is a major tributary of the Poplar River, which connects to the Missouri River in the U.S. state of Montana.

Being a shallow prairie lake, during drought years, Fife Lake water levels drop significantly. Lake water levels have been known to fluctuate by over 2 metres (6 ft 7 in). A record surface elevation high of 802.7 m (2,634 ft) was recorded in 1979 and a record low of 800 m (2,600 ft) was recorded in 1993. By 2011, the lake had stabilised at 801.4 m (2,629 ft) above sea level. Fife Lake had been known for great walleye fishing, but the low water levels through the late 1980s and 1990s had caused the fish to die off. While the lake is known for significant seasonal water level changes, the Water Security Agency said that the extreme water level changes seen at that time were related to coal mining operations 21 kilometres (13 mi) to the south-east, near Coronarch. In the spring of 2016, with water levels having recovered, the lake was re-stocked with 200,000 walleye.

== Rockin Beach Regional Park ==
Rockin Beach Regional Park (49.1971°N 105.8641°W) is a recreational park on the southern shore of Fife Lake, about 9.3 kilometres (5.8 mi) east of Rockglen. It is run by a non-profit organisation. The park has a campground, ball diamonds, volleyball courts, hiking trails, a motocross track, and lake access with a dock and a beach for swimming. The Rockin Beach Mud Bog event is held there every August.

== Important Bird Area ==
The entirety of Fife Lake is part of the Fife Lake (SK 021) Important Bird Area (IBA) of Canada. It is considered a critical piping plover habitat under the provincial Wildlife Habitat Protection Act. That designation protects the lake up to the high water mark from development. The IBA site itself totals 81.34 km^{2} (31.41 sq mi) of land with an elevation range of 800 metres to 823 metres above sea level. Besides the piping plover, other birds important to the lake include the western grebe, eared grebe, and the black-crowned night heron.

== Fish species ==
Fish commonly found in Fife Lake include walleye and white sucker.

== See also ==
- List of lakes of Saskatchewan
- Tourism in Saskatchewan
- List of protected areas of Saskatchewan
