= Poplar River (Montana–Saskatchewan) =

River in central North America

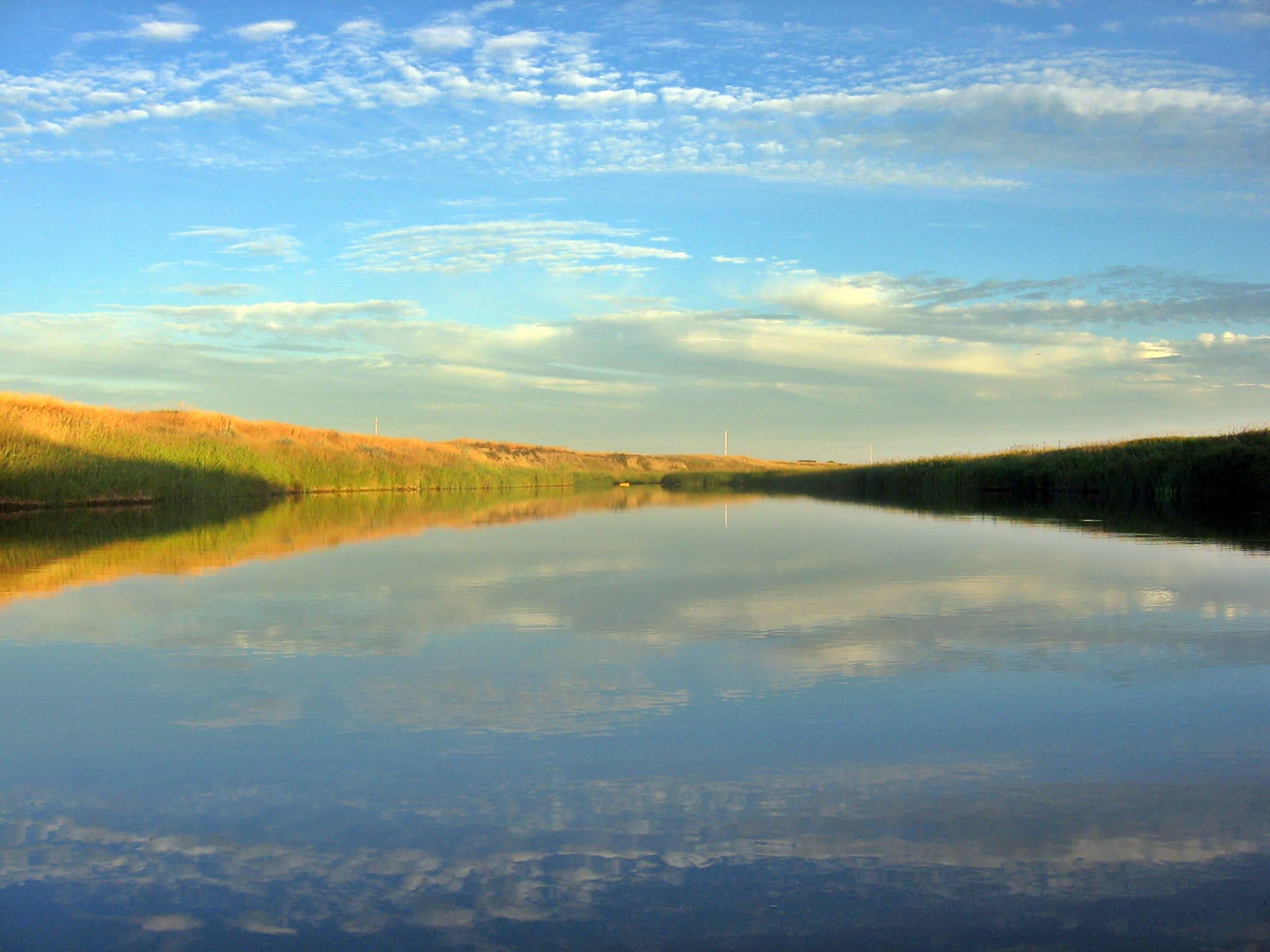

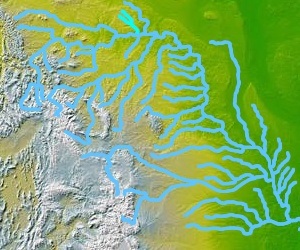
- Poplar River shown highlighted

Location
- Countries: Canada; United States
- Province: Saskatchewan
- State: Montana
- Counties: Roosevelt, MT; Daniels, MT

Physical characteristics
- Source
  - location: Wood Mountain Hills
  - coordinates: 49°15′13″N 106°23′32″W
- Mouth
  - coordinates: 48°05′03″N 105°11′08″W
  - elevation: 1,942 ft (592 m)
- Length: 167 mi (269 km)
- Discharge
  - location: Near Poplar, MT
  - average: 122 cu ft/s (3.5 m^{3}/s)

Basin features
- River system: Missouri River
- Tributaries
  - left: East Poplar River
  - right: West Poplar River

Poplar River is a tributary of the Missouri River, approximately 167 miles (269 km) long in Saskatchewan in Canada and Montana in the United States. The river is composed of three main forks – West, Middle, and East Poplar Rivers – that have their source in the Wood Mountain Hills of the Missouri Coteau. Along the river's Middle Fork in Saskatchewan, there is a coal-fired power station. There are also dams built along the river's forks.

Along with the Milk River and Big Muddy Creek, it is one of three waterways in Canada that drain into the Gulf of Mexico.

== Description ==
Poplar River and its main forks of West, Middle, and East Poplar Rivers begin in the Wood Mountain Hills in Saskatchewan. West Poplar River rises near Killdeer, Saskatchewan, and flows south-east, into north-eastern Montana, past Richland and across Daniels County. On the Saskatchewan side of the West Poplar River in the RM of Old Post No. 43, there is the West Poplar Dam (49.1906°N 106.4415°W). It is 9.9 m (32 ft) high, was built in 1957, and is owned and operated by the Saskatchewan Water Security Agency. It impounds the 1,196 dam^{3} (970 acre⋅ft) Devils Lake reservoir. Poplar River (Middle fork) rises north-west of Rockglen, Saskatchewan, and flows south-east, into north-eastern Montana, and passes west of Scobey. The two forks unite in the northern part of Fort Peck Indian Reservation. The combined river flows south-east, then south-southwest, and joins the Missouri River near Poplar.

The East Poplar River begins south of Willow Bunch, Saskatchewan, and flows south out of the hills and meets the Poplar River in Montana, upstream from where the West Poplar River meets it. Along the course of the East Poplar River, on the Canadian side of the border, is Poplar River Power Station, which is a coal-fired station owned by SaskPower. Morrison Dam was built along the river in 1977 to provide cooling water for the station. Girard Creek, which originates at Fife Lake, and East Poplar River are the primary inflows for the Morrison Dam Reservoir.

== Variant names ==
The Poplar River has also been known as: Lost Child Creek and Middle Fork Poplar River.

== See also ==
- List of rivers of Saskatchewan
- List of rivers of Montana
- List of tributaries of the Missouri River
