= Rockglen =

Town in Saskatchewan, Canada

- Nickname: Fully Modern
- Location of Rockglen in Saskatchewan Rockglen (Canada)
- Coordinates: 49°11′0″N 105°57′0″W
- Country: Canada
- Incorporated: 1927

Government
  - Mayor: Erwin Jackson
  - Member of Legislative Assembly: Dave Marit (SKP)
  - Member of Parliament: Jeremy Patzer (CPC)

Area
  - Total: 2.85 km^{2} (1.10 sq mi)

Population (2011)
  - Total: 400
  - Density: 140.4/km^{2} (364/sq mi)
- Time zone: UTC−6 (Central Standard Time)
- Highways: Highway 18; Highway 2
- Website: https://rockglensk.ca/

Rockglen is a town in the Burning Hills of the Wood Mountain Uplands, in Saskatchewan, Canada. It offers various amenities including a school, community hall, public library and five parks, as well a local service industry. The municipal office of the Rural Municipality of Poplar Valley No. 12 lies within the boundaries of Rockglen, and Rockglen businesses are supported primarily by agriculture. In the Burning Hills agriculture consists of dry land farming and cattle. Rockglen is located along Highway 2 south of Assiniboia, Highway 18 west of Coronach, and Highways 2 and 18 north of Port Poplar River. Fife Lake is 9.3 kilometres (5.8 mi) to the east.

== History ==
Vestiges from before the last ice age, a land of hidden treasures, petrified wood and fossils, hammers and arrows of the Assiniboine, Plains Cree, and Blackfoot peoples. But it is the followers of Sitting Bull who left one of the strongest impressions. Following the Battle of Little Bighorn 5,000 Lakota Sioux Lakota fled to the Wood Mountain Uplands where they were under the jurisdiction of the North-West Mounted Police under the command of Major James Morrow Walsh. The hills, first surveyed by the Henry Youle Hind expedition in 1858, were used for hunting by day, and at night fires could be seen of meat being smoked. In 1879 the U.S. Cavalry set fires in Montana that spread and burned the grasslands of Rockglen, causing the ensuing famine and leading to the toponym "The Burning Hills".

It is in these Burning Hills where the Ferbane ranch was located. By 1910 the homestead became a post office, soon German and Austro-Hungarian settlers built homesteads out of tar paper shacks and sod huts. Wood building were built for businesses, such as the pool hall, which also contained the Wesley Methodist church, which became the Wesley United Church of Canada in 1925; Valley City became an unofficial community.

To the north the Kent homestead became a post office in 1915. Soon thereafter Beromé Prefontaine built a store and by 1917 Joeville, named for Joseph Prefontaine, was founded as a village. In 1926 Joeville was a prosperous community when the Canadian Pacific Railway constructed a rail line south from Assiniboia, Saskatchewan. The Saskatchewan Wheat Pool and Alberta Pacific both built elevators along the line. Joeville split into the French community of Liseux near the new elevators and 26 buildings were moved south to the new CPR junction near Valley City. Valley City was relocated north of the tracks and incorporated as the Village of Rockglen in 1927.

Services were soon established in the tiny village. Mr. Sproul ran a school out of the Pinking Hotel on Centre Street. It was a community effort with desks and blackboards furnished by local carpenters and fundraising organized by Mr. Sproul. To the relief of Centre Street commerce a proper school house was built in 1928. It had three rooms: Mr. Preston as principal and two classes instructed by Miss Campbell and Miss Jarvis. In 1929 the Red Cross built a hospital, and a permanent post office was built, as was a branch of the Imperial Bank of Canada, and Charlie Switallo’s hardware store, which was the longest running Rockglen business to date.

Electric lighting was provided from 1929–1950 by the Rockglen Power Company, which ran every day from dusk to midnight, when three flashes indicated shut down. It wasn’t until 1950 when the Saskatchewan Power Corporation came to Rockglen that full 24-hour 120- and 240-volt electric service came to Rockglen.

The depression caused rural decline which was furthered by mechanization of agriculture during the later stages and in the time following the Second World War. Nearby Constance and Strathcona were dissolved and the one-room rural school houses were replaced by a system of buses and Bombardier tracked vehicles for winter use. Rockglen grew to a population of 500 persons when incorporated as a town with L. J. Bolster elected the first mayor. During the 1960s a new school was constructed, as well as a new post office, school office, Imperial Bank of Canada, and hotel.

The late 1970s saw a rise of inflation, combined with exceptionally high grain prices; many farmers retired and moved into Rockglen. In 1975 construction began on the Poplar River Power Station in nearby Coronach commissioned in 1981. 1981 also saw the construction of a new Saskatchewan Wheat Pool elevator. This is currently the last elevator in Rockglen and is owned by Poplar Valley Producers Co-operative. The resulting population influx had led to development of homes along Second Avenue and construction of Hillcrest Drive. To date, these are the newest housing developments in Rockglen.

Since the 1970s residents of the area have claimed sightings of a humanoid figure, similar to a Bigfoot or Sasquatch, living near or on "Columbus" (a hill within the town). It has been described as ape-like in appearance and standing between 8 and 10 feet tall with a shrill voice and skunk-like in fragrance. Locals have named the creature "Zoobey" sometimes spelled "Zoobie" or shortened to "Zoobs". A small number of Rockglenites known as "The Zoob Troob" follow news regarding the creature and circulate a limited number, biannual newsletter called "The Zoobey Sask-watch". Some believe efforts have been made to cover up the existence of Zoobey while others believe the creature does not exist and claim never to have heard of it.

== Current government ==
As a town Rockglen has a mayor fulfilling executive duties and a town council to pass bylaws. At present His Worship, Erwin Jackson is mayor. The judicial role is fulfilled by the provincial government in accordance with the Municipal Act.

== Demographics ==
In the 2021 Census of Population conducted by Statistics Canada, Rockglen had a population of 399 living in 199 of its 237 total private dwellings, a change of −9.5% from its 2016 population of 441. With a land area of 2.65 km^{2} (1.02 sq mi), it had a population density of 150.6/km^{2} (390.0/sq mi) in 2021.

== Economy ==
Rockglen provides services to surrounding farms, ranches, feedlots, and employees of the Poplar River power station and nearby Poplar River Mine, in addition to a significant retirement population.

The only light industry, though it too could be considered a service, is that of Nielson's Welding along Highway #2. The largest economic contributor is the Rockglen Co-op, which is the largest co-op south of Assiniboia, Saskatchewan, and through sales of products such as lumber to Montana cattlemen attracts a significant amount of foreign business.

Rail transit was privately owned by the Canadian Pacific Railway until a shortline was taken over by Southern Rails Cooperative in 2006; Rockglen is now a transfer point between Southern Rails Cooperative and the Canadian Pacific Railway.

== Transportation ==
- The Town of Rockglen is a part owner of the Fife Lake Railway.
- Rockglen Airport (CKC7) is 2.2 kilometres (1.4 mi) east of town.

== Sports teams ==
- Nighthawks, hockey
- Rockglen Raiders, Saskatchewan High Schools Athletics Association

== Notable people ==
- Miriam Mandel - 1973 Governor General's Award-winning poet.
- John "Jack" Wolfe - Member of the Legislative Assembly (1988–1991)

== See also ==
- List of towns in Saskatchewan
- List of francophone communities in Saskatchewan
- List of communities in Saskatchewan
