= Rural Municipality of Poplar Valley No. 12 =

Rural municipality in Saskatchewan, Canada

Poplar Valley No. 12
- Rural municipality
- Rural Municipality of Poplar Valley No. 12

- Location of the RM of Poplar Valley No. 12 in Saskatchewan
- Coordinates: 49.216°N 105.855°W
- Country: Canada
- Province: Saskatchewan
- Census division: 3
- SARM division: 2
- Federal riding: Cypress Hills--Grasslands
- Provincial riding: Wood River
- Formed: January 1, 1913

Government
  - Reeve: Nairn Nielsen
  - Governing body: RM of Poplar Valley No. 12 Council
  - Administrator: Lynn Fisher
  - Office location: Rockglen

Area (2016)
  - Land: 769.37 km^{2} (297.06 sq mi)

Population (2016)
  - Total: 195
  - Density: 0.3/km^{2} (0.78/sq mi)
- Time zone: CST
  - Summer (DST): CST
- Postal code: S0H 3R0
- Area codes: 306 and 639

The Rural Municipality of Poplar Valley No. 12 (2016 population: 195) is a rural municipality (RM) in the Canadian province of Saskatchewan within Census Division No. 3 and SARM Division No. 2. It is located in the southern portion of the province. It is adjacent to the United States border, neighbouring Daniels County in Montana.

== History ==
The RM of Poplar Valley No. 12 incorporated as a rural municipality on January 1, 1913.

== Geography ==
=== Communities and localities ===
The following urban municipalities are surrounded by the RM.

Towns

- Rockglen

The following unincorporated communities are within the RM.

Localities

- Fife Lake

The following parks are within the RM.

Regional parks

- Rockin Beach Park

== Demographics ==
Population history (1981–2016)
Year	Pop.	±%
1981	347	—
1986	325	−6.3%
1991	309	−4.9%
1996	307	−0.6%
2001	235	−23.5%
2006	245	+4.3%
2011	200	−18.4%
2016	195	−2.5%
Source: Statistics Canada via Saskatchewan Bureau of Statistics

In the 2021 Census of Population conducted by Statistics Canada, the RM of Poplar Valley No. 12 had a population of 190 living in 81 of its 105 total private dwellings, a change of −2.6% from its 2016 population of 195. With a land area of 765.28 km^{2} (295.48 sq mi), it had a population density of 0.2/km^{2} (0.6/sq mi) in 2021.

In the 2016 Census of Population, the RM of Poplar Valley No. 12 recorded a population of 195 living in 82 of its 97 total private dwellings, a −2.5% change from its 2011 population of 200. With a land area of 769.37 km^{2} (297.06 sq mi), it had a population density of 0.3/km^{2} (0.7/sq mi) in 2016.

== Government ==
The RM of Poplar Valley No. 12 is governed by an elected municipal council and an appointed administrator that meets on the second Wednesday of every month. Current reeve is Darrel Swanson, while its administrator is Lynn Fisher.

Sitting Councillors as of the 2020 election are:

- Terry Loucks - Division 1
- Kalissa Regier - Division 2
- Richard Kimball - Division 3
- Kendra Loucks - Division 4
- Brad Christopherson - Division 5
- Calvin Knoss - Division 6

== Transportation ==
- The RM is a part owner of the Fife Lake Railway.
- Rockglen Airport
- Highway 2
- Highway 18

== See also ==
- List of rural municipalities in Saskatchewan
