= Poplar River Power Station =

Power station in Saskatchewan, Canada

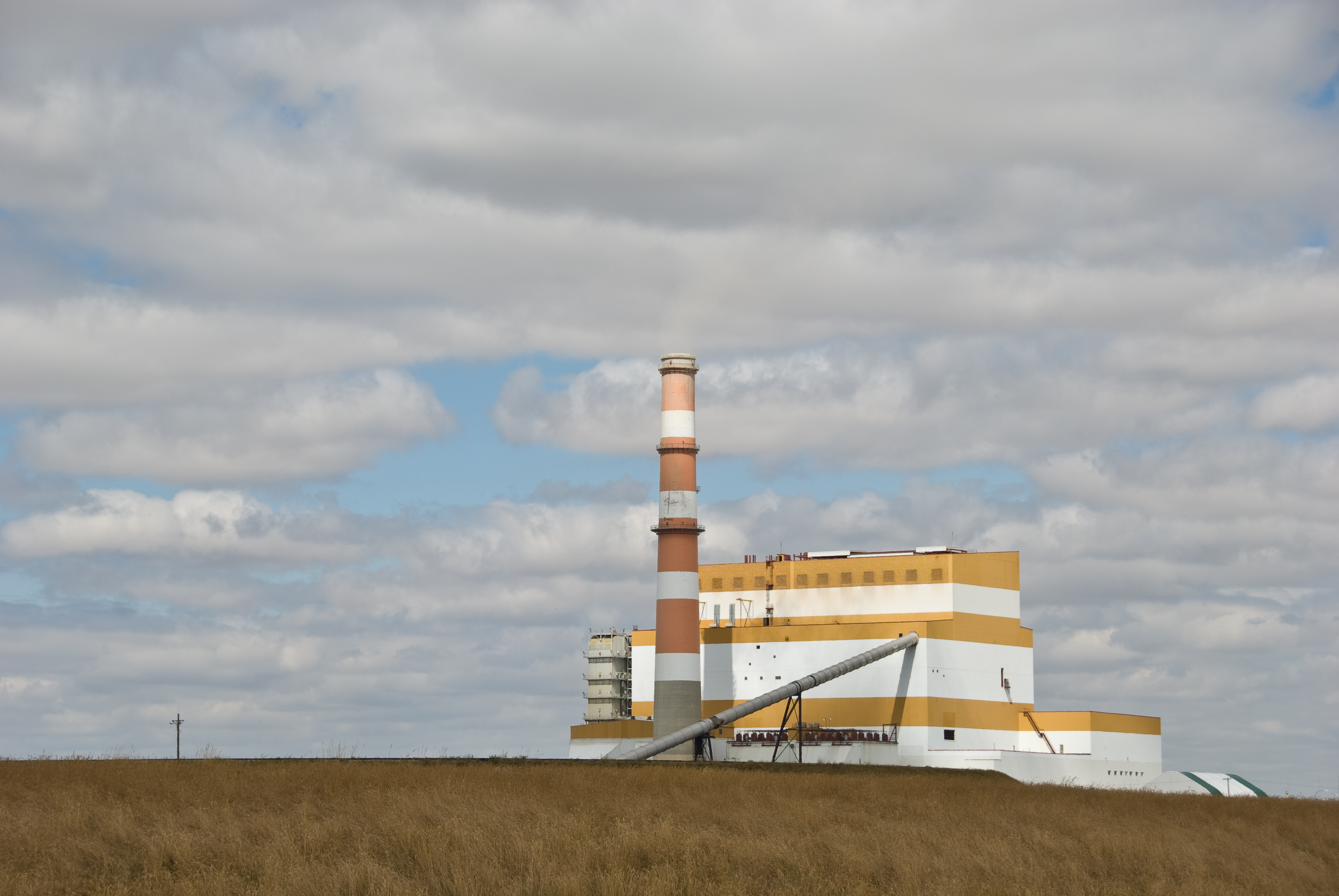
- Poplar River Power Station
- Country: Canada
- Location: RM of Hart Butte No. 11, near Coronach, Saskatchewan
- Coordinates: 49°3′28″N 105°29′05″W
- Status: Operational
- Commission date: 1981
- Owner: SaskPower

Thermal power station
- Primary fuel: Coal (Lignite)
- Turbine technology: Steam turbine

Power generation
- Nameplate capacity: 630 Gross MW

Poplar River Power Station is a coal-fired station owned by SaskPower, located near Coronach, Saskatchewan, Canada, approximately 8 kilometres (5.0 mi) from the Canada–US border.

The project to build the station was launched in the fall of 1974, with the Morrison Dam being constructed between 1975 and 1977 to provide cooling water for the station. Morrison Dam was built along the course of the East Poplar River. Work on the powerhouse began in 1975. The single stack is 122 metres (400 ft) in height. The lignite used to power the station is supplied from Westmoreland Mining's Poplar River Coal Mine.

SaskPower planned on shutting down the power station by 2030. The October 2025 First Energy Security Strategy and Supply Plan indicates a life extension is being investigated that could see the facility run until 2050.

== Description ==
The Poplar River Power Station consists of:

- one 291 net MW unit (commissioned in 1981)
- one 291 net MW unit (commissioned in 1983)

The boilers are supplied by Combustion Engineering and Babcock & Wilcox. The turbines and generators are supplied by Hitachi.

The power station was originally planned to have four 300MW units. One of the limiting factors in building a power station of that size was the water supply. To obtain enough water for four generating units, SaskPower was considering diverting other water sources towards the East Fork of the Poplar River from as far away as Lake Diefenbaker.

Fuel from strip mines about 20 kilometres (12 mi) to the north is delivered by the Poplar River Mine Railway.

== SaskPower's Emissions Control Research Facility (ECRF) ==
The SaskPower's Emissions Control Research Facility (ECRF), is located at the Poplar River Power Station and has the mandate to evaluate various technologies for controlling emissions. The station has been instrumented to provide real-time sampling of flue gasses. The ECRF facility was decommissioned in 2019.

== See also ==
- List of generating stations in Saskatchewan
