= Rock Creek (Clark Fork River tributary) =

River in Montana, United States

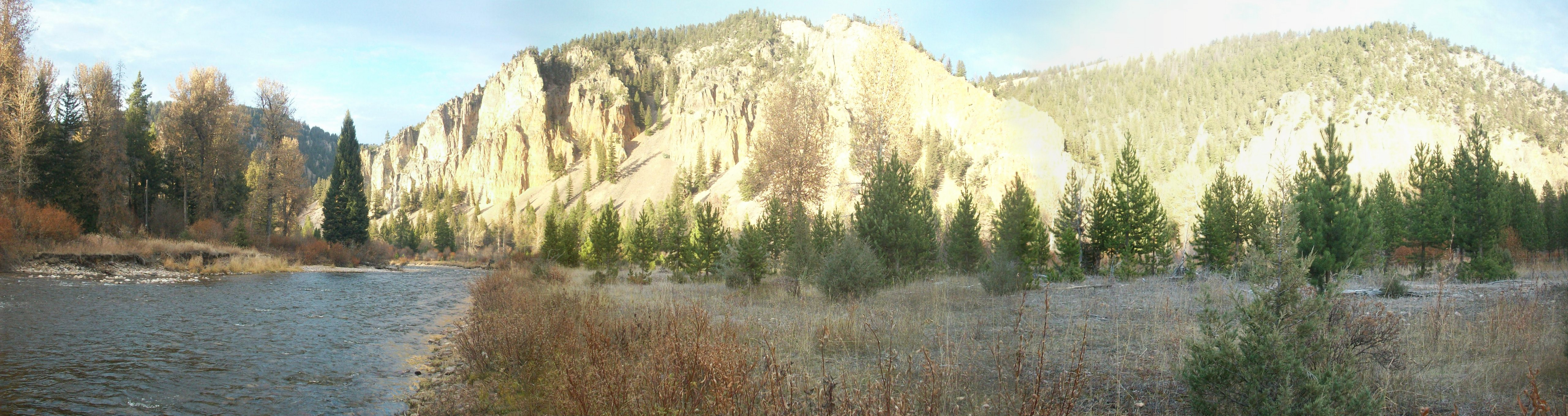

Physical characteristics
- Source
  - coordinates: 46°13′26″N 113°31′21″W
- Mouth
  - coordinates: 46°43′31″N 113°41′02″W
  - elevation: 3,520 feet (1,070 m)
- Length: 52 mi (84 km)

Basin features
- River system: Columbia River

Rock Creek is a 52-mile (84 km) river in Missoula and Granite County, Montana. Rock Creek is a tributary of the Clark Fork River. The river's headwaters are in Lolo National Forest near Phillipsburg, Montana. The river roughly parallels the Sapphire Mountains and enters the Clark Fork of the Columbia River near Clinton, Montana. Sapphires are found along the river.

== Angling ==
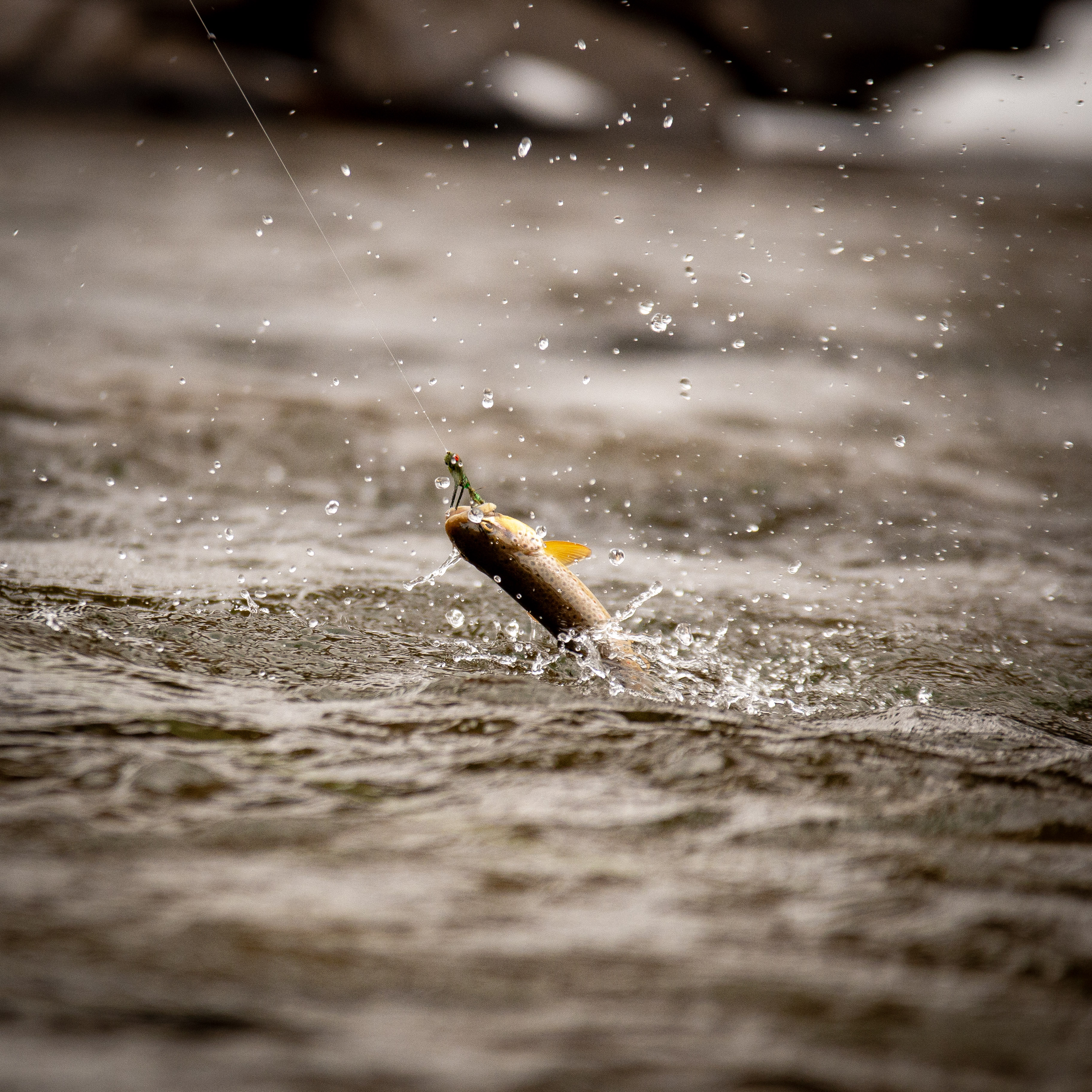
Trout leaps out of the water (streamer fishing)

Rock Creek is a popular fly fishing river for locals and destination anglers. It contains rainbow, brown, westslope cutthroat and the threatened bull trout.

== Bird-watching ==
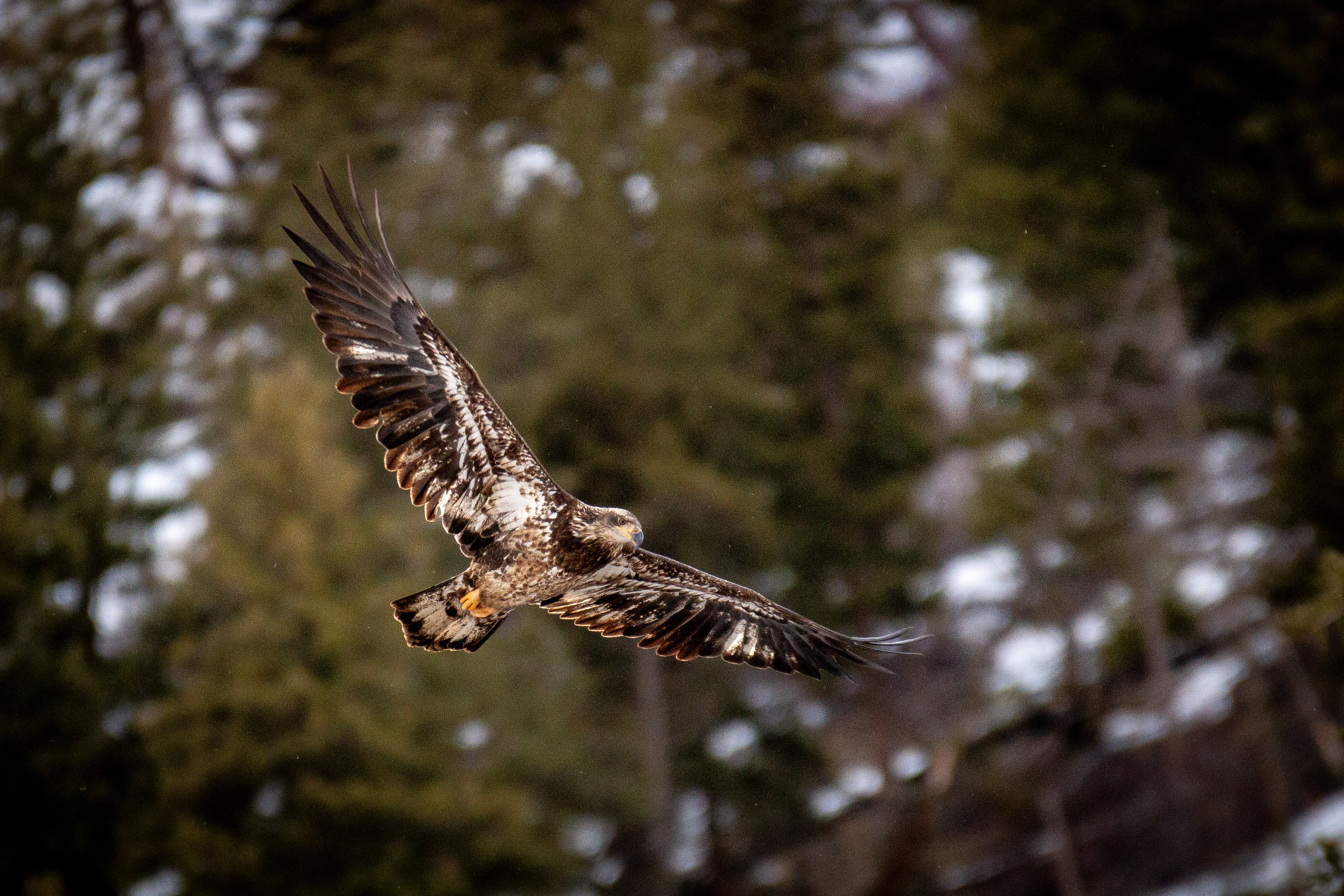
A Bald Eagle (juvenile) soars over the Rock Creek Microburst Viewing Site

Due to its range of habitats, Rock Creek is filled with bird life. Rafting down the river, American dippers, killdeer, and osprey can be seen. Hiking through the forest, an array of woodpeckers and the occasional grouse have been reported. Bald eagle frequent the river all year round and can be seen waiting patiently for fish in snags or on the ground. Their huge nests — such as the one visible near Morgan Case — can be seen from a long ways away. One of the best places to view birds is the Rock Creek Microburst Viewing Site. More information can be found at eBird (Granite County).

== Non-bird wildlife ==
Bighorn Sheep, both species of deer, elk, and moose are hoofed animals that roam the Rock Creek wilderness. At the Spring Creek Sheep Viewing Site, bighorn sheep can be seen hobbling around the cliffs or grazing in the nearby residential areas. Deer are everywhere along the road and can be seen throughout the entire area. The area's elk and moose population is quite elusive, so finding one is a real treat. The predators of Rock Creek include mountain lions, red foxes, and black bears but others have been reported.

== See also ==
- List of rivers of Montana
- Rock Creek (Clarks Fork Yellowstone River tributary)
- Rock Creek (Saskatchewan–Montana), a tributary of Milk River
