= Fife Lake Railway =

Railway line in Saskatchewan, Canada

Overview
- Headquarters: Willow Bunch, Saskatchewan
- Reporting mark: FLR
- Locale: Saskatchewan
- Dates of operation: 2006–

Technical
- Track gauge: 4 ft 8 1/2 in (1,435 mm) standard gauge

The Fife Lake Railway (reporting mark FLR) is a Canadian shortline railway company operating on trackage in Saskatchewan, Canada. The railway is owned by seven local municipalities. The Fife Lake Railway took over the former Canadian Pacific Railway Fife Lake subdivision consisting of 94 km of trackage.

The owners of the railway include Hart Butte No. 11, Poplar Valley No. 12, Willow Bunch No. 42, Old Post No. 43, Stonehenge No. 73, Coronach, Rockglen and Great Western Railway.

Great Western Railway operates trains on behalf of the Fife Lake Railway.
