= Rock Creek Badlands =

Badlands in southern Saskatchewan, Canada

Rock Creek Badlands Killdeer Badlands
- Badlands
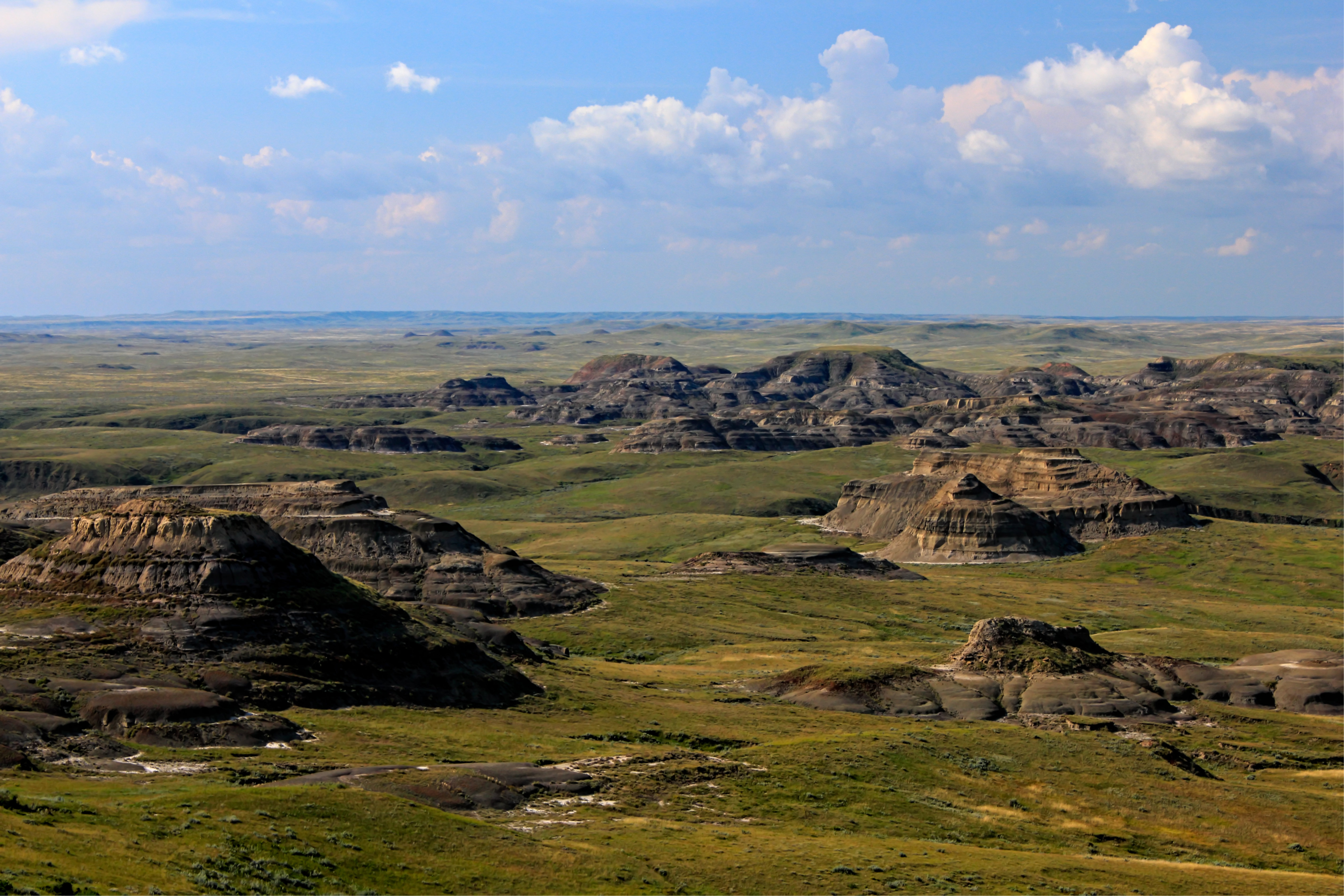
- Rock Creek Badlands

- Location of Rock Creek Badlands in Saskatchewan Rock Creek Badlands (Canada)
- Coordinates: 49.058°N 106.541°W
- Location: Grasslands National Park, Saskatchewan, Canada
- Part of: Wood Mountain Hills
- Water bodies: Rock Creek; Hellfire Creek
- Formed by: Glacial meltwater

Rock Creek Badlands, also known as Killdeer Badlands, are badlands in southern Saskatchewan, Canada. They are located on the southern slopes of the Wood Mountain Hills in the East Block of Grasslands National Park. The badlands were formed over 10,000 years ago by meltwaters from retreating glaciers. It is one of the first places in Canada where fossils were found. The East Block and the badlands are one of the few relatively untouched places left on the prairies.

Tourist attractions in the badlands include a scenic drive, hiking, wildlife viewing, and fossil hunting. Access to the East Block of the park is from a gravel road that branches off Highway 18. The gravel road leads to Rock Creek Campground, which is where the main access points to Rock Creek Badlands are.

== Description ==
The Rock Creek Badlands were formed over 10,000 years ago near the end of the last ice age. Meltwater from the glaciers carved out the valleys, coulees, formations, and buttes of the badlands. The erosion revealed millions of years of geological history, including the 66-million-year-old K–Pg boundary. The boundary, which is known to harbour dinosaur fossils, is visible in various rock formations, such as the hoodoos. In 1874, the first dinosaur fossil in Western Canada was discovered here.

The Rock Creek Badlands are within the Rock Creek watershed. Rock Creek's headwaters are in the Wood Mountain Hills and its mouth is just north of Hinsdale, Montana, on the Milk River in the Missouri River drainage basin. The badlands extend southward towards the Montana border.

Features within the badlands include the Valley of 1000 Devils and the Red Buttes. Due to the effects of wind, rain, animals, and people, the landscape is continually changing and eroding.

== Valley of 1000 Devils ==
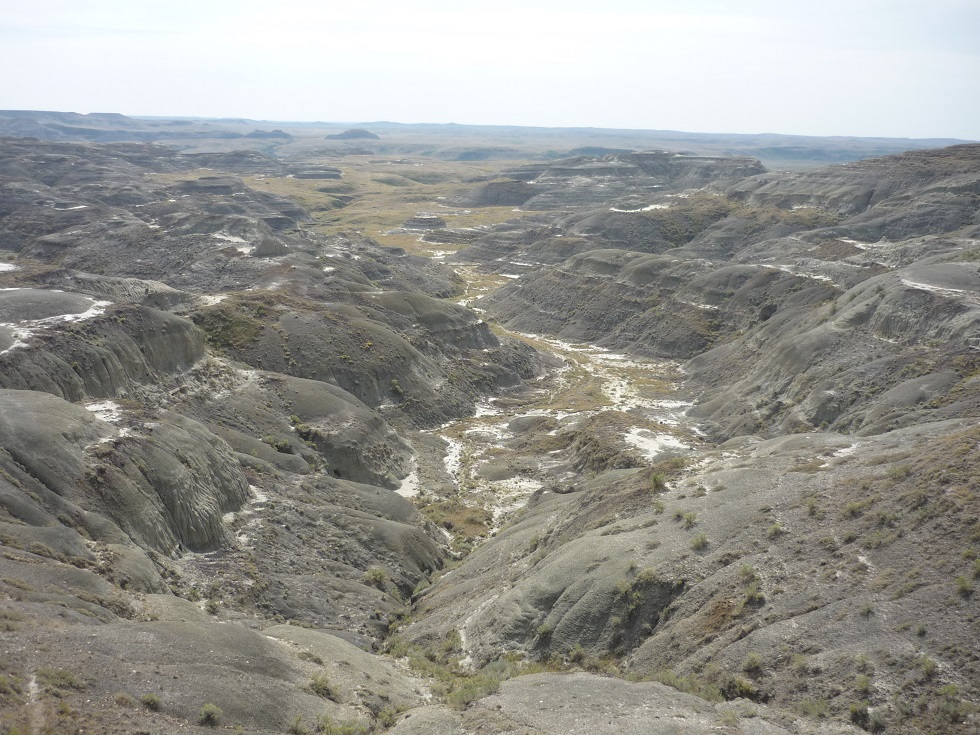
Valley of 1000 Devils

The Valley of 1000 Devils (49.0708°N 106.5308°W) is within the Rock Creek Badlands. The valley covers an area of about 800 hectares (2,000 acres) and is part of the Hellfire Creek watershed. Hellfire Creek is a tributary of Rock Creek. The Valley of 1000 Devils has hoodoos, grasslands, coulees, buttes, and various rock formations. Due to being sheltered from the wind the and the ground being composed of heat-absorbing clay, the temperature of the valley is often 10°C warmer than the surrounding landscape.

The Valley of 1000 Devils was named in 1963. In that year, Carl Anderson, the reeve of the local rural municipality and local rancher, took Erla Burton — the new administrator's mother — for an off-road tour of the badlands. Not impressed, Burton said, "Who in their right mind would live in a valley of a thousand devils?" The name stuck. When the badlands became part of Grasslands National Park, Parks Canada continued its use.

== Recreation ==
There is a parkway for tourists that runs along the edge of the badlands. The parkway has several pullouts with scenic views. There are also several hiking trails that go into the badlands, including the Rock Creek Trail, Creek to Peak Trail, Valley of 1000 Devils Trail, and the Red Buttes Trail. Access to the badlands is from Rock Creek Campground in Grasslands National Park.

In the mid 2010s, Parks Canada built an 11-kilometre (6.8 mi) long paved parkway that meanders through the grasslands and parts of the badlands. There are 20 pullouts that provide views of the badlands and open prairie. Part of the road follows an historic trail.

In August 2021, Parks Canada opened up an 11-kilometre (6.8 mi) long marked trail through the Valley of 1000 Devils and Hellfire Creek basin. Prior to that, hikers had to follow unmarked trails. The trail, which was opened without much fanfare, has a trailhead sign and white markers placed roughly every 100 metres (330 ft). The trail, which has a 194-metre (636 ft) elevation gain, traverses the valley, grasslands, hoodoos, coulees, and other rock formations.

The Red Buttes trail is a difficult 16-kilometre (9.9 mi) long hike that traverses the buttes, coulees, and creek beds. The red colour of the buttes is from "oxidized ion carbonate activity".

== Flora and fauna ==
The Rock Creek Badlands are in the mixed grass prairie ecozone. "The unique formations of land and climate have created niches for rare plants, birds and animals". Some of the animals found there include the prairie rattlesnake, pronghorn, black-tailed prairie dog, burrowing owl, sage grouse, ferruginous hawk, and the short-horned lizard.

== See also ==
- Geography of Saskatchewan
- Tourism in Saskatchewan
