= Rural Municipality of Hart Butte No. 11 =

Rural municipality in Saskatchewan, Canada

Hart Butte No. 11
- Rural municipality
- Rural Municipality of Hart Butte No. 11

- Location of the RM of Hart Butte No. 11 in Saskatchewan
- Coordinates: 49.142°N 105.474°W
- Country: Canada
- Province: Saskatchewan
- Census division: 3
- SARM division: 2
- Federal riding: Souris—Moose Mountain
- Provincial riding: Wood River
- Formed: January 1, 1913

Government
  - Reeve: Craig Eger
  - Governing body: RM of Hart Butte No. 11 Council
  - Administrator: Leanne Totton
  - Office location: Coronach

Area (2016)
  - Land: 841.98 km^{2} (325.09 sq mi)

Population (2016)
  - Total: 252
  - Density: 0.3/km^{2} (0.78/sq mi)
- Time zone: CST
  - Summer (DST): CST
- Postal code: S0H 0Z0
- Area codes: 306 and 639

The Rural Municipality of Hart Butte No. 11 (2016 population: 252) is a rural municipality (RM) in the Canadian province of Saskatchewan within Census Division No. 3 and SARM Division No. 2. Located in the south-central portion of the province, it is adjacent to the United States boundary, neighbouring Daniels County in Montana.

== History ==
The RM of Hart Butte No. 11 incorporated as a rural municipality on January 1, 1913.

== Geography ==
=== Communities and localities ===
The following urban municipalities are surrounded by the RM.

Towns

- Coronach

The following unincorporated communities are within the RM.

Localities

- Buffalo Gap
- Coronach/Scobey Border Station Airport

== Demographics ==
Population history (1981–2016)
Year	Pop.	±%
1981	470	—
1986	434	−7.7%
1991	385	−11.3%
1996	340	−11.7%
2001	311	−8.5%
2006	272	−12.5%
2011	264	−2.9%
2016	252	−4.5%
Source: Statistics Canada via Saskatchewan Bureau of Statistics

In the 2021 Census of Population conducted by Statistics Canada, the RM of Hart Butte No. 11 had a population of 263 living in 100 of its 110 total private dwellings, a change of 4.4% from its 2016 population of 252. With a land area of 839.22 km^{2} (324.02 sq mi), it had a population density of 0.3/km^{2} (0.8/sq mi) in 2021.

In the 2016 Census of Population, the RM of Hart Butte No. 11 recorded a population of 252 living in 97 of its 100 total private dwellings, a −4.5% change from its 2011 population of 264. With a land area of 841.98 km^{2} (325.09 sq mi), it had a population density of 0.3/km^{2} (0.8/sq mi) in 2016.

== Government ==
The RM of Hart Butte No. 11 is governed by an elected municipal council and an appointed administrator that meets on the second Thursday of every month. The reeve of the RM is Craig Eger while its administrator is Leanne Totton. The RM's office is located in Coronach.

== Transportation ==
The RM is a part owner of the Fife Lake Railway.

== See also ==
- List of rural municipalities in Saskatchewan
