= Grasslands National Park =

National park in Saskatchewan, Canada

- Parc national des Prairies
- IUCN category II (national park)
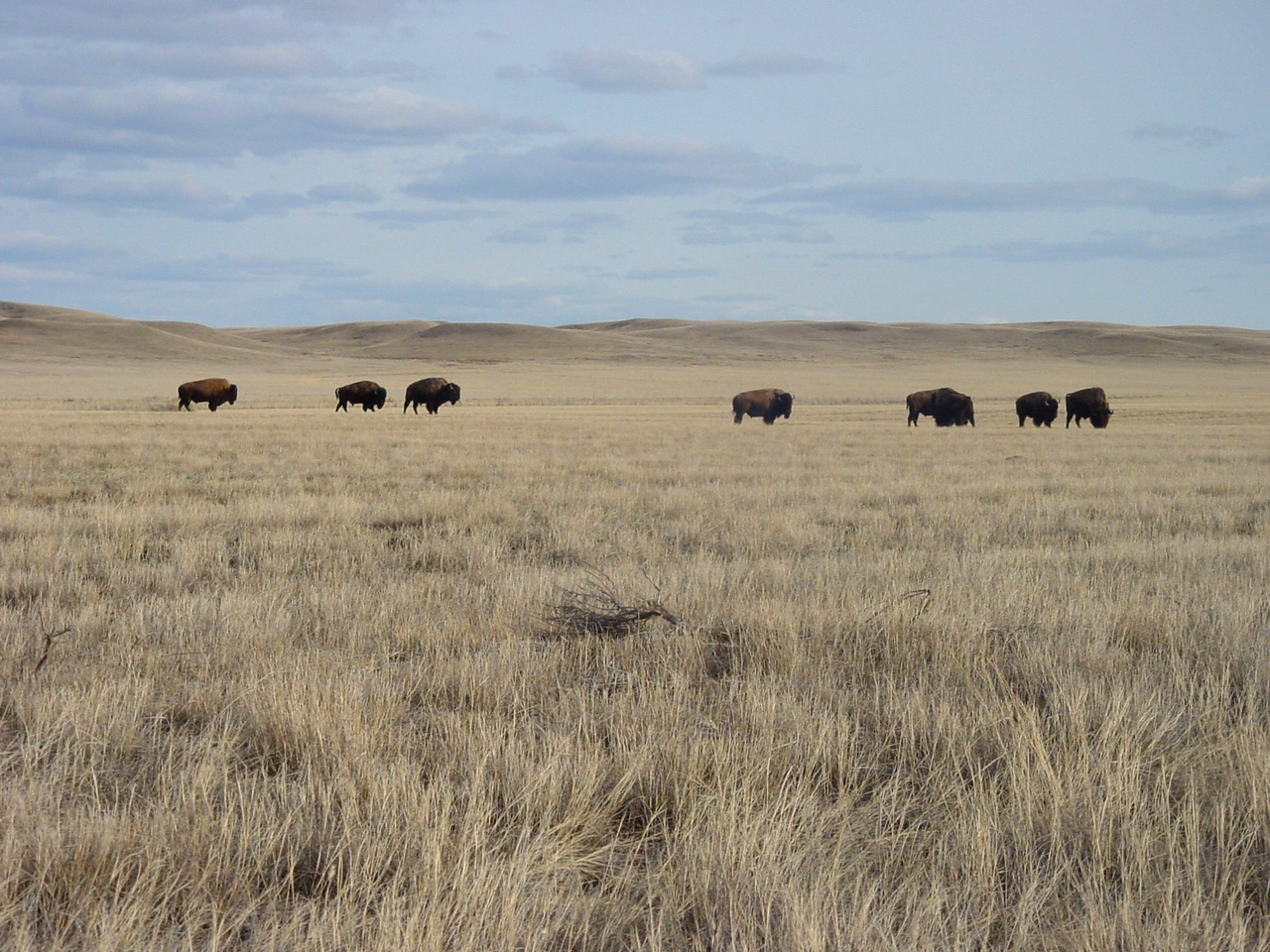
- Bison grazing in Grasslands National Park

- Location within Saskatchewan Location within Canada
- Interactive map of Grasslands National Park
- Location: RM of Val Marie No. 17, Saskatchewan, Canada
- Nearest city: Val Marie
- Coordinates: 49.15°N 107.51°W
- Area: 907 km^{2} (350 sq mi)
- Established: 1981
- Visitors: 19,656 (in 2022–23)
- Governing body: Parks Canada
- Website: Grasslands National Park

Grasslands National Park is a Canadian national park located near the village of Val Marie, Saskatchewan, and one of 44 national parks and park reserves in Canada's national park system (though one of only two in Saskatchewan itself). This national park is north of the U.S. state of Montana and lies adjacent to the international boundary. It consists of two separate parcels, the East Block and West Block.

The park was established in 1981. Prior to this the province's only national park was Prince Albert National Park. Grasslands annually receives about 12,000 visitors.

Grasslands National Park represents the Prairie Grasslands natural region, protecting one of the nation's few remaining areas of undisturbed dry mixed-grass/shortgrass prairie grassland. The park is located in the World Wildlife Fund-defined Northern short grasslands ecoregion, which spans much of southern Saskatchewan, southern Alberta, and the northern Great Plains states in the US. The unique landscape and harsh, semi-arid climate provide niches for several adapted plants and animals. The park and surrounding area house the country's only black-tailed prairie dog colonies. Fauna found in the park include bison, pronghorn, greater sage-grouse, common pheasant, burrowing owl, coyote, ferruginous hawk, swift fox, prairie rattlesnake, black-footed ferret, eastern yellow-bellied racer, and greater short-horned lizard. Flora includes blue grama grass, needlegrass, plains cottonwood and silver sagebrush. Of the top 10 bird species that are most unique to Saskatchewan, eight of these are regularly found within the park — notably Baird's sparrow, lark bunting, and greater sage-grouse, each of which are >25 times more likely to be found in Saskatchewan than in the rest of Canada.

== History ==
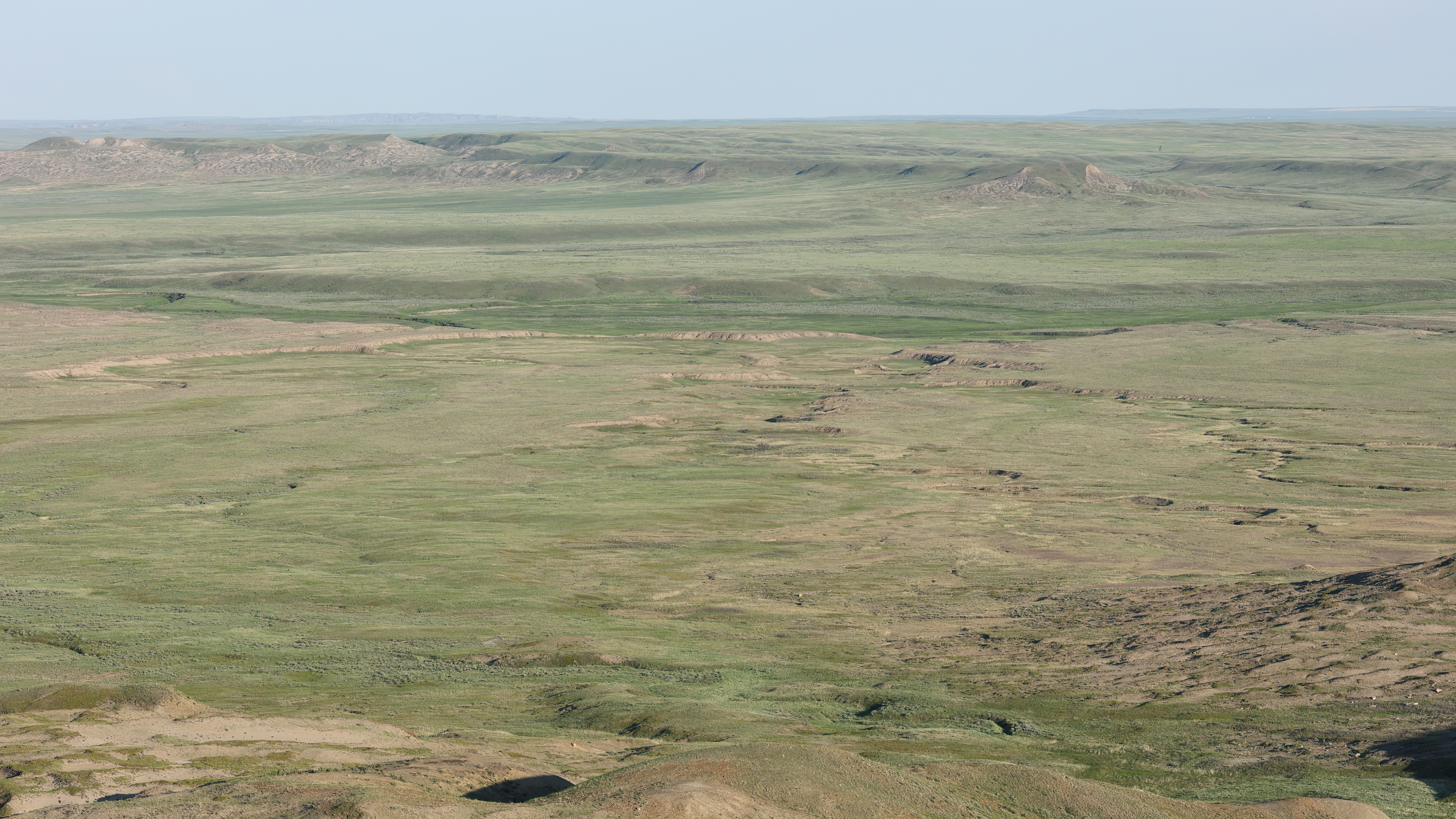
West Block viewed from the summit of 70 Mile Butte

Erosion by glacial meltwater formed many of the park's characteristic features. Highlights of the park's geological landscape include the Frenchman River Valley, the Seventy Mile Butte, and the badlands of Rock Creek.

In 1874, Sir George Mercer Dawson discovered Western Canada's first dinosaur remains in the Killdeer Badlands during the International Boundary Survey. Later, in 1877, Sitting Bull took refuge in the area with around 5,000 Sioux after the defeat of General Custer at the Battle of Little Bighorn.

Grasslands National Park is Treaty 4 land of the Blackfoot (Niitsítapi) people of the Canadian and American plains. A 2022 agreement between the Métis Nation—Saskatchewan and Parks Canada provides for the transfer of 24 bison.

== West Block ==
The West Block of the park is located one hour south of Swift Current, and the main visitor reception centre is located in the town of Val Marie. Highlights of the West Block include the Frenchman River Valley, a herd of over 300 plains bison, as well as prairie dog colonies. A 16-kilometre (10 mi) wide stretch of land on either side of the Frenchman River is an Important Bird Area of Canada called Grasslands National Park (west) (SK 024). Frenchman Valley Campground offers visitors serviced camping sites, teepee camping, and a cook shelter. Backcountry camping is also available. The West Block is located in Census Division No. 4.

In 2006, plains bison from Elk Island National Park in Alberta were reintroduced to Grasslands. By 2015, the herd had grown from the original 71 animals to over 300. The herd is maintained on a 181 km^{2} (70 sq mi) section in the park's West Block. On 2 October 2009, the Royal Astronomical Society of Canada designated Grasslands National Park a dark-sky preserve, and a small population of black-footed ferrets were reintroduced into the prairie dog towns after a 70-year absence. Improved night-lighting practices under the dark-sky agreement ensure that the park remains dark at night, preserving a natural environment for all nocturnal wildlife.

== East Block ==
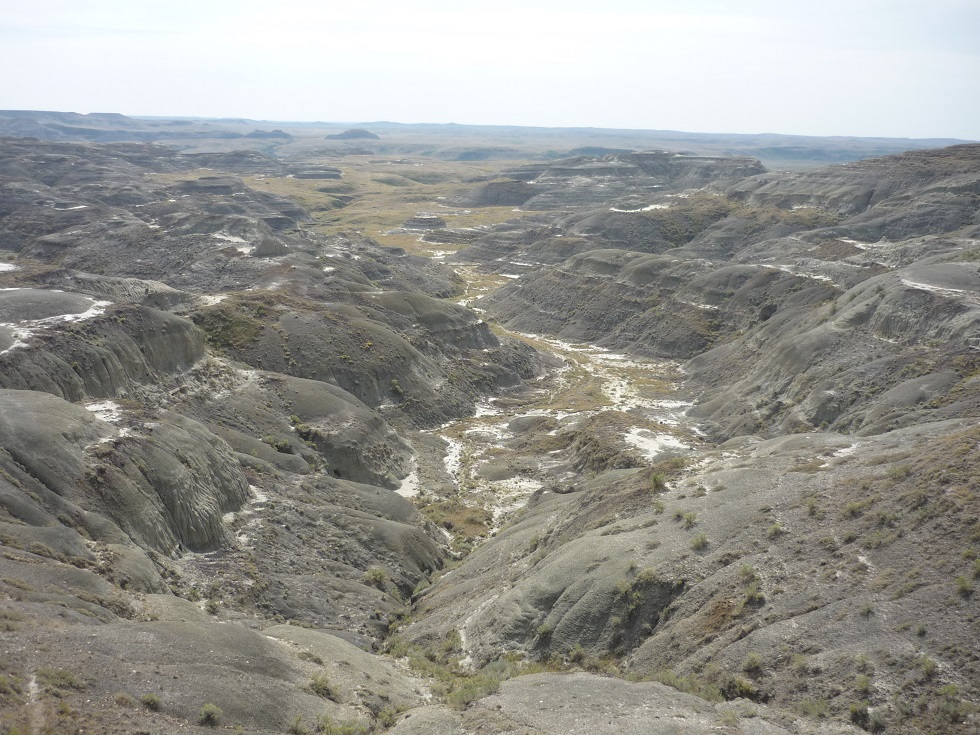
The Valley of 1000 Devils in the East Block

The East Block of the park is located about an hour's drive south of Assiniboia on the south side of the Wood Mountain Hills in Census Division No. 3. The interpretive centre is in the McGowan House at the Rock Creek Campground and the information centre is at the museum in Wood Mountain Regional Park. The East Block is more of a wilderness area but has views of the Rock Creek Badlands (also known as Killdeer Badlands), the Cretaceous–Paleogene boundary, and prairie skies. A one-lane, 11-kilometre (6.8 mi) parkway traverses the Rock Creek Badlands. The East Block contains the Grasslands National Park (east) (SK 023) Important Bird Area.

== Gallery ==
Plants of the park

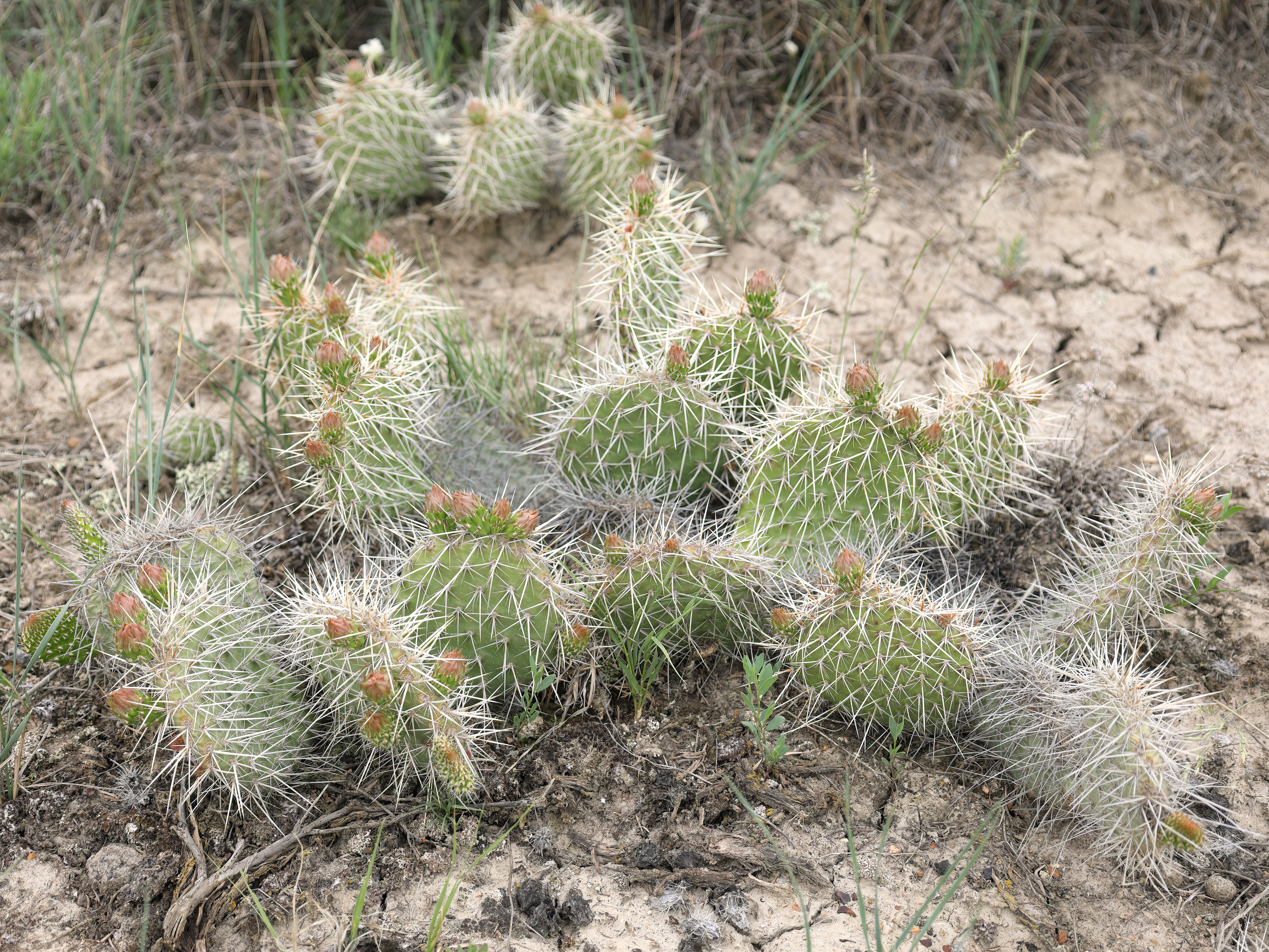
Plains prickly-pear cactus

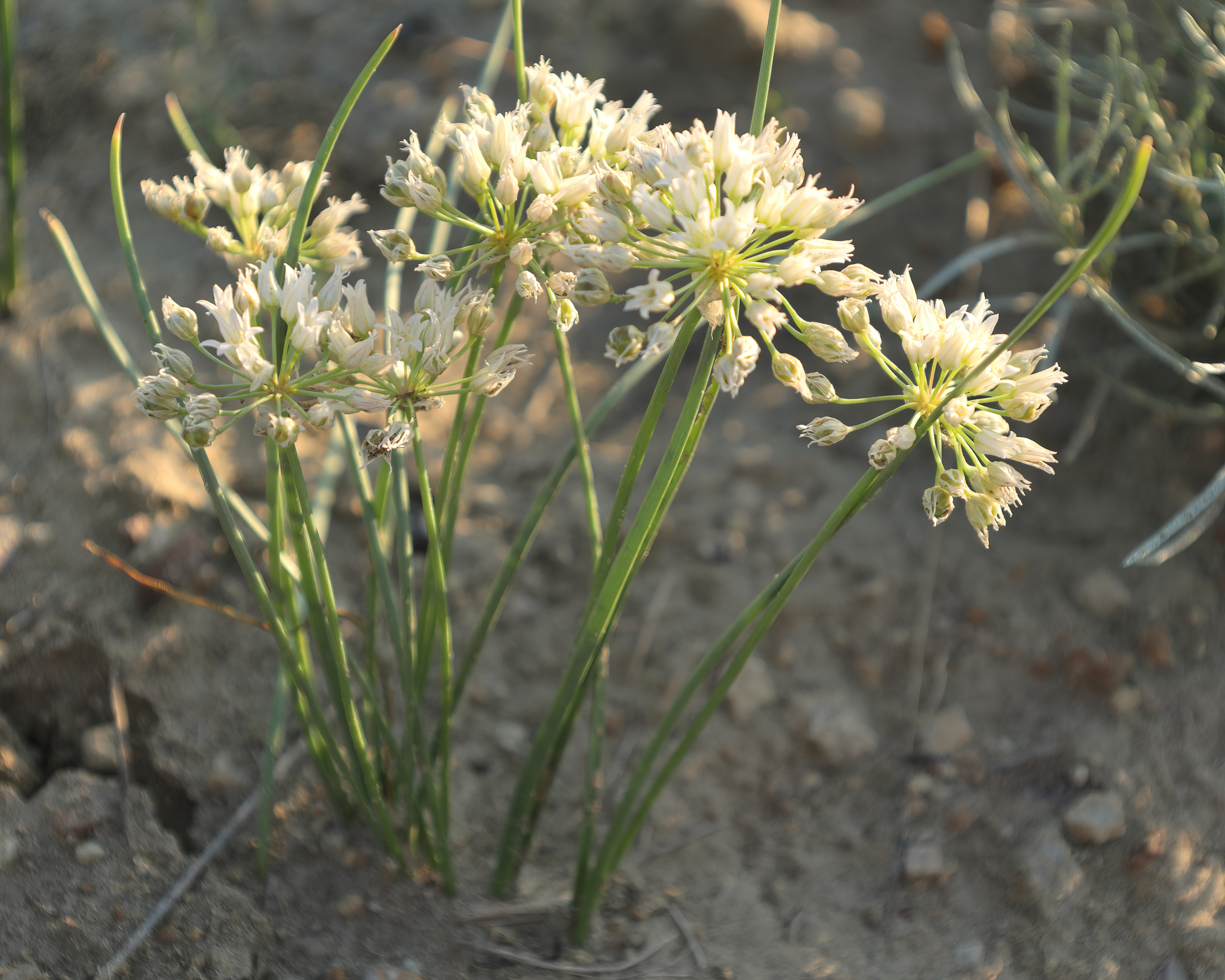
Prairie onion

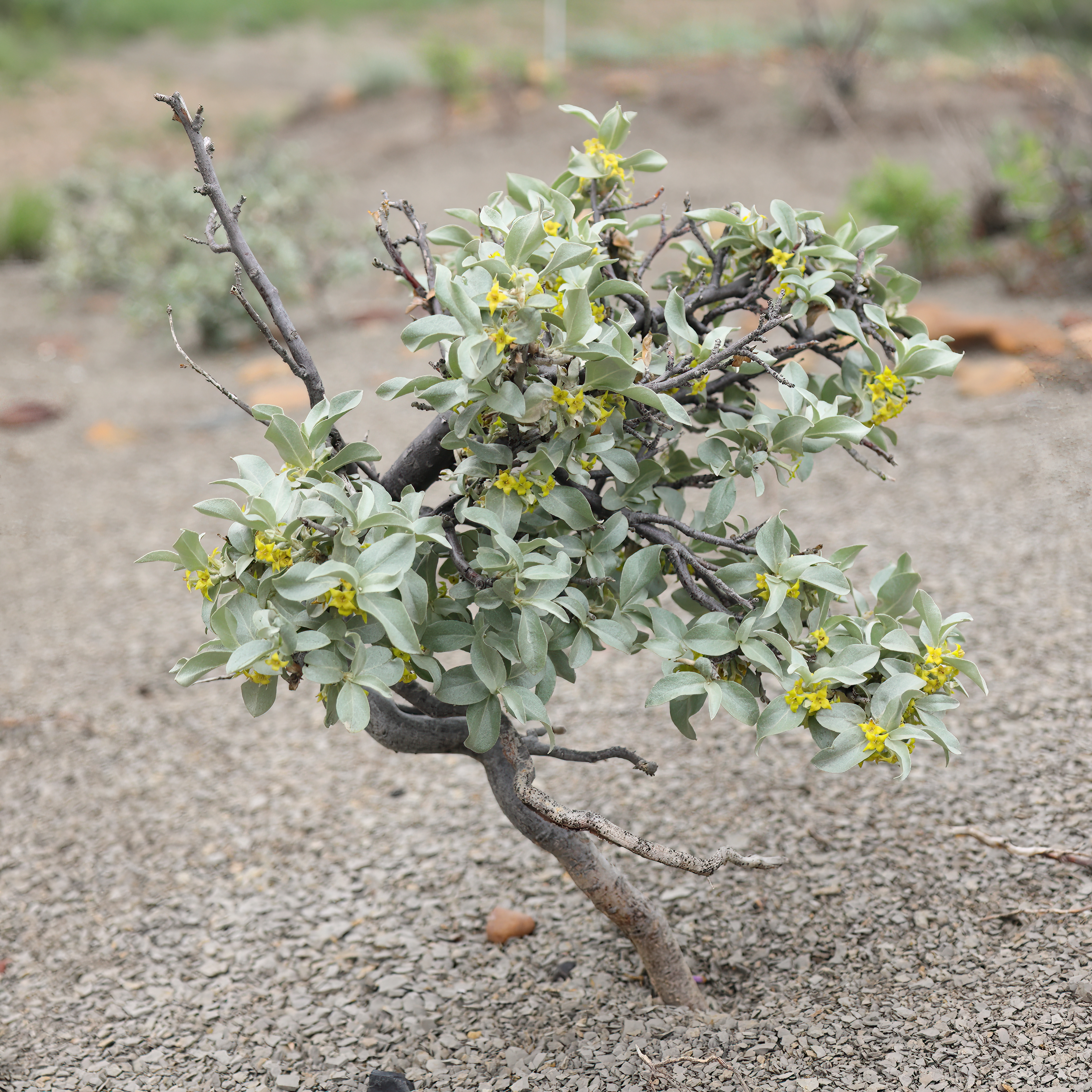
Wolf-Willow

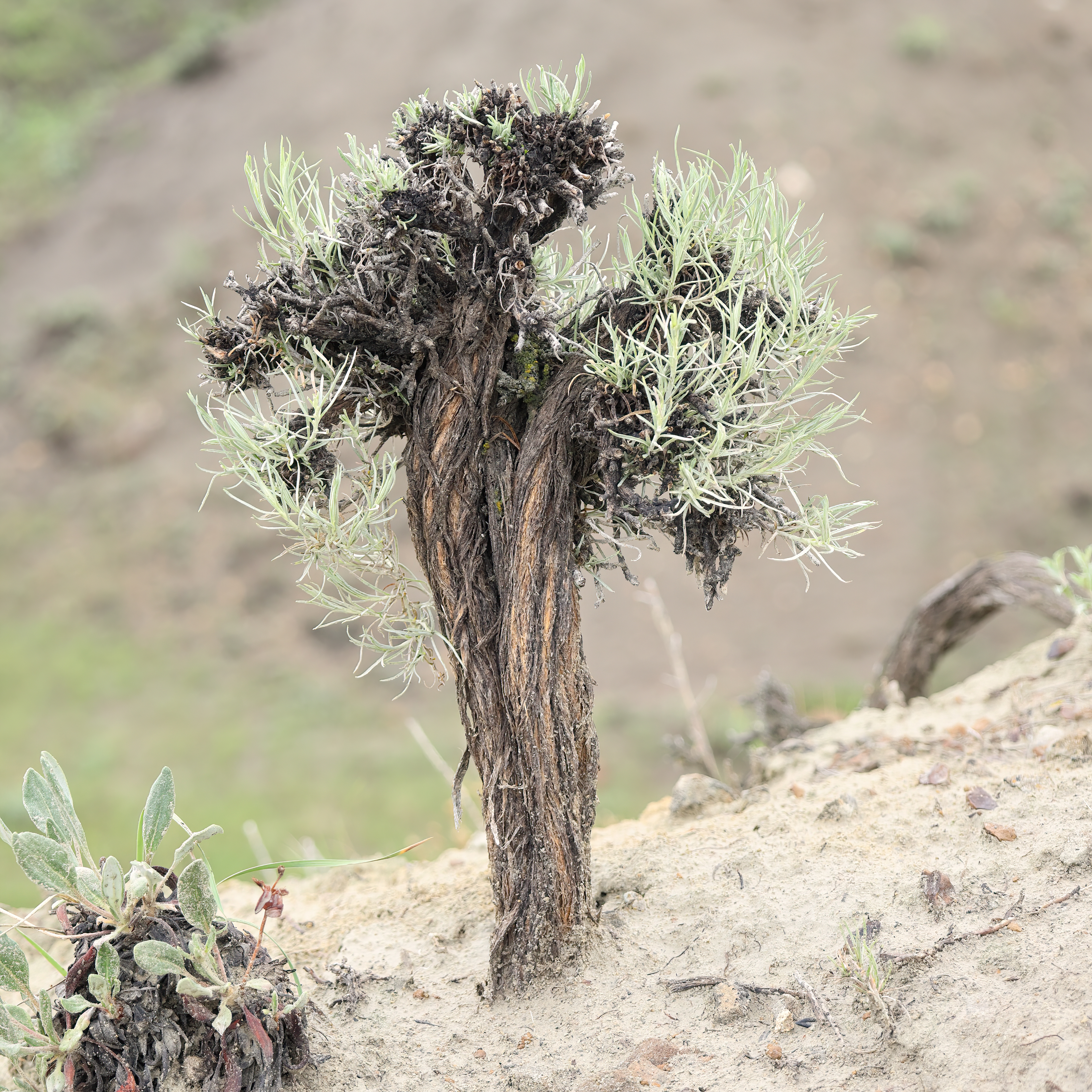
Rubber rabbitbrush

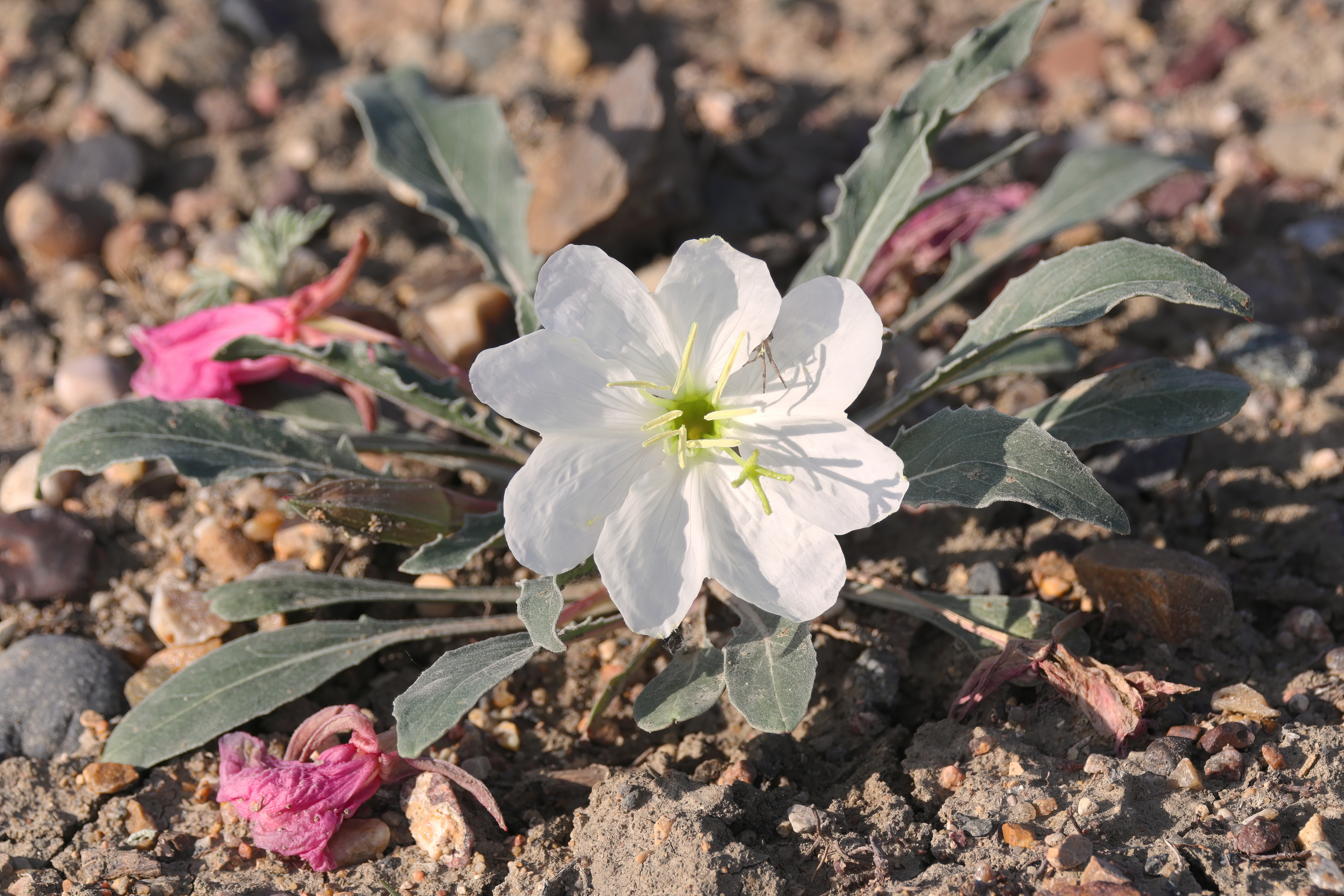
Gumbo Evening Primrose

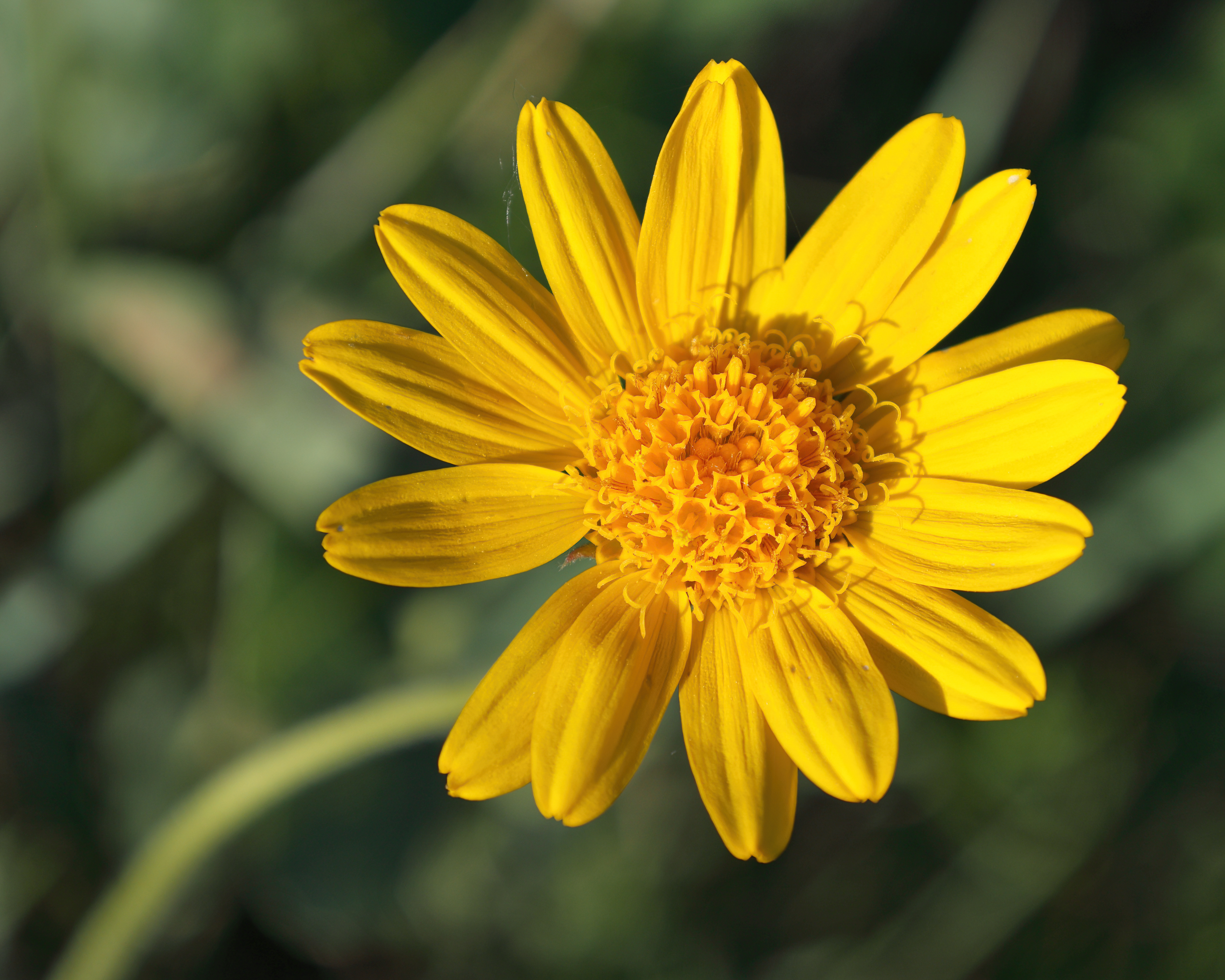
Foothill arnica

Mammals of the park

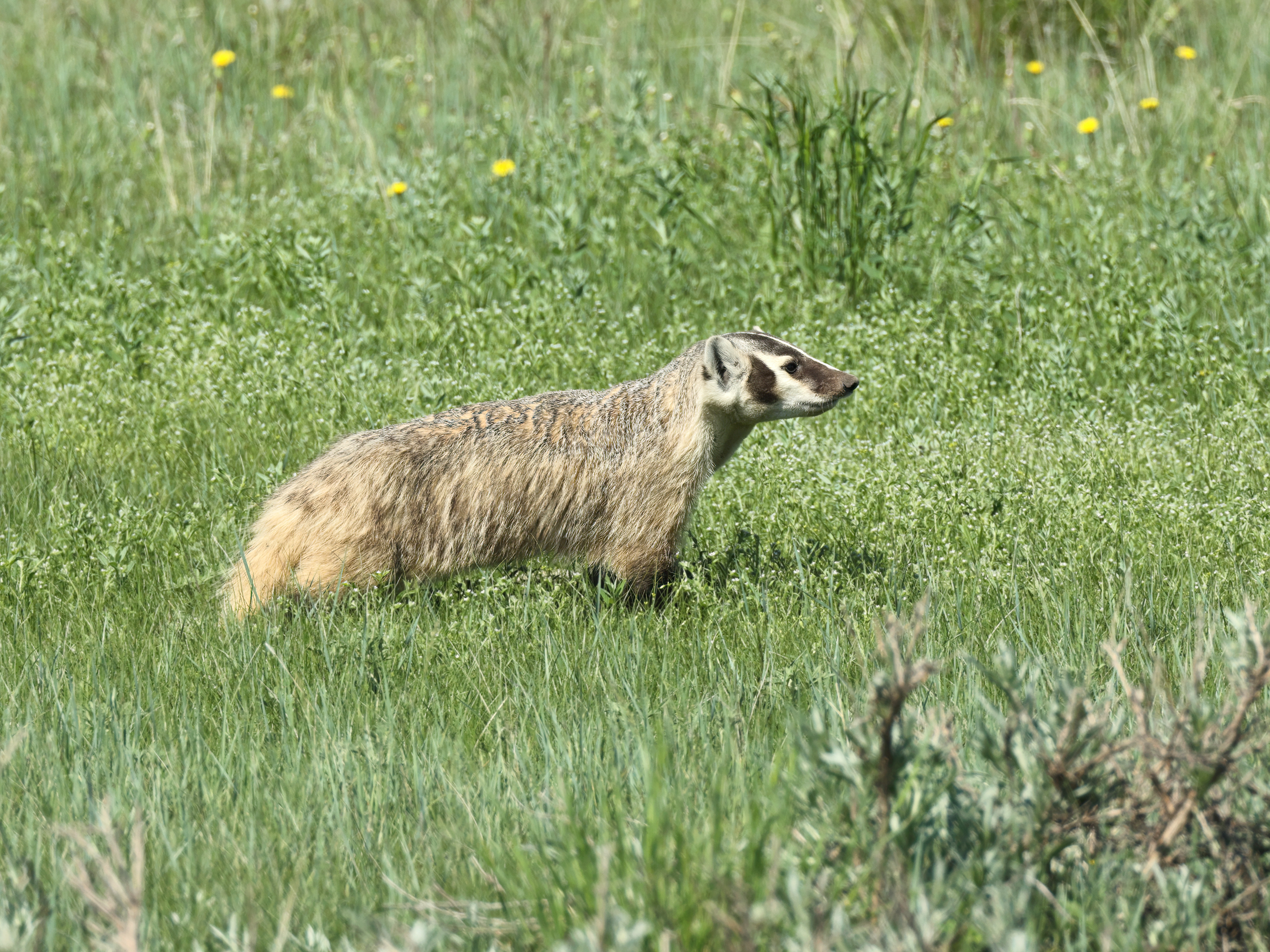
American badger

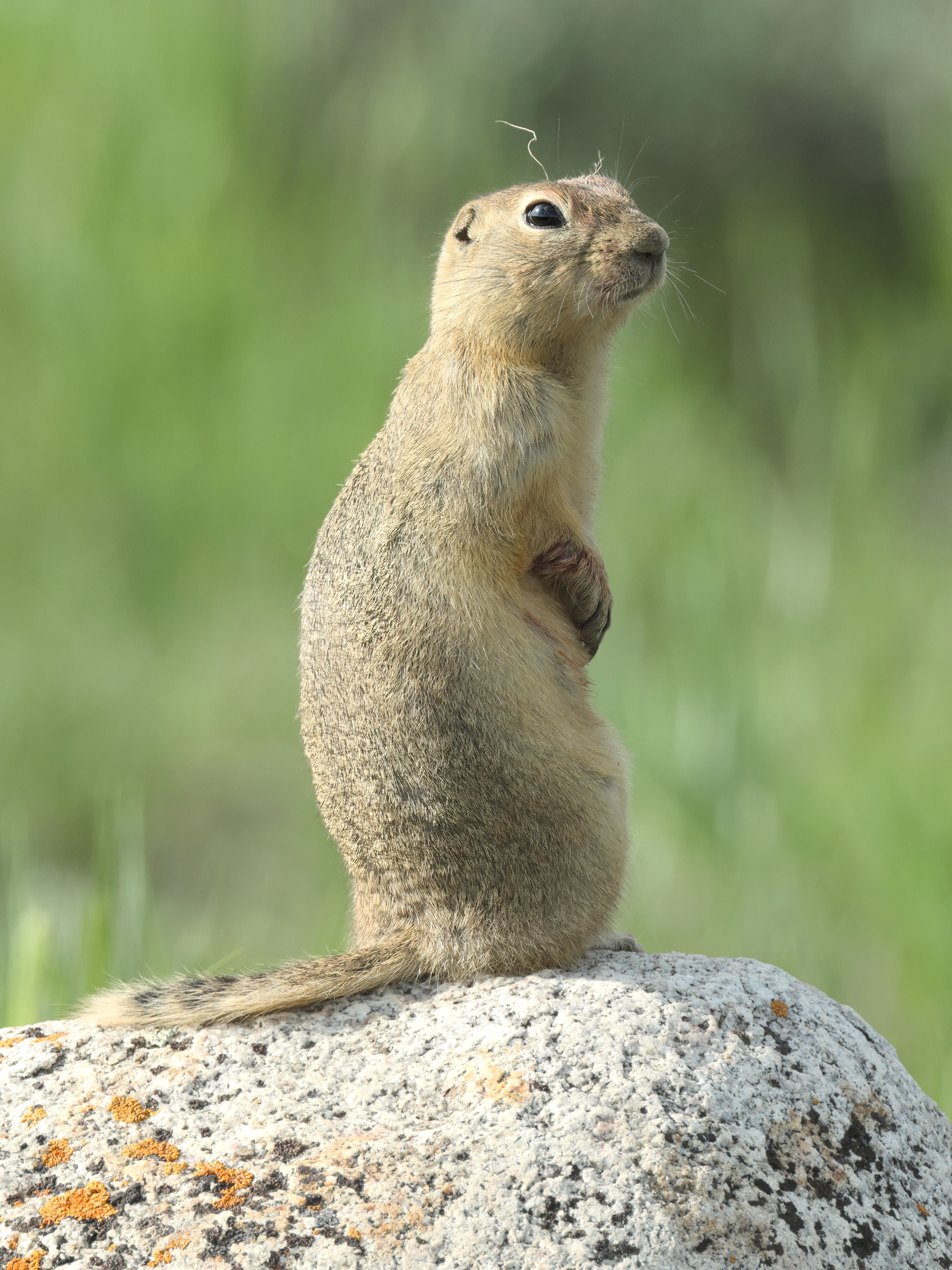
Richardson's ground squirrel

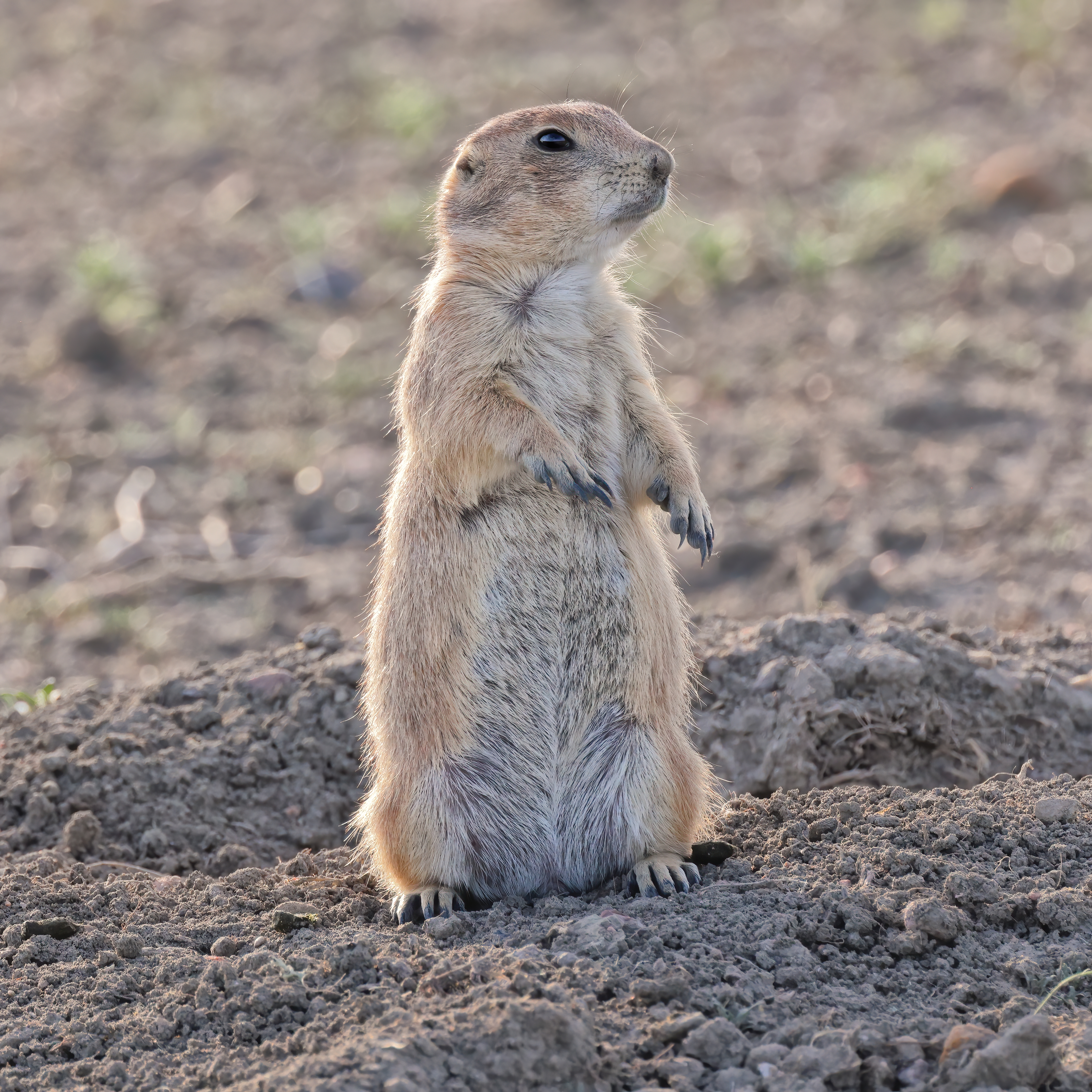
Black-tailed prairie dog

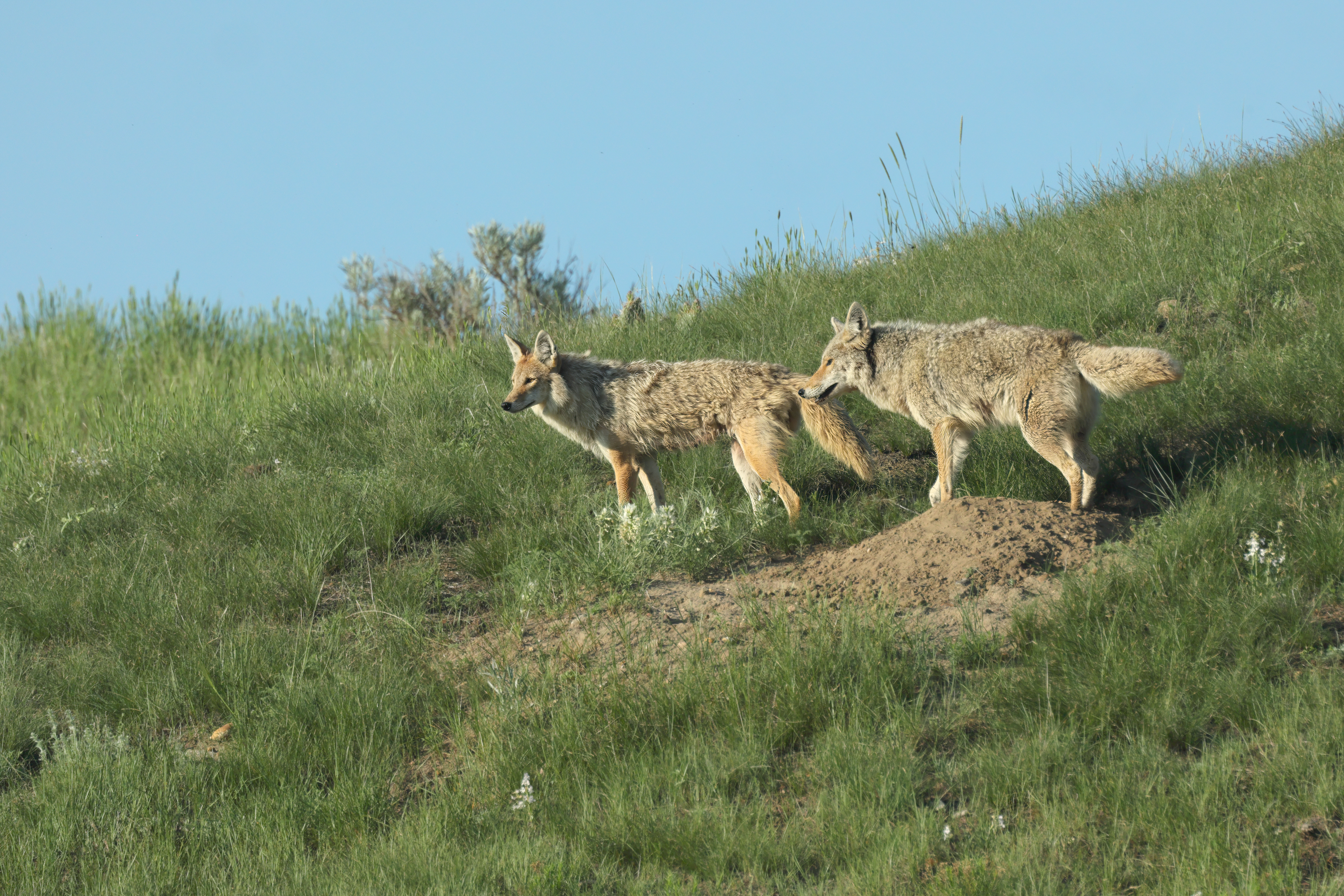
Plains coyote

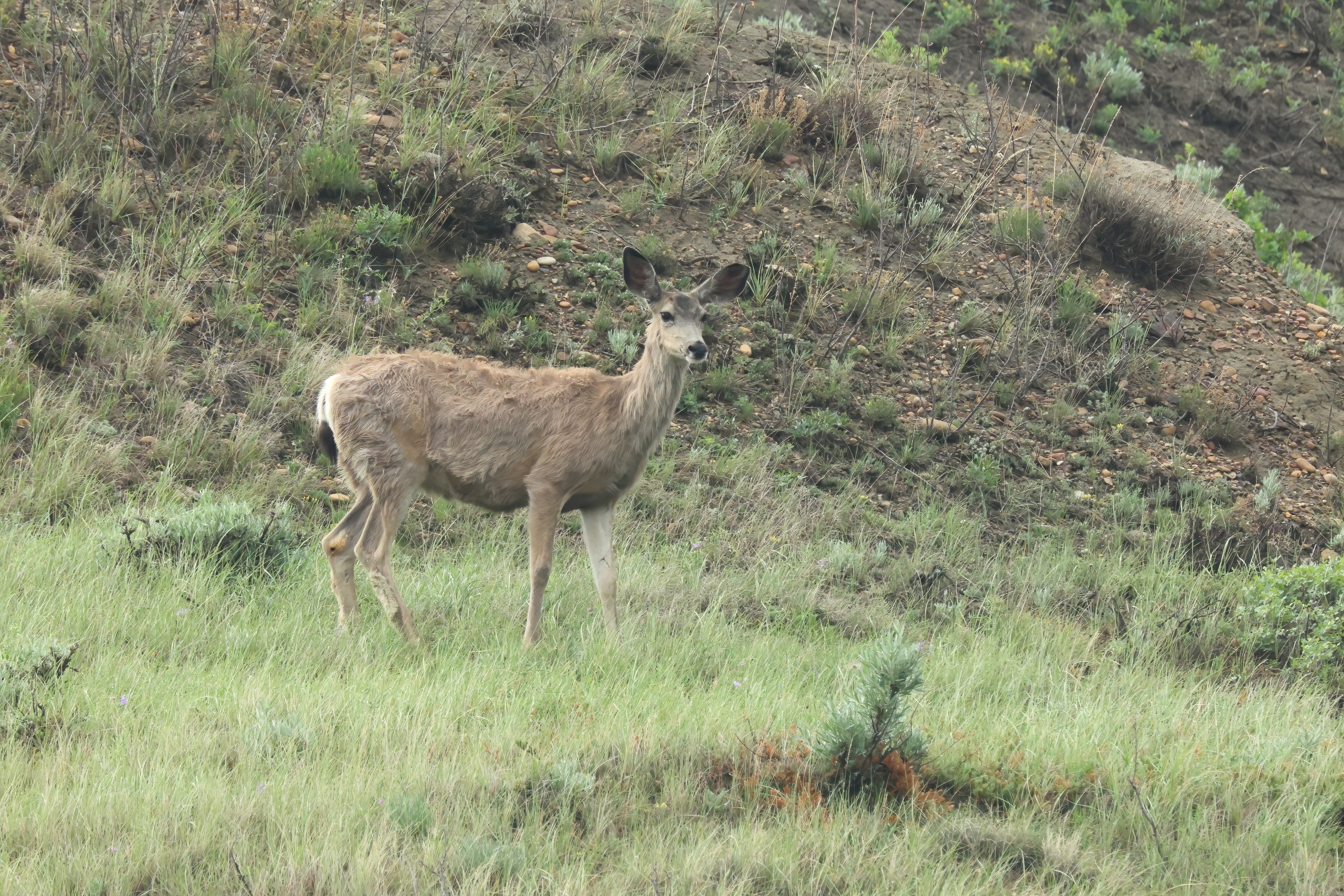
Mule deer

Birds of the park

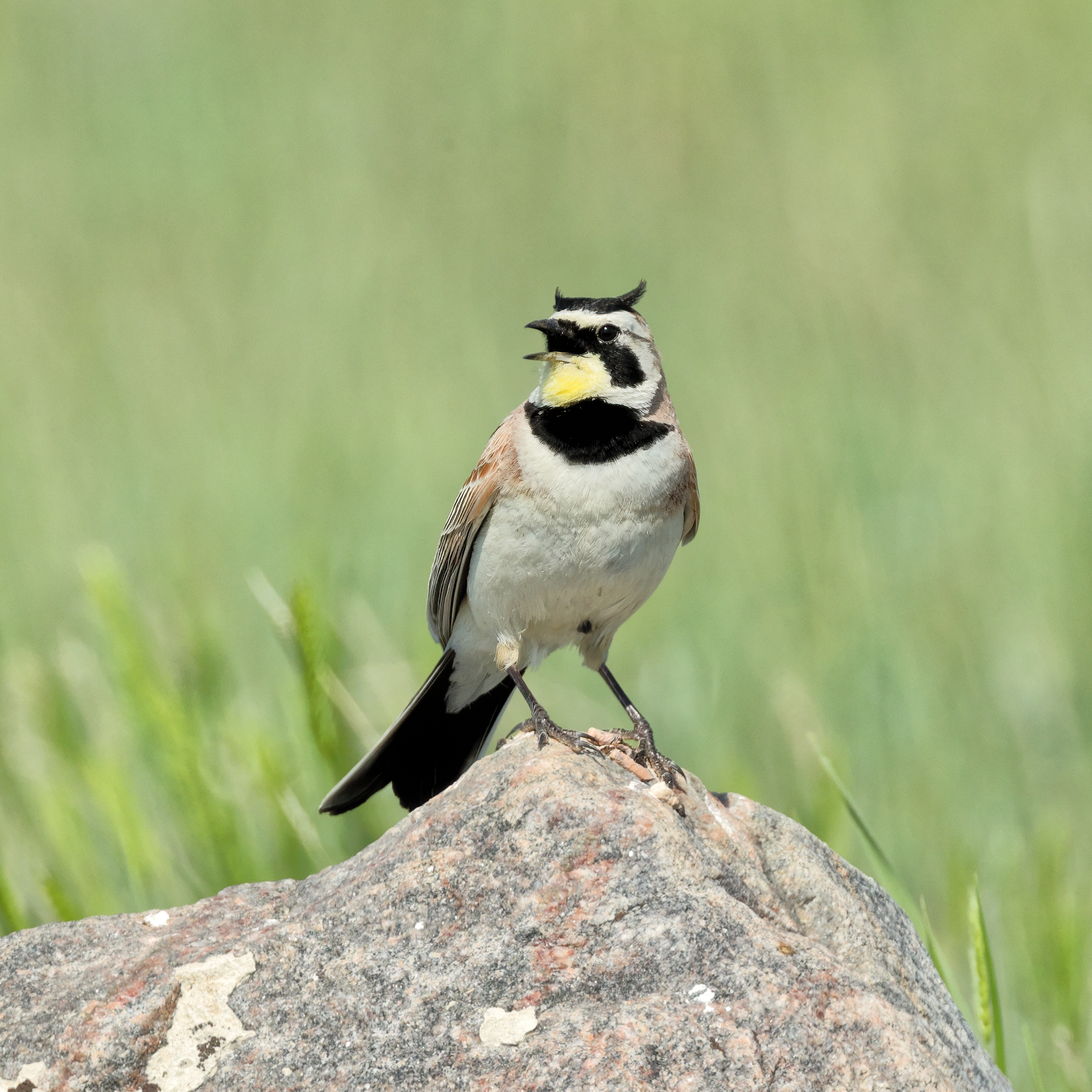
Horned lark

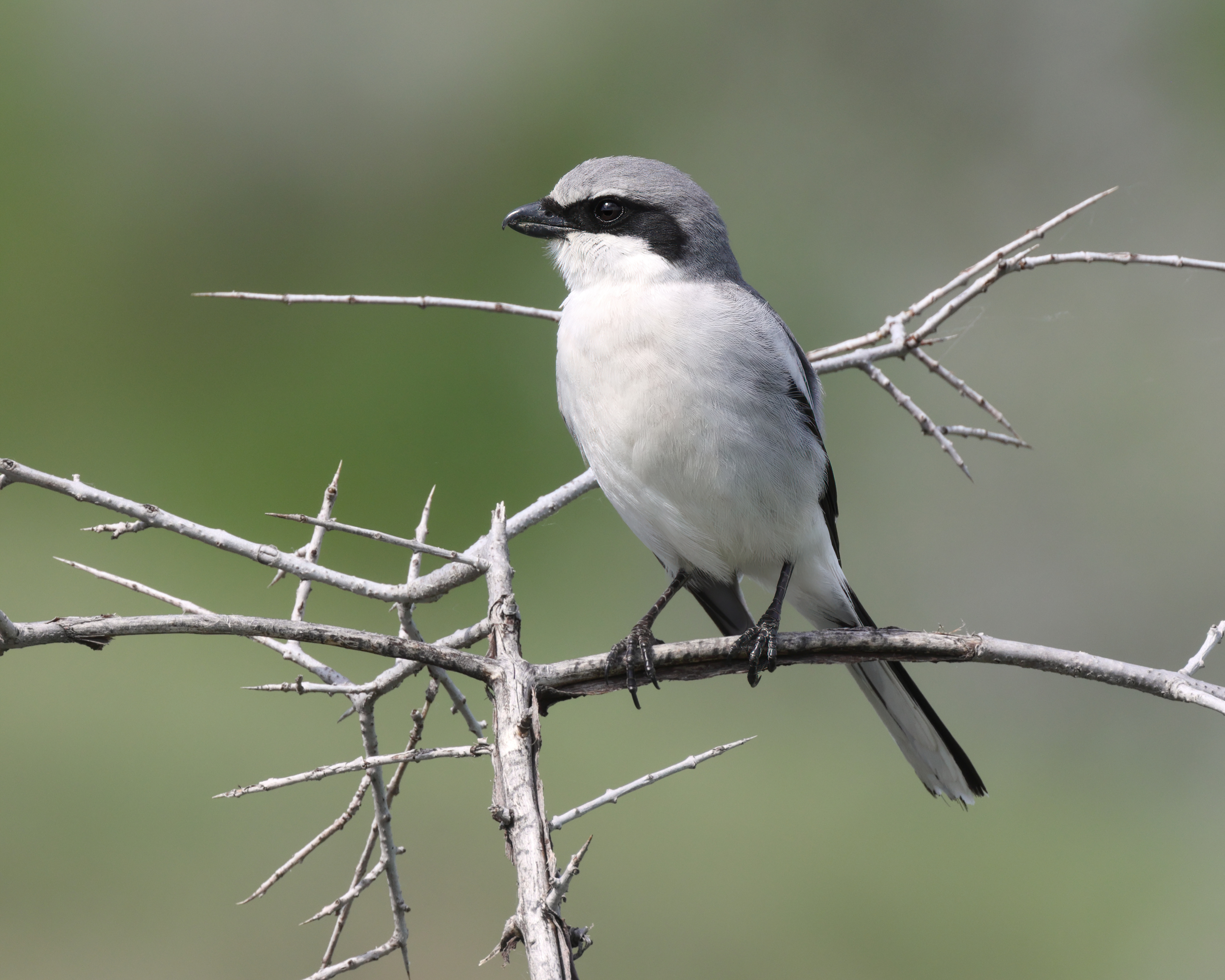
Loggerhead shrike

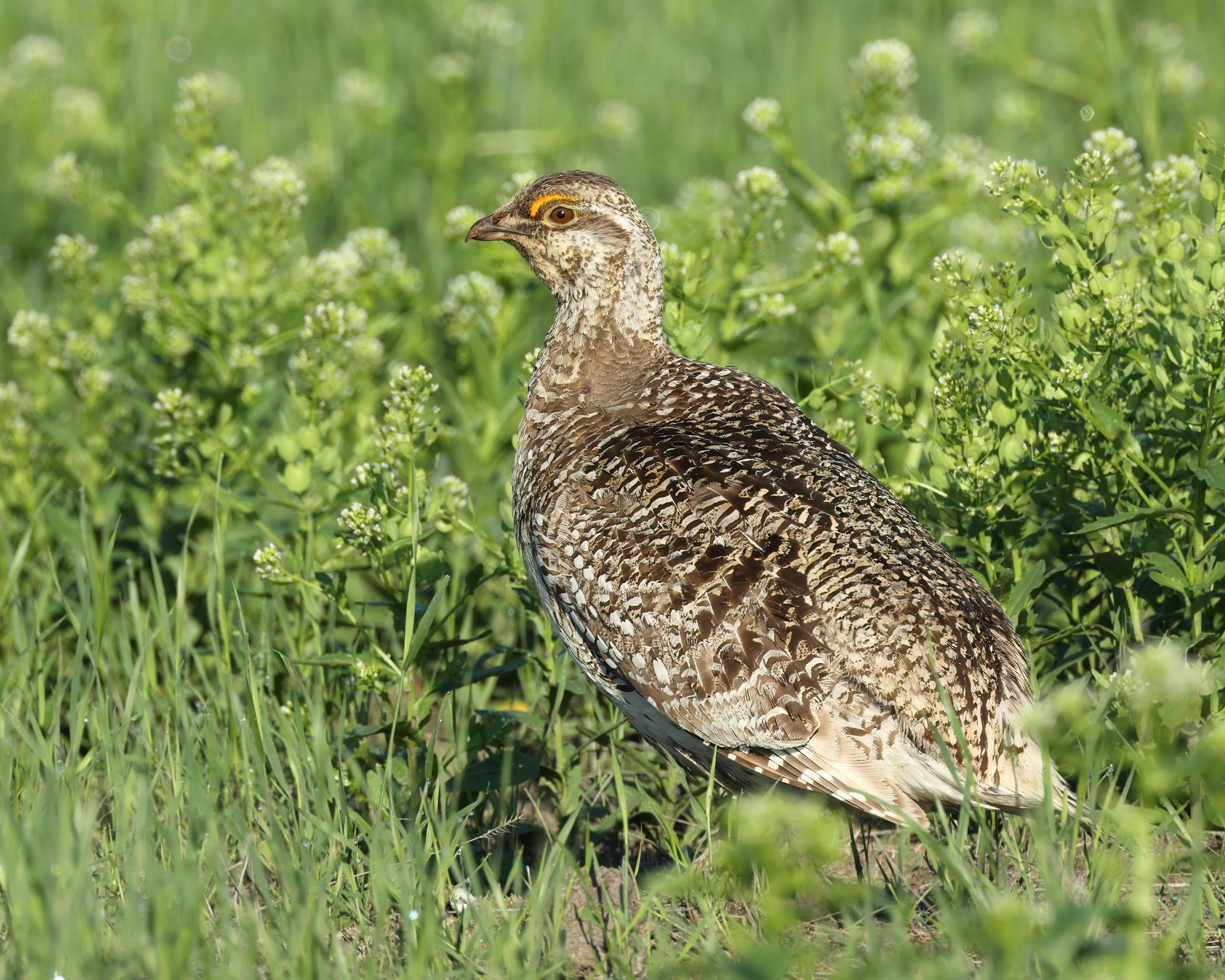
Prairie sharp-tailed grouse

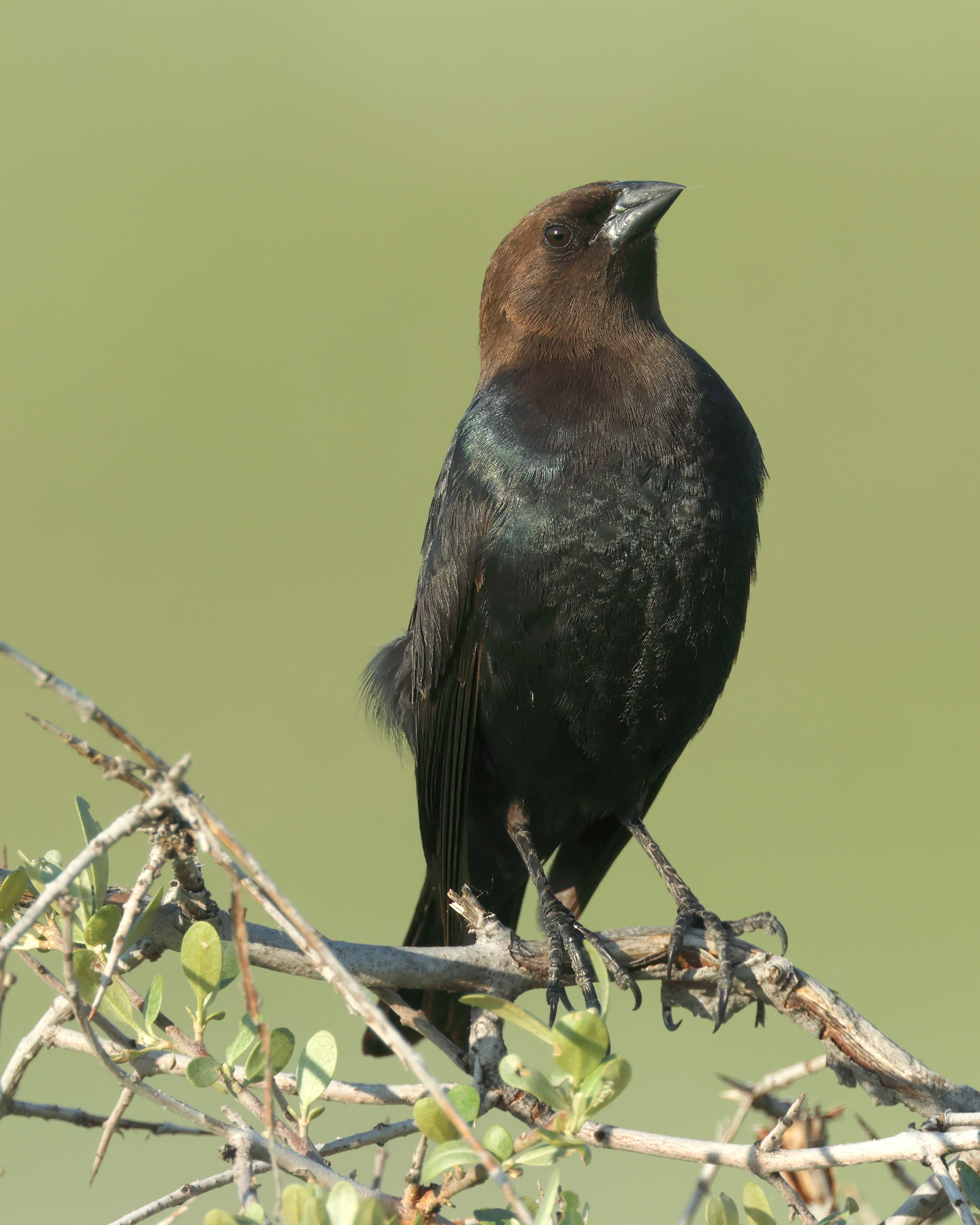
Brown-headed cowbird

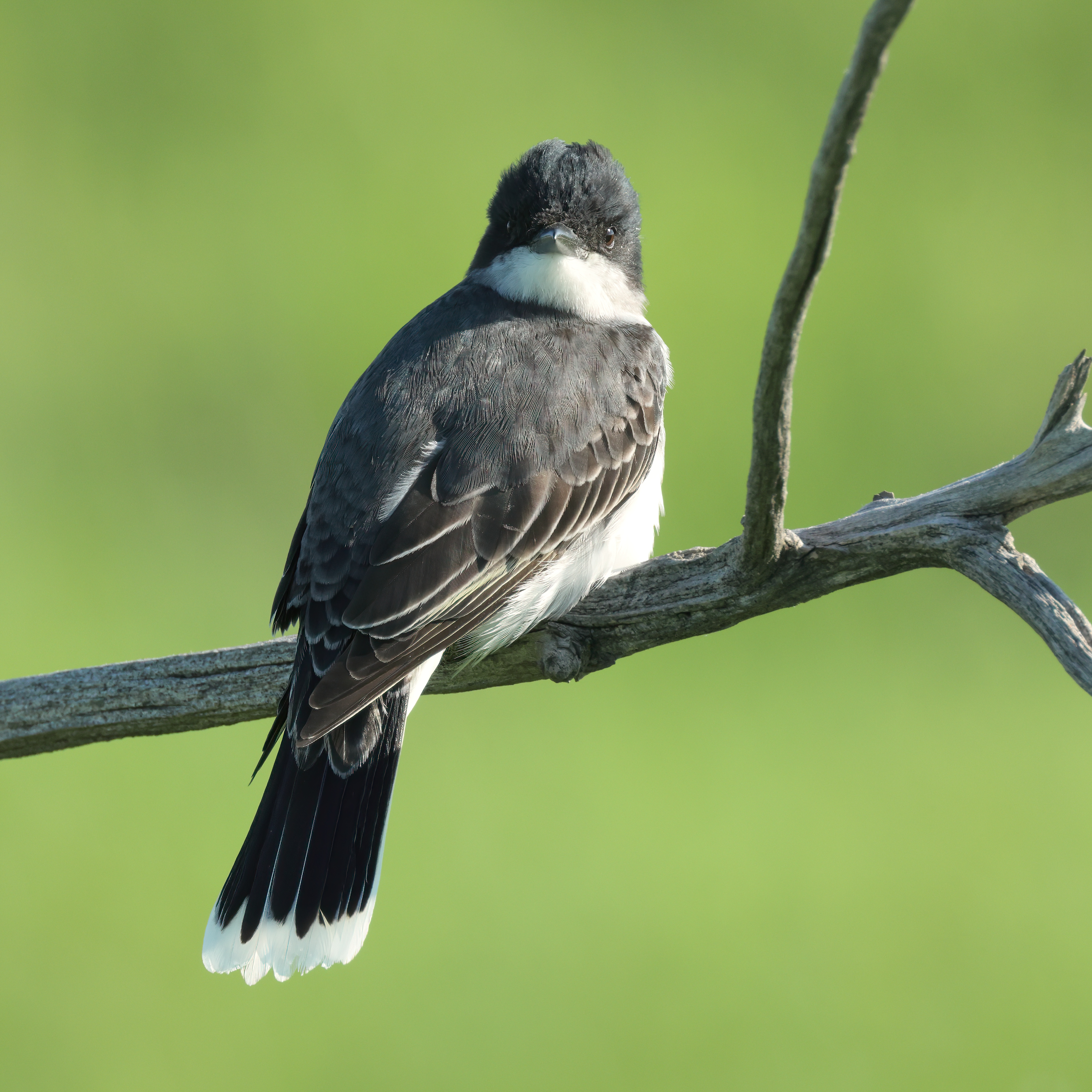
Eastern kingbird

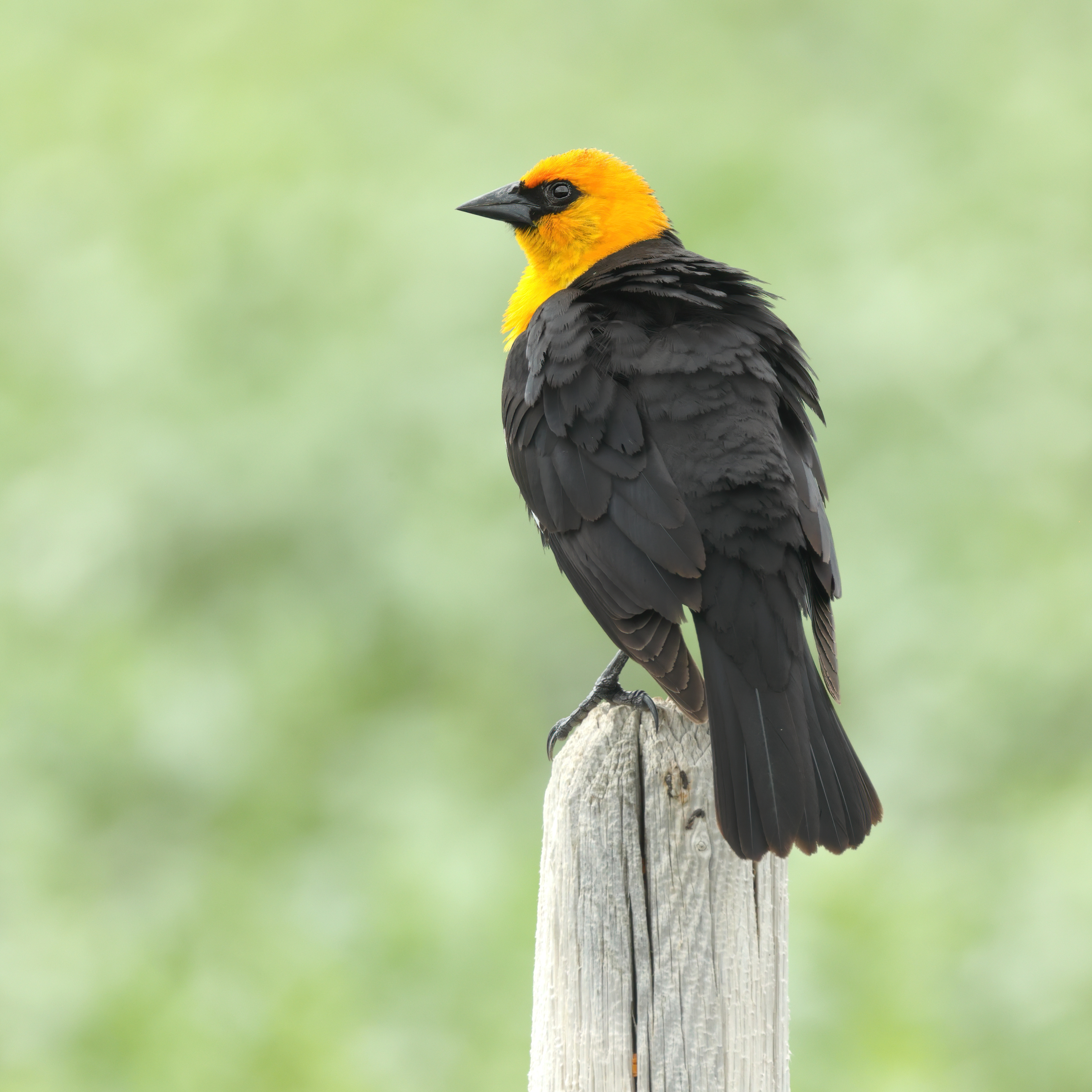
Yellow-headed blackbird

== See also ==
- List of National Parks of Canada
- List of protected areas of Saskatchewan
- List of protected grasslands of North America
- Tourism in Saskatchewan
