= Wood Mountain Hills =

Hilly plateau in Saskatchewan, Canada

- Location within Saskatchewan Location within Canada

Highest point
- Elevation: 1,013 m (3,323 ft)
- Prominence: 200 m (660 ft)
- Coordinates: 49°14′00″N 106°30′02″W

Geography
- Location: Saskatchewan, Canada
- Parent range: Missouri Coteau

Wood Mountain Hills are a hilly plateau in the Canadian province of Saskatchewan. The hills are located in the southern part of the province and are part of the Missouri Coteau, which is part of the Laurentian Divide between the watersheds of the Hudson Bay drainage basin of the Arctic Ocean and the Gulf of Mexico of the Atlantic Ocean. The hills are in a semi-arid region known as Palliser's Triangle in the Great Plains ecoregion of North America.

The Wood Mountain Hills are known locally as "the Bench" and, at a height of 1,013 metres (3,323 ft) above sea level, are the second highest point of land in Western Canada east of the Rocky Mountains. The highest point is just to the west in the neighbouring Cypress Hills.

== Geography ==
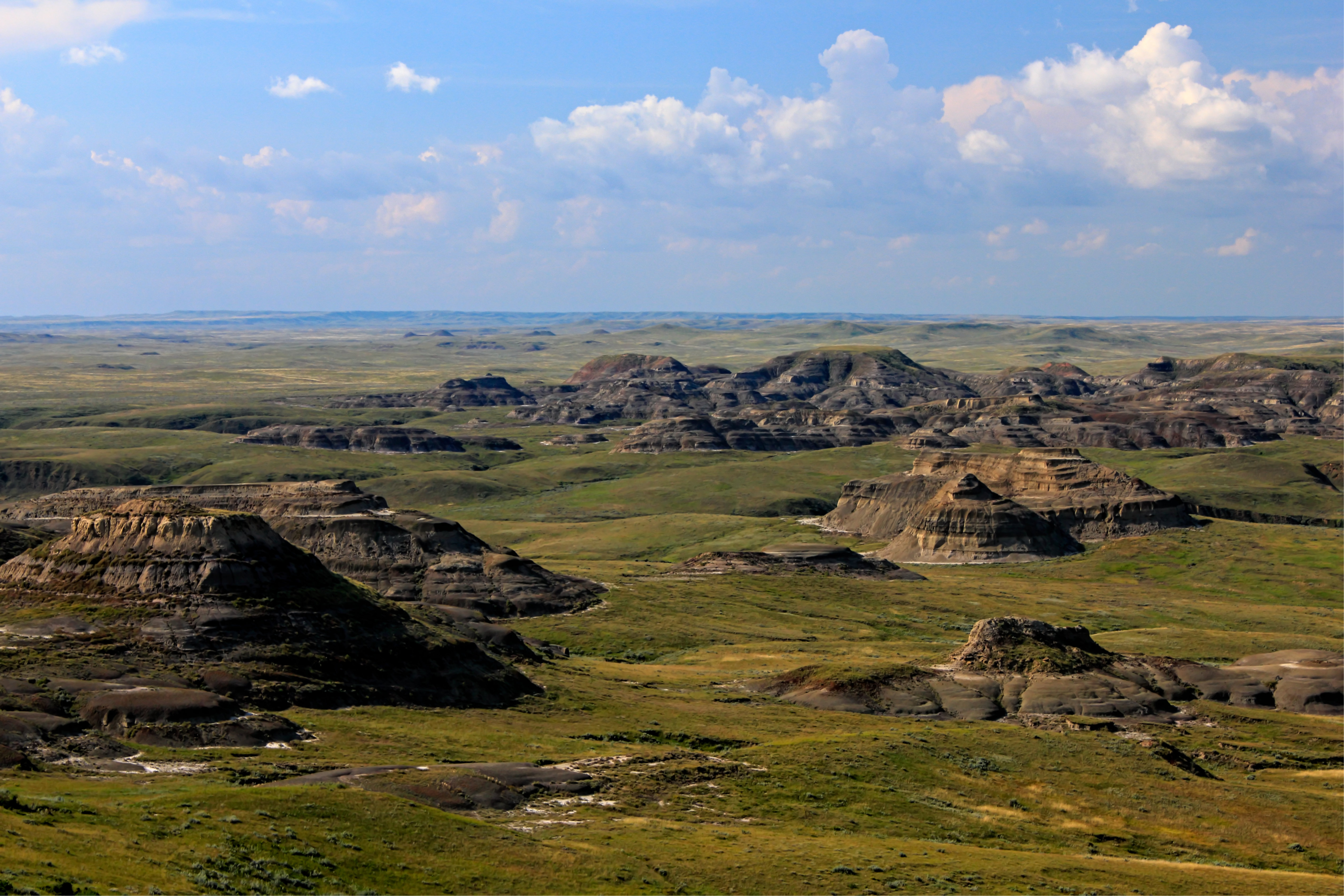
The Rock Creek Badlands on the southern slope of the plateau

The south-eastern part of the Wood Mountain Hills was one of the few places in Canada that was not covered in ice during the Last Glacial Period. This preserved tertiary sands and gravels at higher the elevations while other parts of the hills have glacial drift and deep-cut valleys and coulees carved by glacial meltwaters that are separated by flat-topped buttes. The Rock Creek Badlands, also called Killdeer Badlands, were formed by these melting glaciers. The badlands run along the southern slopes of the plateau.

The highest point of the upland at 1,013 metres (3,323 ft) above sea level is Pinto Butte, which is located at the western end and straddles the watershed divide. Most of the watershed to the north of the hills is in the Old Wives Lake endorheic drainage basin with Wood River and its tributaries being the primary water course. The southern slopes drain primarily into the Milk River drainage basin. Some of the tributaries that flow south from the hills include Frenchman River, Denniel Creek, Breed Creek, Little Breed Creek, Otter Creek, Bluff Creek, McEachern Creek, West Poplar River, Poplar River, East Poplar River, Weatherall Creek, Rock Creek, and Johnson Creek.

== Flora and fauna ==
The Wood Mountain Hills are mostly covered in grasses and are in the mixed-grass prairie ecozone of Canada. Common grasses include spear grass, wheatgrass, and blue grama grass. In areas with more moisture, such as at the bottom of coulees and alongside streams, trees and shrubs, such as aspen, green ash, wolf willow, and buffalo berry, grow. In drier locations, plants such as sage, rabbitbrush, greasewood, mosses, lichens, and cacti can be found.

Throughout the hills and in the East Block of Grasslands National Park, wildlife such as bats, black-tailed prairie dogs, swift foxes, burrowing owls, greater sage-grouse, eastern yellow-bellied racers, and greater short-horned lizards can be found.

== Parks and recreation ==
There are several Saskatchewan parks located throughout the Wood Mountain Hills.

- The East Block of Grasslands National Park is located at the south-western part of the hills and features the Rock Creek Badlands. The scenic 11-kilometre long, paved Badlands Parkway traverses the Rock Creek Badlands.
- Wood Mountain Post Provincial Park and Wood Mountain Regional Park are located along Wood Mountain Creek on the northern slopes of the plateau and are the sites of a 1874 Boundary Commission depot, North-West Mounted Police post, and the place where Sitting Bull and his followers took refuge after the Battle of the Little Bighorn in the United States.
- St. Victor Petroglyphs Provincial Park is located on the north-eastern slope south of the community of St. Victor and features over 300 petroglyphs that were estimated to have been carved between AD 500 and 1750.
- At the eastern end of the hills, on the southern shore of Fife Lake, is Rockin Beach Park.

== See also ==
- List of mountains of Saskatchewan
- Geography of Saskatchewan
- Wood Mountain Formation
- History of Saskatchewan
