= Coronach, Saskatchewan =

Town in Saskatchewan, Canada

Coronach
- Town
- Town of Coronach
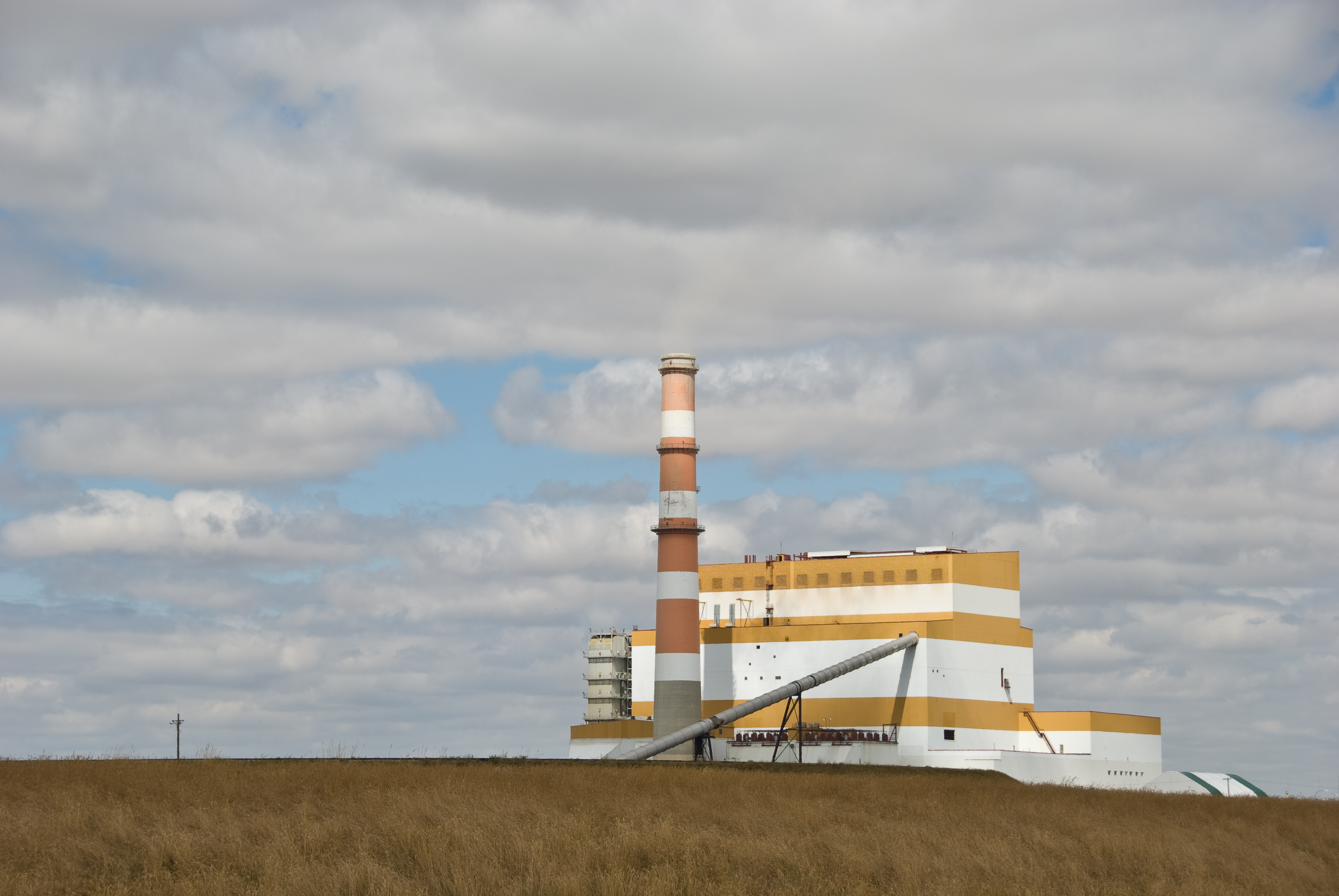
- Poplar River Power Station

- Flag

- Location within Saskatchewan Location within Hart Butte No. 11
- Coordinates: 49.1119°N 105.5195°W
- Country: Canada
- Province: Saskatchewan
- Rural municipality: Hart Butte No. 11
- Incorporated: 1928

Government
  - Mayor: Calvin Martin

Population (2016)
  - Total: 643
- Postal code: S0H 0Z0
- Highways: Highway 18 / Highway 36 / Highway 602
- Website: townofcoronach.ca

Coronach /ˈkɒrənæk/ is a town in southern Saskatchewan, Canada near the Canada–US border. It was founded in 1926 by the Canadian Pacific Railway and named after Coronach, the horse who had just won The Derby in England that year. Coronach was officially incorporated in 1928.

== History ==
After its incorporation in 1928, the town's population teetered around 300, until about 1974 when the town discovered that they were to receive the Poplar River Power Project. This project brought many new citizens to the town to build and operate the Power Plant. The Poplar River Power Plant can be seen from a distance with the large smoke stack extending above the town. With the Poplar River Power Project also came the development of the Coronach Coal Mine, which provides the coal/fuel to the Power Plant. The Coal mine has had a few locations and a variety of owners; Westmoreland Coal Company currently owns it.

== Demographics ==
In the 2021 Census of Population conducted by Statistics Canada, Coronach had a population of 612 living in 272 of its 351 total private dwellings, a change of −4.8% from its 2016 population of 643. With a land area of 2.34 km^{2} (0.90 sq mi), it had a population density of 261.5/km^{2} (677.4/sq mi) in 2021.

According to the 2016 Census, Coronach had a median age of 43.0 years.

== Climate ==
Climate data for Coronach, Saskatchewan, 1981–2010 normals, extremes 1980–present
| Month | Jan | Feb | Mar | Apr | May | Jun | Jul | Aug | Sep | Oct | Nov | Dec | Year |
|---|---|---|---|---|---|---|---|---|---|---|---|---|---|
| Record high °C (°F) | 15.0 (59.0) | 19.0 (66.2) | 24.0 (75.2) | 31.5 (88.7) | 36.0 (96.8) | 40.0 (104.0) | 42.1 (107.8) | 38.0 (100.4) | 37.3 (99.1) | 34.0 (93.2) | 24.5 (76.1) | 13.7 (56.7) | 42.1 (107.8) |
| Mean daily maximum °C (°F) | −5.5 (22.1) | −2.6 (27.3) | 3.3 (37.9) | 12.3 (54.1) | 18.4 (65.1) | 22.9 (73.2) | 26.9 (80.4) | 26.6 (79.9) | 19.9 (67.8) | 12.1 (53.8) | 2.2 (36.0) | −4.0 (24.8) | 11.0 (51.9) |
| Daily mean °C (°F) | −11.2 (11.8) | −8.2 (17.2) | −2.4 (27.7) | 5.1 (41.2) | 11.2 (52.2) | 16.0 (60.8) | 19.1 (66.4) | 18.4 (65.1) | 12.1 (53.8) | 5.2 (41.4) | −3.5 (25.7) | −9.6 (14.7) | 4.4 (39.8) |
| Mean daily minimum °C (°F) | −16.8 (1.8) | −13.6 (7.5) | −8.0 (17.6) | −2.1 (28.2) | 3.9 (39.0) | 9.2 (48.6) | 11.3 (52.3) | 10.2 (50.4) | 4.4 (39.9) | −1.9 (28.6) | −9.2 (15.4) | −15.1 (4.8) | −2.3 (27.9) |
| Record low °C (°F) | −40.0 (−40.0) | −41.0 (−41.8) | −35.3 (−31.5) | −21.6 (−6.9) | −11.9 (10.6) | −4.0 (24.8) | 2.4 (36.3) | −1.5 (29.3) | −9.7 (14.5) | −22.0 (−7.6) | −35.0 (−31.0) | −40.0 (−40.0) | −41.0 (−41.8) |
| Average precipitation mm (inches) | 13.5 (0.53) | 8.6 (0.34) | 18.3 (0.72) | 21.4 (0.84) | 51.1 (2.01) | 73.5 (2.89) | 55.6 (2.19) | 31.3 (1.23) | 18.9 (0.74) | 17.9 (0.70) | 13.3 (0.52) | 15.9 (0.63) | 339.3 (13.34) |
| Average snowfall cm (inches) | 13.2 (5.2) | 6.9 (2.7) | 12.0 (4.7) | 4.5 (1.8) | 2.5 (1.0) | 0.0 (0.0) | 0.0 (0.0) | 0.0 (0.0) | 0.6 (0.2) | 2.7 (1.1) | 11.3 (4.4) | 15.8 (6.2) | 69.5 (27.3) |
Source: Environment Canada (September record high)

== Services and attractions ==
- Big Muddy & Outlaw Cave Tours
- Camping – Poolside Park Campground, Poplar River Community Park, East Side Campground
- Coronach Sportsplex (which includes a regulation-size artificial ice rink, four artificial ice sheets for curling, and a heated outdoor swimming pool for the summer months)
- Four baseball diamonds
- Coronach Golf Club with a 9-hole, 3,000 yard grass greens course
- Coronach Museum – was established in 1987 to tell the story of the founding, settlement and development of the Coronach district from the year 1900. There is a hospital room, a schoolroom, communication room, shop, parlour, library, town office, bedroom, store, kitchen, toy room, church, sewing and textiles, and bathroom to display artifacts that shaped the history
- The Rustic Tavern is a restaurant in Coronach

== Transportation ==
The Town of Coronach is a part owner of the Fife Lake Railway.

The Scobey–Coronach Border Crossing and the Coronach/Scobey Border Station Airport are about 15 kilometres (9.3 mi) south-east of town.

== See also ==
- List of towns in Saskatchewan
- List of communities in Saskatchewan
