= Notukeu Creek =

River in Saskatchewan, Canada

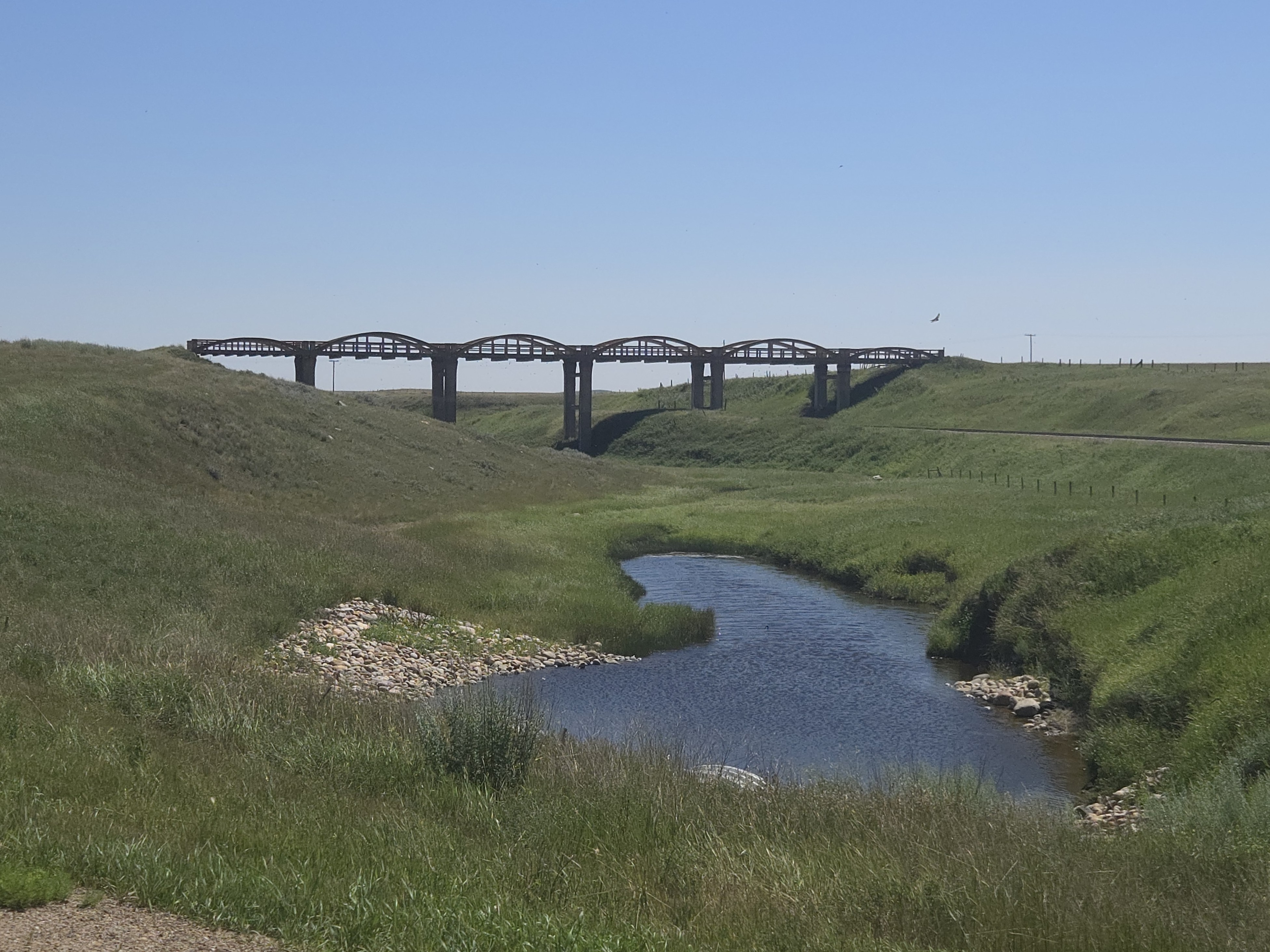
- Six-arch bowstring bridge over Notukeu Creek

- Location of the river's mouth in Saskatchewan Notukeu Creek (Canada)

Location
- Country: Canada
- Province: Saskatchewan

Physical characteristics
- Source: Notukeu Lake
  - location: RM of Bone Creek No. 108
  - coordinates: 49.7432°N 108.2609°W
- Mouth: Wood River
  - location: RM of Gravelbourg No. 104
  - coordinates: 49.9327°N 106.477°W

Basin features
- River system: Old Wives Lake
- Tributaries
  - left: Russell Creek
  - right: Grassy Creek; Bull Creek
- Waterbodies: Admiral Reservoir; Gouverneur Reservoir
- Bridges: Coppen Bridge

Notukeu Creek is a river in the Canadian province of Saskatchewan. Notukeu means "battle" in the local Indigenous language. The river begins at Notukeu Lake north-east of Shaunavon and flows along the northern slopes of the Wood Mountain Hills east to the Wood River north-east of Gravelbourg. From source to mouth, the river drops about 200 metres (660 ft) in elevation. Highway 13 and a shortline railway follow it for much of its length. Several communities, rural municipalities, bridges, two reservoirs, and a regional park are also along its course.

Notukeu Creek, being a tributary of the Wood River, is within a closed watershed. The Wood River flows north into Old Wives Lake, which has no outflow.

== River's course ==
Notukeu Creek begins at an elevation of almost 900 metres (3,000 ft) above sea level in the Rural Municipality of Bone Creek No. 108 at Notukeu Lake about 14 kilometres (8.7 mi) north-east of the town of Shaunavon. It flows out of the south-east corner of the lake where it is met by Grassy Creek. From that confluence, the river heads east where it is followed closely by the Great Western Railway (formerly a Canadian Pacific Railway line) and Highway 13. About 6 kilometres (3.7 mi) from its source, the river crosses Highway 13 and then approaches an abandoned six-arch bowstring bridge (49.7262°N 108.1799°W) that was built in 1936. The bridge is about 90 metres (300 ft) long, crosses over Notukeu Creek and the railway, and is part of the original routing of Highway 13.

Continuing east from the bridge, Notukeu Creek runs along the western side of Scotsguard then heads south-east where it flows into Admiral Reservoir (built in 1948). From the east end of the lake, it heads north-east to Crichton where it flows north around the village crossing Highway 13 twice. From Crichton, it continues east where it crosses Highway 4 south of Cadillac. Bull Creek meets Notukeu Creek south-east of Cadillac. A short distance east of that confluence, Notukeu Creek turns north where it once again crosses Highway 13 and then empties into Gouverneur Reservoir (built in 1951). At the northern end of the reservoir, the river exits at the dam and travels east to Ponteix. At Ponteix, it crosses Highway 628, runs along the north side of town, and passes through Notukeu Regional Park.

From Ponteix, Notukeu Creek meanders generally north-east towards Vanguard. South of Vanguard, it is met by Russell Creek, crosses Highway 609, and then heads east across Highways 43 and 19. In the RM of Gravelbourg No. 104 about 8 kilometres (5.0 mi) east-southeast of Bateman and 3 kilometres (1.9 mi) north of Coppen, the historic Coppen Bridge (49.9791°N 106.6420°W) crosses the river. The bridge, designed for vehicle traffic and built in 1920 by the Dominion Bridge Company, is a single span Pratt through truss bridge that is 31.7 metres (104 ft) long and 4.88 metres (16.0 ft) wide. Continuing east from the bridge, Notukeu Creek crosses Highways 610 and 58 before meeting the Wood River about 8 kilometres (5.0 mi) north-east of Gravelbourg.

Notukeu Creek passes through the rural municipalities of Bone Creek No. 108, Grassy Creek No. 78, Wise Creek No. 77, Auvergne No. 76, Whiska Creek No. 106, Glen Bain No. 105, and Gravelbourg No. 104.

== See also ==
- List of rivers of Saskatchewan
