= Gouverneur Reservoir =

Reservoir in Saskatchewan, Canada

- Location in Saskatchewan Gouverneur Reservoir (Canada)
- Location: RM of Wise Creek No. 77, Saskatchewan
- Coordinates: 49.7473°N 107.6613°W
- Part of: Wood River drainage basin
- Primary inflows: Notukeu Creek
- River sources: Wood Mountain Hills
- Primary outflows: Notukeu Creek
- Basin countries: Canada
- Managing agency: Saskatchewan Water Security Agency
- Built: 1951
- First flooded: 1951
- Max. length: 2.9 km (1.8 mi)
- Surface area: 171 ha (420 acres)
- Max. depth: 6.4 m (21 ft)
- Shore length^{1}: 13 km (8.1 mi)
- Surface elevation: 771 m (2,530 ft)
- ^{1} Shore length is not a well-defined measure.

Gouverneur Reservoir is a reservoir in the Canadian province of Saskatchewan. It is about 6 kilometres (3.7 mi) north-west of Cadillac along the course of Notukeu Creek in the Rural Municipality of Wise Creek No. 77. Notukeu Creek is a tributary of the Wood River in the Old Wives Lake watershed. The reservoir is impounded by Gouverneur Dam, which was built in 1951.

The community of Gouverneur — named after Gouverneur Ogden, a former vice president of the Canadian Pacific Railway (CPR) — is near the eastern shore and a boat launch is on the western one.

== Fish species ==
Fish commonly found in Gouverneur Reservoir include yellow perch, walleye, brown trout, and white sucker. It is stocked with walleye and brown trout.

== See also ==
- List of lakes of Saskatchewan
- Dams and reservoirs in Saskatchewan
