= Chaplin Lake =

Lake in Saskatchewan, Canada

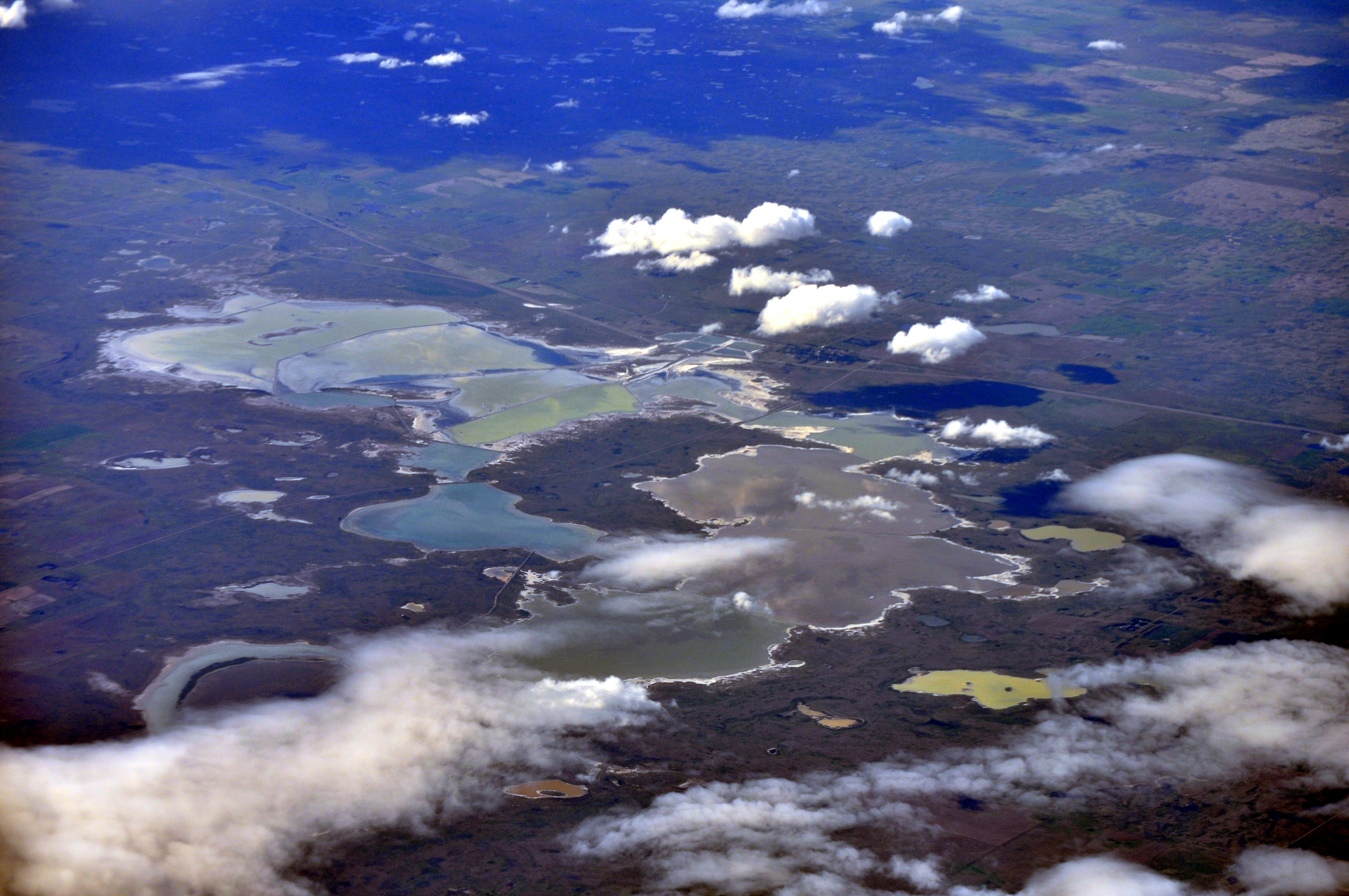
- Chaplin Lake

- Location within Saskatchewan Location within Canada
- Location: RM of Chaplin No. 164, Saskatchewan
- Coordinates: 50.4016°N 106.6004°W
- Type: Salt lake
- Part of: Wood River drainage basin
- Primary outflows: Chaplin Creek
- Basin countries: Canada
- Max. length: 35 km (22 mi)
- Max. width: 10 km (6.2 mi)
- Surface area: 17,141 ha (42,360 acres)
- Surface elevation: 660 m (2,170 ft)
- Settlements: Chaplin

Chaplin Lake is a salt lake in the south-west corner of the Canadian province of Saskatchewan. The lake is in the Prairie Pothole Region of North America, which extends throughout three Canadian provinces and five U.S. states, and within Palliser's Triangle and the Great Plains ecoregion of Canada. Along the northern shore is the village of Chaplin, Chaplin Nature Centre, and a sodium sulphate mine owned and operated by Saskatchewan Mining and Minerals. The lake is divided into four sections by dykes built by the mining company. The Trans-Canada Highway runs along the northern shore and Highway 58 runs through the middle of the lake in a north–south direction.

Chaplin Lake and neighbouring Reed and Old Wives Lakes are situated in a physiographic region called the Chaplin Plain Landscape Area. These salt lakes make up the second largest saline lake in Canada, after the Quill Lakes, and the fourth largest in North America. It is a very important region for migratory and nesting birds and it was designated as Western Canada's first hemispheric shorebird reserve when it joined the Western Hemisphere Shorebird Reserve Network (WHSRN). At the southern end of the lake, an arroyo creek called Chaplin Creek flows out of the lake and into Wood River, which leads to Old Wives Lake.

== Saskatchewan Mining and Minerals ==
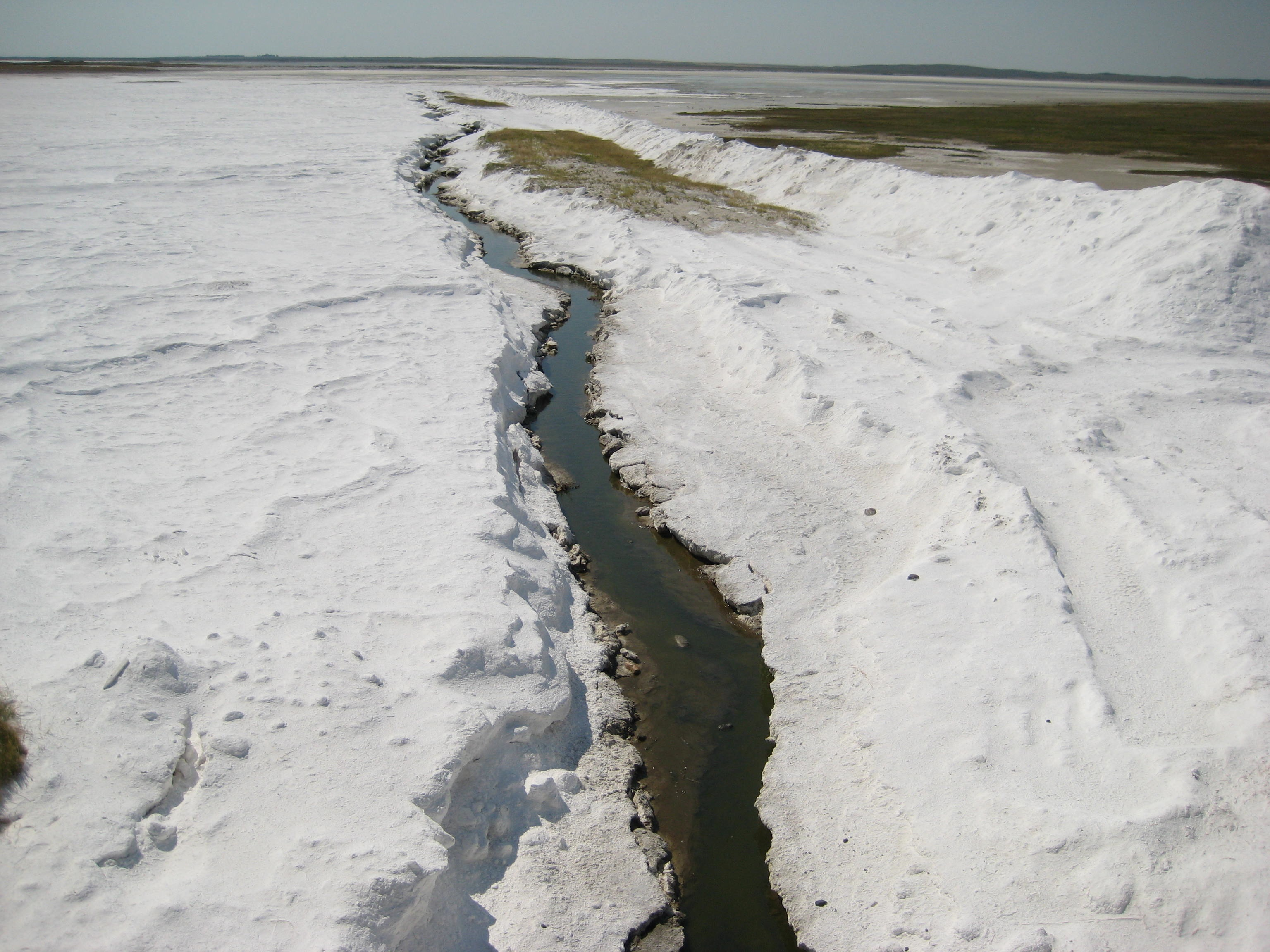
Chaplin Lake salt

Saskatchewan Mining and Minerals operates a sodium sulphate mine on the northern shore of the lake, next to the village of Chaplin. Construction of the salt mine began in 1947 and it officially opened under the name of Saskatchewan Minerals as a Crown corporation in 1948 with its first shipment of salt cake to Bathhurst Pulp & Paper in New Brunswick. The sodium sulphate that's mined there is used in a variety of products such as detergents, pulp and paper, textiles, and mineral feed for livestock.

In the early 1980s, researchers concerned about declining migratory bird numbers across North America noticed that there was a very large number of birds that stopped over at Chaplin Lake in the spring. Saskatchewan Minerals was approached by the researchers about the preservation of habitat at Chaplin Lake and an agreement was made to help preserve the environment for migrating birds. The mine helps regulate water levels so that during drought years the lake doesn't completely dry up and during wet years, flooding is controlled. In 1988, Saskatchewan Minerals ceased being a Crown corporation and was privatised. In 2013, it was renamed Saskatchewan Mining and Minerals Inc. "to better reflect our long-term vision."

== WHSRN & IBA ==
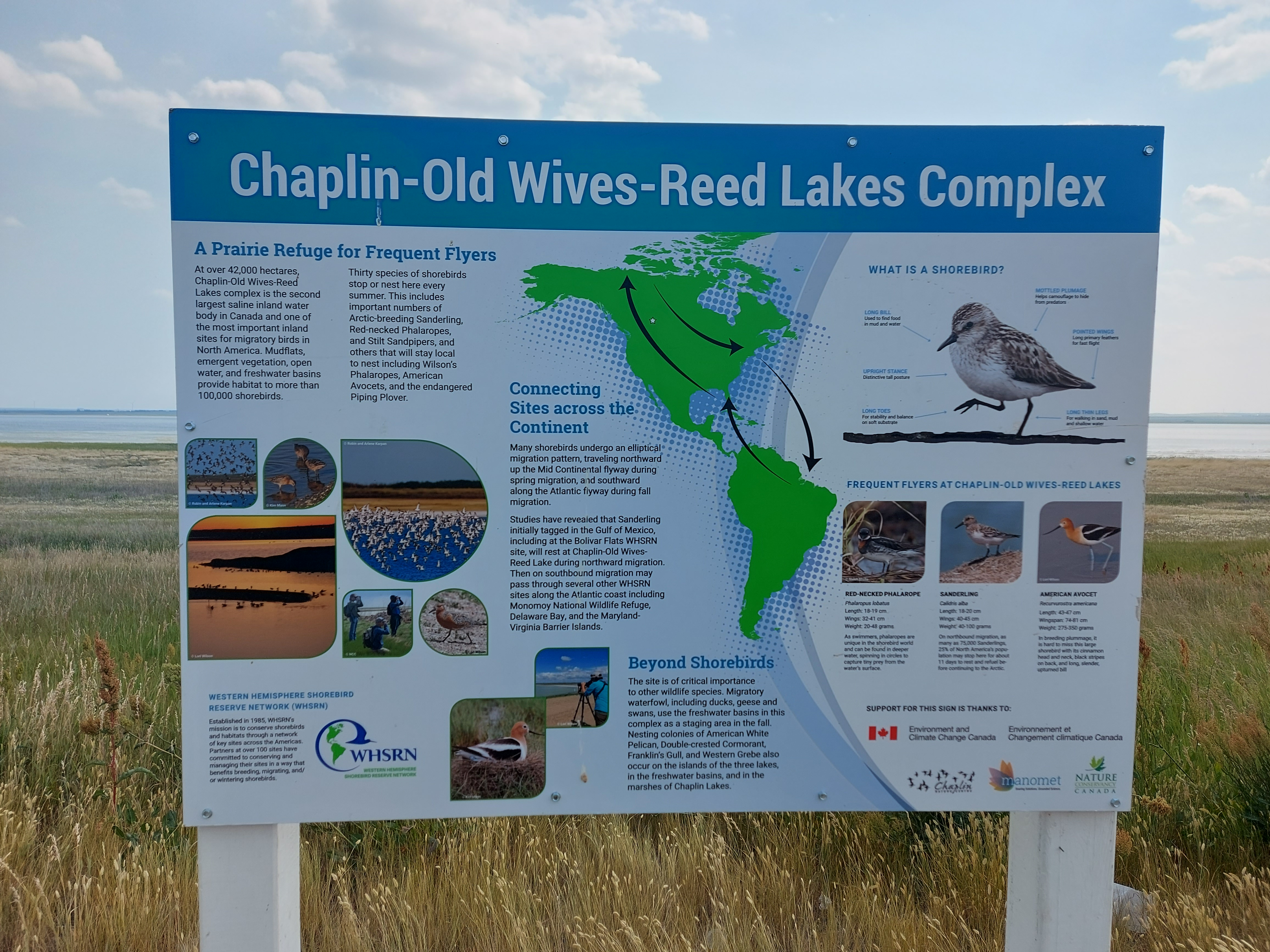
Chaplin - Old Wives - Reed Lakes WHSRN

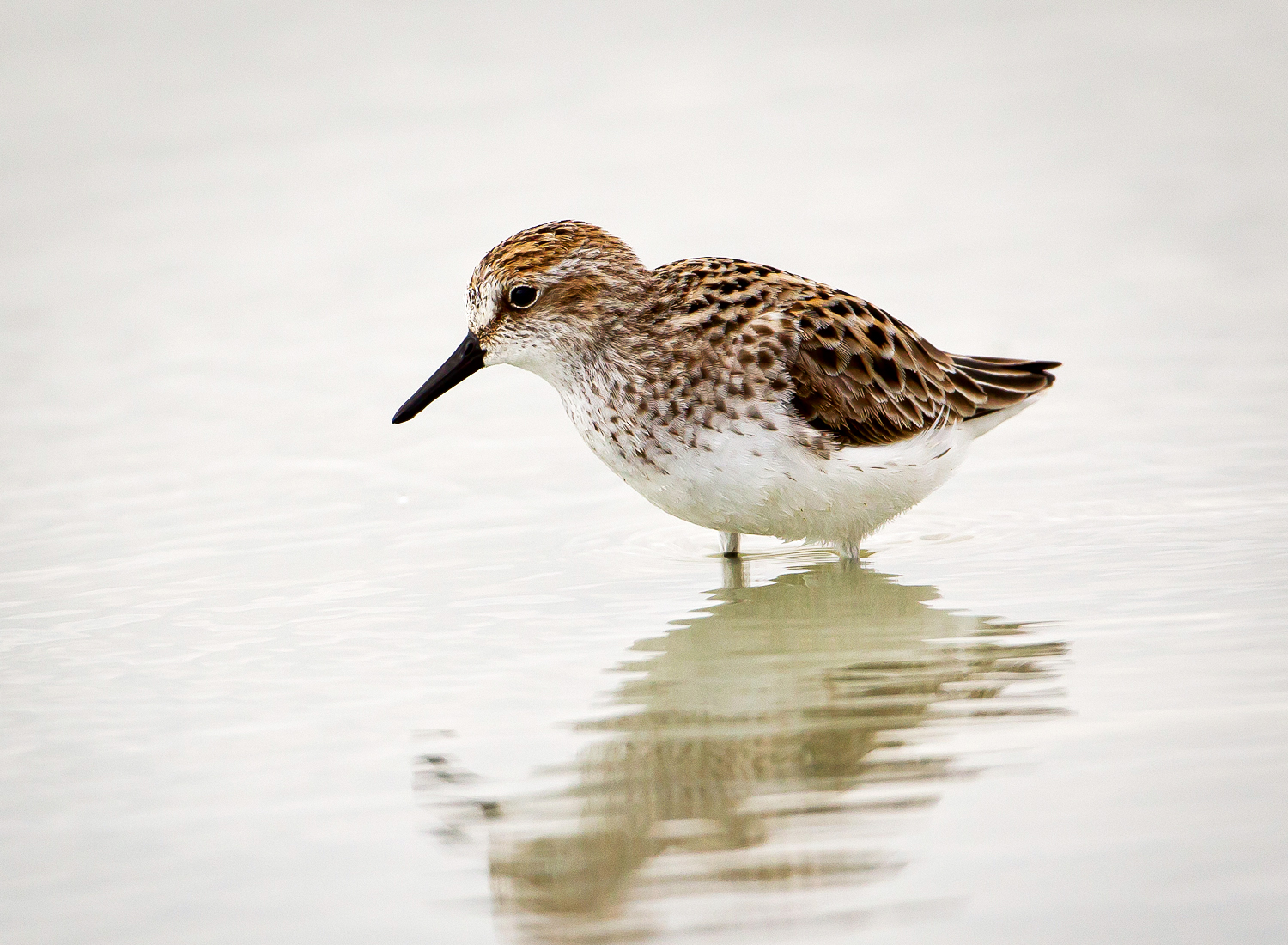
Semipalmated Sandpiper at Chaplin Lake

Chaplin Lake and its surrounding shore are part of the Chaplin Lake (SK 033) Important Bird Area (IBA) of Canada. The Chaplin Lake IBA covers an area 171.41 km^{2} (66.18 sq mi) encompassing the lake and its shoreline. Up to about 30 different species of shore birds, totalling about 100,000 individuals, visit the lake and the IBA site each year. One of the primary foods for the migratory birds is brine shrimp. In April 1997, Chaplin and its two neighbouring lakes, Reed and Old Wives, were designated part of the Western Hemisphere Shorebird Reserve Network (WHSRN). It is one of only three such sites in Canada and the only one that is located inland. The other two sites are the Fraser River estuary and Bay of Fundy. The Chaplin / Old Wives / Reed Lakes WHSRN is 42,680 ha (105,500 acres) and is managed by Saskatchewan Mining and Minerals, Ducks Unlimited Canada, and the Chaplin Nature Centre. Tours are available through the nature centre.

In all, about 180 different bird species either visit the lake or make it a year-round home. Some of the species include the American avocet, black-necked stilt, Hudsonian godwit, American golden-plover, Wilson's snipe, piping plover, and the semipalmated sandpiper.

== Mackie Ranch NCC ==
In November 2021, the Nature Conservancy of Canada (NCC) purchased the Mackie Ranch on the eastern shore of Chaplin Lake, which contains 646 ha (1,600 acres) of native grassland. In the 25 years prior to this land purchase, Saskatchewan had lost 809,000 ha (2,000,000 acres) with only about 25% of the original grasslands left intact in the province. Grasslands are an important part of the ecosystem because they filter water, help prevent flooding and droughts, provide habitat and breeding grounds for birds, and sequester carbon.

This plot of land is important because of the habitat it provides to birds and other wildlife. Over half of the world’s population of sanderlings stop to rest and feed at the lake during their spring migration. Various sandpipers, such as semipalmated sandpipers, Baird's sandpipers, and red knots, as well as piping plovers also stop-over at the lake during migration. The land provides habitat for other birds such as Saskatchewan's provincial bird, the sharp-tailed grouse, the chestnut-collared longspur, the ferruginous hawk, and the long-billed curlew. The Mackie Ranch also has at least two active mating leks. To help keep the grassland healthy and sustainable, cattle continue to graze the land.

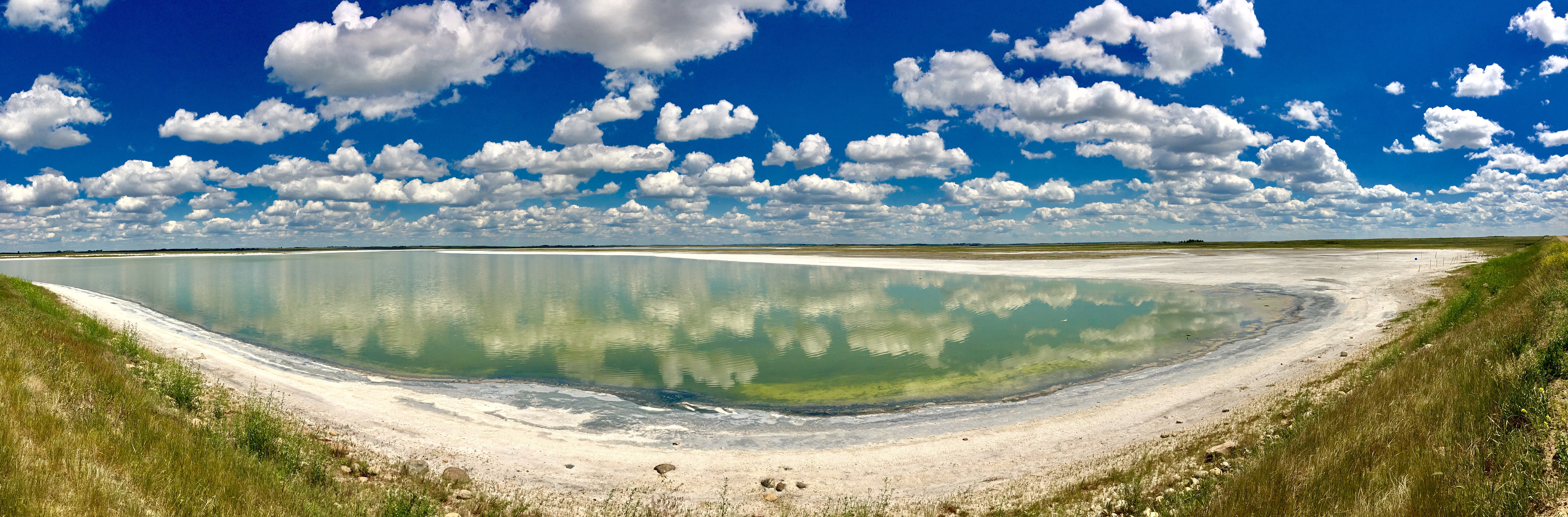
Shore of Chaplin Lake

== See also ==
- List of lakes of Saskatchewan
- List of protected areas of Saskatchewan
- List of mines in Saskatchewan
- Tourism in Saskatchewan
