= Admiral Reservoir =

Reservoir in Saskatchewan, Canada

- Location in Saskatchewan Admiral Reservoir (Canada)
- Location: RM of Grassy Creek No. 78, Saskatchewan
- Coordinates: 49.6858°N 108.0498°W
- Part of: Old Wives Lake drainage basin
- Primary inflows: Notukeu Creek
- River sources: Wood Mountain Hills
- Primary outflows: Notukeu Creek
- Basin countries: Canada
- Managing agency: Saskatchewan Water Security Agency
- Built: 1948
- First flooded: 1948
- Max. length: 1.3 km (0.81 mi)
- Surface area: 40.9 ha (101 acres)
- Max. depth: 5.2 m (17 ft)
- Shore length^{1}: 4.7 km (2.9 mi)
- Settlements: None
- ^{1} Shore length is not a well-defined measure.

Admiral Reservoir is a small reservoir in the Canadian province of Saskatchewan. It is about 4.3 kilometres (2.7 mi) south-west of Admiral along the course of Notukeu Creek in the Rural Municipality of Grassy Creek No. 78. Notukeu Creek is a tributary of the Wood River in the Old Wives Lake watershed. The reservoir is impounded by Admiral Dam, which was built in 1948.

== Fish species ==
Fish commonly found in Admiral Reservoir include yellow perch, white sucker, and walleye.

== See also ==
- List of lakes of Saskatchewan
- Dams and reservoirs in Saskatchewan
