= Reed Lake =

Lake in Saskatchewan, Canada

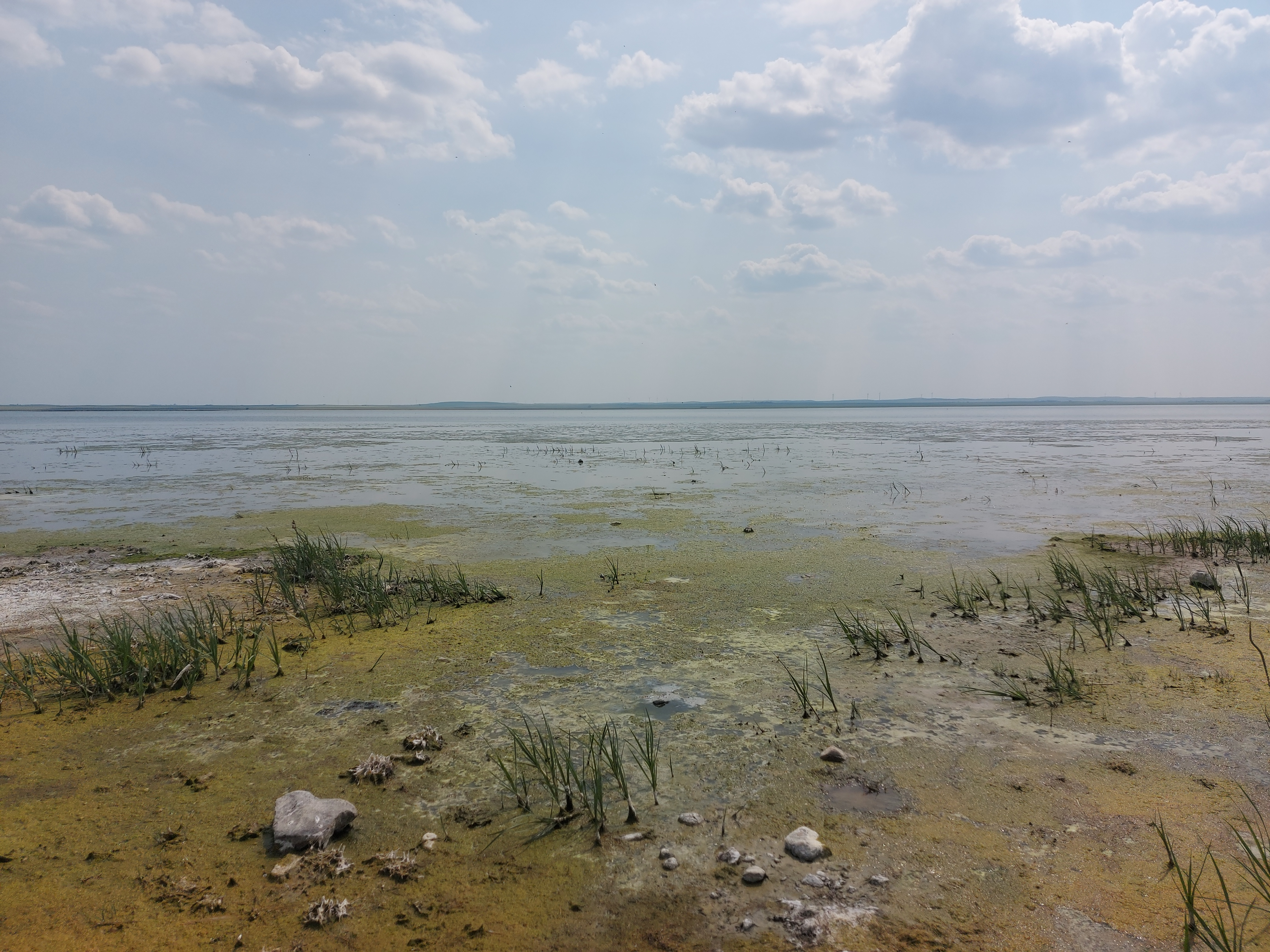
- Reed Lake

- Location in Saskatchewan Reed Lake (Canada)
- Location: RM of Morse No. 165, Saskatchewan
- Coordinates: 50.4001°N 107.0839°W
- Type: Endorheic lake
- Part of: Wood River drainage basin
- Primary inflows: Lizard Creek; Morse Creek
- Primary outflows: None
- Basin countries: Canada
- Max. length: 14 km (8.7 mi)
- Max. width: 3.5 km (2.2 mi)
- Surface elevation: 687 m (2,254 ft)

Reed Lake is an intermittent, shallow endorheic salt lake in the south-western region of the Canadian province of Saskatchewan. Most of the lake and its shoreline is designated an Important Bird Area (IBA) of Canada and it is part of a Western Hemisphere Shorebird Reserve Network (WHSRN). Access to the lake is from a lookout tower and a walking path alongside the Trans-Canada Highway, about 2.4 kilometres (1.5 mi) west of the town of Morse.

== Description ==
Being an endorheic lake, Reed Lake has no outflow. Inflow depends mainly on spring runoff and, as such, the lake is prone to significant fluctuations in water levels. The primary inflow is Lizard Creek which is located at the western end of Reed Lake. Rushlake Creek, which begins at Wood Mountain Hills, is a major tributary of Lizard Creek.

Morse, located at the north-eastern corner of Reed Lake, is the only community along its shores. At the north-western end of the lake, about 7 kilometres (4.3 mi) east of Herbert, is a Richardson International grain terminal. The Trans-Canada Highway runs along the entire length of the northern shore.

== IBA & WHSRN ==
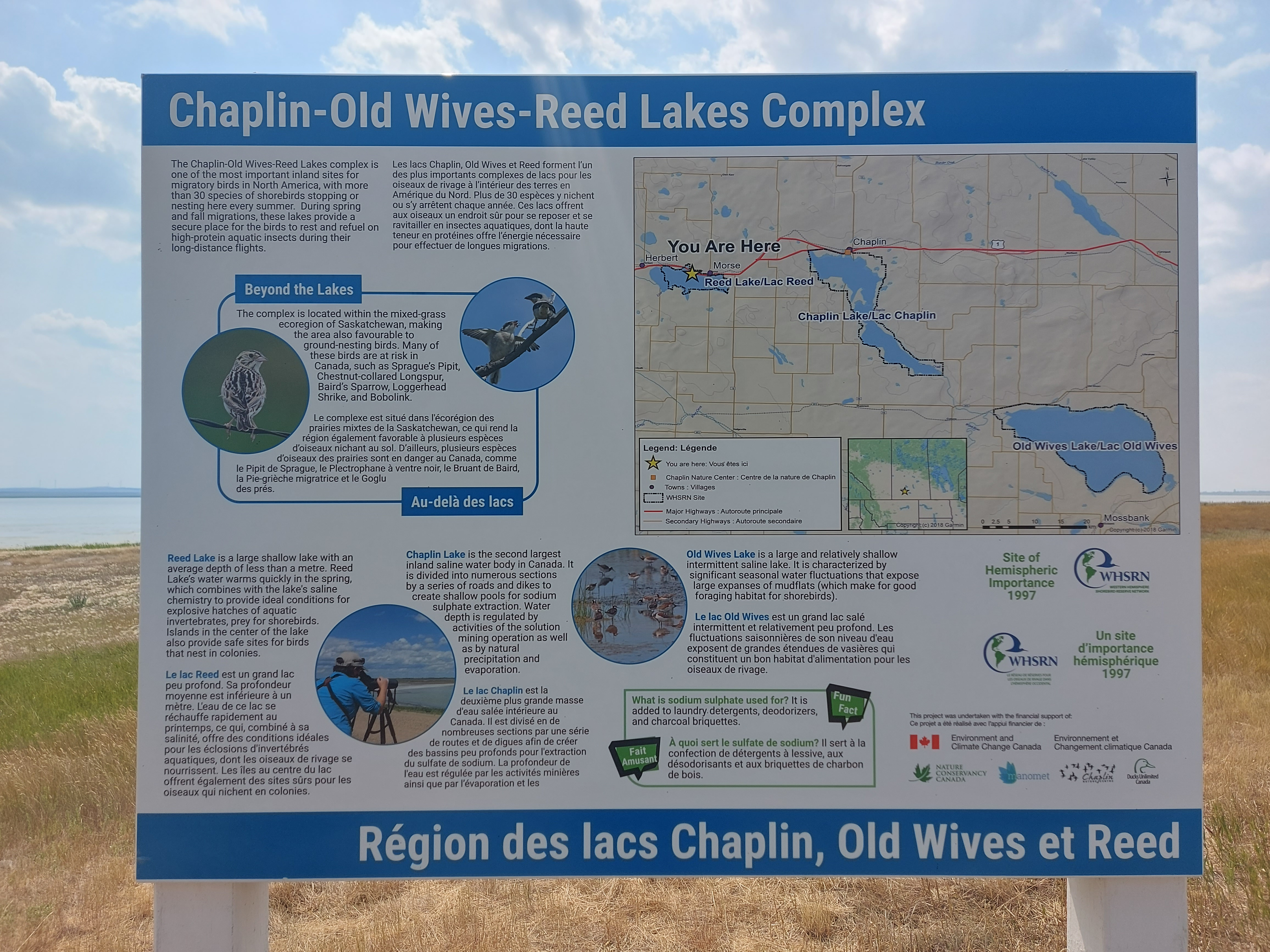
Chaplin - Old Wives - Reed Lakes WHSRN

Reed Lake (SK 034) is an Important Bird Area (IBA) of Canada and it, along with neighbouring Chaplin and Old Wives Lakes, is part of a Western Hemisphere Shorebird Reserve Network (WHSRN). The WHSRN is one of only three such sites in Canada and the only one that is located inland. The other two sites are the Fraser River estuary and Bay of Fundy. The Chaplin / Old Wives / Reed Lakes WHSRN totals about 42,680 ha (105,500 acres). The Reed Lake IBA is 58.92 ha (145.6 acres).

Birds commonly found at the lake include the piping plover, double-crested cormorant, American white pelican, northern shoveler, canvasback, Franklin's gull, snow goose, tundra swan, stilt sandpiper, and the redhead.

== Gallery ==
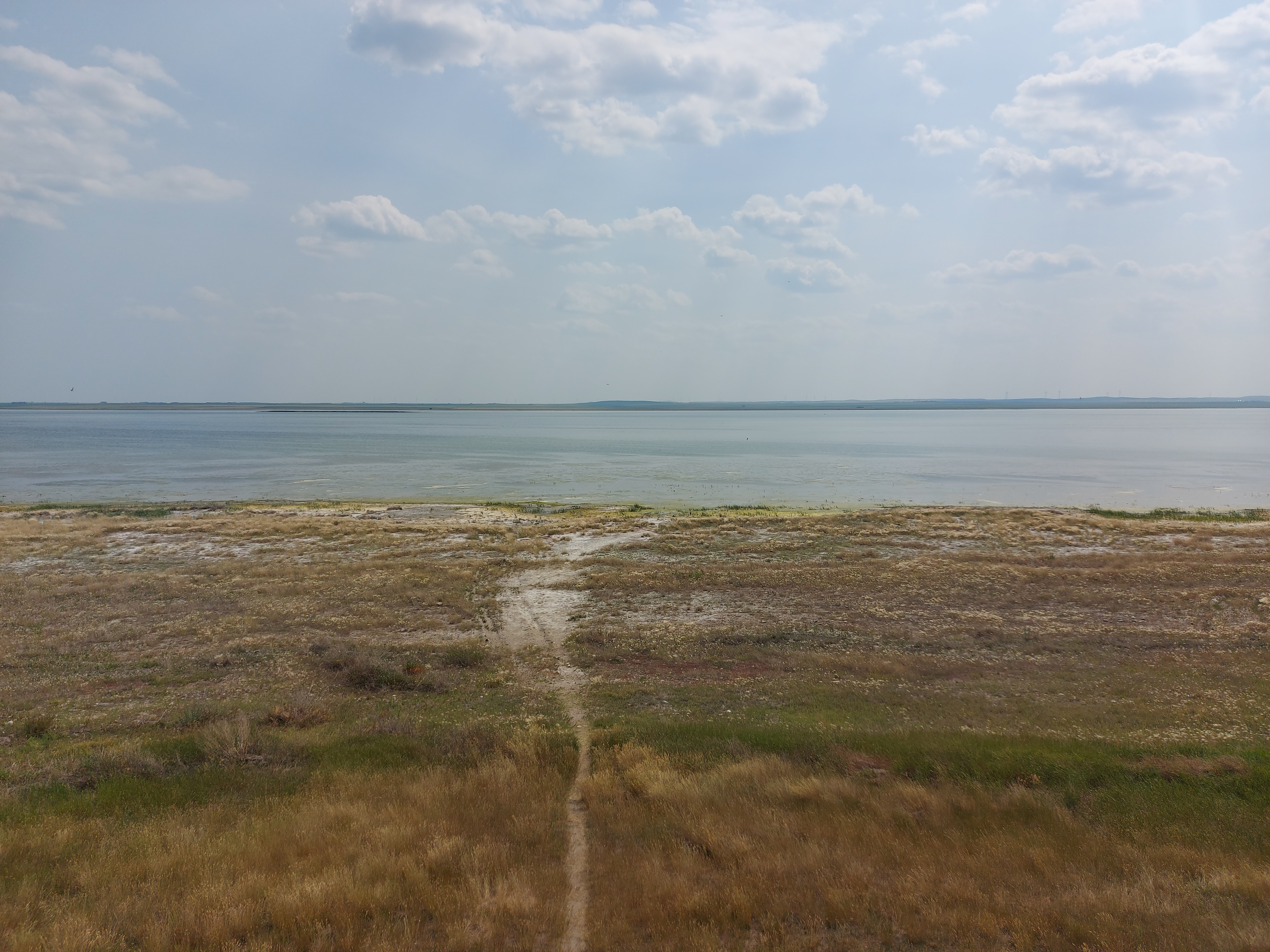
A trail leading to Reed Lake

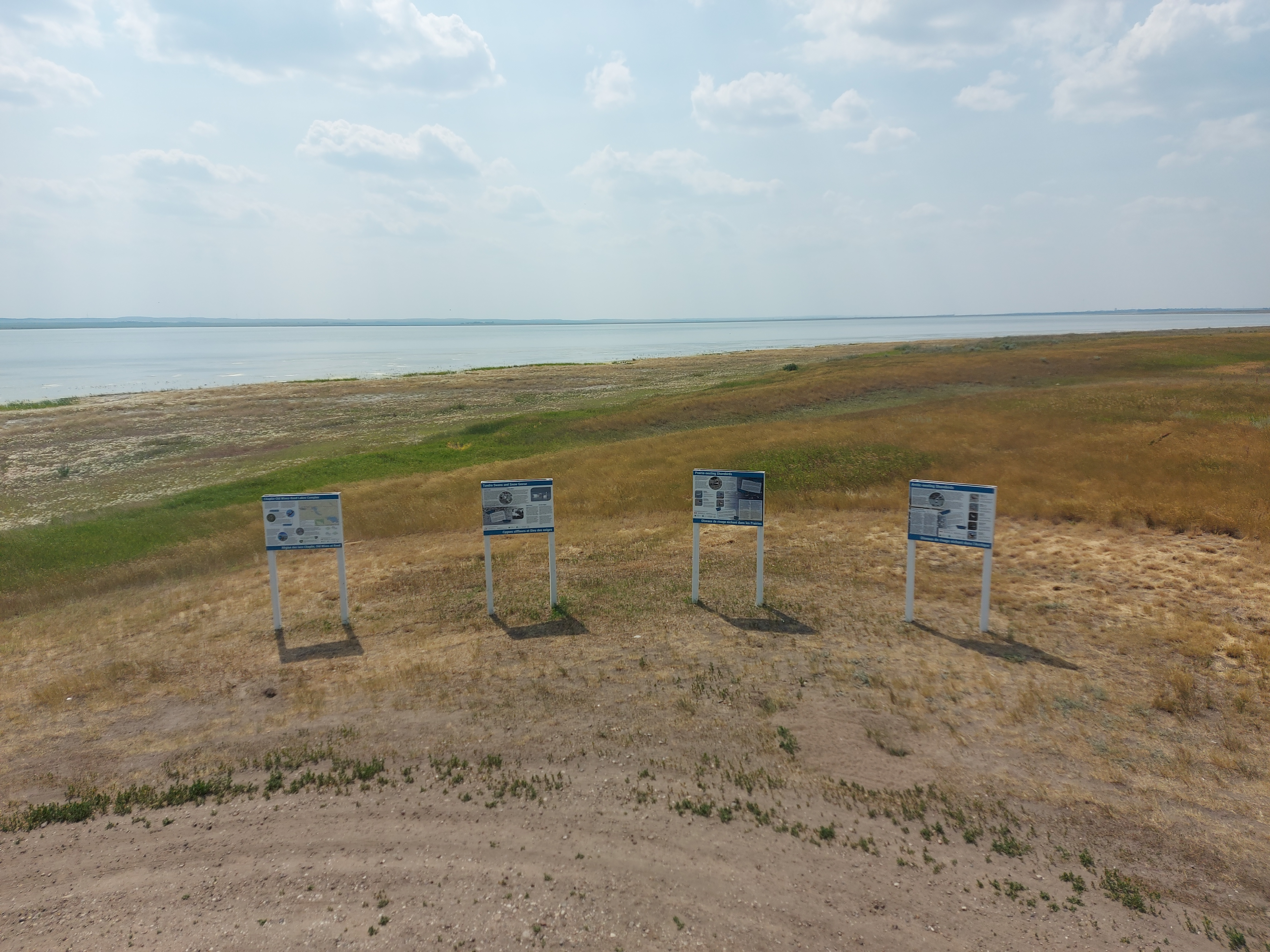
Reed Lake view from the lookout tower

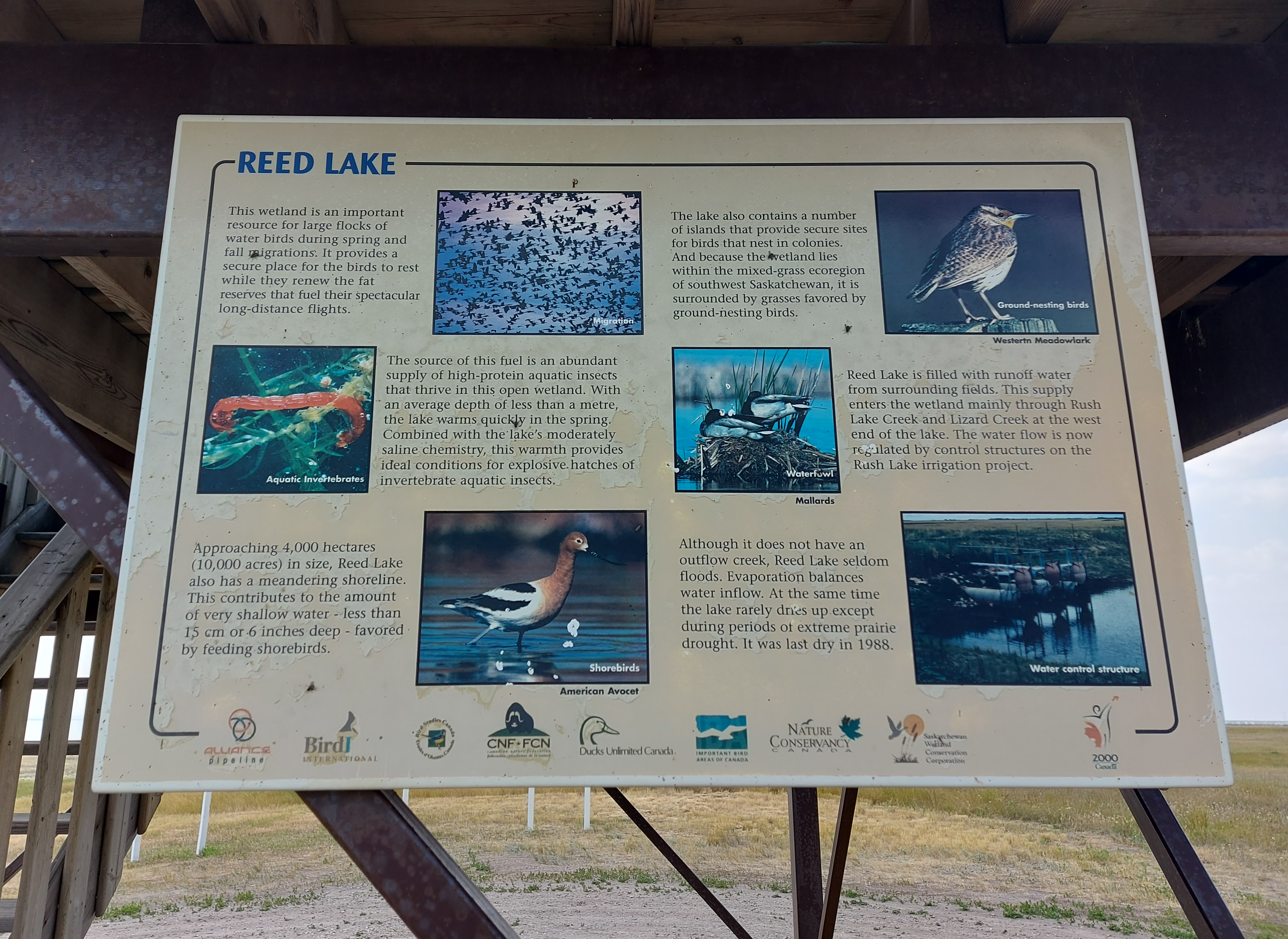
Reed Lake information sign

== See also ==
- List of lakes of Saskatchewan
- Tourism in Saskatchewan
- List of protected areas of Saskatchewan
