= Crichton, Saskatchewan =

Community in Saskatchewan, Canada

Crichton
- Unincorporated community
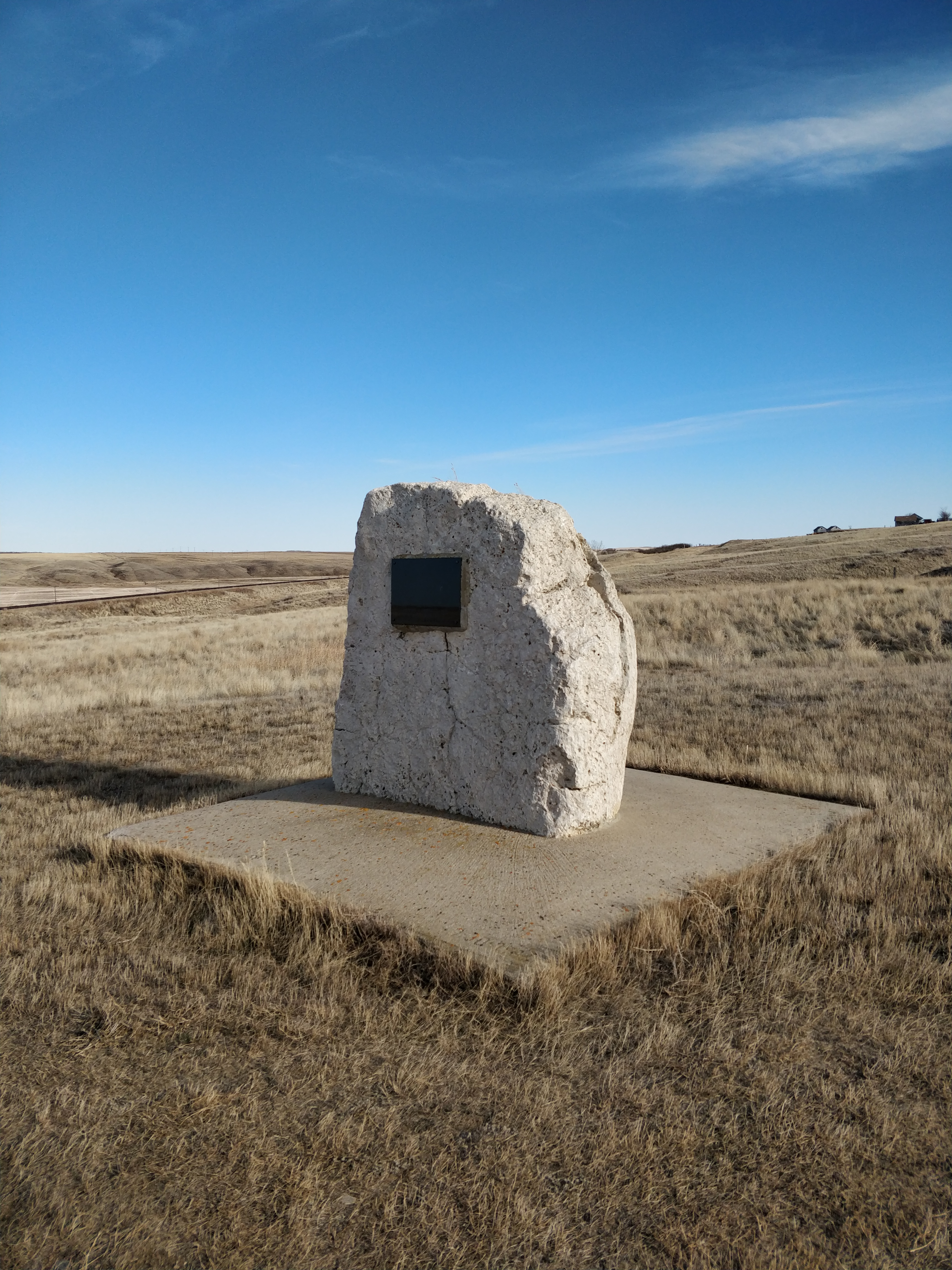
- Monument commemorating Crichton's last resident

- Location of Crichton in Saskatchewan Crichton (Saskatchewan)
- Coordinates: 49°43′25″N 107°52′33″W
- Country: Canada
- Province: Saskatchewan
- Region: Saskatchewan
- Census division: 4
- Rural Municipality: Wise Creek No. 77
- Established: 1909
- Incorporated (Village): N/A
- Incorporated (Town): N/A

Government
  - Governing body: Wise Creek No. 77

Population (2008)
  - Total: 1
- Postal code: S0N 2G0
- Area code: 306
- Highways: Highway 13
- Waterways: Notukeu Creek

Crichton (/ˈkreɪtən/ KRAY-tən) is an unincorporated community within the Rural Municipality of Wise Creek No. 77, Saskatchewan, Canada. It is located between Admiral and Cadillac on Highway 13, also known as the historic Red Coat Trail. Like so many towns along the Red Coat Trail, Crichton has become a ghost town with only one family remaining and many empty buildings scattered throughout the town site.

== History ==
From July 25 to 29, 1913, a survey began by a man named David Townsend from Calgary, Alberta, plotted out the new community. Residents of the community decided that the name of their community should be after Scottish poet and scholar, James Crichton, born in Perthshire in 1560.

During its day as an incorporated settlement, Crichton had three grain elevators (all have been torn down), a school that has been moved to a nearby bible camp, a café and pool hall, a garage that still stands on main street, boarding house, a blacksmith shop, lumberyard, post office, livery barn, water tower (torn down in the 1960s), and a large warehouse attached to the general store. There were even a golf course and tennis courts built for the community, as well as a baseball diamond near the school site. Today Crichton has one resident, and a few scattered buildings sitting abandoned.

== See also ==
- List of communities in Saskatchewan
- Lists of ghost towns in Canada
- List of ghost towns in Saskatchewan
