= Chaplin, Saskatchewan =

Village in Saskatchewan, Canada

Chaplin
- Village
- Village of Chaplin
- Aerial view (2026)

- Location of Chaplin in Saskatchewan Chaplin (Canada)
- Coordinates: 50.273°N 106.391°W
- Country: Canada
- Province: Saskatchewan
- Census division: 7
- Rural Municipality: Chaplin

Government
  - Type: Municipal
  - Governing body: Chaplin Village Council
  - Mayor: Gary Adrian
  - Administrator: Raegan Funk

Area
  - Land: 1.26 km^{2} (0.49 sq mi)

Population (2016)
  - Total: 229
  - Density: 182/km^{2} (470/sq mi)
- Time zone: UTC-6 (CST)
- Postal code: S0H 0V0
- Area code: 306
- Highways: Highway 1 Highway 19
- Railways: Canadian Pacific Railway
- Website: Village of Chaplin

Chaplin (2016 population: 229) is a village in the Canadian province of Saskatchewan within the Rural Municipality of Chaplin No. 164 and Census Division No. 7. The community is situated on the Trans-Canada Highway approximately 85 kilometres (53 mi) from Moose Jaw and 90 km from Swift Current. The main industries of Chaplin are Saskatchewan Minerals and farming/ranching.

== History ==
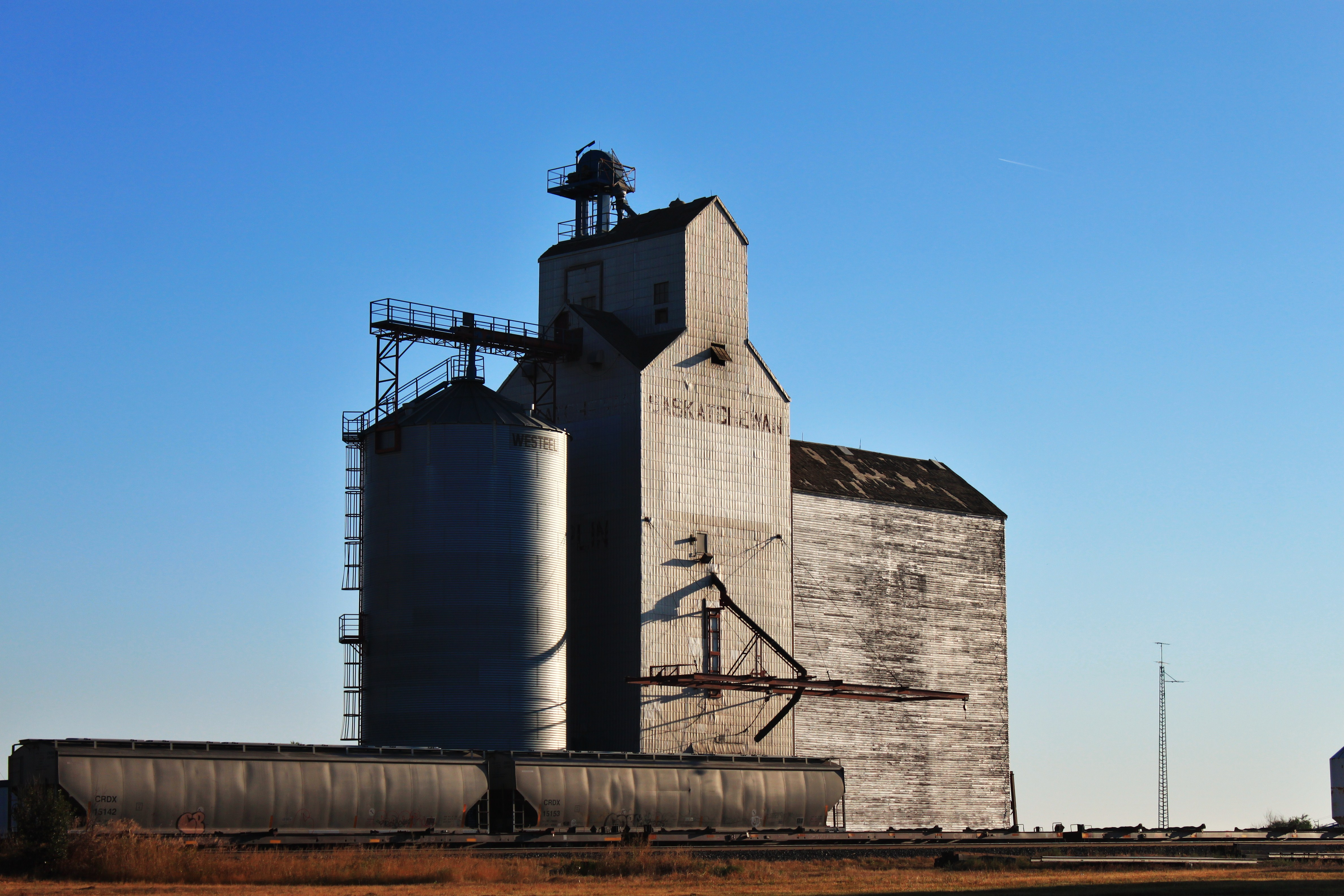
The Former Saskatchewan Wheat Pool grain elevator in Chaplin

Chaplin incorporated as a village on 8 October 1912.

== Geography ==
Chaplin is situated on the Trans-Canada Highway between Moose Jaw and Swift Current, and on the north edge of Chaplin Lake. The lake encompasses nearly 20 square miles (52 km^{2}).

== Demographics ==
Population history (1981–2016)
Year	Pop.	±%
1981	389	—
1986	399	+2.6%
1991	332	−16.8%
1996	314	−5.4%
2001	292	−7.0%
2006	235	−19.5%
2011	218	−7.2%
2016	229	+5.0%
Source: Statistics Canada via Saskatchewan Bureau of Statistics

In the 2021 Census of Population conducted by Statistics Canada, Chaplin had a population of 222 living in 104 of its 134 total private dwellings, a change of −3.1% from its 2016 population of 229. With a land area of 1.15 km^{2} (0.44 sq mi), it had a population density of 193.0/km^{2} (500.0/sq mi) in 2021.

In the 2016 Census of Population, the Village of Chaplin recorded a population of 229 living in 111 of its 146 total private dwellings, a 4.8% change from its 2011 population of 218. With a land area of 1.26 km^{2} (0.49 sq mi), it had a population density of 181.7/km^{2} (470.7/sq mi) in 2016.

== Government ==
Chaplin is governed by an elected Mayor and five councilors. The village employs a Village Administrator, Village Foreperson, and on Saturdays an additional individual works at the Village Dump administering public waste disposal (there is also weekly curb-side trash pick-up).

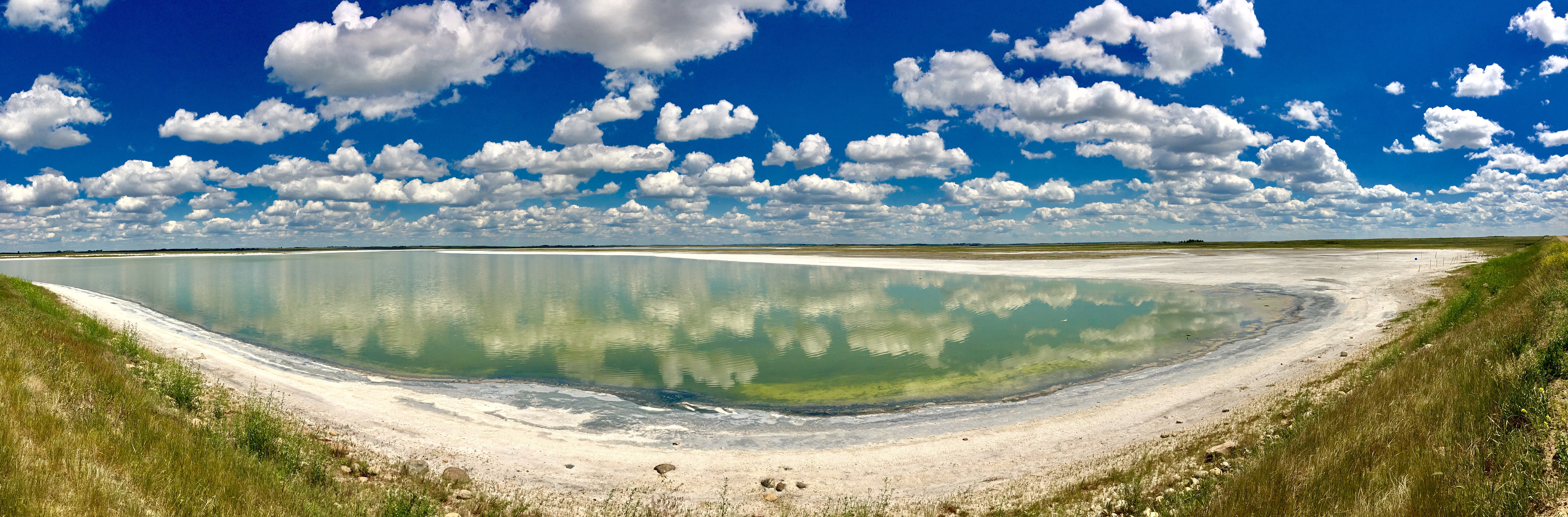
Shore of Chaplin Lake

== Climate ==
Climate data for Chaplin
Month	Jan	Feb	Mar	Apr	May	Jun	Jul	Aug	Sep	Oct	Nov	Dec	Year
Record high °C (°F)	11.5 (52.7)	15 (59)	23.9 (75.0)	32.8 (91.0)	36.7 (98.1)	42.8 (109.0)	40.6 (105.1)	42.8 (109.0)	38.9 (102.0)	30.6 (87.1)	22.2 (72.0)	17.8 (64.0)	42.8 (109.0)
Mean daily maximum °C (°F)	−8 (18)	−5.1 (22.8)	2.3 (36.1)	11.4 (52.5)	18.5 (65.3)	23.2 (73.8)	25.6 (78.1)	24.9 (76.8)	18.4 (65.1)	11.8 (53.2)	0.4 (32.7)	−6.3 (20.7)	9.8 (49.6)
Daily mean °C (°F)	−13 (9)	−10.1 (13.8)	−3 (27)	5 (41)	11.8 (53.2)	16.5 (61.7)	18.8 (65.8)	17.9 (64.2)	11.7 (53.1)	5.5 (41.9)	−4.5 (23.9)	−11.3 (11.7)	3.8 (38.8)
Mean daily minimum °C (°F)	−17.8 (0.0)	−15 (5)	−8.2 (17.2)	−1.5 (29.3)	5 (41)	9.8 (49.6)	11.9 (53.4)	10.9 (51.6)	4.9 (40.8)	−0.8 (30.6)	−9.2 (15.4)	−16.2 (2.8)	−2.2 (28.0)
Record low °C (°F)	−47.2 (−53.0)	−44.4 (−47.9)	−41.7 (−43.1)	−26.7 (−16.1)	−13.9 (7.0)	−6.7 (19.9)	1.1 (34.0)	−2.2 (28.0)	−12.2 (10.0)	−26.1 (−15.0)	−40 (−40)	−40.6 (−41.1)	−47.2 (−53.0)
Average precipitation mm (inches)	14 (0.6)	15.7 (0.62)	20.2 (0.80)	19.7 (0.78)	53.5 (2.11)	60.4 (2.38)	62.3 (2.45)	47.1 (1.85)	35 (1.4)	13.6 (0.54)	11.9 (0.47)	19.3 (0.76)	386.3 (15.21)
Source: Environment Canada

== See also ==
- List of communities in Saskatchewan
- List of villages in Saskatchewan
