= Mossbank, Saskatchewan =

Town in Saskatchewan, Canada

Mossbank
- Town
- Motto: Gateway to Old Wives Lake
- Location of Mossbank in Saskatchewan Mossbank (Canada)
- Coordinates: 49.94054°N 105.96751°W
- Country: Canada
- Province: Saskatchewan
- Established: 1907
- Post office established: 1909

Government
  - Governing body: Town Council

Area
  - Total: 1.75 km^{2} (0.68 sq mi)

Population (2016)
  - Total: 360
  - Density: 205.6/km^{2} (533/sq mi)
- Postal code: S0H 3G0
- Area codes: 306, 639
- Website: Official website

Mossbank is a town in the Canadian province of Saskatchewan. The town is south of Old Wives Lake and 68 km south of Moose Jaw.

== History ==
Mossbank was incorporated in 1912 as an extension of the railroad from Expanse. The townsite was chosen by the Canadian National Railway (CNR) rail line with an adjacent townsite of Raycraft being established to the north by the Canadian Pacific Railway (CPR) rail line.

A number of significant historical events have taken place in Mossbank and area. Three of the most prominent were the first meeting between a First Nations people and the North-West Mounted Police (NWMP); the establishment of the British Commonwealth Air Training Plan (BCATP) No. 2 Bombing and Gunnery School; and the famous 1957 Debate between Saskatchewan Premier Tommy Douglas and Ross Thatcher, who would later also serve as Premier of Saskatchewan. Mossbank is also the location of the Ambroz Blacksmith Shop and Residence Provincial Heritage Property.

=== First meeting between the NWMP and a First Nations group ===
In 1874, during the famous Great March West, the NWMP camped at Old Wives Lake, north of the current location of Mossbank. Their camp was located near where Wood River enters Old Wives Lake. Shortly after establishing their campsite, the NWMP were approached by a scout for a group of Sioux refugees. His group was originally from Minnesota but had fled the state after being displaced from their lands there. They hoped that the British government would consider giving them sanctuary in Canada. The NWMP agreed to meet with the Sioux the next day. The NWMP wanted to make a strong impression on the group as they were the first group of First Nations that had encountered so far in their trek westward. The entire Sioux contingent consisting of over one hundred men, women and children visited the NWMP camp the following day and the two participated in both formal ceremonies and informal trading that lasted several days.

In 2009, the first Old Wives Lake Festival was held in Mossbank. The festival commemorated the first meeting of the NWMP with the Sioux with a special ceremony involving local re-enactors and RCMP officers and First Nations re-enactors.

=== The No. 2 Bombing and Gunnery School ===
In 1939, shortly after the start of World War II, Canada agreed to contribute to the war effort by being home for the British Commonwealth Air Training Program (BCATP). The Training Plan turned into a huge operation, one that cost Canada $1.6 billion and employed 104,000 Canadians who operated 107 schools and 184 other supporting units at 231 locations all across Canada. At the conclusion of the war, over 167,000 students, including over 50,000 pilots, had trained in Canada under the program. There were 131,553 graduates including 72,835 Canadians. The BCATP No. 2 Bombing and Gunnery School was built outside of Mossbank and between 1940 and 1944 trained over 6241 men from all four participating nations. The Mossbank base employed around 2,200 people and was one of 11 Bombing and Gunnery Schools across Canada. It trained more personnel than any other school except the No. 1 School in Jarvis, Ontario. It offered instruction in the techniques of bomb aiming and machine-gunning to Air Observers, Bomb Aimers, and Wireless Air Gunners. Mossbank was selected because it has large areas to accommodate bombing and gunnery ranges, and is located near Old Wives Lake, which was also useful for target practice.

Following the end of the war, the base was decommissioned and almost all the base's buildings were sold and moved off the site. Among these buildings, one became the Turvey Centre in Regina and another is now part of the Western Development Museum in North Battleford. A large historic monument commemorating the base was dedicated in 1999 by the Mossbank and District Museum and the Saskatchewan History and Folklore Society. The Mossbank and District Museum contains an extensive collection of artifacts from the base as well as a mural showing an aerial view of the base as it would have existed around 1943.

=== Debate of the Century ===
In 1957, the Mossbank Community Hall was the site of a debate between Saskatchewan Premier Tommy Douglas and Ross Thatcher. The debate attracted national attention with reporters from all over Canada in attendance along with well over 1,000 spectators, who attended despite terrible rain. The debate took place because in 1955, Thatcher, who had been a Member of Parliament for Moose Jaw for the Cooperative Commonwealth Federation (CCF), had left that party and shortly thereafter joined the Liberal Party of Canada. Later, in a debate in the House of Commons, Thatcher criticized the Crown corporation policy of Douglas's CCF government in Saskatchewan by describing it as a "dismal failure." douglas was incensed by Thatcher's remarks and challenged him to debate the issue of Saskatchewan's Crown corporation anywhere and anytime. Thatcher, who was now running for the Liberals in the 1957 federal election in the Assiniboia constituency, which included Mossbank, accepted the invitation but stipulated the debate would be in Mossbank. it was generally understood that he selected Mossbank because the Liberals were traditionally strong in the area. The debate took place on May 20 and was a raucous event, with both Douglas and Thatcher performing well. The debate was broadcast live via radio across the province, however, which favoured Thatcher since he stuck to a prepared text, but Douglas more or less had no script and so gave the radio audience the impression that he was less sure of himself. Although Thatcher lost the 1957 election, his performance in the debate raised his profile considerably and played a major role in his later election as leader of the Saskatchewan Liberal Party and then in 1964 as Saskatchewan Premier.

In 2003, a historical re-enactment of the 1957 event called "The Debate of the Century," was staged and sold out two performances. A large interpretative panel explaining the debate is located in the foyer of the Mossbank Community Hall, where the debate took place. The two streets in Mossbank on each side of the Mossbank Community Hall are named Douglas Street and Thatcher Street.

=== Ambroz Blacksmith Shop and Residence Provincial Heritage Property ===
Mossbank is also home of the Ambroz Blacksmith Shop and Residence Provincial Heritage Property which is part of the Mossbank and District Museum. The property received its provincial designation in 2003. It was designated because it is the oldest known, fully furnished blacksmith shop still on its original site in Saskatchewan. Originally constructed around 1920, the shop was purchased by Polish immigrant Frank Ambroz in 1928. For the following 60 years, Ambroz operated the shop and lived with his family on the property. The existence of the family residence, and three associated outbuildings, form a rare example of a 1920s family business complex. in Saskatchewan.

== Demographics ==
In the 2021 Census of Population conducted by Statistics Canada, Mossbank had a population of 368 living in 170 of its 191 total private dwellings, a change of 2.2% from its 2016 population of 360. With a land area of 1.56 km^{2} (0.60 sq mi), it had a population density of 235.9/km^{2} (611.0/sq mi) in 2021.

Canada census – Mossbank community profile

	2021	2016	2011
Population	368 (+2.2% from 2016)	360 (10.1% from 2011)	327 (-0.9% from 2006)
Land area	1.56 km^{2} (0.60 sq mi)	1.75 km^{2} (0.68 sq mi)	1.75 km^{2} (0.68 sq mi)
Population density	236.5/km^{2} (613/sq mi)	205.6/km^{2} (533/sq mi)	186.8/km^{2} (484/sq mi)
Median age	41.2 (M: 36.8, F: 50.8)	46.0 (M: 40.2, F: 50.7)	51.5 (M: 48.0, F: 54.6)
Private dwellings	170 (total)	182 (total)	193 (total)
Median household income

References: 2021 2016 2011

== Economy ==
The main industry of the community is agriculture. There is speculation about the possibilities of oil and gas expansion into the area. An oriental noodle factory was built in Mossbank in 1980 with help from government grants and local investors. The venture flopped three years later. Since then, after five different owners, three unstable labels and a consecutive run-time of only three months, the factory finally shut its doors forever in the early 2000s.

== Attractions ==
Called the Gateway to Old Wives Lake, the community lies 10 km south of Old Wives Lake which is North America's third largest inland saltwater body and 8 km west of Lake of the Rivers which are both major staging areas for waterfowl. Old Wives Lake is a nesting area for the vulnerable piping plover. Old Wives Lake is also on a major migratory path for snow and Canada geese.

The community has developed a set of birdwatching trails on the shores of Old Wives Lake north of Mossbank. The trails are equipped with gazebos, rest areas, and washroom facilities where nature enthusiasts can come enjoy the natural prairie habitat. Birdwatchers can come to see sanderlings, avocets, and dozens of other shorebirds.

Just north of the community, the North-West Mounted Police first met the First Nations peoples during the historic March West which was supposed to deal with the Cypress Hills Massacre. The Mounties then set up a camp just south of the lake. The area was also a legendary battleground for the First Nations peoples. There is an Aboriginal legend that claims that the lake is haunted. Generations ago there was a drought and food was scarce. The Cree people began moving south into traditional Blackfoot territory in search of food and made camp in the hills of Old Wives Lake. The Blackfoot sent a war party to attack the Cree. When the Cree found out they made a decision to get out of the area immediately but were worried that the Blackfoot would catch up to them. The older women of the tribe decided that they would keep the campfires burning throughout the night to fool the Blackfoot into thinking that the camp was still there while the rest of the camp escaped. When the Blackfoot arrived at morning they were so enraged to find the camp vacant except for the old women they slaughtered them all. The legend of Old Wives Lake says that old women can be heard laughing over the water about how they tricked their attackers.

When pioneers first arrived in the start of the 1900s they had written that the area was full of rock piles which they had thought were Indian graves and buffalo skulls from the great buffalo slaughter in the 1800s. Old Wives Lake was renamed by the early Canadian government to Lake Johnstone after a famous buffalo trophy hunter who was known for his participation in the buffalo slaughter. The lake was renamed back to its aboriginal name in the 1950s after a push from local citizens.

Just east of the town is the RCAF gunnery and training school which was used during the Second World War as a training school for fighter pilots. This has now been converted into a golf course. The site of the birdwatching trails south of Old Wives Lake was home to the RCAF gunnery and bombing range during the Second World War. Remnants of the facilities can still be found in the locations. Some artifacts that have been found include antique ammunition and explosives.

== See also ==
- List of towns in Saskatchewan
