= Wood River (Saskatchewan) =

River in Saskatchewan, Canada

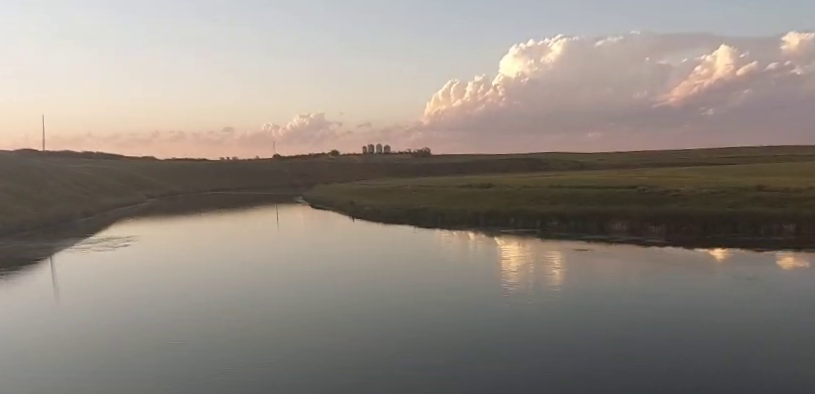
- Wood River

- Location of the mouth in Saskatchewan Wood River (Saskatchewan) (Canada)

Location
- Country: Canada
- Provinces: Saskatchewan

Physical characteristics
- Source: Pinto Butte
  - location: RM of Glen McPherson No. 46
  - coordinates: 49.3667°N 107.4012°W
  - elevation: 1,010 m (3,310 ft)
- Mouth: Old Wives Lake
  - location: RM of Rodgers No. 133
  - coordinates: 50.1443°N 106.2034°W
  - elevation: 663 m (2,175 ft)

Basin features
- Tributaries
  - left: Chaplin Creek; Wiwa Creek; Pinto Creek; Notukeu Creek
  - right: Cripple Creek; Lafleche Creek; Lynthorpe Creek; Flynn Creek

Wood River is a river in the Canadian province of Saskatchewan. It has its source in the Wood Mountain Hills of south-western Saskatchewan and flows in a north-easterly direction to its mouth at Old Wives Lake. Old Wives Lake is a saltwater lake with no outflow. As a result, the drainage basin of Wood River is an endorheic one. Along the course of the river, there are several parks, historical sites, and small towns.

Wood River was the inspiration for the famous Canadian folk song by the same name written by Connie Kaldor and sung nationwide by Canadian choirs. The song is considered by many to be the quintessential Saskatchewan song.

== Course and description ==
Wood River begins in south-western Saskatchewan at the height of the Wood Mountain Hills in semi-arid grasslands within a large region called Palliser's Triangle. Much of the northern half of Wood Mountain Hills is in the Wood River watershed while the southern half flows south into the United States and the drainage basin of the Milk River — a tributary of the Missouri River. This part of the drainage divide is known as the Missouri Coteau. Beginning at Pinto Butte at over 1,000 metres (3,300 ft) in elevation, Wood River flows eastward through grasslands, rolling hills, and valleys that were carved by glacial meltwaters. Near the small community of Summercove, the river turns north-east and begins to head out of the hills where it is joined by several tributaries. Along the route, south of Gravelbourg, a dam was built that created Thomson Lake. On the eastern shore of the lake is Thomson Lake Regional Park, the oldest regional park in Saskatchewan. Gravelbourg, the largest town along the river's course, is about 12 kilometres (7.5 mi) downstream from the dam. After Gravelbourg, the river continues north-east, passes by Shamrock Regional Park, and flows into the western end of Old Wives Lake. Old Wives Lake is part of an Important Bird Area (IBA) of Canada and, along with Reed and Chaplin Lakes, was designated part of the Western Hemisphere Shorebird Reserve Network (WHSRN).

=== Tributaries ===
The following are the tributaries of Wood River from its upper watershed in the Wood Mountain Hills to its mouth at Old Wives Lake:

- Tetreau Creek
  - Patriotic Creek
- McCrea Creek
  - Uteck Creek
- Kolskeg Creek
- McDonald Creek
- Gavelin Creek
- Six Mile Creek
  - Sisterbutte Creek
    - Nine Mile Creek
      - Ten Mile Creek
  - Chubey Creek
- Flynn Creek
  - Stephton Creek
- Lynthorpe Creek
  - Wood Mountain Creek
  - Gollier Creek
- Lafleche Creek
- Pinto Creek
  - Laville Creek
- Notukeu Creek
  - Grassy Creek
  - Bull Creek
  - Russell Creek
- Cripple Creek
- Wiwa Creek
  - East Wiwa Creek
- Chaplin Creek

=== Lakes and reservoirs ===
There are several notable lakes and reservoirs within the Wood River watershed. Due to the semi-arid conditions in the region of Palliser's Triangle, several reservoirs were built to retain water for irrigation and consumption.

- Summercove Dam (49.3278°N 107.0367°W) is west of Summercove on Wood River. The dam is 8.5 m (28 ft) high and the reservoir it creates contains 1,973 dam^{3} (1,600 acre⋅ft) of water. It was built in 1949 and upgraded in c. 1965. It is owned and operated by the Saskatchewan Water Security Agency.
- Braddock Reservoir is along the course of Wiwa Creek.
- Chaplin Lake is the source of Chaplin Creek.
- Midtskogen Lake is connected to Chaplin Lake.
- Thomson Lake is along the course of Wood River.
- Twelve Mile Lake is the source of Lynthorpe Creek.
- Gouverneur Reservoir is along the course of Notukeu Creek.
- Admiral Reservoir is along the course of Notukeu Creek.

== Shamrock Regional Park ==
Shamrock Regional Park (50.0591°N 106.4606°W) is a regional park in the RM of Shamrock No. 134 along the course of Wood River. Founded in 1961, it is one of the oldest regional parks in Saskatchewan. The park is tucked away into a well treed, horseshoe-shaped bend in the river and has amenities such as a campground, swimming pool, picnic area, ball diamonds, fishing, hiking trails, and a 9-hole golf course. Access is south from Highway 363.

The campground has 100 electric sites and shower and laundry facilities. The golf course, which opened in 1965, has sand greens and winds its way around the river's edge.

== Historical sites ==
Along the course of the river, there are three Saskatchewan historical sites on the Canadian Register of Historic Places. A fourth site, Eason's Grove, is located on a small bluff north of Gravelbourg in the Wood River Valley that overlooks Wood River. All four sites are within the RM of Gravelbourg No. 104.

=== Cripple Creek Crossing site ===
Cripple Creek Crossing (49.9323°N 106.476°W), located at the point where Cripple Creek meets Wood River just south of Old Wives Lake, is the site of a North-West Mounted Police camp during their March West in 1874. By mid-August, the rigours of the difficult trek west left some men in poor health. It was decided to leave seven troopers, five of whom were sick, a Métis employee, and 26 weak horses behind at the camp. The camp was dubbed "cripple camp". They stayed there until Commissioner George French returned in early October on his way back east. Today, the historical site consists of 128 ha (320 acres) of fields and pasture land.

=== Trapper's Cabin site ===
Trapper's Cabin (49.9889°N 106.487°W), located near Gravelbourg, is the only surviving trapper's cabin in the area from the fur trade.

The 32 ha (79-acre) site has the remains of a small dugout shelter on the banks of Wood River that was built in the 1930s by Norman Poulin, a local Métis farmer and trapper. Poulin used trapping to supplement his farm income during the Great Depression and it is one of five such shelters he built to operate his trapline along the river. Highway 718 runs past the site.

=== Wamsley Bridge site ===
Wamsley Bridge is located about 20 kilometres (12 mi) north of Gravelbourg and is an archaeological site that contains "at least nine buried layers of butchered bison bone and hearth remains that have been partially exposed in a road cut". The site shows evidence of butchering and processing by pre-contact First Nations over many years.

=== Eason's Grove site ===
Eason's Grove (49.9851°N 106.497°W) was an unofficial recreation site that had no level of formal government organisation. From about 1907, local residents began using the area as a picnic spot and gathering site due to the natural grassy field, groves of trees, and access to Woody River. Eventually ball diamonds were constructed on the south side of the property and pick-up games were played. Use of the park started to decline by the 1960s as other government organised parks began opening up. It was officially closed in 1970 and was converted to pasture land. It is about 15 kilometres (9.3 mi) north of Gravelbourg and all that remains are the remnants of the ball diamonds and the open grassy field.

== See also ==
- List of rivers of Saskatchewan
- Hudson Bay drainage basin
- Tourism in Saskatchewan
- History of Saskatchewan
- List of endorheic basins
- Woody River, a river of a similar name in eastern Saskatchewan and western Manitoba
