= Admiral, Saskatchewan =

Community in Saskatchewan, Canada

Admiral
- Special service area
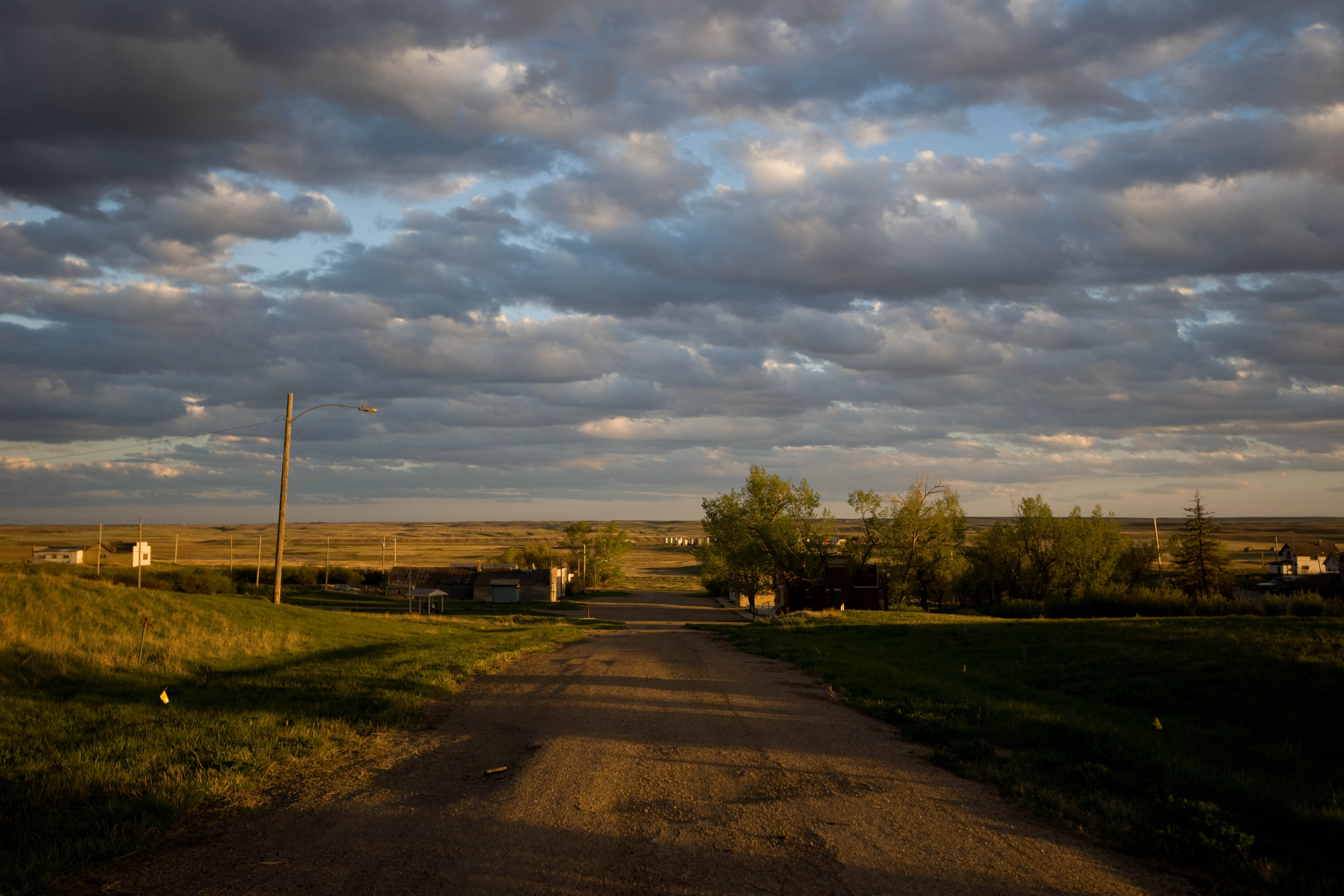
- Admiral, Saskatchewan

- Location within Saskatchewan Location within Canada
- Coordinates: 49.713°N 108.003°W
- Country: Canada
- Province: Saskatchewan
- Region: Southwest Saskatchewan
- Census division: 17
- Rural municipality: Wise Creek No. 77
- Federal riding: Cypress Hills—Grasslands
- Post office founded: February 1, 1911
- Incorporated (village): 1914
- Restructured: August 17, 2006
- Elevation: 840 m (2,750 ft)
- Time zone: CST
- Postal code: S0N 0B0
- Area code: 306
- Highways: Highway 13; Highway 629

Admiral (2016 population: 20) is a special service area within the Rural Municipality of Wise Creek No. 77 in Saskatchewan, Canada. Originally incorporated as a village in 1914, it relinquished its status when it dissolved on August 17, 2006.

Admiral is 1.6 kilometres (1 mi) south of Highway 13 (the Red Coat Trail) on the Great Western Railway, approximately 65 kilometres (40 mi) south of Swift Current. It is approximately 30 kilometres (19 mi) equidistant from Shaunavon and Ponteix to the west and east respectively. Local services are limited to a post office and Roman Catholic church.

== Etymology ==
Admiral is a CPR list name, named after the naval rank. This is consistent with other communities along the Weyburn-Lethbridge line, including Yeoman, Khedive, Viceroy, and Consul.

== Demographics ==
In the 2021 Census of Population conducted by Statistics Canada, Admiral had a population of 15 living in 8 of its 9 total private dwellings, a change of −25% from its 2016 population of 20. With a land area of 1.87 km^{2} (0.72 sq mi), it had a population density of 8.0/km^{2} (20.8/sq mi) in 2021.

Canada census – Admiral, Saskatchewan community profile

	2016
Population	20 (0% from 2011)
Land area	1.96 km^{2} (0.76 sq mi)
Population density	10.2/km^{2} (26/sq mi)
Median age	Not Available (M: Not Available, F: Not Available)
Private dwellings	10 (total)
Median household income	$Not Available

References: 2016

== Economy ==
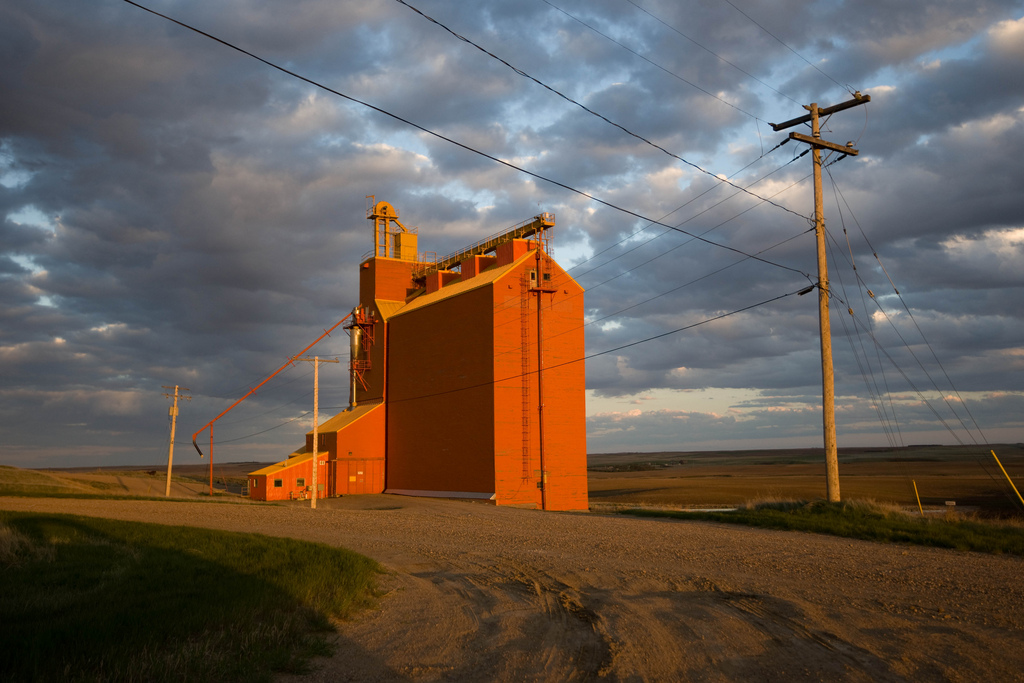
Grain elevator in Admiral

The economy of the Rural Municipality of Wise Creek No. 77 is predominantly based on agriculture including crop farming and livestock operations.

== Infrastructure ==
Saskatchewan Transportation Company provided intercity bus service to Admiral prior to its dissolution in 2017.

== See also ==
- Admiral Reservoir
- List of communities in Saskatchewan
