= Saskatchewan Minerals =

Saskatchewan Minerals Inc.
- Company type: Privately-eld
- Industry: Sodium sulphate
- Founded: 1947 as a Crown corporation
- Headquarters: Chaplin, Saskatchewan, Canada
- Products: Sodium sulphate
- Website: Homepage

Saskatchewan Minerals Inc. is a privately held company located in Saskatchewan, Canada, that mines and processes sodium sulphate. Originally established as a Crown corporation in 1947. Today the company is one of the largest producers of anhydrous sodium sulphate in North America with production capability of 285,000 tons per year. The company has won the Canada's 50 Best Managed Companies award.

Originally established in 1947 by the government of Tommy Douglas the company remained a crown corporation until privatized in 1988 by the government of Grant Devine. The primary plant has operated in Chaplin, Saskatchewan since that time. A second plant operated at Mossbank, Saskatchewan from 1954 until 1984 and third plant operated at Ingebrigt, Saskatchewan from 1966 until 1984. During the 1980s, the market shifted to requiring higher purity sodium sulphate (primarily for use in detergents) resulting in the upgrade of the original Chaplin plant and shutting down the plants producing lower grade material. The Ingebrigt facility remained in a standby condition

In 2013 the company's name was updated to Saskatchewan Mining and Minerals Inc.
