= Rural Municipality of Grassy Creek No. 78 =

Rural municipality in Saskatchewan, Canada

Grassy Creek No. 78
- Rural municipality
- Rural Municipality of Grassy Creek No. 78
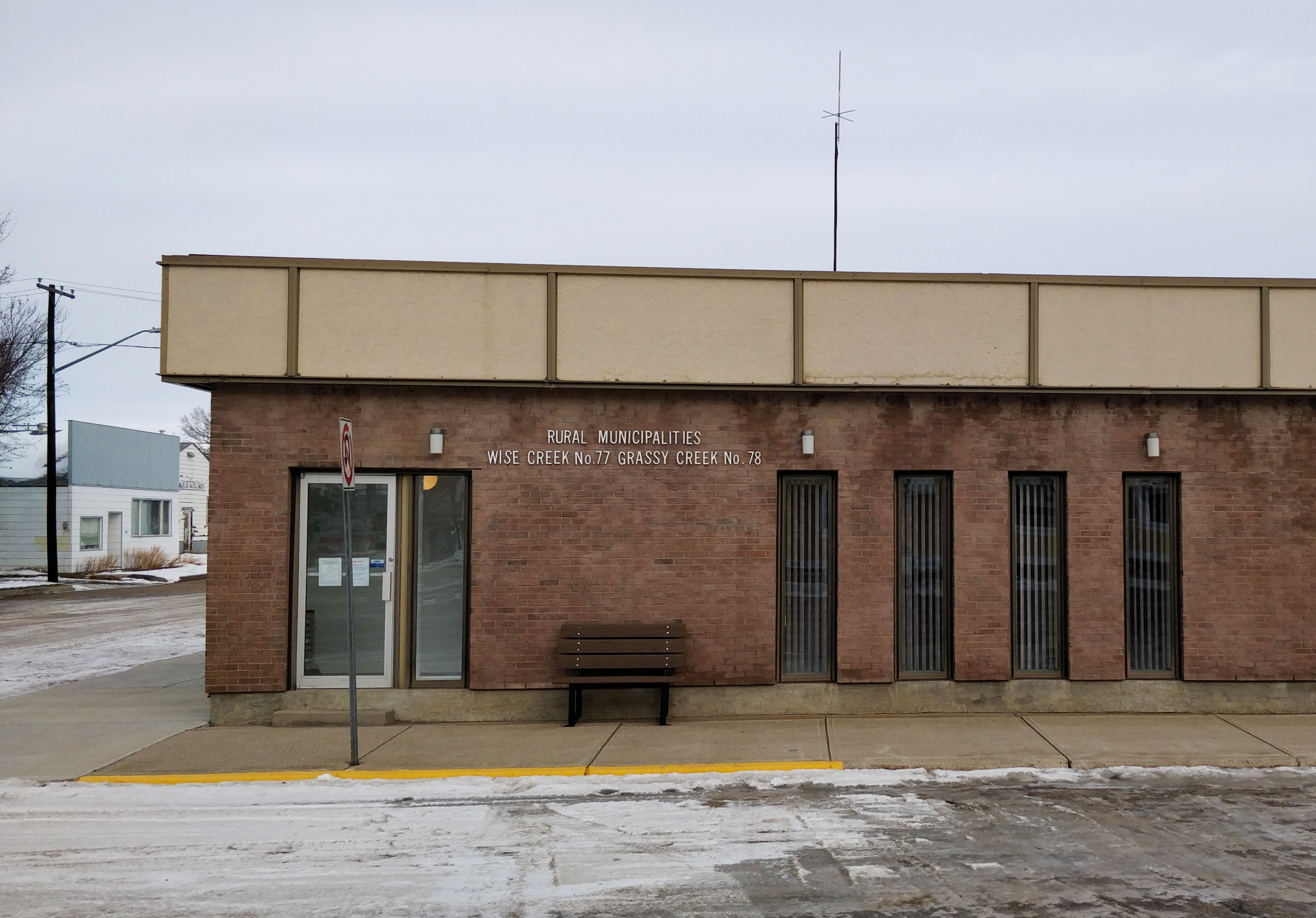
- Administrative office in Shaunavon

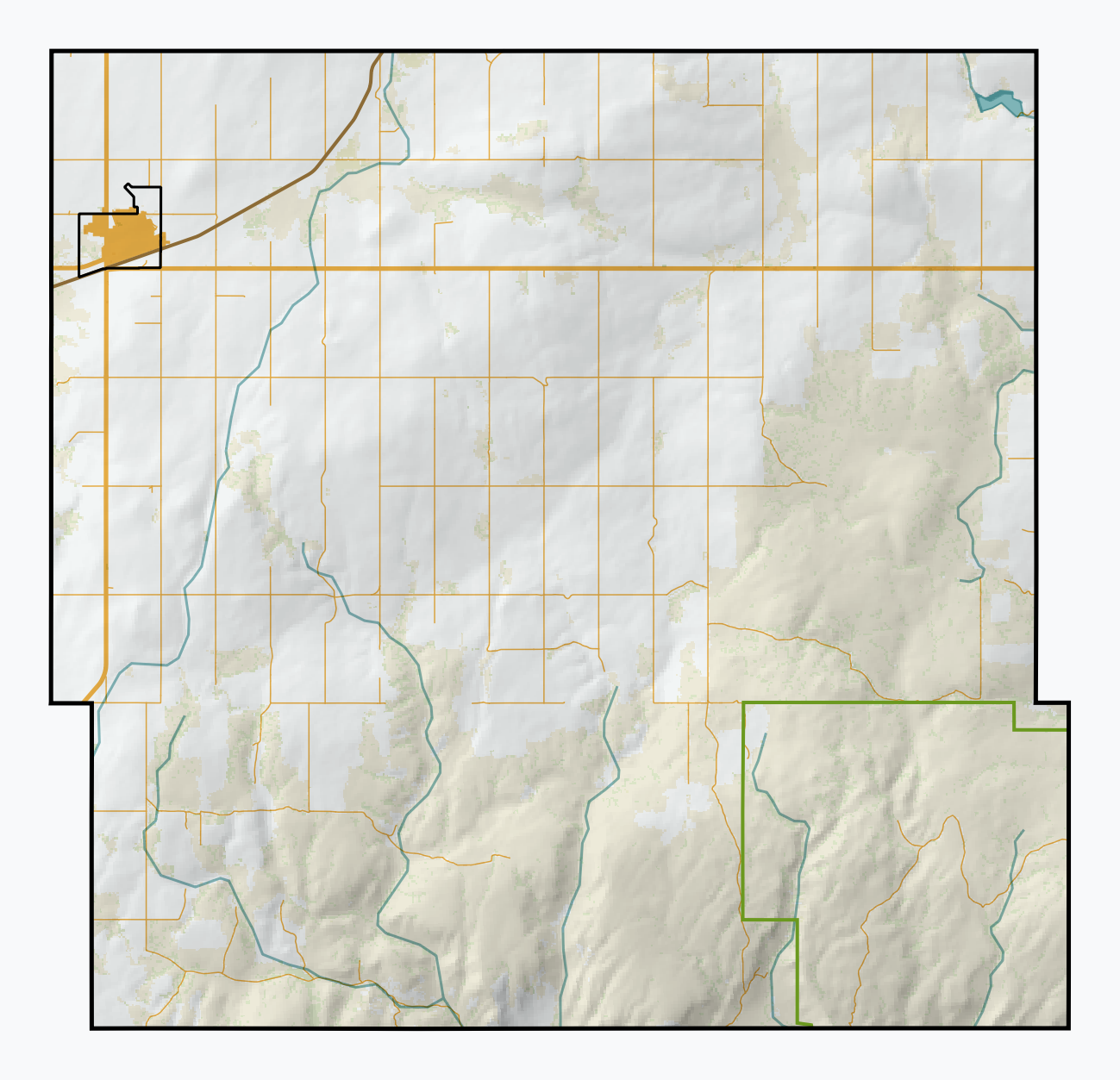

- Location of the RM of Grassy Creek No. 78 in Saskatchewan
- Coordinates: 49.604°N 108.279°W
- Country: Canada
- Province: Saskatchewan
- SARM division: 3
- Federal riding: Cypress Hills—Grasslands
- Provincial riding: Cypress Hills
- Formed: January 1, 1913

Government
  - Reeve: Michael Sutter
  - Governing body: RM of Grassy Creek No. 78 Council
  - Administrator: Kathy Collins
  - Office location: Shaunavon

Area (2016)
  - Land: 837.4 km^{2} (323.3 sq mi)

Population (2016)
  - Total: 364
  - Density: 0.4/km^{2} (1.0/sq mi)
- Time zone: CST
  - Summer (DST): CST
- Postal code: S0N 2M0
- Area codes: 306 and 639

The Rural Municipality of Grassy Creek No. 78 (2016 population: 364) is a rural municipality (RM) in the Canadian province of Saskatchewan within SARM Division No. 3.

== History ==
The RM of Grassy Creek No. 78 incorporated as a rural municipality on January 1, 1913.

== Demographics ==
Population history (1981–2016)
Year	Pop.	±%
1981	485	—
1986	466	−3.9%
1991	437	−6.2%
1996	416	−4.8%
2001	401	−3.6%
2006	305	−23.9%
2011	284	−6.9%
2016	364	+28.2%
Source: Statistics Canada via Saskatchewan Bureau of Statistics

In the 2021 Census of Population conducted by Statistics Canada, the RM of Grassy Creek No. 78 had a population of 341 living in 130 of its 139 total private dwellings, a change of −6.3% from its 2016 population of 364. With a land area of 831.45 km^{2} (321.02 sq mi), it had a population density of 0.4/km^{2} (1.1/sq mi) in 2021.

In the 2016 Census of Population, the RM of Grassy Creek No. 78 recorded a population of 364 living in 136 of its 148 total private dwellings, a 28.2% change from its 2011 population of 284. With a land area of 837.4 km^{2} (323.3 sq mi), it had a population density of 0.4/km^{2} (1.1/sq mi) in 2016.

== Government ==
The RM of Grassy Creek No. 78 is governed by an elected municipal council and an appointed administrator that meets on the third Wednesday of every month. The reeve of the RM is Michael Sutter while its administrator is Kathy Collins. The RM's office is located in Shaunavon. The RM shares this office with the RM of Wise Creek No. 77.

== Transportation ==
- Highway 13 – serves Ponteix, Saskatchewan

== See also ==
- List of communities in Saskatchewan
- List of rural municipalities in Saskatchewan
