= Old Wives Lake =

Salt lake in Saskatchewan, Canada

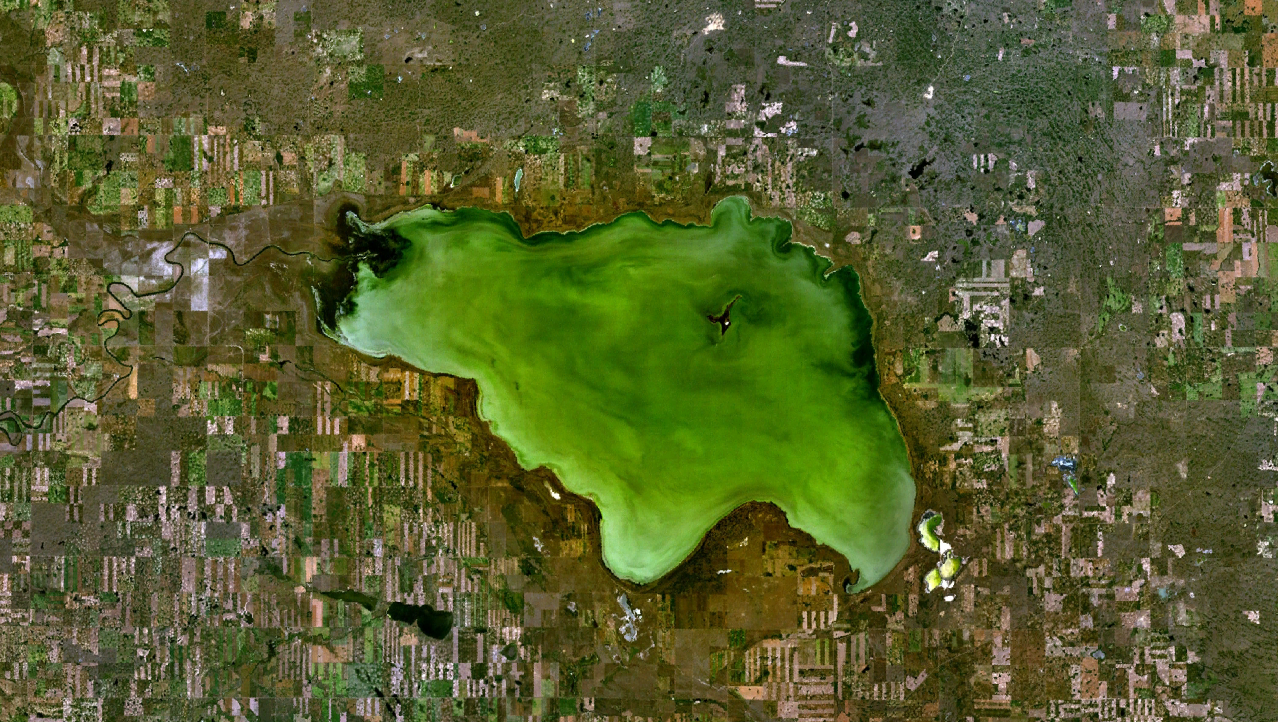
- Old Wives Lake, as seen from space.

- Location in Saskatchewan Old Wives Lake (Canada)
- Location: Saskatchewan
- Coordinates: 50°06′00″N 106°00′02″W
- Type: Endorheic, salt lake
- Primary inflows: Wood River
- Primary outflows: None
- Catchment area: 16,850 km^{2} (6,510 sq mi)
- Basin countries: Canada
- Surface elevation: 664 m (2,178 ft)
- Islands: Isle of Bays; Sand Bar Island

Old Wives Lake is a shallow endorheic salt lake in south central Saskatchewan, Canada, about 30 kilometres (19 mi) south-west of Moose Jaw. The lake is fed by the Wood River but seasonal water relatively flattened the terrain, and as such results in significant mudflats. A Migratory Bird Sanctuary was established at the lake on March 9, 1925. This lake, in conjunction with Reed Lake and Chaplin Lake, forms a site of hemispheric importance in the Western Hemisphere Shorebird Reserve Network. It was designated in April 1997, and is "one of the most important inland sites for migratory birds in North America". At the north-eastern part of the lake is the Isle of Bays Wildlife Refuge (50.1167°N 105.9172501°W). The wildlife refuge encompasses the entirety of Isle of Bays.

At various times during the lake's human history, it has attracted interest from several First Nations tribes, duck hunters, military trainers, sodium sulfate producers, conservationists, and birdwatchers.

Nearby communities include Old Wives and Mossbank. Access to the lake is from Highway 363. The Old Wives Lake is a popular destination for birdwatchers; a 2.4-kilometre (1.5 mi) walking trail has been constructed along the lake's south shore, along with viewing and picnic areas.

== Name ==
A variety of First Nations oral traditions explain the origin of the lake's name. According to a Cree tradition, recounted by Métis guides accompanying the North-West Mounted Police in 1874, sometime around 1840 a band of Cree hunters followed a herd of bison into Blackfoot territory and made camp near the lake. Blackfoot scouts discovered this band and attacked. Although the Cree defend themselves from this attack, they anticipated an attack by a larger group of Blackfoot the next morning. The older women volunteered to stay behind to tend the fires through the night in the hope of fooling the Blackfoot into believing they were not abandoning their camp to escape. Using this diversion as cover, the rest of the Cree fled back to their home territory in the Qu'Appelle valley. When the Blackfoot attackers arrived in the morning, they found only the old women, whom the Blackfoot killed in vengeance. This commonly recited version of the lake's naming has been commemorated by a historical marker situated beside Highway 2 near the lake.

A variant telling of this narrative states that the Blackfoot attackers were so impressed by the women's courage that they left them alone and allowed them to rejoin their own people.

Another First Nations oral tradition describes how a band of Assiniboine fleeing from pursuing Blackfoot pursuers abandoned the old women in their band because could not keep up with the others. The women continued their effort to escape by wading across the lake. However, they misjudged the water's depth and drowned.

An Assiniboine tradition associates the name with a battle that occurred at the lake around the beginning of the 19th century in which Assiniboines vanquished Blackfoot enemies.

According to some First Nations traditions, the spirits of the dead women continue to haunt a small island in the lake. Their voices can be heard sometimes at night.

Some early accounts describing the region state that the name "Old Wives Lake" was originally applied to both the lake that currently bears that name and to nearby Chaplin Lake.

In 1861, the British politicians Sir Frederick Johnstone and Henry Chaplin visited the area to hunt bison, antelope, and elk for sport. Explorer John Rae, who accompanied the expedition, named area lakes in honour of its members: The lake now called Old Wives Lake became Johnstone Lake and Chaplin Lake received the name by which it is still known. Although the Canadian government officially adopted the designation "Johnstone Lake" in 1886, the First Nations peoples along with early ranchers and homesteaders in the area continued to refer to it as Old Wives Lake. In response to a petition by area residents to restore its traditional name, the Canadian board on geographical names formally renamed it Old Wives Lake in 1953.

== History ==
Teepee rings and other artifacts discovered near Old Wives Lake attest to a First Nations presence in the area long predating their contact with Europeans. With the arrival of European settlers, ranchers and homesteaders occupied the area surrounding the lake. Until hunting was prohibited in the Old Wives Lake bird sanctuary, duck hunters gathered at the lake in the autumn to hunt the plentiful wild ducks and geese. During World War II a bombing and gunnery air training school established under the British Commonwealth Air Training Plan operated near the lake's shoreline, three miles east of Mossbank. Throughout the war, part of the lake and its surroundings were incorporated into a 23-mile bombing range used by trainee pilots. For some decades in the 20th century, especially during the 1950s and 1960s, sodium sulfate was harvested from the lake by diverting water into nearby Frederick Lake for evaporation. The sodium sulfate plant operated until 1977. In 1975, two Canadian Forces military training aircraft were involved in a mid-air collision over the lake which caused one of the aircraft to crash into it. The two pilots in this aircraft parachuted down and inflated emergency rubber dinghies enabling them to remain afloat until their rescue by a helicopter based out of CFB Moose Jaw.

Drought conditions caused the lake to dry up completely in 1937 and 1988. In certain years, including 1951, 1959, 1980 and 1997, large numbers of ducks were found dead at the lake due to outbreaks of botulism.

== Old Wives-Frederick Lakes IBA ==
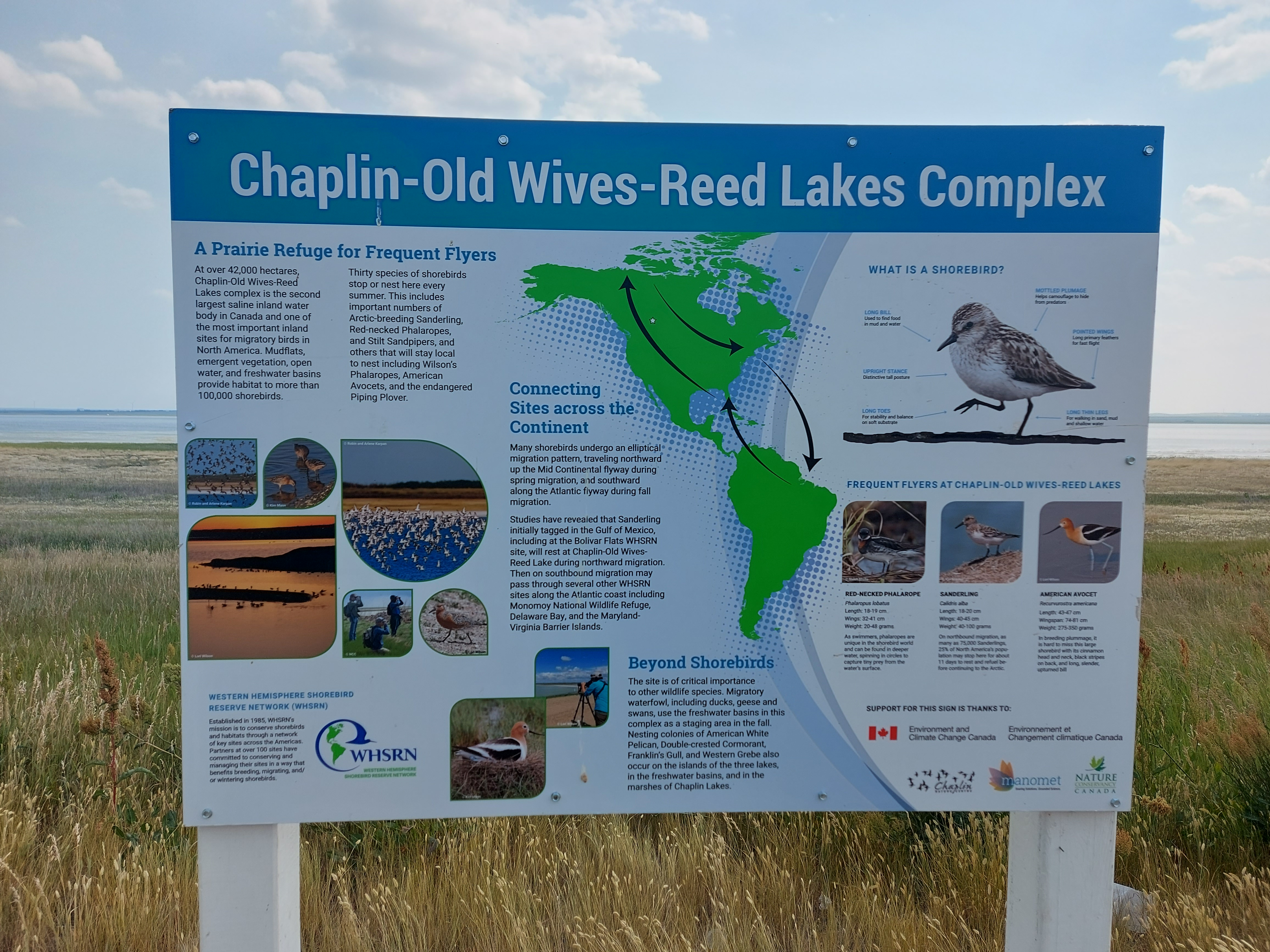
Chaplin - Old Wives - Reed Lakes WHSRN

The Old Wives-Frederick Lakes (SK 031) Important Bird Area (IBA) of Canada is a protected area for birds that encompasses Old Wives and Frederick Lakes. The total area covered by the IBA is 434.91 km^{2} (167.92 sq mi). Frederick Lake is a shallow basin adjacent to the south-western shore of Old Wives Lake. The site is home to numerous different bird species, including the endangered piping plover. The most commonly found birds include sanderlings and Baird's sandpipers. Other species include American white pelicans, Semipalmated sandpipers, stilt sandpipers, American avocets, double-crested cormorants, Franklin's gulls, ring-billed gulls, California gulls, common terns, mallards, and canvasbacks.

== See also ==
- List of lakes of Saskatchewan
- List of protected areas of Saskatchewan
