= Ponteix =

Town in Saskatchewan, Canada

- Town
- Town of Ponteix
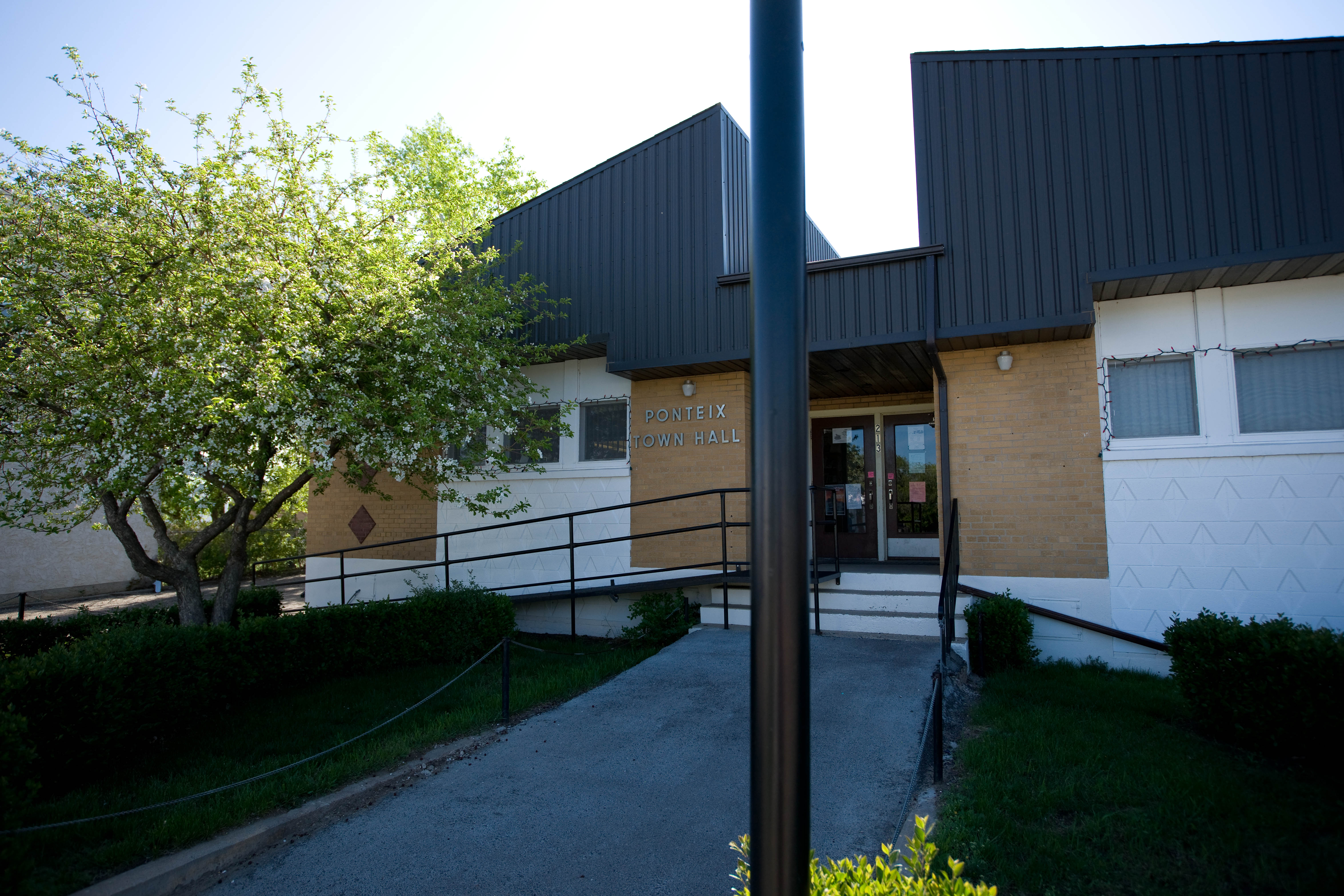
- Ponteix town hall

- Location within Auvergne No. 76 Location within Saskatchewan
- Coordinates: 49.7476°N 107.4883°W
- Country: Canada
- Province: Saskatchewan
- Rural Municipality: Auvergne No. 76
- Post office Founded: 1908-10-01

Government
  - Mayor: Kurt Dixon
  - Town Manager: Lynne Lemieux
  - Governing body: Ponteix Town Council
  - MLA: Dave Marit
  - MP: Jeremy Patzer

Area
  - Total: 1.09 km^{2} (0.42 sq mi)

Population (2021)
  - Total: 577
  - Density: 485.2/km^{2} (1,257/sq mi)
- Time zone: UTC−6 (Central Standard Time)
- Postal code: S0N 1Z0
- Area code: 306
- Highways: Highway 13 (Red Coat Trail / Ghost Town Trail) / Highway 628
- Waterways: Notukeu Creek
- Website: www.ponteix.ca

Ponteix (/ˈpɒntɛks/, PON-teks) is a town in southwestern Saskatchewan, Canada, 86 kilometres (53 mi) southeast of Swift Current. It is on Highway 628, just north of Highway 13.

== History ==
In 1908, Father Albert-Marie Royer from the Auvergne region in France established a parish and hamlet called Notre-Dame d’Auvergne north of Notukeu Creek. Five years later, the townsite was moved south of the creek when the Canadian Pacific Railway laid track there. After the move, the community was renamed Ponteix after Father Royer's former parish in France (Le Ponteix, commune of Aydat).

== Demographics ==
In the 2021 Census of Population conducted by Statistics Canada, Ponteix had a population of 577 living in 242 of its 276 total private dwellings, a change of 2.5% from its 2016 population of 563. With a land area of 1.19 km^{2} (0.46 sq mi), it had a population density of 484.9/km^{2} (1,255.8/sq mi) in 2021.

== Climate ==
Climate data for Ponteix, Saskatchewan
Month	Jan	Feb	Mar	Apr	May	Jun	Jul	Aug	Sep	Oct	Nov	Dec	Year
Record high °C (°F)	10.6 (51.1)	5.8 (42.4)	13.9 (57.0)	21.4 (70.5)	29.6 (85.3)	32.8 (91.0)	34.5 (94.1)	34.1 (93.4)	32.0 (89.6)	23.6 (74.5)	15.0 (59.0)	9.1 (48.4)	34.5 (94.1)
Mean daily maximum °C (°F)	−9.6 (14.7)	−11.6 (11.1)	−5.8 (21.6)	3.7 (38.7)	11.2 (52.2)	17.4 (63.3)	21.0 (69.8)	20.2 (68.4)	13.1 (55.6)	5.1 (41.2)	−6.0 (21.2)	−9.5 (14.9)	4.3 (39.7)
Daily mean °C (°F)	−14.4 (6.1)	−16.8 (1.8)	−10.6 (12.9)	−2.0 (28.4)	5.3 (41.5)	11.1 (52.0)	14.1 (57.4)	13.1 (55.6)	6.8 (44.2)	0.1 (32.2)	−10.0 (14.0)	−13.8 (7.2)	−2.1 (28.2)
Mean daily minimum °C (°F)	−19.1 (−2.4)	−22.0 (−7.6)	−15.4 (4.3)	−8.0 (17.6)	0.5 (32.9)	4.7 (40.5)	7.1 (44.8)	5.9 (42.6)	0.6 (33.1)	−4.9 (23.2)	−14.8 (5.4)	−18.1 (−0.6)	−6.4 (20.5)
Record low °C (°F)	−39.0 (−38.2)	−43.5 (−46.3)	−34.4 (−29.9)	−27.5 (−17.5)	−15.0 (5.0)	−6.4 (20.5)	−2.5 (27.5)	−3.5 (25.7)	−11.5 (11.3)	−26.5 (−15.7)	−35.5 (−31.9)	−39.5 (−39.1)	−43.5 (−46.3)
Average precipitation mm (inches)	16 (0.6)	9 (0.4)	15 (0.6)	23 (0.9)	55 (2.2)	70 (2.8)	61 (2.4)	47 (1.9)	27 (1.1)	18 (0.7)	15 (0.6)	17 (0.7)	363 (14.3)
Average snowfall cm (inches)	16 (6.3)	14 (5.4)	12 (4.7)	4.8 (1.9)	0.76 (0.3)	0.0 (0.0)	0.0 (0.0)	0.0 (0.0)	0.25 (0.1)	3.6 (1.4)	7.9 (3.1)	14 (5.5)	73 (28.7)
Average precipitation days	6.9	5.1	6.3	5.9	8.4	8.4	7.4	6.3	5.8	5.6	6.7	6.8	80.6
Average snowy days	9.2	7.5	6.4	2.7	0.4	0.0	0.0	0.0	0.2	2.4	6.6	9.4	45.8
Average relative humidity (%)	77	70	62	55	51	54	55	57	59	63	71	77	63
Mean monthly sunshine hours	95.0	118.0	177.0	224.0	285.0	330.0	348.0	313.0	243.0	166.0	91.0	71.0	2,451

According to the 2011 federal census, 175 of Ponteix's residents spoke both official languages (English and French).

Canada census – Ponteix community profile

	2021	2011
Population	577 (+2.5% from 2016)	605 (+13.9% from 2006)
Land area	1.19 km^{2} (0.46 sq mi)	1.09 km^{2} (0.42 sq mi)
Population density	485.2/km^{2} (1,257/sq mi)	556.0/km^{2} (1,440/sq mi)
Median age	46 (M: 43.6, F: 48.8)	51.6 (M: 47.0, F: 55.8)
Private dwellings	245 (total)	268 (total)
Median household income

References: 2021 2011

== Notukeu Regional Park ==
Notukeu Regional Park (49.7501°N 107.4854°W) is a regional park along the banks of Notukeu Creek and adjacent to Ponteix. The park has a campground, golf course, spray park, and swimming pool. It is a small park that was founded in 1964.

The campground has 30 serviced campsites plus a tenting area. The Ponteix Golf Club has grass greens and is a 9-hole, par 33 course that totals 2,485 yards. There is a licensed clubhouse and pro shop.

== Attractions ==
- Plesiosaur Statue: Near Ponteix was the site of a plesiosaur find in the early 1990s. In 1995 community members and students of Ponteix school contributed small articles to this plesiosaur statue before it was filled with cement and painted by the townspeople in a ceremony commemorating the discovery of the original plesiosaur's bones.
- Notukeu Heritage Museum in Ponteix features prehistoric artifacts.
- Notre Dame D'Auvergne Catholic Church, a brick and concrete structure in Ponteix built in 1929, features twin steeples and houses a large wood carving of the Pieta. The Pieta statue came to Canada in 1909 and was saved when the 1916 church was destroyed by fire in 1923. A description of the oak statue in 1954 by Abbot Jerome Webber of St. Peter's Abbey claims it was made in France over four hundred years ago, was saved by peasants during the French Revolution and was once covered in pure gold.

== Notable residents ==
- Mark Lamb — former NHL ice hockey player

== See also ==
- List of communities in Saskatchewan
- List of francophone communities in Saskatchewan
- List of towns in Saskatchewan
