= Rural Municipality of Wise Creek No. 77 =

Rural municipality in Saskatchewan, Canada

Wise Creek No. 77
- Rural municipality
- Rural Municipality of Wise Creek No. 77
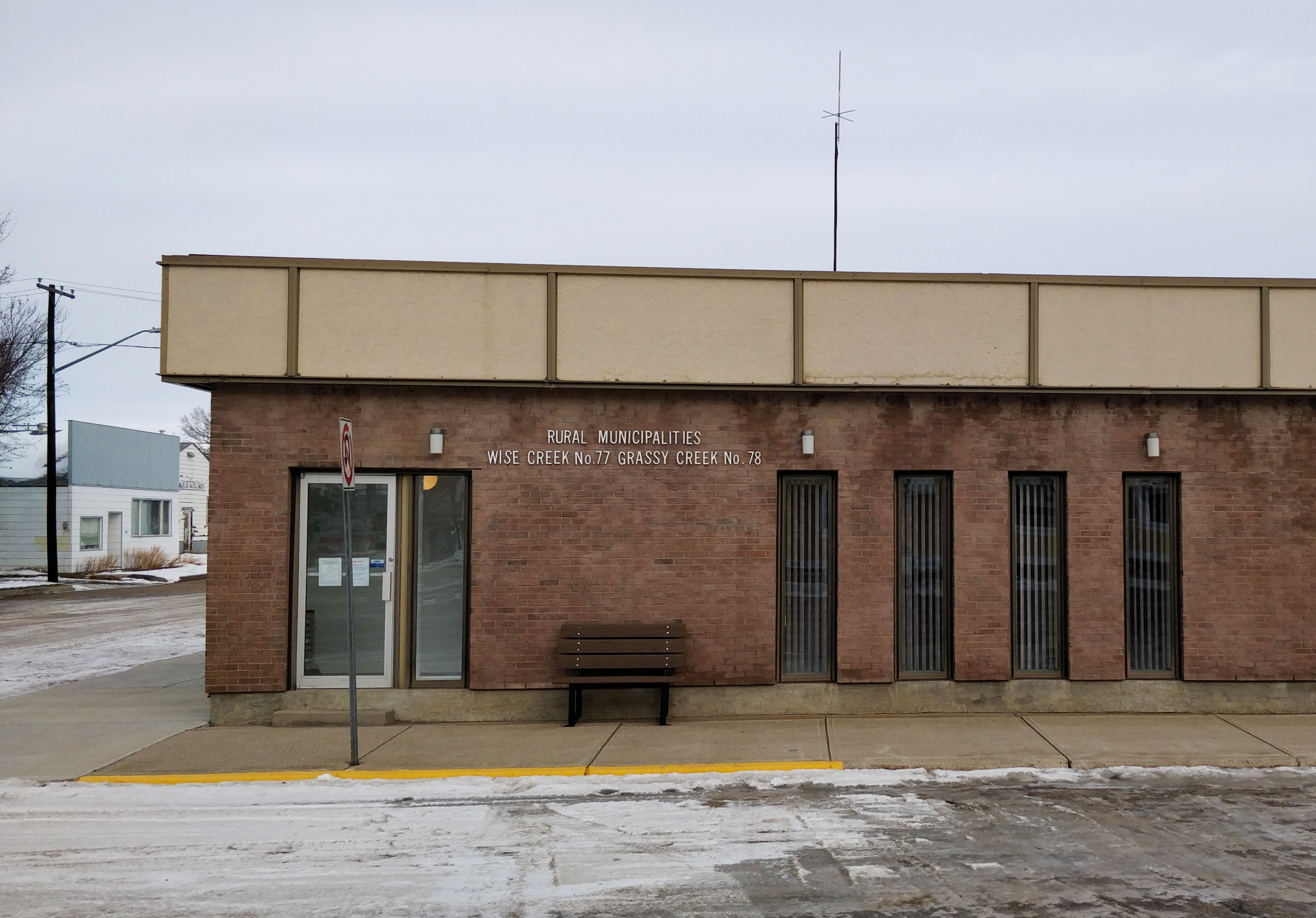
- Administrative office in Shaunavon

- Location of the RM of Wise Creek No. 77 in Saskatchewan
- Coordinates: 49.658°N 107.810°W
- Country: Canada
- Province: Saskatchewan
- Census division: 4
- SARM division: 3
- Federal riding: Cypress Hills—Grasslands
- Provincial riding: Wood River
- Formed: January 1, 1913

Government
  - Reeve: Denis Chenard
  - Governing body: RM of Wise Creek No. 77 Council
  - Administrator: Kathy Collins
  - Office location: Shaunavon

Area (2016)
  - Land: 845.81 km^{2} (326.57 sq mi)

Population (2016)
  - Total: 205
  - Density: 0.2/km^{2} (0.52/sq mi)
- Time zone: CST
  - Summer (DST): CST
- Postal code: S0N 2M0
- Area codes: 306 and 639
- Website: Official website

The Rural Municipality of Wise Creek No. 77 (2016 population: 205) is a rural municipality (RM) in the Canadian province of Saskatchewan within Census Division No. 4 and SARM Division No. 3. It is located in the southwest portion of the province near Admiral.

== History ==
The RM of Wise Creek No. 77 incorporated as a rural municipality on January 1, 1913.

== Geography ==
=== Communities and localities ===
The following urban municipalities are surrounded by the RM.

Villages

- Cadillac

The following unincorporated communities are within the RM.

Localities

- Admiral, dissolved from village status on August 17, 2006
- Crichton
- Driscol Lake
- Frenchville

== Demographics ==
Population history (1981–2016)
Year	Pop.	±%
1981	371	—
1986	346	−6.7%
1991	315	−9.0%
1996	297	−5.7%
2001	257	−13.5%
2006	222	−13.6%
2011	157	−29.3%
2016	205	+30.6%
Source: Statistics Canada via Saskatchewan Bureau of Statistics

In the 2021 Census of Population conducted by Statistics Canada, the RM of Wise Creek No. 77 had a population of 188 living in 83 of its 133 total private dwellings, a change of −8.3% from its 2016 population of 205. With a land area of 822.49 km^{2} (317.57 sq mi), it had a population density of 0.2/km^{2} (0.6/sq mi) in 2021.

In the 2016 Census of Population, the RM of Wise Creek No. 77 recorded a population of 205 living in 85 of its 97 total private dwellings, a 30.6% change from its 2011 population of 157. With a land area of 845.81 km^{2} (326.57 sq mi), it had a population density of 0.2/km^{2} (0.6/sq mi) in 2016.

== Government ==
The RM of Wise Creek No. 77 is governed by an elected municipal council and an appointed administrator that meets on the second Wednesday of every month. The reeve of the RM is Denis Chenard while its administrator is Kathy Collins. The RM's office is located in Shaunavon. The RM shares this office with the RM of Grassy Creek.

== Transportation ==
- Highway 13—serves Shaunavon
- Highway 37—serves Shaunavon
- Highway 722—serves Shaunavon

== See also ==
- List of rural municipalities in Saskatchewan
