= Western Hemisphere Shorebird Reserve Network =

Shorebird conservation network across the Americas

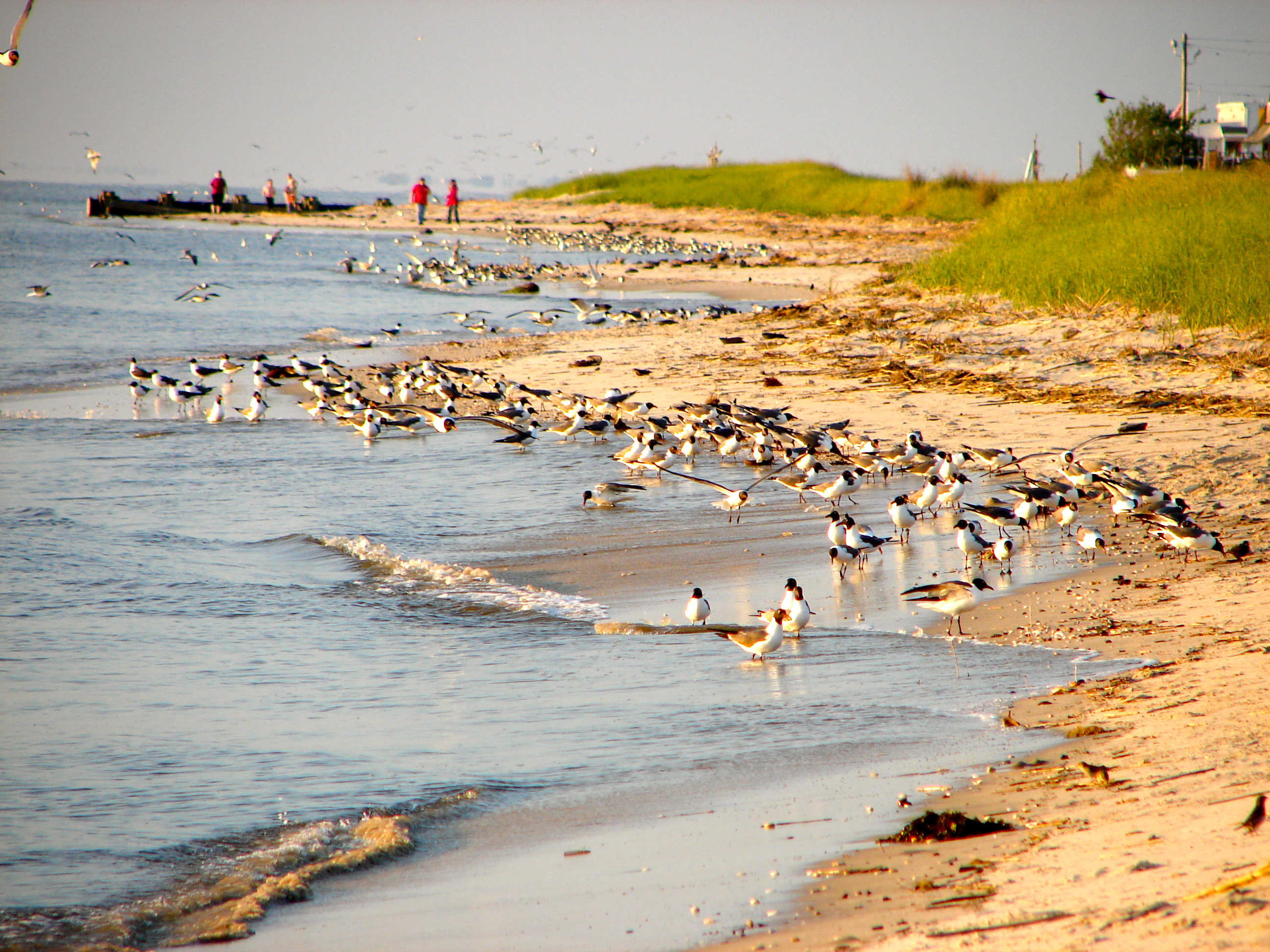
Delaware Bay shoreline at Villas, on Cape May showing sand, dunes, and Laughing Gulls

The Western Hemisphere Shorebird Reserve Network (WHSRN) is a conservation strategy targeting shorebirds in the Americas launched in 1985. Its aim is to protect the nesting, breeding and staging habitats of migratory shorebirds. The first site to be classified was Delaware Bay, which was dedicated in May 1986 as a site of Hemispheric Importance.

Sites in the Western Hemisphere Shorebird Reserve Network may also be classified as Important Bird Areas, Ramsar wetlands of international importance, or both.

There are three possible classifications for sites in the network. Landscapes are always classified as being of Hemispheric Importance.

Hemispheric Importance
sites that act as staging, nesting or breeding grounds for at least 500,000 shorebirds annually, or at least 30% of the biogeographic population of any species.

International Importance
sites that act as staging, nesting or breeding grounds for at least 100,000 shorebirds annually, or at least 10% of the biogeographic population of any species

Regional Importance
sites that act as staging, nesting or breeding grounds for at least 20,000 shorebirds annually, or at least 1% of the biogeographic population of any species
