= Wood Mountain =

Wood Mountain may refer to:

- Wood Mountain, Saskatchewan, a village Saskatchewan, Canada
- Wood Mountain (electoral district), a Canadian federal electoral district in Saskatchewan
- Wood Mountain Regional Park, a regional park in Saskatchewan
- Wood Mountain Lakota First Nation, a First Nations in Saskatchewan
  - Wood Mountain 160, an Indian reserve
- Wood Mountain Post Provincial Park, a provincial park in Saskatchewan
- Wood Mountain Hills, a plateau in Saskatchewan
- Wood Mountain Formation, a geological formation in Saskatchewan
- Wood Mountain (Colorado), a mountain in Colorado, U.S.

== See also ==
- Woods Mountains, California
- Mount Wood (disambiguation)
