= Makwa =

Makwa may refer to:

== Geography ==
Nauru

- Former name of Yaren

Nigeria

- Makwa, Nigeria (also spelled Makwia), a town in Sokoto State

Saskatchewan, Canada

- Makwa, Saskatchewan, a village
- Makwa Lake, a lake
- Makwa River, a river
- Makwa Sahgaiehcan First Nation
- Makwa Lake Provincial Park, a park

== Science and technology ==
- Makwa (cryptography), a cryptographic algorithm used as a key derivation function
