= Makwa, Saskatchewan =

Makwa
- Village
- Location of Makwa in Saskatchewan Makwa (Canada)
- Coordinates: 53.991°N 108.889°W
- Country: Canada
- Province: Saskatchewan
- Region: Saskatchewan
- Census division: 17
- Rural Municipality: Loon Lake
- Post office Founded: N/A
- Incorporated (Village): N/A
- Incorporated (Town): N/A

Government
  - Mayor: Maurice Jeannotte
  - Administrator: Raylene Barthel
  - Governing body: Makwa Village Council

Area
  - Total: 0.66 km^{2} (0.25 sq mi)

Population (2006)
  - Total: 96
  - Density: 153.3/km^{2} (397/sq mi)
- Time zone: CST
- Postal code: S0M 1N0
- Area code: 306
- Highways: Highway 304
- Waterways: Makwa River; Makwa Lake
- Indian reserves: Indian Reserves
- Provincial Parks: Makwa Lake Provincial Park; Meadow Lake Provincial Park; Steele Narrows Provincial Park

Makwa (2016 population: 84) is a village in the Canadian province of Saskatchewan within the Rural Municipality of Loon Lake No. 561 and Census Division No. 17.

== History ==
Makwa incorporated as a village on June 1, 1965.

== Demographics ==
Population history (1981–2016)
| Year | Pop. | ±% |
|---|---|---|
| 1981 | 115 | — |
| 1986 | 129 | +12.2% |
| 1991 | 113 | −12.4% |
| 1996 | 104 | −8.0% |
| 2001 | 101 | −2.9% |
| 2006 | 96 | −5.0% |
| 2011 | 97 | +1.0% |
| 2016 | 84 | −13.4% |
Source: Statistics Canada via Saskatchewan Bureau of Statistics

In the 2021 Census of Population conducted by Statistics Canada, Makwa had a population of 78 living in 41 of its 47 total private dwellings, a change of −7.1% from its 2016 population of 84. With a land area of 0.58 km^{2} (0.22 sq mi), it had a population density of 134.5/km^{2} (348.3/sq mi) in 2021.

In the 2016 Census of Population, the Village of Makwa recorded a population of 84 living in 42 of its 43 total private dwellings, a −15.5% change from its 2011 population of 97. With a land area of 0.66 km^{2} (0.25 sq mi), it had a population density of 127.3/km^{2} (329.6/sq mi) in 2016.

== See also ==
- List of communities in Saskatchewan
- List of francophone communities in Saskatchewan
- List of villages in Saskatchewan
