= Manitoba Liberal Party candidates in the 1969 Manitoba provincial election =

The Manitoba Liberal Party fielded several candidates in the 1969 provincial election, and elected five candidates to emerge as the third-largest party in the legislature. Many of the party's candidates have their own biography pages; information on others may be found here.

== Point Douglas: Roger Garrity ==
Garrity received 528 votes (12.31%), finishing third against New Democratic Party incumbent Donald Malinowski.

In 2005, a Winnipeg resident named Roger Garrity criticized a Supreme Court of Canada decision that allowed for the possibility of private health care delivery. Garrity argued that private delivery would operate at the expense of the public system, and would not address the fundamental shortage of doctors and nurses. It is possible that this is the same person.

== St. Vital: Joe Stangl ==
Joseph Stangl was born near Quantock, Saskatchewan in 1919, and has been a prominent member of Winnipeg's Roman Catholic community for many years. He worked as a salesman and manager for Crane Ltd. and Anthes Western Ltd. until 1969, when he retired to become a full-time community worker.

Stangl was a member of the Saskatoon Separate School Board during his time in Saskatchewan. He was later the secretary-treasurer of St. Paul's High School in Winnipeg for fifteen years. In 1979, he was made a member of the Order of Canada. An active member of the Knights of Columbus, he is a recipient of the Knighthood of St. Gregory (1958) and the Catholic Foundation of Manitoba's Caritas Award (1995). He criticized the church hierarchy's decision to dissolve Manitoba Interdiocesan Catholic Schools in 1999, arguing that the organization had been useful, and that the decision to dissolve it was "totally arbitrary". He celebrated his 90th birthday in 2009.

Stangl received 2,034 votes (28.31%) in 1969, finishing third against Progressive Conservative candidate Jack Hardy.
