= Saskatchewan Highway 358 =

Provincial highway in Saskatchewan, Canada

Highway 358

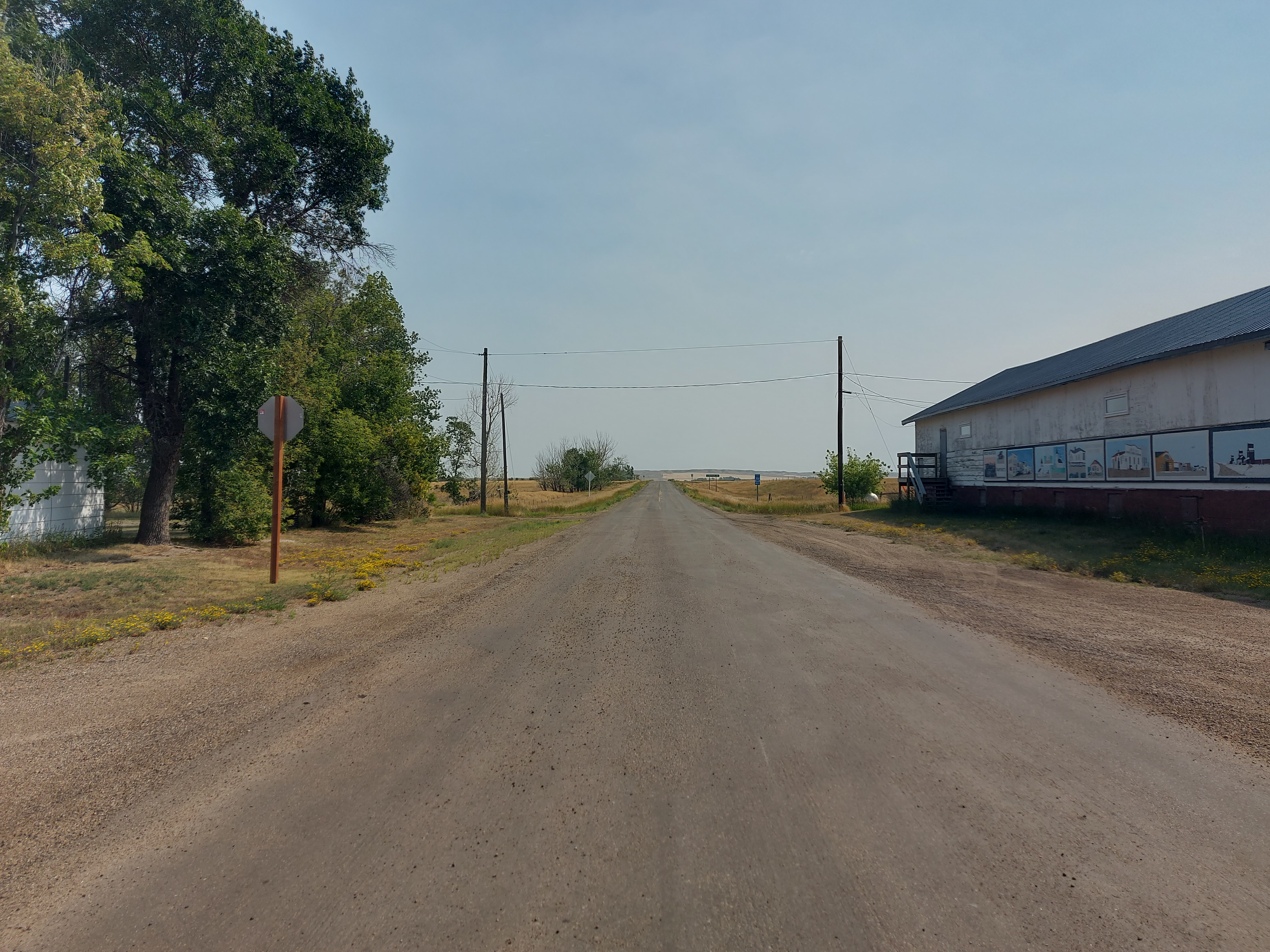
- Highway 358 at Wood Mountain

Route information
- Maintained by Ministry of Highways and Infrastructure
- Length: 42.5 km (26.4 mi)

Major junctions
- South end: Highway 18 near Wood Mountain
- North end: Highway 13 near Limerick

Location
- Country: Canada
- Province: Saskatchewan
- Rural municipalities: Old Post, Stonehenge

Highway system
- Provincial highways in Saskatchewan
← Highway 357	→ Highway 361

Highway 358 is a provincial highway in the Canadian province of Saskatchewan. It runs from Highway 18 near Wood Mountain to Highway 13 (Red Coat Trail / Ghost Town Trail) near Limerick. It is about 42.5 kilometres (26.4 mi) long.

The highway passes through the communities of Flintoft and Lakenheath. It skirts the western shore of Twelve Mile Lake about halfway between its southern and northern terminuses.

== Route description ==
Hwy 358 begins in the Rural Municipality of Old Post No. 43 at an intersection with Hwy 18 just immediately to the south of the village of Wood Mountain, with the road continuing south as eastbound Hwy 18. It immediately enters the village, making a sharp right as it travels eastward through town along First Avenue before leaving the village and making a sudden left turn at an intersection with Hwy 705. Winding its way northward through hilly terrain, the highway curves around the western coastline of Twelve Mile Lake as it passes through the hamlet of Flintoft, where it crosses a couple of small creeks, Wood Mountain Creek and Lynthorpe Creek, and a former railway line to enter the Rural Municipality of Stonehenge No. 73. After heading northeast for a few kilometres, Hwy 358 curves due northward at the Y-intersection with Hwy 719 (Stonehenge Grid / Range Road 3030, provides access to the locality of Stonehenge) at the locality of Lakenheath, travelling through rural farmland for several more kilometres to travel along the western edge of the village of Limerick, where it crosses the Great Western Railway before coming to an end at a junction with Hwy 13 (Red Coat Trail / Ghost Town Trail). The entire length of Hwy 358 is a paved, two-lane highway.

== Major intersections ==
From south to north:

Rural municipality	Location	km	mi	Destinations	Notes
Old Post No. 43	Wood Mountain	0.0	0.0	Highway 18 to Highway 2 – Glentworth, Grasslands National Park	Southern terminus; road continues south as eastbound Hwy 18
Old Post No. 43		5.7	3.5	Highway 705 east – Scout Lake	Western terminus of Hwy 705
Stonehenge No. 73	Lakenheath	28.8– 29.7	17.9– 18.5	Highway 719 east (Stonehenge Grid / Range Road 3030) – Stonhenge	Western terminus of Hwy 719
Stonehenge No. 73	Limerick	42.5	26.4	Highway 13 (Red Coat Trail / Ghost Town Trail) – Lafleche, Assiniboia	Northern terminus; road continues north as Range Road 3030
1.000 mi = 1.609 km; 1.000 km = 0.621 mi

== See also ==
- Transportation in Saskatchewan
- Roads in Saskatchewan
