= Wood Mountain, Saskatchewan =

Community in Saskatchewan, Canada

Wood Mountain
- Village
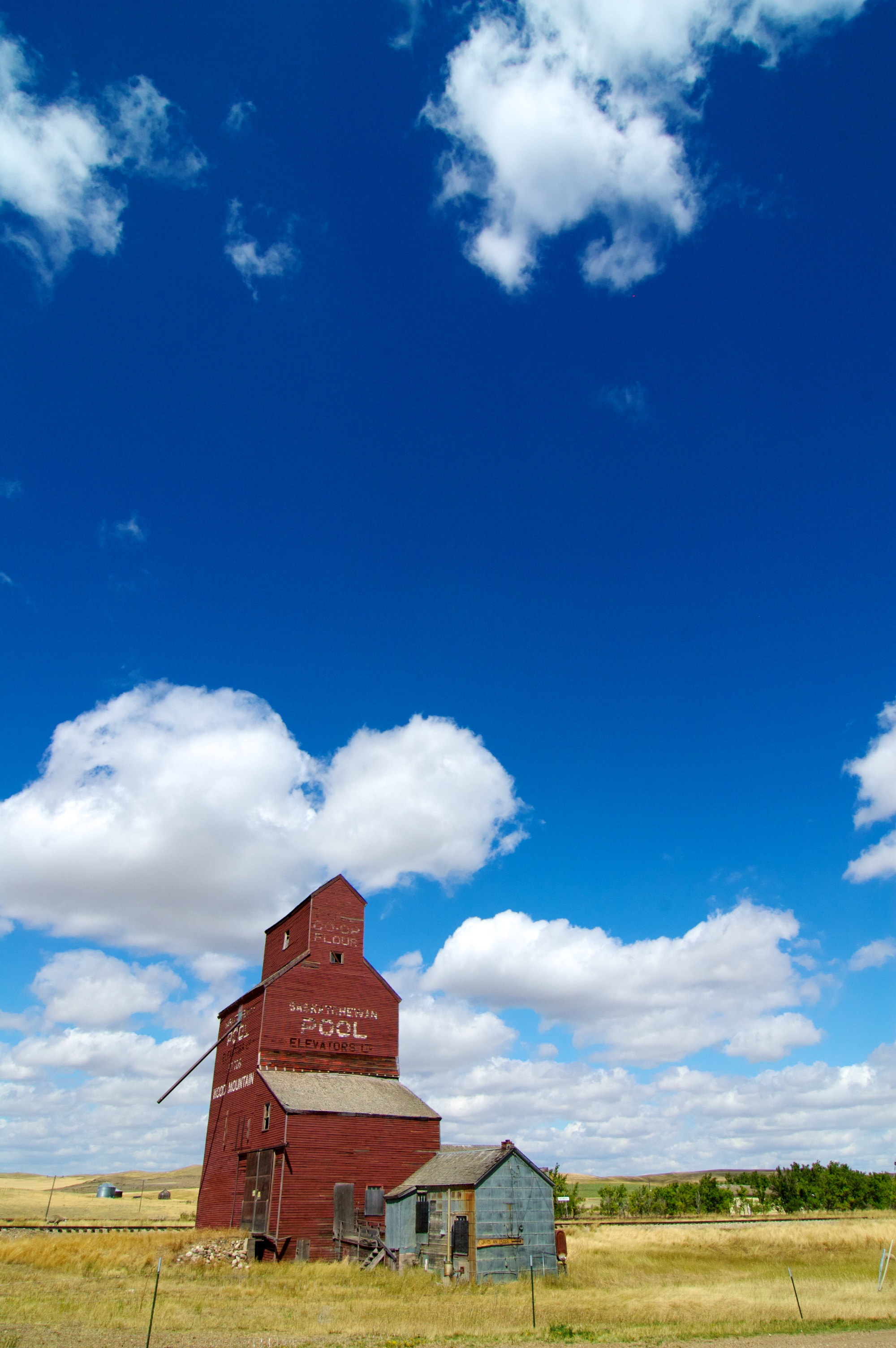
- Saskatchewan Wheat Pool elevator

- Location within Old Post No. 43 Location within Saskatchewan
- Coordinates: 49°22′15″N 106°23′01″W
- Country: Canada
- Province: Saskatchewan
- Region: South-central
- Rural Municipality: Old Post
- Incorporated (village): 1930

Government
  - Governing body: Wood Mountain Village Council
  - Mayor: Edward McIvor
  - Clerk: Vicki Greffard
  - MLA: Dave Marit
  - MP: Jeremy Patzer

Area
  - Total: 0.61 km^{2} (0.24 sq mi)

Population (2006)
  - Total: 20
  - Density: 32.6/km^{2} (84/sq mi)
- Time zone: CST
- Postal code: S0H 4L0
- Area code: 306
- Highways: Highway 18 / Highway 358
- Railways: Canadian Pacific Railway (Defunct)
- Website: Village of Wood Mountain

Wood Mountain (2016 population: 20) is a village in the Canadian province of Saskatchewan within the Rural Municipality of Old Post No. 43 and Census Division No. 3. Its name is derived from the Red River Métis words "montagne de bois" (meaning mountain of wood in French), due to the abundance of poplar trees in the otherwise barren region. Highway 18 and Highway 358 intersect south of the community.

Wood Mountain is known for its annual stampede that has been held every year for more than 124 years.

This village is northeast of the First Nations administrative office for the band government of the Wood Mountain Lakota First Nation.

== History ==
Wood Mountain was the terminus of the Fort Ellice–Wood Mountain Trail that was used from 1757 to the 1850s to haul provisions such as pemmican by the Métis and First Nations. The trail was over 400 kilometres (250 mi) long. It incorporated as a village on March 4, 1930.

== Demographics ==
Population history (1981–2016)
Year	Pop.	±%
1981	41	—
1986	36	−12.2%
1991	46	+27.8%
1996	31	−32.6%
2001	40	+29.0%
2006	20	−50.0%
2011	25	+25.0%
2016	20	−20.0%
Source: Statistics Canada via Saskatchewan Bureau of Statistics

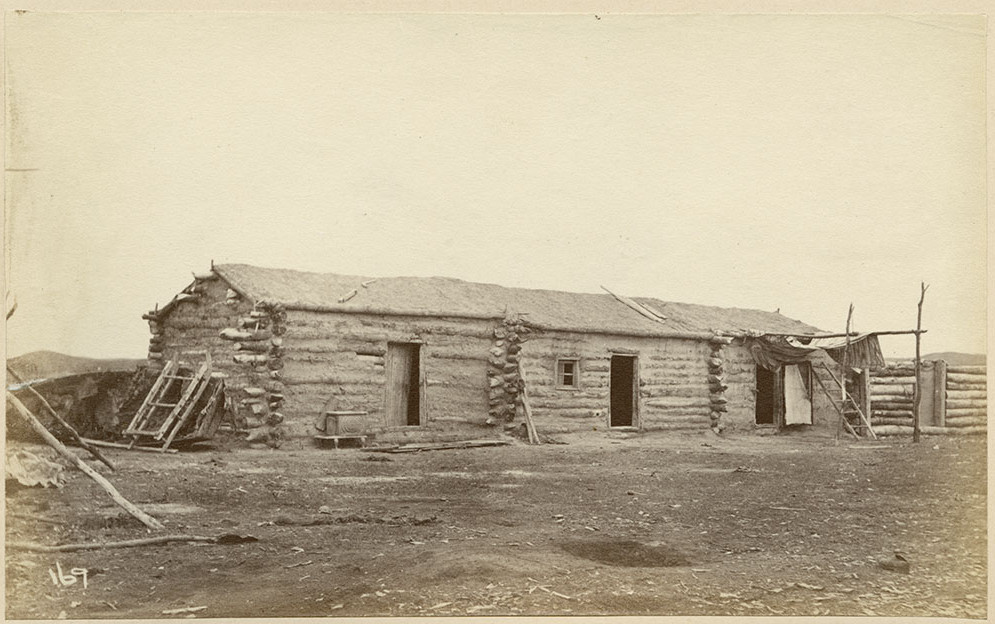
Building at the Wood Mountain Métis settlement in 1874

In the 2021 Census of Population conducted by Statistics Canada, Wood Mountain had a population of 20 living in 8 of its 14 total private dwellings, a change of 0% from its 2016 population of 20. With a land area of 0.61 km^{2} (0.24 sq mi), it had a population density of 32.8/km^{2} (84.9/sq mi) in 2021.

In the 2016 Census of Population, the Village of Wood Mountain recorded a population of 20 living in 9 of its 10 total private dwellings, a −25% change from its 2011 population of 25. With a land area of 0.61 km^{2} (0.24 sq mi), it had a population density of 32.8/km^{2} (84.9/sq mi) in 2016.

== Economy and tourism ==
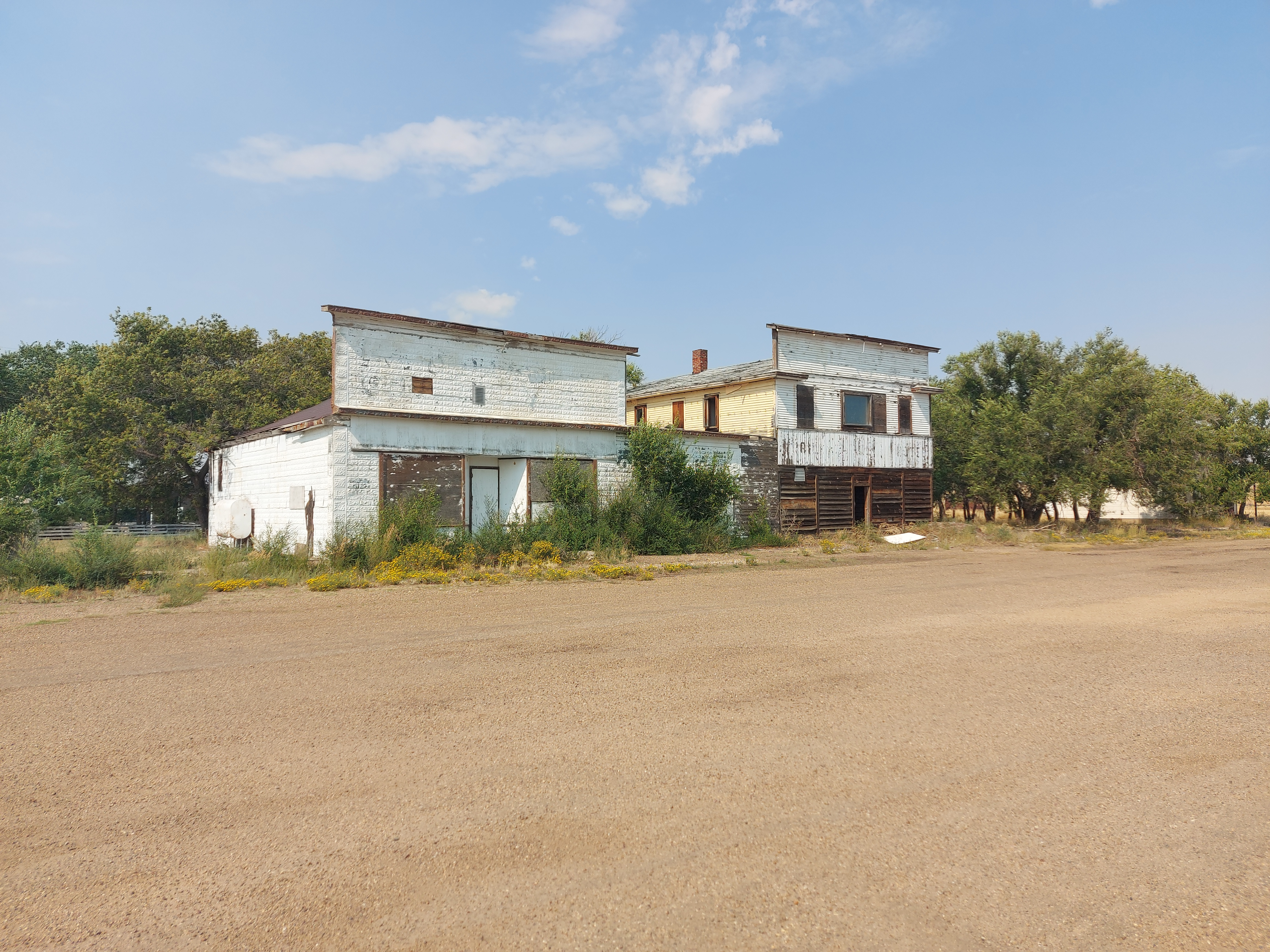
Abandoned buildings in Wood Mountain

Historically, Wood Mountain's economy has relied mainly on the agriculture industry. The community still has strong roots to farming and ranching, but with its location and rich history, tourism has become a main industry. The region has accommodations, such as hotels and bed and breakfasts, a cafe restaurant, outdoor pool, library, community hall, churches, museums, campgrounds, and parks.

=== Local attractions ===
- Wood Mountain Regional Park
- Wood Mountain Rodeo & Ranching Museum (located at Wood Mountain Regional Park)
- Wood Mountain Community Pool
- Wood Mountain Post Historic Park

=== Events ===
- Wood Mountain Stampede, oldest continuous annual Rodeo in Canada. It is located at Wood Mountain Regional Park and has run since 1890.
- Wood Mountain Farmers Market

=== Regional attractions ===
- Wood Mountain Hills
- Grasslands National Park
- St. Victor Petroglyphs Provincial Historic Park
- Thomson Lake Regional Park

== Notable residents ==
- Andrew Suknaski, poet
- Kacy & Clayton, folk-rock group

== See also ==
- List of communities in Saskatchewan
