= Wood Mountain Regional Park =

Regional park in Saskatchewan, Canada

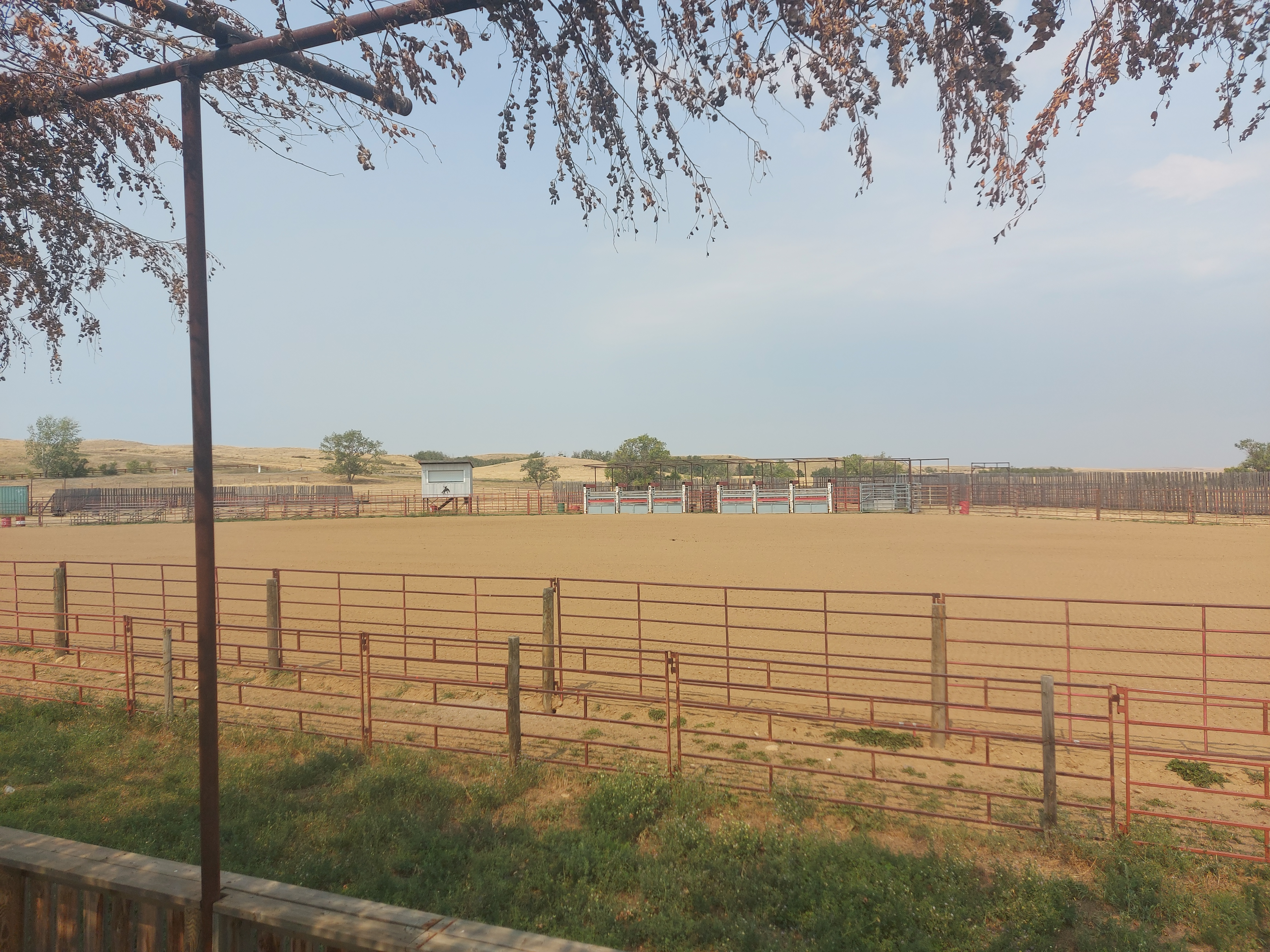
- Rodeo grounds at Wood Mountain Regional Park

- Location within Saskatchewan Location within Canada
- Location: RM of Old Post No. 43, Saskatchewan
- Nearest city: Wood Mountain
- Coordinates: 49.3202°N 106.3825°W
- Governing body: Saskatchewan Regional Parks Association

Wood Mountain Regional Park is a conservation and recreation area in its natural state set aside as a regional park in the south-western region of the Canadian province of Saskatchewan. The park is set in the semi-arid Palliser's Triangle in an upland area called Wood Mountain Hills. It is in the Rural Municipality of Old Post No. 43, 8 kilometres (5.0 mi) south of the village of Wood Mountain along Highway 18.

Adjacent to the southern boundary of Wood Mountain Regional Park is Wood Mountain Creek and Wood Mountain Post Provincial Park. Immediately to the west is Wood Mountain Indian reserve and to the east is the Wood Mountain Game Preserve (49.3001°N 106.2839°W).

Amenities and attractions within the park include the Rodeo Ranch Museum, Wood Mountain Stampede, Sitting Bull Monument, ball diamonds, campsites, concessions, swimming pool, and hiking and bicycling trails. This is a local park administered by local funding.

== History ==
In 1874, the Boundary Commission, which was charged with surveying the Canada–United States border, set up a depot on Wood Mountain Creek at the current location of Wood Mountain Regional Park. Later that year, the North-West Mounted Police (NWMP) on their March West to deal with the Cypress Hills Massacre, bought the depot and used it to establish relations with local First Nations, patrol the border with the United States, and to police whisky traders, horse thieves, and cattle rustlers.

In 1876, Chief Sitting Bull led his 5,000-strong Lakota Sioux tribe away from the Little Bighorn River into the Wood Mountain Hills in Canada after defeating Custer at the Battle of the Little Bighorn. The Canadian government was concerned that the Sioux would cause problems, and charged James Walsh of the NWMP with maintaining control of what amounted to Canada's first attempted peace keeping mission. Walsh succeeded, as he and Sitting Bull became close friends over the years. In the neighbouring provincial park, there are two reconstructed buildings with artefacts that tell the story of Walsh and Sitting Bull. Chief Sitting Bull and some of his people returned to the United States after five years while most stayed in the Wood Mountain area. In 1910, they were given their own Indian reserve and many of their descendants remain in the area to this day.

The North-West Mounted Police closed Wood Mountain Post in 1883. Then, with the out-break of the North-West Rebellion, it was re-opened in 1885. Two years later, the dilapidated buildings were abandoned and new buildings were constructed 300 metres (980 ft) to the south-east, across Wood Mountain Creek (which is a tributary of Wood River via Lynthorpe Creek) and in the current Wood Mountain Post Provincial Park. The post operated at that location until it was permanently closed in 1918.

== Attractions and amenities ==
Wood Mountain Regional Park is set in rolling hills and ranchland. There are several trails throughout the park, including one that leads to the provincial park. There is a heated swimming pool, a campground, museum, Bible camp, and Canada's longest running rodeo. A monument to Chief Sitting Bull sits atop a hill overlooking the regional park, behind the museum.

=== Rodeo Ranch Museum ===
The Rodeo Ranch Museum features exhibits about the cowboys and ranchers who settled the area in the 1880s. Exhibits include photographs, pioneer, rodeo and Western artefacts. The information centre for the East Block of Grasslands National Park is located in the museum.

=== Wood Mountain Stampede ===
In 1890, the Wood Mountain Stampede was established by the North-West Mounted Police to promote sports and to celebrate the July 1 Dominion Day holiday. It became an annual event held every second weekend in July and is Canada's longest-running annual rodeo.

== See also ==
- History of Saskatchewan
- List of protected areas of Saskatchewan
- Tourism in Saskatchewan
