= Loon Lake, Saskatchewan =

Village in Saskatchewan, Canada

Loon Lake
- Village
- Village of Loon Lake
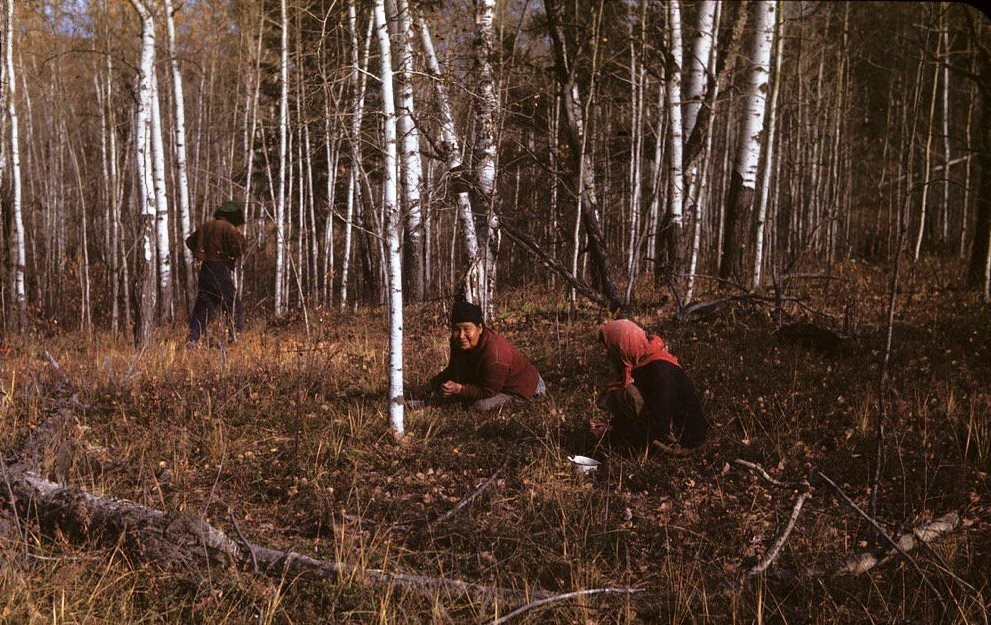
- Cree women picking cranberries, 1947

- Loon Lake in Saskatchewan Loon Lake (Canada)
- Coordinates: 54°00′47″N 109°05′38″W
- Country: Canada
- Province: Saskatchewan
- Region: West-central
- Census division: 17
- Rural Municipality: Loon Lake

Government
  - Type: Municipal
  - Governing body: Loon Lake Village Council
  - Mayor: Brian Hirschfeld
  - Administrator: Erin Simpson

Area
  - Total: 0.66 km^{2} (0.25 sq mi)

Population (2016)
  - Total: 288
  - Density: 435.8/km^{2} (1,129/sq mi)
- Time zone: UTC-6 (CST)
- Postal code: S0M 1L0
- Area code: 306
- Highways: Highway 26 Highway 699
- Website: Village of Loon Lake

Loon Lake (2016 population: 288) is a village in the Canadian province of Saskatchewan within the Rural Municipality of Loon Lake No. 561 and Census Division No. 17. The Makwa Sahgaiehcan First Nation reserve is to the east of the village. The village is located on Highway 26 north-east of the city of Lloydminster.

== Demographics ==
Population history (1981–2016)
Year	Pop.	±%
1981	369	—
1986	372	+0.8%
1991	366	−1.6%
1996	390	+6.6%
2001	318	−18.5%
2006	306	−3.8%
2011	314	+2.6%
2016	288	−8.3%
Source: Statistics Canada via Saskatchewan Bureau of Statistics

In the 2021 Census of Population conducted by Statistics Canada, Loon Lake had a population of 281 living in 126 of its 166 total private dwellings, a change of −2.4% from its 2016 population of 288. With a land area of 0.74 km^{2} (0.29 sq mi), it had a population density of 379.7/km^{2} (983.5/sq mi) in 2021.

In the 2016 Census of Population, the village of Loon Lake recorded a population of 288 living in 117 of its 158 total private dwellings, a −9% change from its 2011 population of 314. With a land area of 0.66 km^{2} (0.25 sq mi), it had a population density of 436.4/km^{2} (1,130.2/sq mi) in 2016.

== History ==
Loon Lake incorporated as a village on January 1, 1950.

Steele Narrows, a strait in Makwa Lake, is approximately 15 km (9.3 mi) from the village and is the site of the Battle of Loon Lake, which was last battle of the North-West Rebellion. The battle was fought on June 3, 1885, and resulted in the defeat of the Cree First Nations band government which ended the rebellion. It is a National Historic Site of Canada and part of Steele Narrows Provincial Park.

== Attractions ==
Loon Lake has a 9-hole grass greens golf course with a licensed dining area. The village offers postal, food, and gas. There are also two resorts, Pine Cove and Makwa Lake, that offer rental cabins.

About 5 km to the west of the village is Makwa Lake Provincial Park and on nearby Jumbo Lake is Silver Birch Bible Camp. There are seven fresh water lakes within 5 miles (8 km) of the village with recreation opportunities.

Every fall, there is game hunting within 10 miles (16 km) with a variety of outfitters.

== Climate ==
Loon Lake has a subarctic climate (Dfc), with long, bitterly cold winters lasting more than half of the year and short but warm and rainy summers with cool nights.

Climate data for Loon Lake
Month	Jan	Feb	Mar	Apr	May	Jun	Jul	Aug	Sep	Oct	Nov	Dec	Year
Record high °C (°F)	11.7 (53.1)	13.5 (56.3)	17 (63)	30 (86)	33 (91)	35.6 (96.1)	36.7 (98.1)	36 (97)	34.4 (93.9)	28.9 (84.0)	19.5 (67.1)	11 (52)	36.7 (98.1)
Mean daily maximum °C (°F)	−11.7 (10.9)	−6.9 (19.6)	−0.2 (31.6)	9.4 (48.9)	17 (63)	20.7 (69.3)	22.8 (73.0)	22 (72)	15.7 (60.3)	9 (48)	−2.7 (27.1)	−9.7 (14.5)	7.1 (44.8)
Daily mean °C (°F)	−17.4 (0.7)	−13.3 (8.1)	−6.6 (20.1)	3.1 (37.6)	9.8 (49.6)	14 (57)	16.3 (61.3)	15 (59)	9.4 (48.9)	3.4 (38.1)	−7.2 (19.0)	−15.1 (4.8)	1 (34)
Mean daily minimum °C (°F)	−23 (−9)	−19.7 (−3.5)	−13 (9)	−3.1 (26.4)	2.7 (36.9)	7.3 (45.1)	9.7 (49.5)	8.1 (46.6)	3.1 (37.6)	−2.3 (27.9)	−11.7 (10.9)	−20.4 (−4.7)	−5.2 (22.6)
Record low °C (°F)	−49 (−56)	−46 (−51)	−45 (−49)	−34 (−29)	−10.6 (12.9)	−4 (25)	−1.5 (29.3)	−3 (27)	−12.8 (9.0)	−24 (−11)	−41.1 (−42.0)	−46 (−51)	−49 (−56)
Average precipitation mm (inches)	16.1 (0.63)	11.4 (0.45)	18.4 (0.72)	23.7 (0.93)	46 (1.8)	71.8 (2.83)	70 (2.8)	64.9 (2.56)	46.9 (1.85)	17.2 (0.68)	18 (0.7)	18.7 (0.74)	423 (16.7)
Source: Environment Canada

== See also ==
- List of communities in Saskatchewan
- List of villages in Saskatchewan
