= List of provincial parks in Saskatchewan =

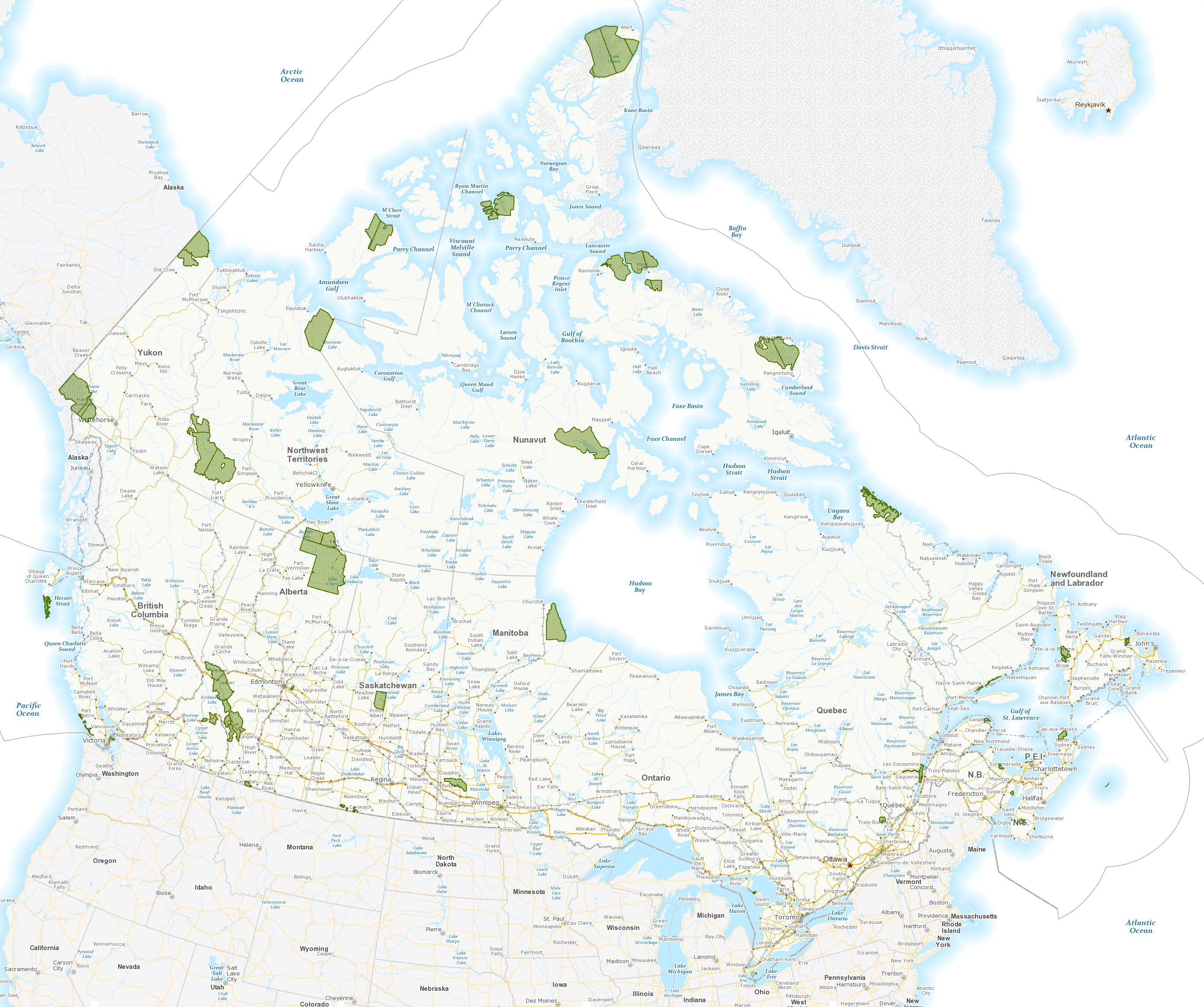
Canada's national parks and reserves by provinces and territories

This is a list of provincial parks in Saskatchewan, Canada. The parks are owned by the Saskatchewan government and administered by Sask Parks through the Ministry of Parks, Culture and Sport.

== History ==
The federal government transferred control of natural resources to the western provinces in 1930 with the Natural Resources Acts. At that time, the Saskatchewan government set up its own Department of Natural Resources. In an attempt to get people working and to encourage tourism during the Great Depression, several projects were set up by the government, including setting up a provincial park system in 1931. The founding parks include Cypress Hills, Duck Mountain, Good Spirit Lake, Moose Mountain, Katepwa Point, and Little Manitou. Greenwater Lake was added in 1932. Two more parks were added by the end of the 1930s. Little Manitou ceased to be a provincial park in 1956 and, in 1962, it became a regional park.

Designated in 2018, Porcupine Hills Provincial Park is Saskatchewan's newest provincial park.

== List of parks ==
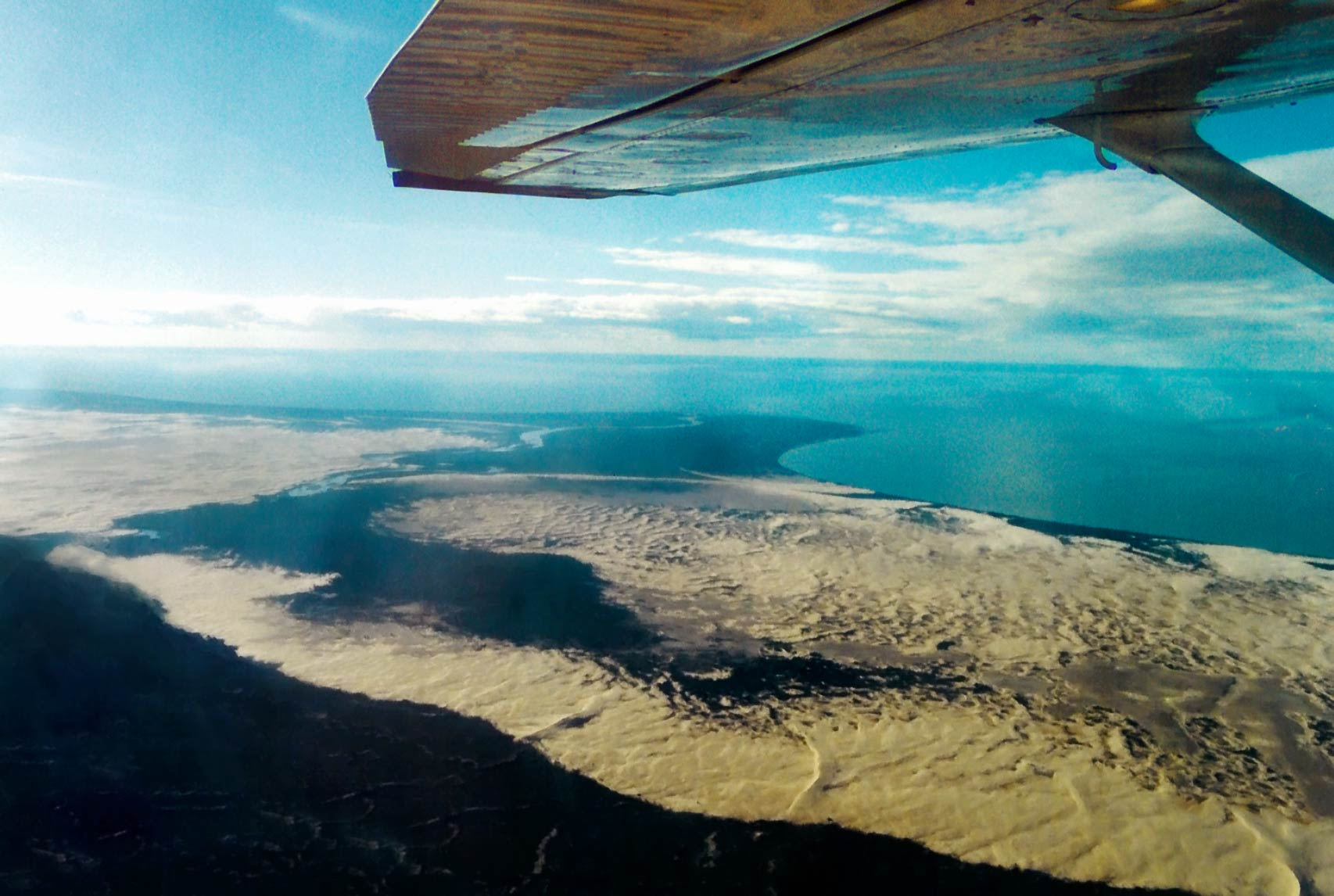
Athabasca Sand Dunes Provincial Park

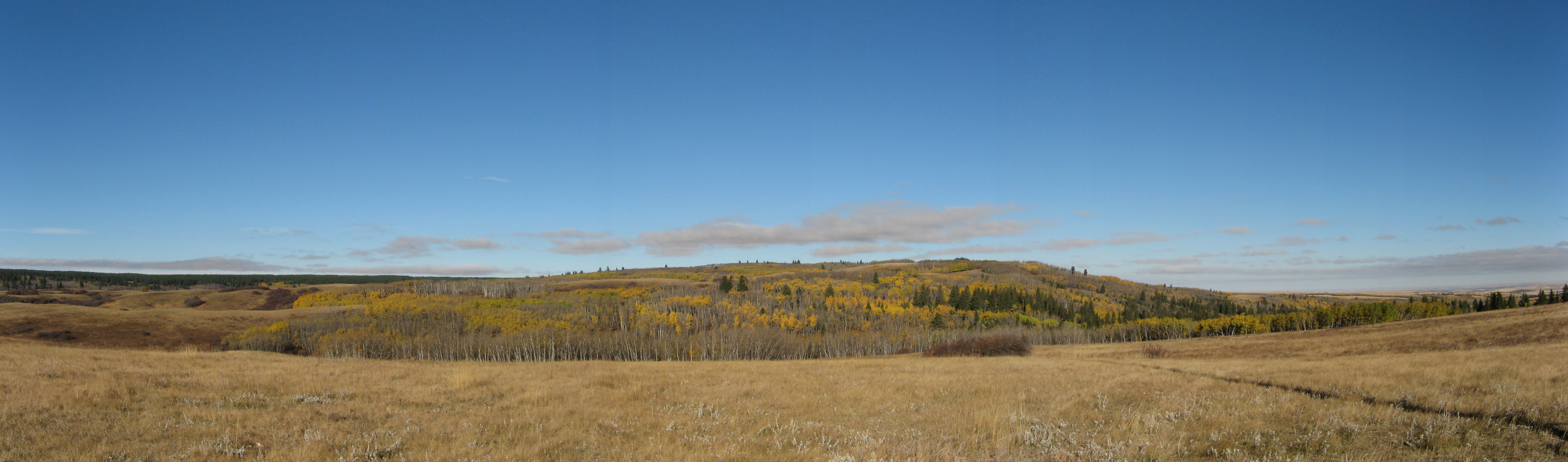
Cypress Hills Interprovincial Park

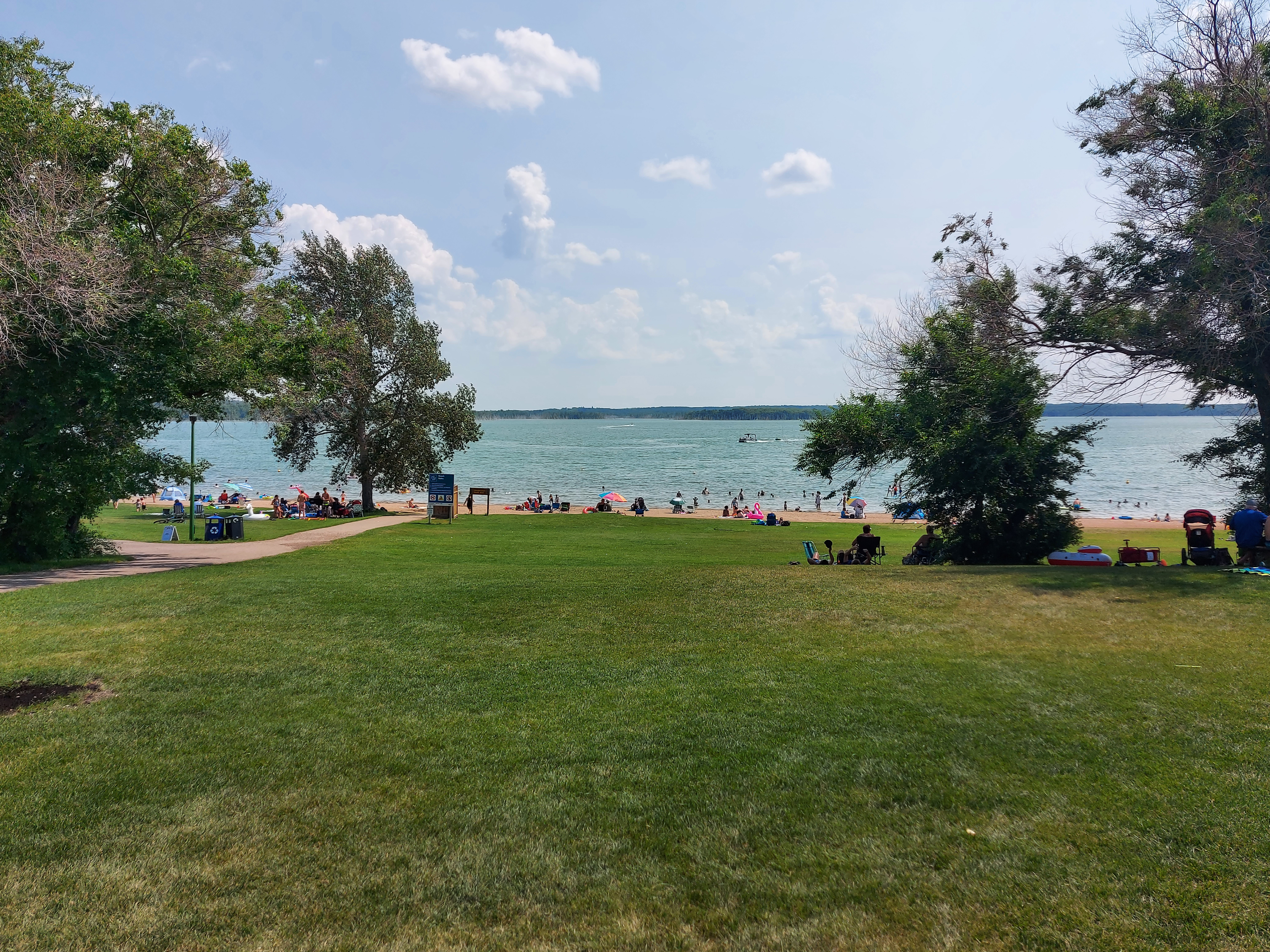
Main Beach Kenosee Lake, Moose Mountain Provincial Park

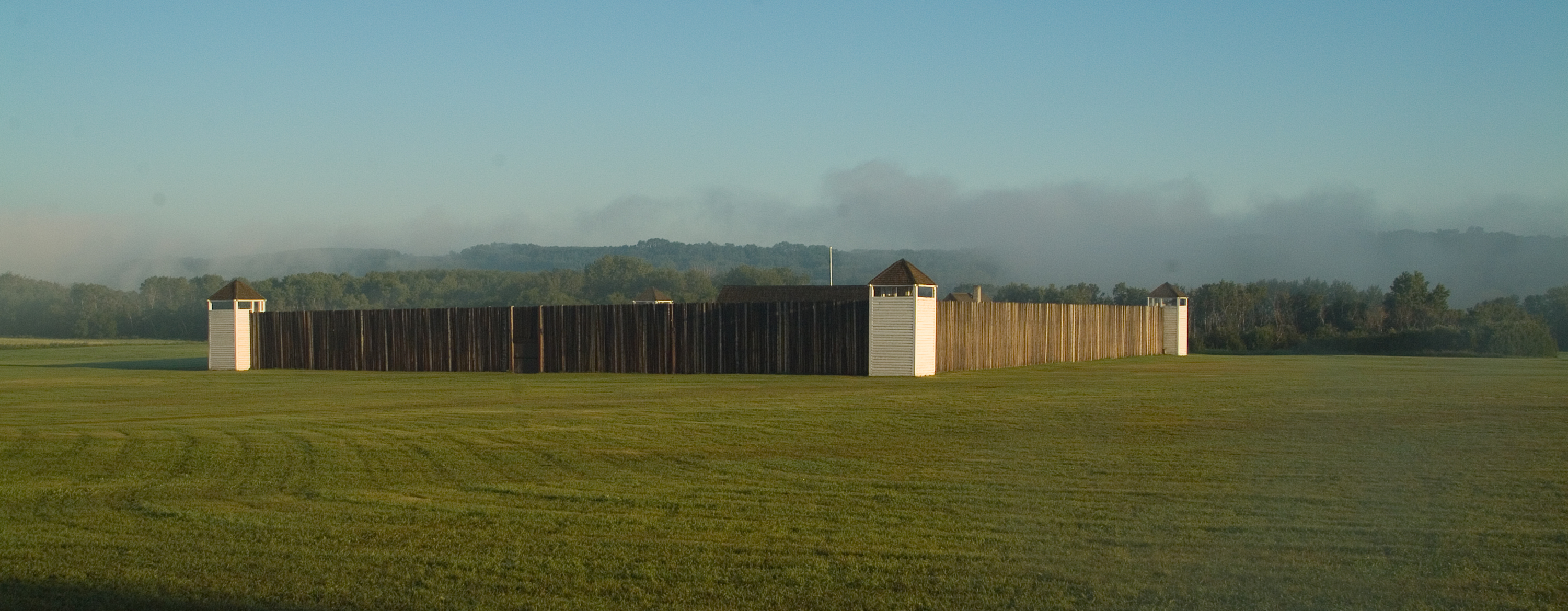
Fort Carlton Provincial Park

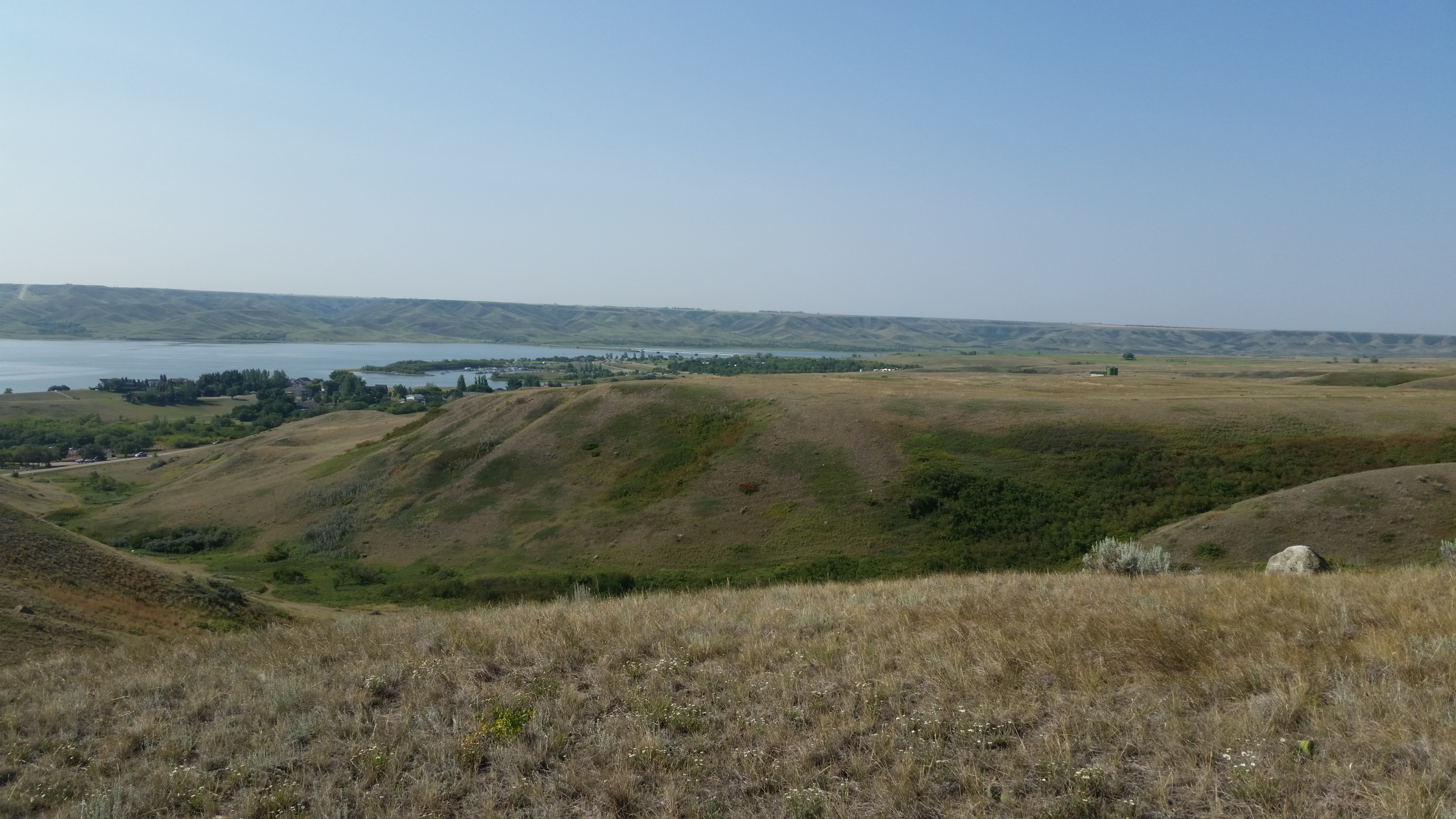
Saskatchewan Landing Provincial Park

The list of parks, and their types, come from The Parks Act. The following are the 39 parks operated by Sask Parks.

Name	Location	Established	Type	Coordinates
Athabasca Sand Dunes Provincial Park	Northern Administration District	1992	Wilderness	59.0631°N 108.962°W
The Battlefords Provincial Park	RM of Meota	1960	Recreational	53.1176°N 108.3743°W
Blackstrap Provincial Park	RM of Dundurn	1986	Recreational	51.7556°N 106.458°W
Bronson Forest Provincial Recreation Site	RM of Loon Lake		Recreational	53.9263°N 109.5769°W
Buffalo Pound Provincial Park	RM of Marquis	1963	Recreational	50.5872°N 105.396°W
Candle Lake Provincial Park	RM of Paddockwood	1986	Recreational	53.8016°N 105.3317°W
Cannington Manor Provincial Park	RM of Moose Mountain	1986	Historical	49.7333°N 102.046°W
Clarence-Steepbank Lakes Provincial Park	Northern Administration District	1994	Wilderness	54.2471°N 104.9951°W
Clearwater River Provincial Park	Northern Administration District	1986	Wilderness	56.8983°N 108.981°W
Crooked Lake Provincial Park	RM of Grayson	1986	Recreational	50.6074°N 102.6733°W
Cumberland House Provincial Park	Northern Administration District	1986	Historical	53.96°N 102.263°W
Cypress Hills Interprovincial Park	RM of Maple Creek	1931	Natural environment	49°34′31″N 110°00′23″W
Danielson Provincial Park	RM of Loreburn	1971	Recreational	51.254°N 106.876°W
Douglas Provincial Park	RM of Maple Bush	1973	Natural environment	51.0491°N 106.4686°W
Duck Mountain Provincial Park	RM of St. Philips	1931	Natural environment	51.6833°N 101.633°W
Echo Valley Provincial Park	RM of North Qu'Appelle	1960	Recreational	54.75°N 103.767°W
Fort Carlton Provincial Park	RM of Duck Lake	1986	Historical	52.873°N 106.527°W
Fort Pitt Provincial Park	RM of Frenchman Butte	1986	Historical	53.5733°N 109.792°W
Good Spirit Lake Provincial Park	RM of Good Lake	1931	Natural environment	51.5077°N 102.6195°W
Great Blue Heron Provincial Park	RM of Lakeland	2013	Recreational	53.5984°N 105.9221°W
Greenwater Lake Provincial Park	RM of Bjorkdale; RM of Kelvington	1932	Natural environment	52.532°N 103.505°W
Holy Trinity Anglican Church Provincial Historic Site	Stanely Mission	1981	Historical	55°25′3.25″N 104°33′2.5″W
Katepwa Point Provincial Park	RM of Abernethy	1931	Recreational	50.658°N 103.646°W
Lac La Ronge Provincial Park	Northern Administration District	1939	Natural environment	55.2714°N 104.732°W
Last Mountain House Provincial Park	RM of Longlaketon	1986	Historical	55.2714°N 104.732°W
Makwa Lake Provincial Park	RM of Loon Lake	1986	Natural environment	54.0155°N 109.2006°W
Meadow Lake Provincial Park	RM of Meadow Lake; RM of Beaver River	1959	Natural environment	54.4839°N 108.949°W
Moose Mountain Provincial Park	RM of Wawken	1931	Natural environment	49.8211°N 102.376°W
Narrow Hills Provincial Park	Northern Administration District	1934	Natural environment	54.0908°N 104.642°W
Pike Lake Provincial Park	RM of Vanscoy	1960	Recreational	51.8967°N 106.818°W
Porcupine Hills Provincial Park	RM of Hudson Bay	2018	Natural environment	52°27′33″N 102°22′55″W
Regina Beach Recreation Site	Regina Beach		Recreational	50.7926°N 104.9751°W
Rowan's Ravine Provincial Park	RM of McKillop	1960	Recreational	50°59′35″N 105°10′26″W
Saskatchewan Landing Provincial Park	RM of Saskatchewan Landing	1973	Natural environment	50.666°N 107.990°W
St. Victor Petroglyphs Provincial Park	RM of Willow Bunch	1986	Historical	49.4118°N 105.8712°W
Steele Narrows Provincial Park	RM of Loon Lake	1986	Historical	54.0391°N 109.3087°W
Touchwood Hills Post Provincial Park	RM of Kellross	1986	Historical	51.3634°N 104.0964°W
Wildcat Hill Provincial Park	RM of Hudson Bay	1992	Wilderness	53.254°N 102.484°W
Wood Mountain Post Provincial Park	RM of Old Post	1986	Historical	49.3158°N 106.3789°W

== See also ==
- List of protected areas of Saskatchewan
- List of Canadian protected areas
