= Wood Mountain Post Provincial Park =

Provincial park in Saskatchewan, Canada

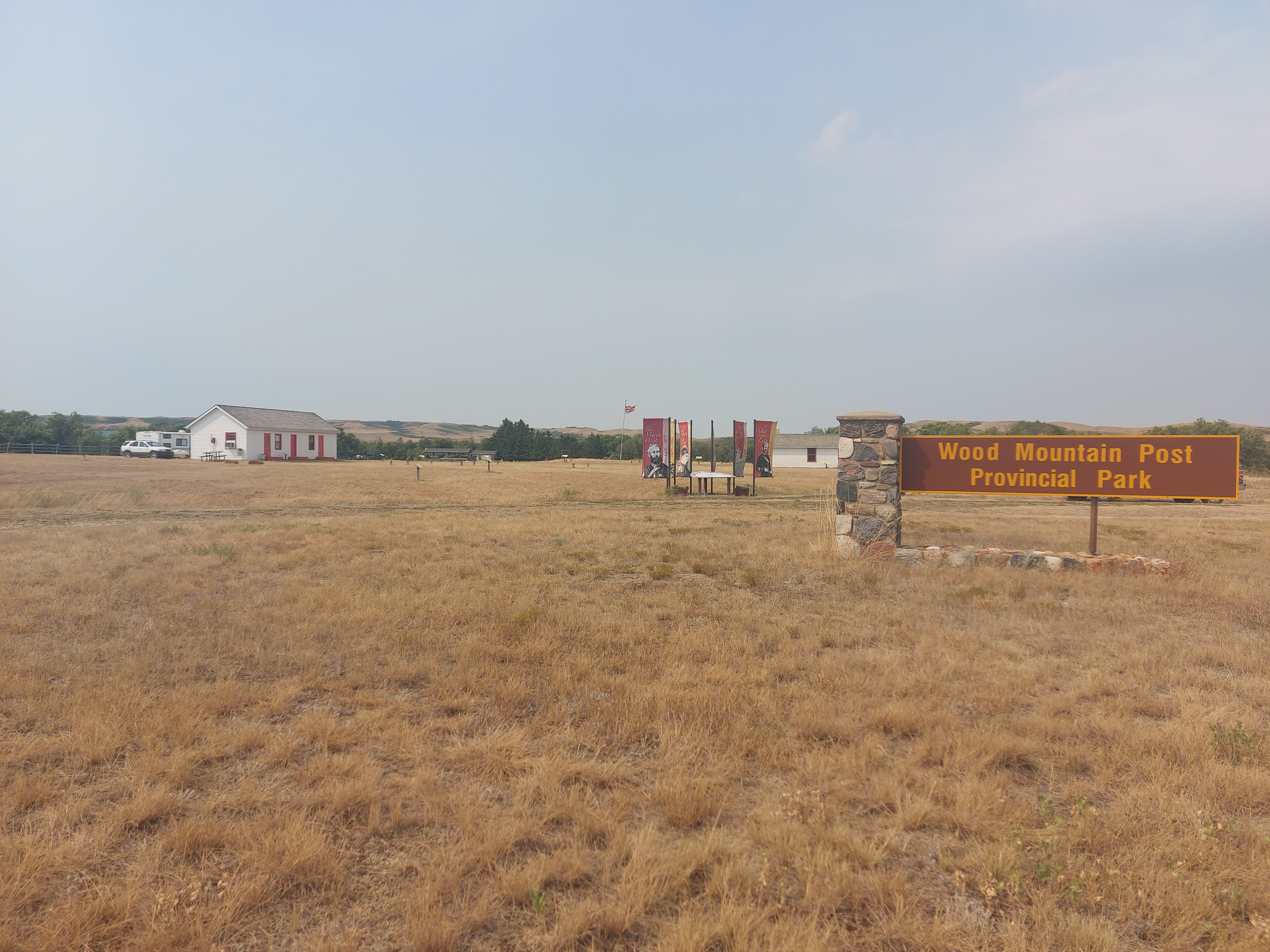
- Wood Mountain Post Provincial Park

- Location within Saskatchewan Location within Canada
- Interactive map of Wood Mountain Post Provincial Park
- 49.3158°N 106.3789°W
- Location: RM of Old Post No. 43, Saskatchewan, Canada

Site notes
- Current use: Historic site
- Governing body: Sask Parks

National Historic Site of Canada
- Official name: Wood Mountain Post Provincial Historic Park
- Designated: 1986

Wood Mountain Post Provincial Park is a 5.48-hectare historical provincial park in Saskatchewan, Canada. The site was designated as an historic site in the 1960s and became a provincial park in 1986. Originally, it was the location of a North-West Mounted Police (NWMP) post that operated from 1887 to 1918. The post was established to develop relations with local Indians, patrol the Canada–United States border, and to perform general policing duties.

Wood Mountain Post Provincial Park is located in the RM of Old Post No. 43 along Highway 18, about 8 kilometres (5.0 mi) south of the village of Wood Mountain and 35 kilometres (22 mi) north of the Canada–United States border. It is in the Wood Mountain Hills, adjacent to Wood Mountain Creek (which is a tributary of Wood River via Lynthorpe Creek) and Wood Mountain Regional Park. The provincial park has a picnic area and the neighbouring regional park has a campground.

== History ==
In 1874, the North-West Mounted Police marched west in response to the Cypress Hills Massacre. Along the route was a depot in the Wood Mountain Hills that was used by the Boundary Commission when the Canada–United States border was surveyed. The NWMP used that depot intermittently from 1874 until 1887 to police whisky traders, horse thieves, and cattle rustlers. In 1876, Chief Sitting Bull and 5,000 members of the Lakota Sioux took refuge at the post after the Battle of the Little Bighorn in the Montana Territory of the United States. They remained in the area for five years before Chief Sitting Bull and many of them returned to the US. The First Nations that remained in Saskatchewan make up the present-day Wood Mountain Lakota First Nation. Wood Mountain Post was closed in 1883 and then re-opened in 1885 with the out-break of the North-West Rebellion. Two years later, the dilapidated buildings were abandoned and new buildings were constructed 300 metres (980 ft) to the south-east, across Wood Mountain Creek. This new site is the location of the current provincial park and the original site is the location of Wood Mountain Regional Park. Wood Mountain Post closed for the final time in 1918.

== Reconstruction and historical site ==
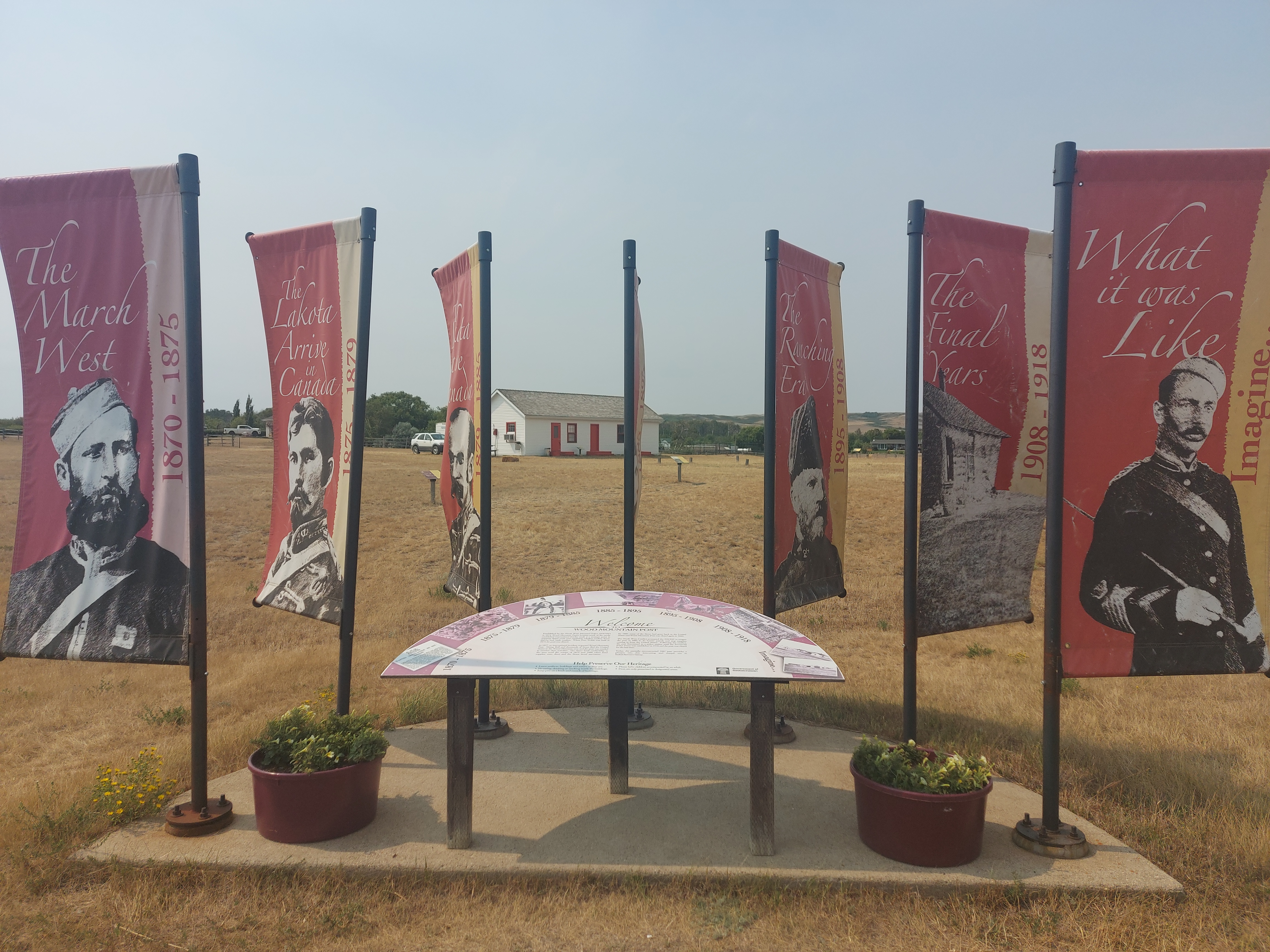
Wood Mountain Post Provincial Park banners

In the 1960s, the Wood Mountain Post site was designated an historical site of Canada. Two buildings — a barracks and a kitchen / storehouse — were reconstructed on their original locations and the foundations of other former buildings were outlined. A large number of artefacts have been recovered as well as the locations of cellars and trails. The artefacts and reconstructed buildings tell the story of Major James Walsh of the NWMP and his negotiations with Chief Sitting Bull.

== See also ==
- History of Saskatchewan
- List of National Historic Sites of Canada in Saskatchewan
- Canadian Register of Historic Places
- List of historic places in rural municipalities of Saskatchewan
- List of protected areas of Saskatchewan
- Tourism in Saskatchewan
