= Rowan's Ravine Provincial Park =

Provincial park in Saskatchewan, Canada

- Location within Saskatchewan Location within Canada
- Interactive map of Rowan's Ravine Provincial Park
- Location: Saskatchewan
- Nearest town: Strasbourg
- Coordinates: 50°59′35″N 105°10′26″W
- Established: 1960
- Governing body: Sask Parks

Rowan's Ravine Provincial Park is a provincial park in the Canadian province of Saskatchewan. It is on the eastern shore of Last Mountain Lake near a coulee named Rowan's Ravine (50.9865°N 105.1509°W) in the RM of McKillop No. 220. Highway 220 provides access to the park and the town of Strasbourg is about 25 kilometres (16 mi) away. The hamlet of Uhl's Bay is less than a mile away just off of Highway 220.

In 2021, $10.7 million was spent upgrading highways in and around the park, including Highway 322 north from Glen Harbour to Highway 220 and from Highway 220 to the park. Inside the park, the Underwood Campground loops, boat launch, and day-use parking lot were also paved.

== Attractions and amenities ==
This 270-hectare park has amenities including camping, hiking, picnicking, swimming, fishing, boating, mini-golf, baseball diamonds, and beach volleyball. There are also services such as washrooms, showers, and a laundry facility. The park is also home to Mama Bear's Den, a licensed restaurant. At the point where Rowan's Ravine and its creek meet up with Last Mountain Lake, there's a small harbour with a marina, a convenience store, and an outfitter's called G&S Marina Outfitters. Every September, there's a large fishing tournament held out of the marina called Last Mountain Fall Walleye Classic.

=== Camping ===
There are two campgrounds in the park. Underwood Campground is at the far north-west corner of the park, next to Last Mountain Lake, and Elmwood Campground is along the east side of Underwood. Both sites have electric hook-ups and access to washrooms, laundry, showers, and potable water. Sani-dumps are also available.

=== Beach area ===
The beach area of the park is on a point of land that juts out into the lake. It is one of Saskatchewan's longest natural sandy beaches and being on a point of land, at least one side is usually sheltered from the wind. All of the trees around the area were planted as before the park, the area had no trees and was just grassland.

=== Wild Waves Waterpark ===
Wild Waves Waterpark is an inflatable, floating waterpark located on the south side of the point at the main beach at Rowan's Ravine Provincial Park. It features towers, slides, cliffs, a teeter totter, climbing wall, trampoline, and multiple obstacles.

== See also ==
- List of protected areas of Saskatchewan
- Tourism in Saskatchewan
