= Kacy & Clayton =

Canadian folk band

- Origin: Wood Mountain, Saskatchewan, Canada
- Genres: Folk; Roots; Americana
- Years active: 2011–present
- Labels: New West
- Members: Clayton Linthicum; Kacy Anderson
- Website: http://www.kacyandclayton.com/

Kacy & Clayton is a Canadian folk/roots duo originating from Wood Mountain, Saskatchewan. The duo consists of second cousins Clayton Linthicum on guitar and Kacy Anderson on vocals.

They released their second album Strange Country in 2015, In 2016, Kacy & Clayton signed to New West Records, which rereleased Strange Country that year.

The duo released their follow-up album, The Siren’s Song, in August 2017 via New West Records. After having toured with Wilco for their previous album, The Siren’s Song was produced and recorded by Jeff Tweedy in his studio The Loft in Chicago. The album was supported with a tour as opening act for The Decemberists.

== Discography ==
- Kacy & Clayton (2011)
- The Day Is Past and Gone (2013)
- Strange Country (November 2015)
- Strange Country (Rereleased May 2016, New West)
- The Siren's Song (August 2017, New West)
- Carrying On (October 2019, New West)
- Plastic Bouquet (2020, collaboration with Marlon Williams) No. 58 AUS

== Awards ==
The band received two Canadian Folk Music Award nominations at the 10th Canadian Folk Music Awards in 2014, for New/Emerging Artist of the Year and Young Performer of the Year. They won the Young Performer award.

In 2017, the band's album The Siren's Song was a shortlisted Juno Award finalist for Juno Award for Contemporary Roots Album of the Year.

In 2018, The Siren's Song was a longlisted nominee for the 2018 Polaris Music Prize.
