= Mount Wood =

Mount Wood may refer to:

- Mount Wood (Palmer Land), Antarctica
- Mount Wood (Victoria Land), Antarctica
- Mount Wood (New South Wales), in Sturt National Park, Australia
- Mount Wood (Yukon), Canada
- Mount Wood (Occidental Mindoro), Philippines
- Mount Wood (California), US
- Mount Wood (Montana), US

== See also ==
- Mount Woods
- Wood Mountain (disambiguation)
