= Andrew Suknaski =

Canadian poet and visual artist

Andrew Suknaski (July 30, 1942 – May 3, 2012) was a Canadian poet and visual artist.

== Early life and education ==
He was born on a homestead near Wood Mountain, Saskatchewan and studied at a number of institutions, receiving a diploma of Fine Arts from the Kootenay School of Art in 1967.

== Career ==
He was an editor for Anak Press and Deodar Shadow Press, and founded the underground magazine Elfin Plot in Vancouver in 1969. From 1977 to 1978, he was writer-in-residence at St. John's College, University of Manitoba. His early works were published in Al Purdy's anthology Storm Warning (1971). His first collection was Wood Mountain Poems (1976), edited by Purdy, followed by The Ghosts Call You Poor (1978) and In The Name of Narid (1981). Ghosts won him the Canadian Authors' Association Poetry Award in 1979. Suknaski also worked as a researcher for the National Film Board of Canada, contributing to such films as Grain Elevator (1981), by Charles Konowal, and The Disinherited (1985), by Harvey Spak. In 1978, Spak made a documentary about Suknaski, Wood Mountain Poems. Suknaski's Polish and Ukrainian heritage, his concern for First Nations people and for the history and culture of the Canadian Prairies are strongly reflected in his work. He stopped writing in the 1980s and died in Moose Jaw on May 3, 2012.

Montage for an Interstellar Cry (1982) and Silk Trail (1985) were the first and third parts respectively of a larger work that was to be called "Celestial Mechanics.

The National Film Board celebrated his Wood Mountain Poems with a documentary film featuring the author and his native Wood Mountain, Saskatchewan. Suknaski was also known for erratic acts of poetry. He once launched poems that had been folded into paper airplanes from an airplane flying over Edmonton, Alberta and he, along with Al Purdy, launched poems in bottles down the Saskatchewan River.

His last full-length book was Silk Trail, which takes a very Poundian look at the construction of the transcontinental railway. see Canadian National Railway and the Chinese immigrant labourers, known as Coolies, that were integral to its success. Suknaski first appeared on the Canadian literary scene in two influential anthologies, Storm Warning, edited by Al Purdy, and Four Parts Sand which also featured Judith Copithorne, bill bissett and Earle Birney.

== Bibliography ==
- 1972: Old Mill
- 1973: Suicide Notes: Book I
- 1974: In Leaving
- 1974: Wood Mountain Poems (Macmillan of Canada)
- 1975: Leaving Wood Mountain
- 1975: Blind Man's House
- 1976: Writing on Stone: Poem Drawings 1966 - 76
- 1978: Ghosts Call You Poor
- 1981: In The Name of Narid
- 1976: Octomi
- 1979: East of Myloona
- 1982: Montage for an Interstellar Cry
- 1982: The Land They Gave Away
- 1985: Silk Trail

== See also ==
- List of Canadian poets
