= Limerick, Saskatchewan =

Village in Saskatchewan, Canada

Limerick
- Village
- Village of Limerick
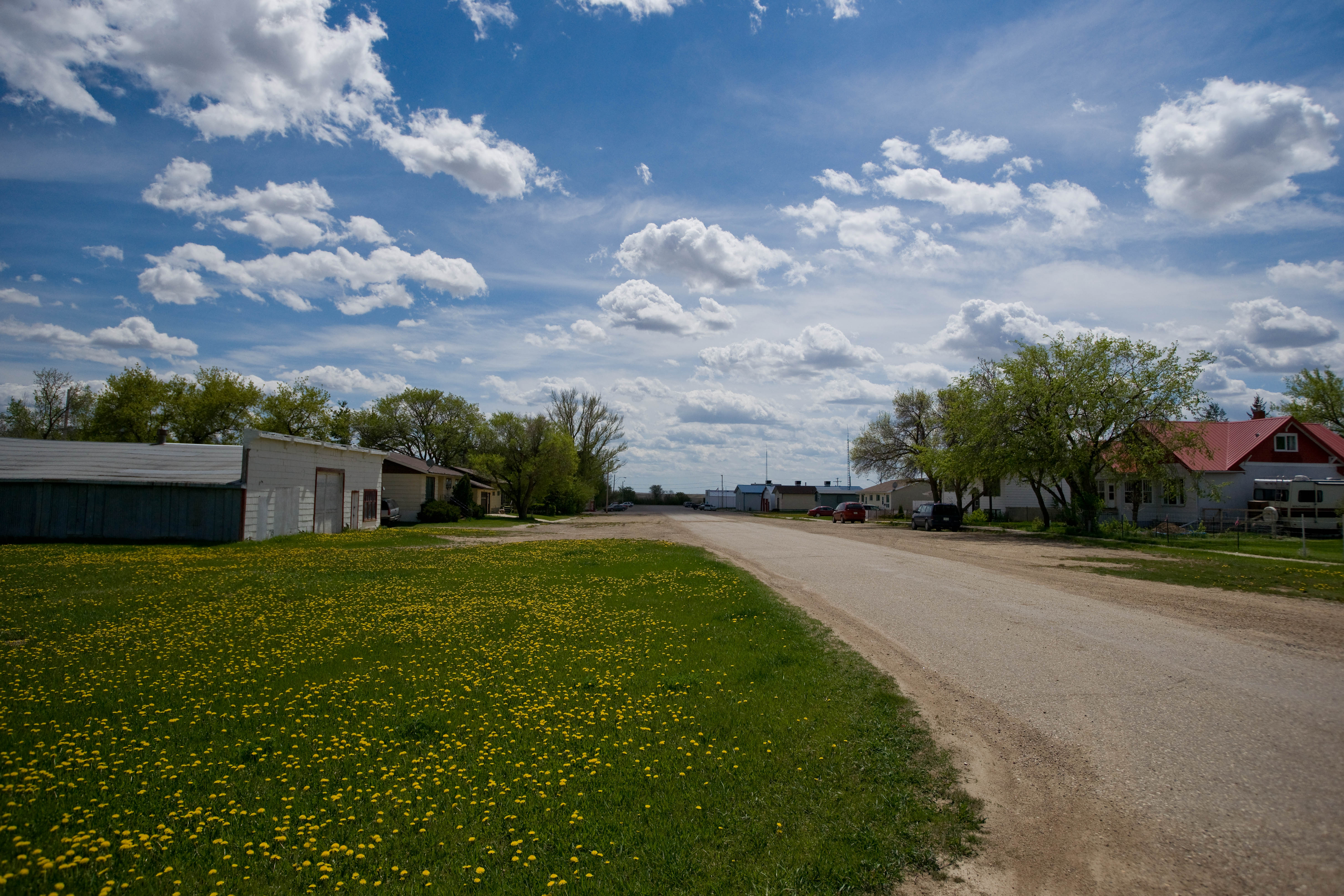

- Location within Stonehenge No. 73 Location within Saskatchewan
- Coordinates: 49°39′00″N 106°16′01″W
- Country: Canada
- Province: Saskatchewan
- Rural municipality: Stonehenge No. 73

Government
  - Type: Municipal
  - Governing body: Limerick Village Council
  - Mayor: Robert Smith
  - Administrator: Tammy Franks

Area
  - Total: 0.79 km^{2} (0.31 sq mi)

Population (2016)
  - Total: 115
  - Density: 146.5/km^{2} (379/sq mi)
- Time zone: UTC-6 (CST)
- Postal code: S0H 2P0
- Area code: 306
- Highways: Highway 13 / Highway 358 / Highway 608 / Red Coat Trail
- Railways: Red Coat Road and Rail

Limerick (2016 population: 115) is a village in the Canadian province of Saskatchewan within the Rural Municipality of Stonehenge No. 73 and Census Division No. 3. The village is about 150 kilometres (93 mi) north of the U.S. border near the towns of Lafleche and Gravelbourg. The village is named after the Irish city of Limerick.

== History ==
Limerick was incorporated as a village on July 10, 1913.

== Demographics ==
Population history (1981–2016)
Year	Pop.	±%
1981	164	—
1986	175	+6.7%
1991	155	−11.4%
1996	165	+6.5%
2001	146	−11.5%
2006	130	−11.0%
2011	115	−11.5%
2016	115	+0.0%
Source: Statistics Canada via Saskatchewan Bureau of Statistics

In the 2021 Census of Population conducted by Statistics Canada, Limerick had a population of 114 living in 56 of its 63 total private dwellings, a change of −0.9% from its 2016 population of 115. With a land area of 0.61 km^{2} (0.24 sq mi), it had a population density of 186.9/km^{2} (484.0/sq mi) in 2021.

In the 2016 Census of Population, the Village of Limerick recorded a population of 115 living in 58 of its 65 total private dwellings, a 0% change from its 2011 population of 115. With a land area of 0.79 km^{2} (0.31 sq mi), it had a population density of 145.6/km^{2} (377.0/sq mi) in 2016.

== See also ==
- List of communities in Saskatchewan
- List of villages in Saskatchewan
