= Manitoba Interdiocesan Catholic Schools =

Manitoba Interdiocesan Catholic Schools, Inc. (MICS) was a Catholic school organization in Manitoba, Canada. It was established in 1993 as a successor to the Manitoba Catholic School Trustees' Association, and was dissolved in 1999. The organization's mission was to "coordinate and promote the aims and objectives of Catholic education, and to provide administrative and technical assistance to Catholic schools."

Archbishops Antoine Hacault, Michael Bzdel and Leonard Wall made the decision to dissolve MICS on April 21, 1999. A representative of the Roman Catholic Archdiocese of Winnipeg indicated that this step was taken in order to "restore, consolidate and strengthen the bishops' responsibilities for Catholic education in their respective dioceses", reversing previous decisions wherein some of these responsibilities had been delegated to the central organization. Following its dissolution, the dioceses of St. Boniface and Winnipeg and the Ukrainian Catholic Archeparchy of Winnipeg were entrusted with the operation of separate educational bodies.
