= Jumbo Lake =

Lake in Saskatchewan, Canada

- Big Jumbo Lake
- Location in Saskatchewan Jumbo Lake (Canada)
- Location: RM of Loon Lake No. 561, Saskatchewan
- Coordinates: 54.0228°N 109.2222°W
- Part of: Churchill River drainage basin
- Basin countries: Canada
- Surface area: 502 ha (1,240 acres)
- Max. depth: 14.63 m (48.0 ft)
- Shore length^{1}: 31.1 km (19.3 mi)
- Surface elevation: 524 m (1,719 ft)
- Settlements: None
- ^{1} Shore length is not a well-defined measure.

Jumbo Lake is a lake in the Canadian province of Saskatchewan in the transition zone between parkland and boreal forest. It is also known as "Big" Jumbo Lake to differentiate it from the adjoining Little Jumbo Lake. Big and Little Jumbo Lakes make up the heart of Makwa Lake Provincial Park and are part of several inter-connected lakes that include Makwa Lake and Upper Makwa Lake. The southern half of the lake is within Makwa Lake Provincial Park and the northern half is within Makwa Lake 129B Indian reserve. Access to both lakes is from Highway 699.

Jumbo, Little Jumbo, and Makwa Lakes are all connected and the water levels are controlled by the Makwa Lake Control dam, which is located at the source of the Makwa River at the north-east corner of Makwa Lake.

== Parks and recreation ==
Most of the southern half of Big and Little Jumbo Lakes are within Makwa Lake Provincial Park. There are three campgrounds with about 260 campsites and several beaches around the lakes. Jumbo Beach Campground, Stabler Point Campground, Makwa Lake Beach, and Loon Lake Golf Course are located on Little Jumbo while Mewasin Beach Campground and Silver Birch Bible Camp are on Big Jumbo.

== Fish species ==
Fish species commonly found in Jumbo Lake include northern pike, walleye, and yellow perch.

== See also ==
- List of lakes of Saskatchewan
- Tourism in Saskatchewan
- List of protected areas of Saskatchewan
