= Steele Narrows Provincial Park =

Provincial park in Saskatchewan, Canada

- Location within Saskatchewan Location within Canada
- 54.0391°N 109.3087°W
- Location: Saskatchewan, Canada

History
- Original use: Battle of Loon Lake

Site notes
- Current use: Historic site / recreation area
- Governing body: Sask Parks
- Owner

National Historic Site of Canada
- Official name: Steele Narrows National Historic Site of Canada
- Designated: 1986

Steele Narrows Provincial Park is an historical provincial park in the west-central region of Saskatchewan, Canada, in the transition zone between parkland and boreal forest. It is located on Makwa Lake at Steele Narrows – the channel that separates Sanderson Bay from Makwa Lake – about 10 kilometres (6.2 mi) west of the village of Loon Lake along Highway 699. The park is the site of the Battle of Loon Lake, which was not only the last battle of the North-West Rebellion, but also the last battle fought on Canadian soil. The battle occurred on 3 June 1885.

On 31 May 1950, the site was designated a National Historic Site of Canada and on 26 May 1986, the provincial park was established.

The 88-hectare park has plaques and information related to the battle, including white concrete markers which denote the locations of significant events during the battle. The park's landscape features rolling hills, forests, and muskeg and remains virtually unchanged from the time of the battle. Along with the historical monument, there is also a picnic area, fish cleaning station, and boat launch. Fish commonly found in Makwa Lake include northern pike, walleye, and yellow perch.

== See also ==
- History of Saskatchewan
- List of protected areas of Saskatchewan
- Makwa Lake Provincial Park
- Tourism in Saskatchewan
