= Rural Municipality of Stonehenge No. 73 =

Rural municipality in Saskatchewan, Canada

Stonehenge No. 73
- Rural municipality
- Rural Municipality of Stonehenge No. 73
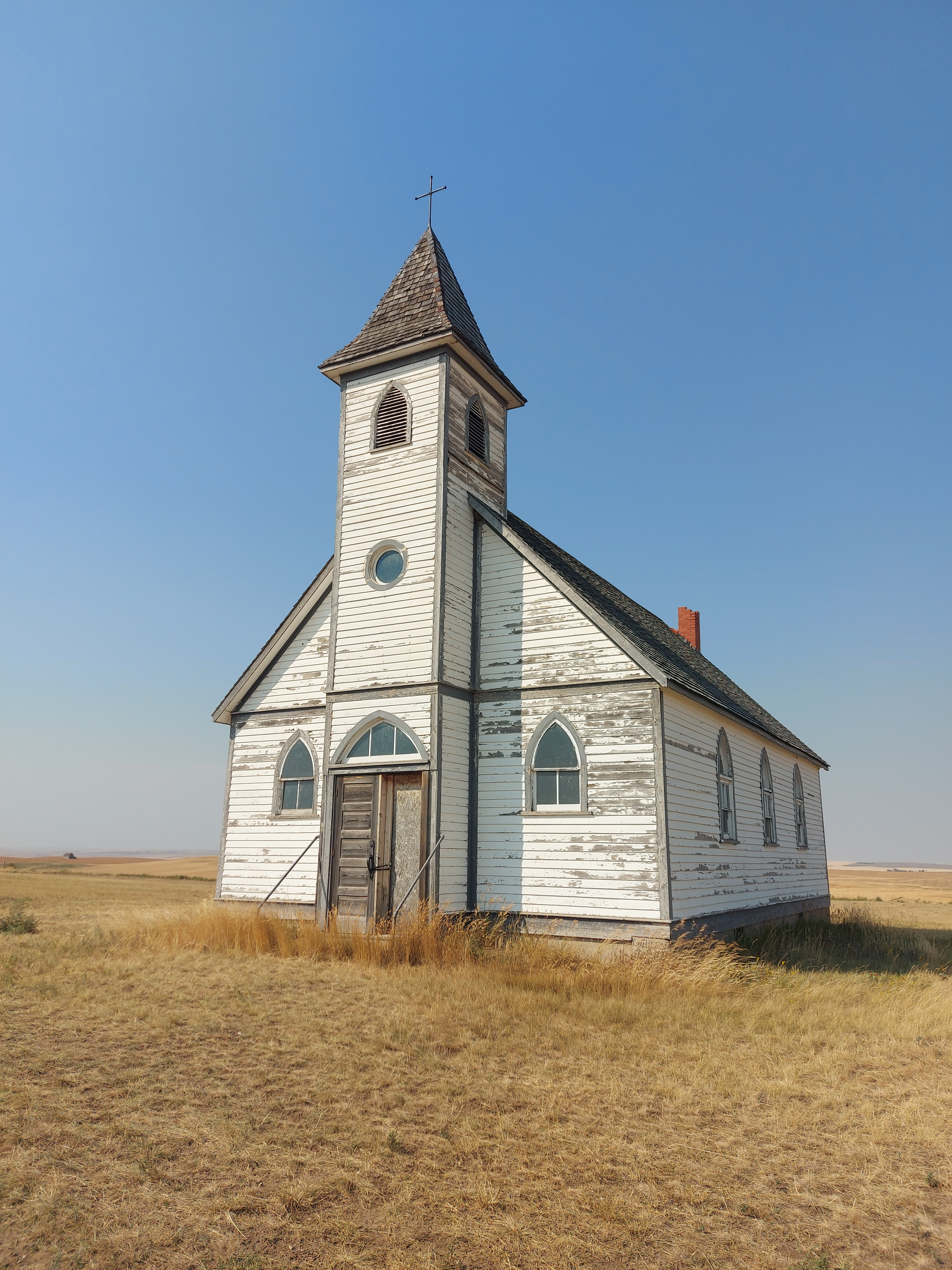
- Peace Lutheran Church

- Location of the RM of Stonehenge No. 73 in Saskatchewan
- Coordinates: 49.546°N 106.206°W
- Country: Canada
- Province: Saskatchewan
- Census division: 3
- SARM division: 2
- Federal riding: Cypress Hills—Grasslands
- Provincial riding: Wood River
- Formed: December 11, 1911

Government
  - Reeve: Chris Sinclair
  - Governing body: RM of Stonehenge No. 73 Council
  - Administrator: Tammy Franks
  - Office location: Limerick

Area (2016)
  - Land: 985.74 km^{2} (380.60 sq mi)

Population (2016)
  - Total: 319
  - Density: 0.3/km^{2} (0.78/sq mi)
- Time zone: CST
  - Summer (DST): CST
- Postal code: S0H 2P0
- Area codes: 306 and 639

The Rural Municipality of Stonehenge No. 73 (2016 population: 319) is a rural municipality (RM) in the Canadian province of Saskatchewan within Census Division No. 3 and SARM Division No. 2. It is located in the south-central portion of the province.

== History ==
The RM of Stonehenge No. 73 was incorporated as a rural municipality on December 11, 1911.

== Geography ==
=== Communities and localities ===
The following urban municipalities are surrounded by the RM.

Villages

- Limerick

The following unincorporated communities are within the RM.

Organized hamlets

- Congress

== Demographics ==
Population history (1981–2016)
Year	Pop.	±%
1981	701	—
1986	670	−4.4%
1991	659	−1.6%
1996	592	−10.2%
2001	545	−7.9%
2006	442	−18.9%
2011	403	−8.8%
2016	319	−20.8%
Source: Statistics Canada via Saskatchewan Bureau of Statistics

In the 2021 Census of Population conducted by Statistics Canada, the RM of Stonehenge No. 73 had a population of 385 living in 156 of its 173 total private dwellings, a change of 1.3% from its 2016 population of 380. With a land area of 956.43 km^{2} (369.28 sq mi), it had a population density of 0.4/km^{2} (1.0/sq mi) in 2021.

In the 2016 Census of Population, the RM of Stonehenge No. 73 recorded a population of 319 living in 136 of its 169 total private dwellings, a −20.8% change from its 2011 population of 403. With a land area of 985.74 km^{2} (380.60 sq mi), it had a population density of 0.3/km^{2} (0.8/sq mi) in 2016.

== Government ==
The RM of Stonehenge No. 73 is governed by an elected municipal council and an appointed administrator that meets on the second Monday of every month. The reeve of the RM is Chris Sinclair while its administrator is Tammy Franks. The RM's office is located in Limerick.

== Transportation ==
The RM is a part owner of the Fife Lake Railway.

== See also ==
- List of rural municipalities in Saskatchewan
