= St. Victor Petroglyphs Provincial Park =

Provincial park in Saskatchewan, Canada

St. Victor Petroglyphs Provincial Historic Park
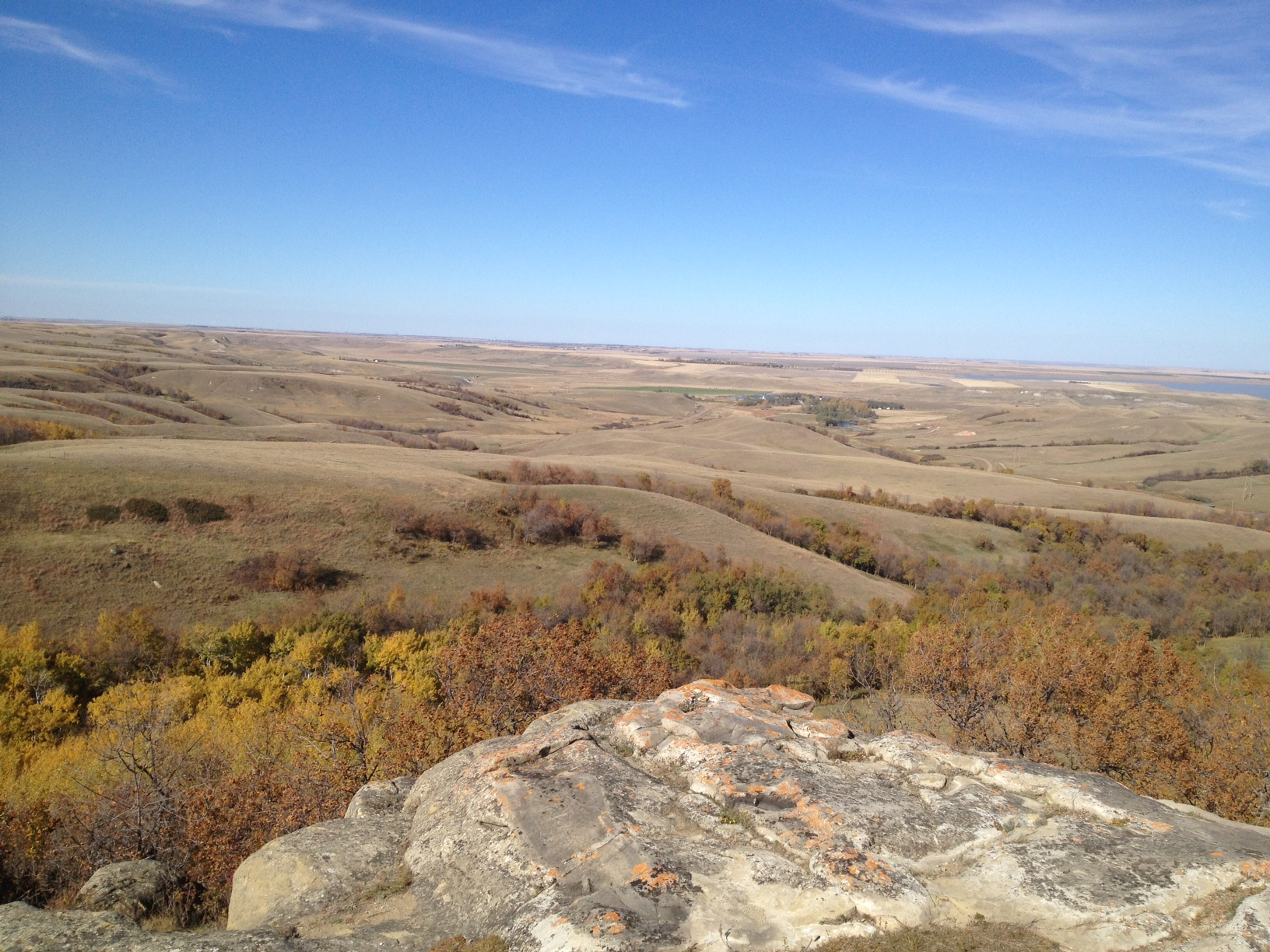
- View of the petroglyphs and countryside

- Location within Saskatchewan Location within Canada
- 49.4118°N 105.8712°W
- Location: RM of Willow Bunch No. 42, Saskatchewan, Canada

History
- Original use: Aboriginal sacred site

Site notes
- Current use: Historic site
- Governing body: Sask Parks
- Owner

National Historic Site of Canada
- Official name: St. Victor Petroglyphs Provincial Historic Park
- Designated: 1986

St. Victor Petroglyphs Provincial Historic Park is an historical provincial park in Saskatchewan, Canada. The park is located in the RM of Willow Bunch No. 42, about 2 kilometres (1.2 mi) south of St. Victor. The 3.9 ha (9.6-acre) park is situated on the northern slope of the Wood Mountain Upland on a cliff at the top of a partially wooded coulee. The Wood Mountain Hills are a plateau east of the Cypress Hills along the Missouri Coteau in the semi-arid Palliser's Triangle. The site was designated as an historic site in the 1960s and became a provincial park in 1986.

St. Victor Petroglyphs Provincial Historic Park features over 360 petroglyphs that have been estimated to have been carved between AD 200 and 1750. They are on a large sandstone outcrop and are the only known example of horizontal petroglyphs on the Canadian Prairies. They also represent the largest concentration of pre-contact rock art in Saskatchewan. Radiocarbon dating of two human bone samples excavated in the park found that one dated to AD 900 and the other to 120 BC. While the analysis does not directly date the petroglyphs, it shows that humans were present in the area as early as the second century BC.

== History ==
There is evidence that the petroglyphs were not carved all at one time but rather over a period of hundreds of years by different people as there are a few examples of carvings superimposed on carvings. It is not known exactly who carved them but this rock art is typically attributed to the people of the Siouan languages. There are carved animal tracks, animal and human figures, geometric shapes, and genitalia. "The association of vulva forms with cloven-hoofed animal tracks relates to Siouan mythological themes of fertility and the sacred relationship between women and bison". The petroglyphs were likely created as part of rituals and focused on productivity of game animals, curing, and vision-seeking.

== The petroglyphs today ==
First Nations today still consider the site sacred. The natural erosion of the sandstone is causing the petroglyphs to fade and the erosion of the cliff has caused a large piece of carved sandstone, bearing a dozen carvings, to break away. Different First Nations individuals and groups have expressed differing views regarding preservation of the carvings, including taking active measures, versus "letting nature take its course". The province has chosen the latter stance despite international conventions that encourage preservation of rock art for the education and enjoyment of future generations. To slow vandalism and wear and tear from foot traffic, the province has blocked access to the carvings by erecting a fence. Several interpretive plaques are located outside the fence. In the nearby community of St. Victor, the St. Victor Petroglyphs Interpretative Centre, established and operated by Friends of St. Victor Petroglyphs, presents professionally-prepared interpretive panels and other displays on the petroglyphs, and the Friends offer guided tours of the site. The main authoritative source on these petroglyphs is the book published by the Friends: St.Victor Petroglyphs: The Place of the Living Stone.

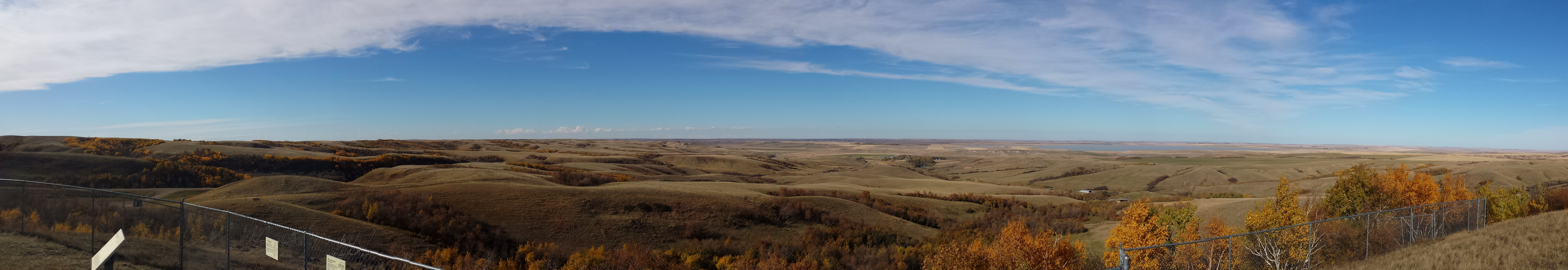
View at St. Victor Petroglyphs

== See also ==
- History of Saskatchewan
- List of National Historic Sites of Canada in Saskatchewan
- List of historic places in rural municipalities of Saskatchewan
- List of protected areas of Saskatchewan
- Tourism in Saskatchewan
