= Makwa River =

River in Saskatchewan, Canada

Makwa River Loon River
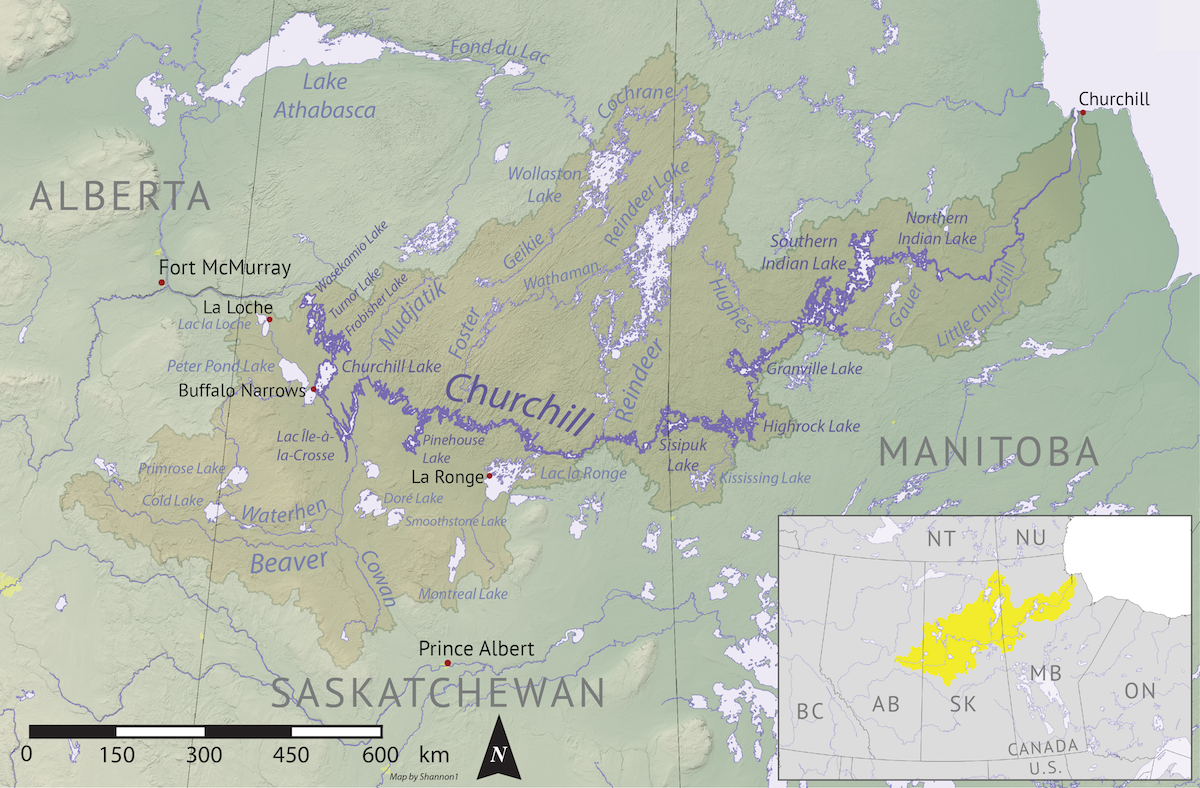
- Churchill River drainage basin

- Location of the mouth in Saskatchewan Makwa River (Canada)

Location
- Country: Canada
- Province: Saskatchewan

Physical characteristics
- Source: Makwa Lake
  - location: Makwa Lake Provincial Park
  - coordinates: 54.0801°N 109.2069°W
  - elevation: 525 m (1,722 ft)
- Mouth: Beaver River
  - location: RM of Meadow Lake No. 588
  - coordinates: 54.2451°N 108.7112°W
  - elevation: 475 m (1,558 ft)

Basin features
- River system: Churchill River
- Tributaries
  - right: Horsehead Creek

Makwa River (also called Loon River) is a river in the Canadian province of Saskatchewan in the transition zone between parkland and boreal forest. Makwa is Cree for 'Loon'. The upper reaches of the Makwa River's watershed reach just across the border into Alberta and includes lakes such as Hewett, Ministikwan, Makwa, and Jumbo.

== Description ==
Makwa River begins at the north-east corner of Makwa Lake in Makwa Lake Provincial Park and flows east then north-east to meet the Beaver River. Downstream water flows are controlled by Makwa Lake Control dam at the outflow point of Makwa Lake. The main tributary for Makwa Lake is Ministikwan Creek, which has its source at Ministikwan Lake. As Makwa River heads east, it is met by the south-flowing Horsehead Creek.

== Makwa Lake Control ==
Makwa Lake Control (54.0822°N 109.2012°W) was originally built as a timber dam in 1965. It is about 8.3 kilometres (5.2 mi) north-west of the village of Loon Lake at the outflow of Makwa Lake in Makwa Lake Provincial Park. In 2010, the dilapidated timber dam was replaced by a concrete one. The dam is 3.1 m (10 ft) high and has two radial gates and a riparian outlet. The original dam did not have a fish ladder but one was built for the 2010 concrete one. The dam regulates water levels on Makwa, Upper Makwa, Jumbo, and Little Jumbo Lakes. Access to the dam is from Highway 26.

== See also ==
- List of rivers of Saskatchewan
- Hudson Bay drainage basin
- Tourism in Saskatchewan
