= Battle of Loon Lake =

Historic battle in Saskatchewan, Canada

Coordinates: 54°2′26″N 109°18′34″W

- Part of the North-West Rebellion
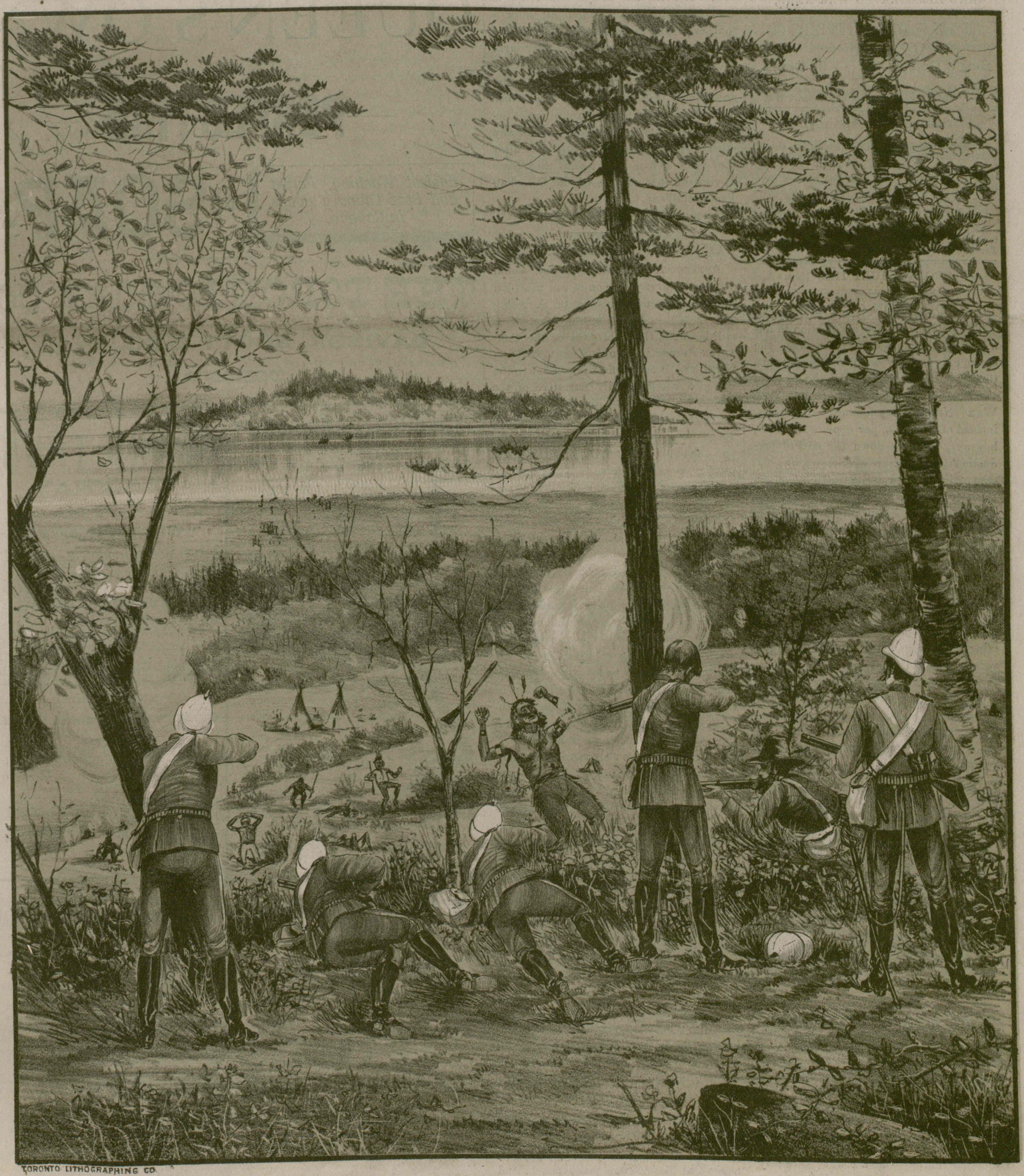
Date	June 3, 1885
Location	North of Frenchman Butte, Saskatchewan
Result	Canadian victory

Belligerents
Cree	Canada

Commanders and leaders
Big Bear; Wandering Spirit	Sam Steele; William Fury

Strength
150	75 militia

Casualties and losses
5–12 dead 75-100 wounded at Loon Lake and Frenchman Butte	7 wounded

National Historic Site of Canada
- Official name: Steele Narrows National Historic Site of Canada
- Designated: 1950

The District of Saskatchewan in 1885 (within the black diamonds) included the central section of Saskatchewan and extended into Alberta and Manitoba.

The Battle of Loon Lake, also known as the Battle of Steele Narrows, concluded the North-West Rebellion on June 3, 1885, and was the last battle fought on Canadian soil. It was fought in what was then the District of Saskatchewan of the North-West Territories, at what is now known as Steele Narrows at Makwa Lake, in Saskatchewan's Steele Narrows Provincial Park. Steele Narrows is a channel that separates Sanderson Bay from Makwa Lake.

Led by Major Sam Steele, a force of North-West Mounted Police, Alberta Mounted Rifles and Steele's Scouts (a body of mounted militia raised by Steele himself) caught up with and dispersed a band of Plains Cree warriors and their white and Métis hostages.

Cree scouts made a determined stand with what was left of their ammunition, but the body of the Cree column, realizing the hopelessness of their situation, released their prisoners and fled. The Cree casualties were four dead and dozens wounded.

Wandering Spirit, the war chief leading the Cree military campaign, surrendered to authorities at Fort Pitt. Big Bear, the aging peacetime chief of this band of Cree, eluded capture until July 2.

== Maps ==
- Military map of Loon Lake
- Military map of Loon Lake Ford
- Military map of Loon Lake Island and Muskeg

== Legacy ==
The site of the battle was designated as a National Historic Site of Canada in 1950.

In the spring of 2008, Tourism, Parks, Culture and Sport Minister Christine Tell proclaimed in Duck Lake, that "the 125th commemoration, in 2010, of the 1885 Northwest Resistance is an excellent opportunity to tell the story of the prairie Métis and First Nations peoples' struggle with Government forces and how it has shaped Canada today." The Battle of Loon Lake is commemorated today by interpretive signs placed by the Government of Saskatchewan and a plaque placed by the Historic Sites and Monuments Board of Canada.

The area of the battlefield was designated a provincial park in 1986. Steele Narrows Provincial Historic Park is an 88 ha (220 acres) park that conserves the lookout point of a Cree burial ground, has interpretive plaques, and a recreation area.
