= Quantock, Saskatchewan =

Community in Saskatchewan, Canada

Coordinates: 49°11′00″N 106°06′02″W

Quantock is an unincorporated area of Saskatchewan, Canada. According to a book titled Saskatchewan Ghost Towns, it was the location of a post office intended to serve isolated farmers and ranchers. Its mail route came from the nearby community of Assiniboia. It is near the banks of the Poplar River in the RM of Old Post No. 43. Access is from Highway 18.

== See also ==
- List of communities in Saskatchewan
