= Catholic Foundation of Manitoba =

The Catholic Foundation of Manitoba is a not-for-profit registered charity in Manitoba, Canada. It was established by an act of the Legislative Assembly of Manitoba in 1964, with the support of the province's Roman Catholic hierarchy.

The organization's stated mandate is to "[provide] the opportunity for individuals and organizations to establish permanent endowments in order to fund groups and organizations carrying out charitable and other works in the Catholic tradition".
