= Wood Mountain 160 =

Indian reserve in Saskatchewan, Canada

Coordinates: 49°19′36″N 106°26′35″W

- Indian reserve
- Wood Mountain Indian Reserve No. 160
- Location in Saskatchewan
- First Nation: Wood Mountain
- Country: Canada
- Province: Saskatchewan

Area
  - Total: 2,376.2 ha (5,872 acres)

Population (2016)
  - Total: 20
  - Density: 0.84/km^{2} (2.2/sq mi)

Wood Mountain 160 is an Indian reserve of the Wood Mountain Lakota First Nation in the Wood Mountain Hills of Saskatchewan. It is about 135 kilometres (84 mi) south-west of Moose Jaw. In the 2016 Canadian Census, it recorded a population of 20 living in 11 of its 14 total private dwellings.

== See also ==
- List of Indian reserves in Saskatchewan
