= Makwa Lake Provincial Park =

Provincial park in Saskatchewan, Canada

- Location within Saskatchewan Location within Canada
- Interactive map of Makwa Lake Provincial Park
- Location: Saskatchewan, Canada
- Nearest city: Loon Lake
- Coordinates: 54.0155°N 109.2006°W
- Area: 3,380 ha (8,400 acres)
- Established: 1986
- Governing body: Sask Parks

Makwa Lake Provincial Park is a recreational provincial park in the west-central region of the Canadian province of Saskatchewan in the transition zone between parkland and boreal forest. The park was established in 1986 and is centred around the lakes of Big Jumbo, Little Jumbo, and Makwa. Prior to its establishment, the park was a provincial recreation site. The main entrance to Makwa Lake Park is at the south-east corner of Makwa Lake about 3 kilometres (1.9 mi) west of the village of Loon Lake. Access is from Highway 699.

Makwa Lake Provincial Park is split into two sections, one on the north-eastern shore of Makwa Lake and the other covering most of the southern half of Big Jumbo and Little Jumbo Lakes. The section of park on Makwa Lake is accessed from Highway 26 and has the source of the Makwa River and Makwa Lake Control dam but has few other amenities or attractions. The section around the Jumbo Lakes has campgrounds, hiking trails, picnic areas, beaches, boat launches, and a golf course. There are a total of five lakes within the park's boundaries.

== Amenities and attractions ==
Makwa Lake Provincial Park has three separate campgrounds with a combined 260 campsites. All three campsites have beach access while the largest is Stabler Point Campground with over 200 campsites. Stabler Point Campground is located on Little Jumbo Lake and is well treed has a sewer-dump, showers, washrooms, and a picnic area. Also on Little Jumbo Lake is Jumbo Beach Campground. It is the smallest with 16 tenting only sites but it has beach access and a boat launch. Meewasin Beach Campground, with about 40 campsites, is located on Big Jumbo Lake. The campground has beach access, a boat launch, showers and washrooms, and potable water.

Just south of Meewasin Beach Campground, along the park's southern boundary, is a small lake called Exner Lake. In 1992, it was stocked with rainbow trout and, more recently, stocked with splake. A boat launch is located on its northern shore.

Other attractions in the park include several hiking trails, a 9-hole grass greens golf course, and a Bible camp. In the winter, there's ice fishing and cross-country skiing.

== Flora and fauna ==
The forests in the park consist of birch, aspen, and jack pine. Animals include black bears, foxes, deer, and a variety of birds. Fish found in the lakes include northern pike, walleye, yellow perch, rainbow trout, and tiger trout.

== See also ==
- List of protected areas of Saskatchewan
- Tourism in Saskatchewan
- Steele Narrows Provincial Park
