= Rural Municipality of Old Post No. 43 =

Rural municipality in Saskatchewan, Canada

Old Post No. 43
- Rural municipality
- Rural Municipality of Old Post No. 43

- Location of the RM of Old Post No. 43 in Saskatchewan
- Coordinates: 49.326°N 106.268°W
- Country: Canada
- Province: Saskatchewan
- Census division: 3
- SARM division: 2
- Federal riding: Cypress Hills—Grasslands
- Provincial riding: Wood River
- Formed: January 1, 1967

Government
  - Reeve: vacant
  - Governing body: RM of Old Post No. 43 Council
  - Administrator: Vickie Greffard
  - Office location: Wood Mountain

Area (2016)
  - Land: 1,757.5 km^{2} (678.6 sq mi)

Population (2021)
  - Total: 352
  - Density: 0.2/km^{2} (0.52/sq mi)
- Time zone: CST
  - Summer (DST): CST
- Postal code: S0H 4L0
- Area codes: 306 and 639

The Rural Municipality of Old Post No. 43 (2021 population: 352) is a rural municipality (RM) in the Canadian province of Saskatchewan within Census Division No. 3 and SARM Division No. 2. It is located in the southern portion of the province adjacent to the United States border, neighbouring Valley County and Daniels County in Montana.

== History ==
The RM of Old Post No. 43 incorporated as a rural municipality on January 1, 1967.

Heritage properties

There is one heritage building located within the RM.

- Elm Springs Roumanian Orthodox Church — Constructed in 1926, the church is in the Elma Springs area. Originally constructed by Romanian immigrants and originally called the Ascension of Our Lord Church it played an important role in the community. Today it is only used for a few services per year.

== Geography ==
=== Communities and localities ===
The following urban municipalities are surrounded by the RM.

Villages

- Wood Mountain

The following unincorporated communities are within the RM.

Localities

- Canopus
- Elm Springs
- Killdeer
- Lonesome Butte
- Macworth
- Quantock
- Strathallen
- West Poplar
- Willowvale

== Demographics ==
Population history (1971–2021)
Year	Pop.	±%
1971	1,103	—
1976	905	−18.0%
1981	838	−7.4%
1986	637	−24.0%
1991	628	−1.4%
1996	531	−15.4%
2001	475	−10.5%
2006	394	−17.1%
2011	395	+0.3%
2016	377	−4.6%
2021	352	−6.6%
Source: Statistics Canada via Saskatchewan Bureau of Statistics

In the 2021 Census of Population conducted by Statistics Canada, the RM of Old Post No. 43 had a population of 352 living in 128 of its 157 total private dwellings, a change of −6.6% from its 2016 population of 377. With a land area of 1,757.5 km^{2} (678.6 sq mi), it had a population density of 0.2/km^{2} (0.5/sq mi) in 2021.

In the 2016 Census of Population, the RM of Old Post No. 43 recorded a population of 377 living in 151 of its 171 total private dwellings, a −4.6% change from its 2011 population of 395. With a land area of 1,757 km^{2} (678 sq mi), it had a population density of 0.2/km^{2} (0.6/sq mi) in 2016.

== Attractions ==
- Wood Mountain Community Pool
- Wood Mountain Regional Park
- Wood Mountain Rodeo & Ranching Museum (located at the regional park)
- Wood Mountain Post Historic Park

Events

- Wood Mountain Stampede, located at Wood Mountain Regional Park, is oldest continuous annual rodeo in Canada. It has run since 1890.
- Wood Mountain Farmers Market
- Wood Mountain Trade Fair

== Government ==
The RM of Old Post No. 43 is governed by an elected municipal council and an appointed administrator that meets on the second Thursday of every month. The reeve position is vacant while the RM's administrator is Vickie Greffard. The RM's office is located in Wood Mountain.

== Transportation ==
The RM is a part owner of the Fife Lake Railway.

== See also ==
- List of rural municipalities in Saskatchewan
