= Makwa Lake =

Lake in Saskatchewan, Canada

- Loon Lake
- Location in Saskatchewan Makwa Lake (Canada)
- Location: RM of Loon Lake No. 561, Saskatchewan
- Coordinates: 54.0668°N 109.2507°W
- Part of: Churchill River drainage basin
- Primary inflows: Ministikwan Creek
- Primary outflows: Makwa River
- Basin countries: Canada
- Surface area: 3,186.4 ha (7,874 acres)
- Max. depth: 27.5 m (90 ft)
- Shore length^{1}: 67.9 km (42.2 mi)
- Surface elevation: 520 m (1,710 ft)
- Settlements: Loon Lake
- ^{1} Shore length is not a well-defined measure.

Makwa Lake, which is Cree for "Loon Lake", is a lake in the west-central region of the Canadian province of Saskatchewan in the transition zone between parkland and boreal forest. The Battle of Loon Lake, which was last battle of the North-West Rebellion, happened at Steele Narrows, a strait at the entrance to Sanderson Bay on Makwa Lake. The site is now part of Steele Narrows Provincial Park.

Makwa Lake is home to a section of Makwa Lake Provincial Park, two First Nations (Thunderchild and Makwa Sahgaiehcan), and two communities (Loon Lake and Pine Cove). Pine Cove and Loon Lake are along the eastern shore and accessed from Highway 26 while Highway 699 runs along the southern shore and provides access to both provincial parks. The two First Nations each have two Indian reserves at the lake: Thunderchild 115S, Thunderchild 115Z, Makwa Lake 129, and Makwa Lake 129B. At the lake's outflow, at the north-east corner, is a small dam called Makwa Lake Control that is used to control lake levels.

== Description ==
Makwa Lake is divided into two main bodies – one to the east and one to the west. Originally the sections were considered separate lakes with the western part being called 'Loon Lake'. They are separated by a shallow, marshy strait near where Ministikwan Creek enters the lake. The communities of Pine Cove and Loon Lake, Makwa River, and Makwa Lake Provincial Park are on the eastern side while Steele Narrows Provincial Park and Sanderson Bay are on the western side. Sanderson Bay is also referred to as Upper and Lower Tullibee Lake. Upper Makwa Lake is a narrow lake between the two main bodies of Makwa Lake and north of Jumbo Lake that drains into Sanderson Bay. Jumbo Lake flows into the eastern body of Makwa Lake via the smaller Little Jumbo Lake.

While several small creeks flow into Makwa Lake, Ministikwan Creek is the primary inflow. It begins from the west at Ministikwan Lake.

== Parks and recreation ==
Makwa Lake Provincial Park was created in 1986 and is located on the north-eastern shore of Makwa Lake and around the neighbouring Little Jumbo and Jumbo Lakes. The main entrance to the park is at the south-east corner of Makwa Lake and about 3 kilometres (1.9 mi) west of the village of Loon Lake. Steele Narrows Provincial Park is a small park located at Steele Narrows, which is the entrance to Sanderson Bay. The park is the site of the Battle of Loon Lake, which was not only the last battle of the North-West Rebellion but also the last battle fought on Canadian soil. The site is a National Historic Site of Canada and there are commemorative plaques, a picnic area, and a boat launch.

Both provincial parks are accessed from Highway 699.

== Fish species ==
Fish commonly found in Makwa Lake include northern pike, walleye, and yellow perch.

== See also ==
- List of lakes of Saskatchewan
- Tourism in Saskatchewan
- List of protected areas of Saskatchewan
