= Wood Mountain Lakota First Nation =

First Nations band government in Saskatchewan

- Band No. 388
- People: Lakota
- Treaty: Treaty 4
- Headquarters: Assiniboia
- Province: Saskatchewan

Land
- Other reserve: Wood Mountain 160
- Land area: 23.762 km^{2} (9.175 sq mi)

Population (2019)
- On reserve: 7
- Off reserve: 298
- Total population: 305

Government
- Chief: Ellen Lecaine

Tribal Council
- File Hills Qu'Appelle Tribal Council

Website
- woodmountainlakotafn.ca

The Wood Mountain First Nation (Lakota: Tatanka Iyutaka Lakota Oyate, also spelt as Tȟatȟáŋka Íyotake Lakȟóta Oyáte) is a Lakota First Nations band government in southern Saskatchewan, Canada. Led across the border by Sitting Bull, they are the only organized Lakota nation in Canada. Their reserve is located at Wood Mountain 160, near Grasslands National Park, although most members reside elsewhere.

== History ==
In the mid-1800s, nomadic Lakota people were active near the Canada–United States border. After Sitting Bull's victory at the Battle of the Little Bighorn, a number of Lakota fled reprisals by the U.S. Cavalry by camping in this area. Although Sitting Bull himself returned to the United States in 1881, Wood Mountain's 37 founding families remained in Canada. A temporary reserve was created for them on October 29, 1910, and recognized through an Order-in-Council on August 5, 1930, despite the Lakota never formally taking treaty. With most members remaining off reserve, the band declined in number, in part through marrying into the surrounding white community.
