= Saskatchewan Highway 34 =

Provincial highway in Saskatchewan, Canada

Highway 34
- Highway 34 highlighted in red
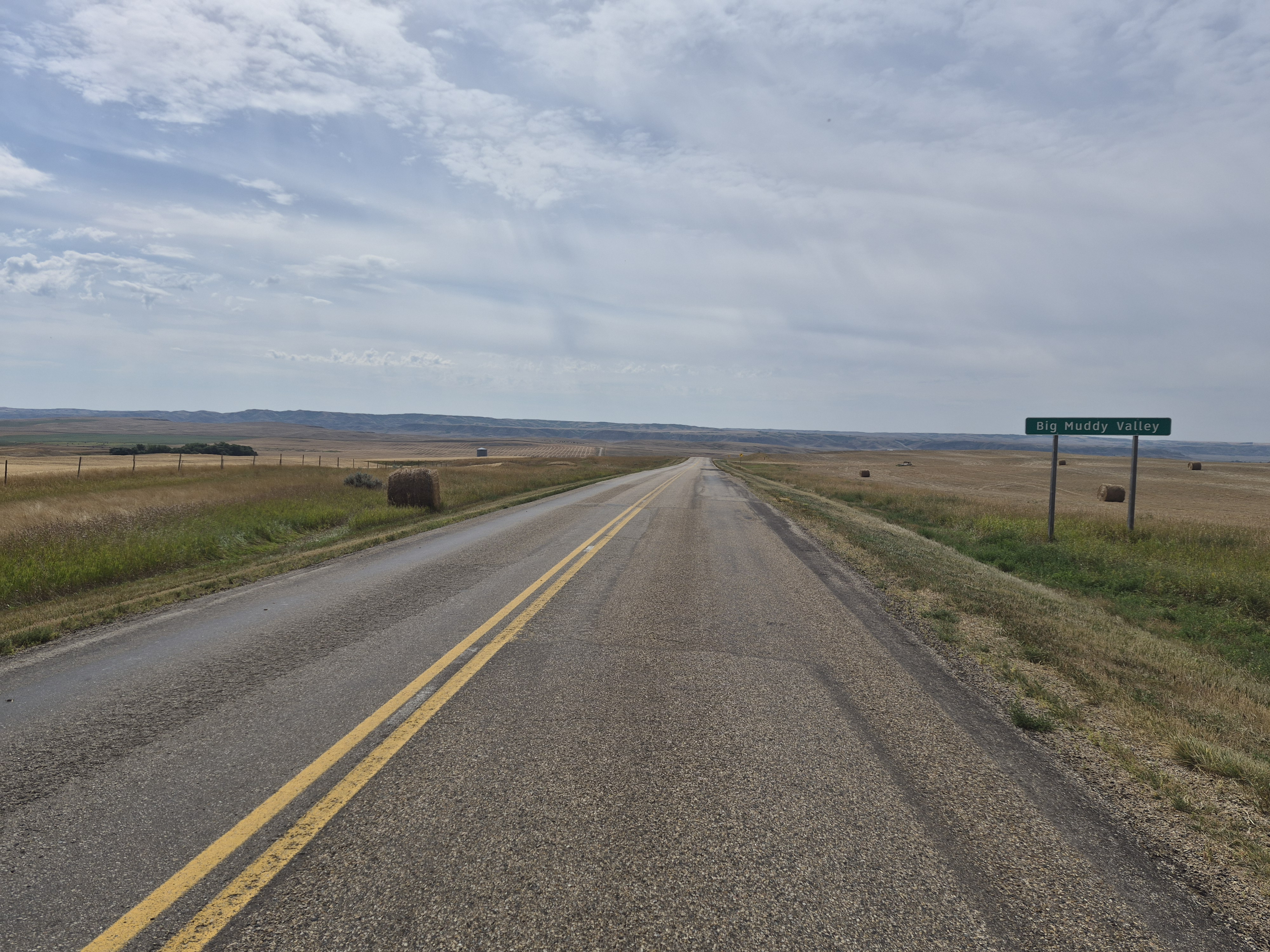
- Highway 34 descending into Big Muddy Valley

Route information
- Maintained by Ministry of Highways and Infrastructure
- Length: 62.3 km (38.7 mi)

Major junctions
- South end: S-511 at the U.S. border near Big Beaver; Port of Entry closed
- Highway 18 at Big Beaver
- North end: Highway 13 / Highway 334 west of Ogema

Location
- Country: Canada
- Province: Saskatchewan
- Rural municipalities: Happy Valley, Bengough, Key West

Highway system
- Provincial highways in Saskatchewan
← Highway 33	→ Highway 35

Highway 34 is a paved, undivided provincial highway in the Canadian province of Saskatchewan. It runs from Highway 13 about 16 kilometres (9.9 mi) west of Ogema south to the Canada–United States border. The highway used to connect to Montana Secondary Highway 511 at the Port of Big Beaver, however the port is now closed. Highway 34 is in the south-central part of Saskatchewan and travels through a geographical area of rugged badlands, rolling hills, and open prairie. It is about 62 kilometres (39 mi) long.

== Route description ==
Highway 34 begins at the now closed U.S. border crossing of Big Beaver. The Canadian government closed the port to northbound traffic in 2011 while the U.S. closed it to southbound traffic in 2013. From the U.S. border, Highway 34 heads north across West Beaver Creek en route to meet Highway 18 near Big Beaver. About 17 kilometres (11 mi) north of the intersection with Highway 18 is the access road to Castle Butte. From there, Highway 34 drops into and traverses the Big Muddy Valley. Coming out on the north side of the valley, the highway continues in a northerly direction where it meets Highway 705 about 5 kilometres (3 mi) south of Bengough. Highway 34 has a 6.4 kilometres (4 mi) concurrency with Highway 705 before it splits off to the east on the north side of Bengough. From that concurrency, Highway 34 heads straight north for another 16 kilometres (9.9 mi) until it ends at Highway 13. Highway 334 carries on north from the end of 34.

== Major attractions ==
Notable parks and other attractions accessible from Highway 34 include:

- Big Beaver Regional Park is a small park with camping and picnicking facilities at Big Beaver on the west side of Highway 34 near the intersection with Highway 18.
- Highway 34 passes through the Big Muddy Badlands, which is a 55-kilometre (34 mi) long, 3.2-kilometre (2.0 mi) wide, and 160-metre (520 ft) deep valley of erosion and sandstone along Big Muddy Creek. Big Muddy Lake is downstream along Big Muddy Creek and east of Highway 34. Castle Butte, an outcrop of sandstone and compressed clay that protrudes 60 metres (200 ft) above the flat prairie, is to the west of the highway.
- Bengough Regional Park is on the west side of Highway 34 adjacent to Bengough. The park has a campground, ball diamonds, horseshoe pitches, a cook shack, swimming pool, paddle pool and whirlpool, and a golf course.
- Willow Bunch Lake is to west of Highway 34.

== Major intersections ==
From south to north:

Rural municipality	Location	km	mi	Destinations	Notes
Happy Valley No. 10		0.0	0.0	S-511 (no access)	Port of entry permanently closed
Happy Valley No. 10		0.0	0.0	Canada–United States border at Port of Big Beaver	
Happy Valley No. 10	Big Beaver	10.3	6.4	Highway 18 – Coronach, Minton	
Bengough No. 40		39.9	24.8	Highway 705 west – Harptree	South end of Hwy 705 concurrency
Bengough No. 40	Bengough	46.4	28.8	Township Road 54 – Viceroy Highway 705 east – Colgate	North end of Hwy 705 concurrency
Key West No. 70		62.3	38.7	Highway 13 (Red Coat Trail) – Assiniboia, Weyburn Highway 334 north – Avonlea	
1.000 mi = 1.609 km; 1.000 km = 0.621 mi: Closed/former; Concurrency terminus

== See also ==
- Transportation in Saskatchewan
- Roads in Saskatchewan
