= Horizon, Saskatchewan =

Hamlet in Saskatchewan, Canada

- Unincorporated Community
- Horizon
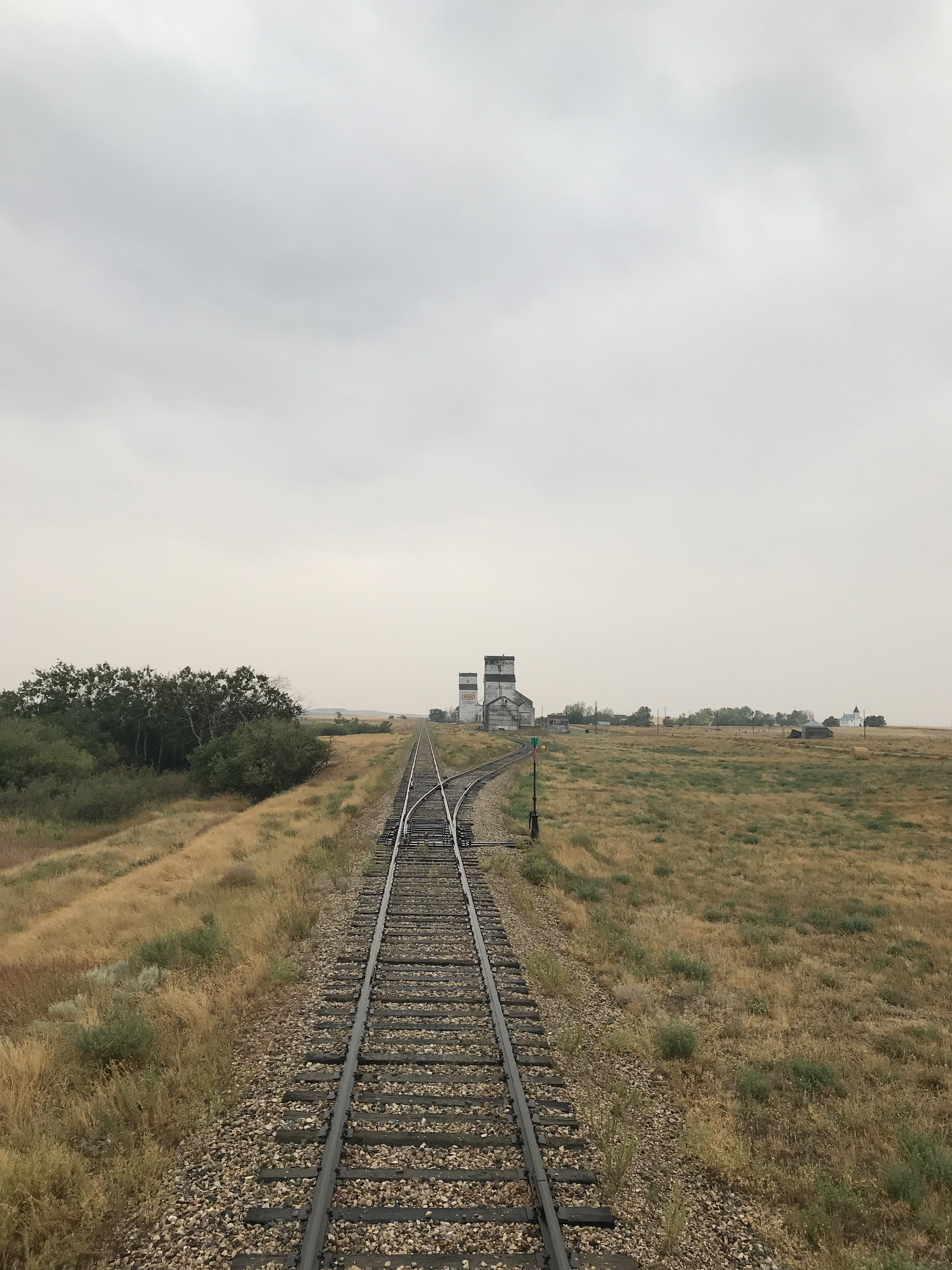

- Location of Horizon in Saskatchewan Horizon, Saskatchewan (Canada)
- Coordinates: 49.518°N 105.226°W
- Country: Canada
- Province: Saskatchewan
- Census division: 2
- Rural Municipality: Bengough No. 40
- Established: 1912
- Post office founded: 1912
- Postal code: S0C 1Y0
- Area code: (306)
- Railways: Red Coat Road and Rail
- Bodies of water: Channel Lake
- Highways: Highway 13

Horizon, located on the south side of Channel Lake, is a hamlet in the Rural Municipality of Bengough No. 40, Saskatchewan, Canada. It previously held the status of village until December 31, 1973. The hamlet is located 60 kilometres (37 mi) east of the town of Assiniboia on Highway 13.

== Demographics ==
Prior to December 31, 1973, Horizon was incorporated as a village, and was restructured as a hamlet under the jurisdiction of the RM of Bengough No. 40 on that date.

== History ==
The hamlet of Horizon was formed in 1912 with the coming of the Canadian Pacific Railway. In 1917, with a population of 57, an application was made to make the community a village.

The story is told that before the railroad went through the district two surveying parties were working in that vicinity, one for the Grand Trunk Pacific and the other for the Canadian Pacific Railway. At the spot where Horizon now stands these two parties came together. An argument followed. One of the surveyors made the remark "It looks as if we have come to the horizon". Out of this argument came the name for the village, later erected on that spot.

== Business ==
The very first business was a general store and post office, owned by Herbert Stanbridge in a building moved in from Moreland, Saskatchewan. This was quickly followed by a grocery store, clothing store, restaurant, boarding house, lumberyard, hardware store, pool room & barbershop, blacksmith, livery barn, farm implement dealer, photo studio, liquor store, and a mechanic. Today, there are no businesses in Horizon.

== Community organizations ==
The village had organized a very active Red Cross branch. Every year an annual school field day was held with twelve schools participating. The village had an active tennis club with about 25 members. In addition, the following community organizations existed in Horizon over the years:

- Horizon School No. 3129 was established in 1912 after an application was made to the Department of Education to form a school division to service the 26 school age children who lived within a five-mile radius of Horizon. Eventually, a high school became necessary and so an addition was built onto the school, creating a two-room school for grades 1-10. As time went on, fewer and fewer students attended the school. At first one room was closed, then the other in 1966. Students were bused to Bengough and the school was eventually sold and relocated out of the community.
- Horizon 4H Calf Club was established in 1945 by Charlie Ribey. Children from several surrounding school districts were members. An annual event called Achievement Days was held where participants showed off their horse racing and jumping skills. The club continued until 1950.
- Horizon 4H Grain Club was established in 1938 by Jack Johnston and became a Beef Club around 1945.

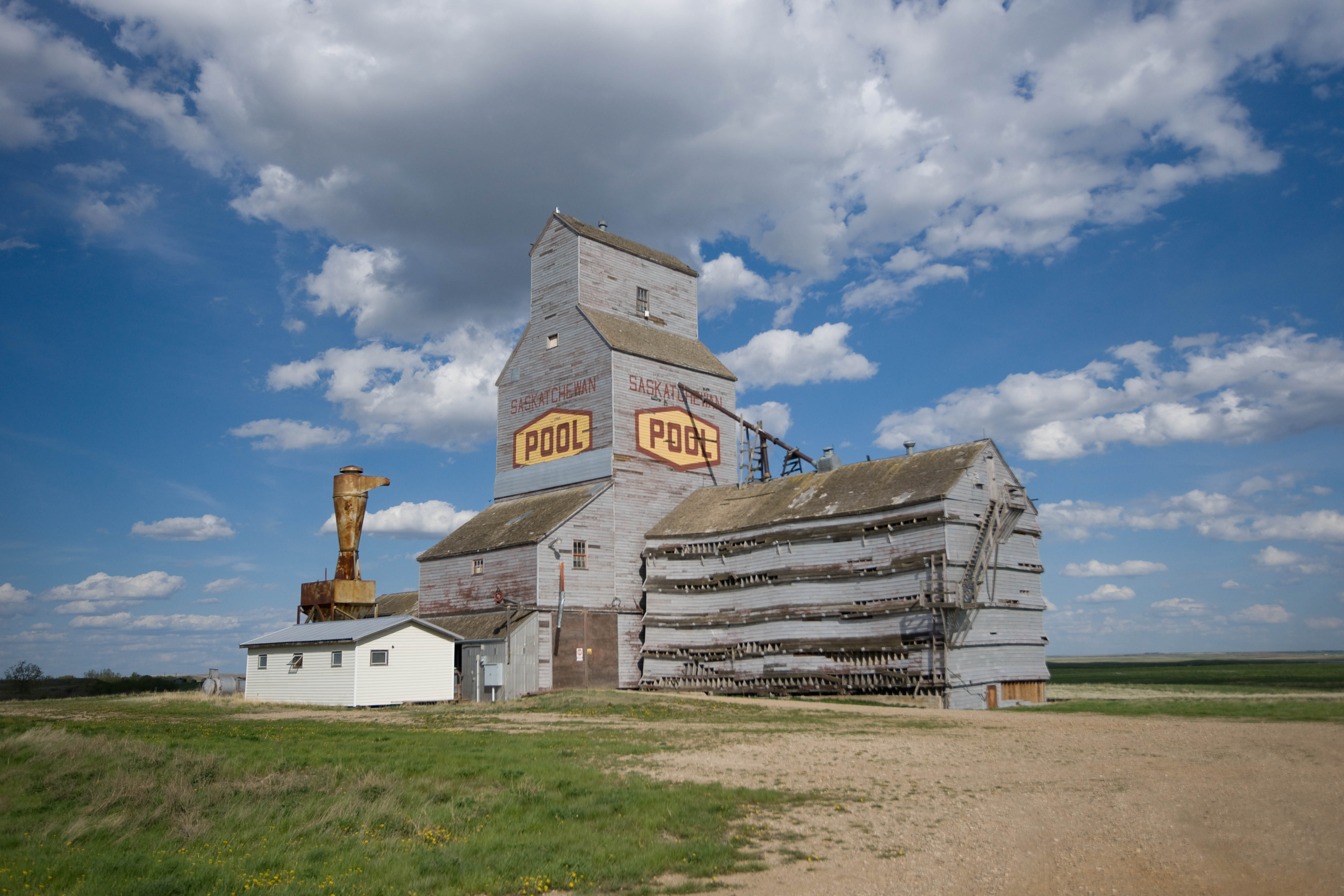
Horizon, Saskatchewan Elevator

- Horizon Homemakers' Club
- Recreation Association
- Horizon Ball Club
- Horizon Poultry Pool
- Horizon Wheat Pool Committee was formed in 1942.
- St. Cunegunda Church was a Catholic church built in 1928 (closed in 1991) followed by a rectory in 1929. Prior to that, service was held in the home of several parishioners and later in a hall built in 1915. The first priest was Father Mollard who drove from Weyburn by horse and buggy until the railway came to Horizon. The St. Cunegunda Roman Catholic Cemetery was established in 1914 abutting the Horizon Protestant Cemetery which itself was established in 1928. The former church is now called the Horizon Community Church Centre.
- Altar Society was formed in 1928 but was later dissolved and the Viceroy — Horizon Catholic Women's League took its place.

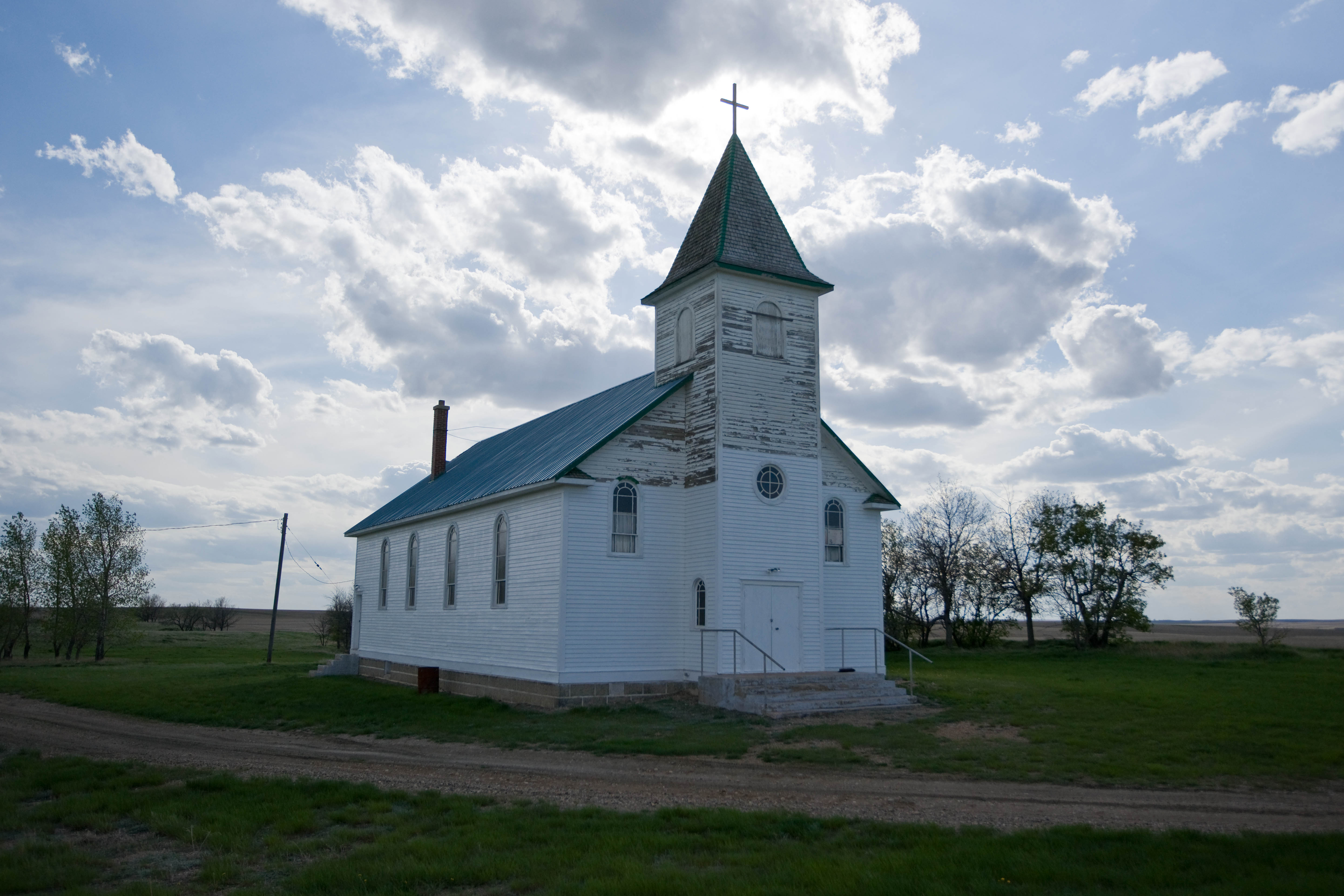
Horizon, Saskatchewan Church

== Transportation ==
In homesteading days, the Yellowgrass Trail ran through Horizon, taking horse and wagon traffic further west. Today, the community sits beside Highway 13, also called the Redcoat Trail and the Ghost Town Trail.

Horizon is also serviced by a former Canadian Pacific Railway branch. That rail line first came through in 1912. The first train station in Horizon was made out of a rail box car before a dedicated building was moved in from Forward. The CPR also built water tanks for the steam locomotives that were supplied with water from springs and wells dug south of the community.

In 1996 the CPR line was abandoned. Three years later, a group of local farmers formed the Red Coat Road and Rail and purchased part of the branch line and a number of elevators, consisting of about 115 km of track between Pangman and Assiniboia. Since then, the Great Western Railway has been contracted to operate the line on behalf of the Red Coat Road & Rail.

Originally, there were three grain elevators in Horizon; North Star, Ogilvie Flour Mill and the Federal Grain Company (built in 1922). Today, only two grain elevators remain. A former Saskatchewan Wheat Pool (built in 1953) elevator and the original Federal grain elevator still stand. The Federal elevator has been recognized as a municipal heritage property. The elevator was purchased by the Saskatchewan Wheat Pool in 1972 who operated it until 1996 when the CPR branch line was abandoned. The elevator was later bought by the Red Coat Road and Rail in 1999.

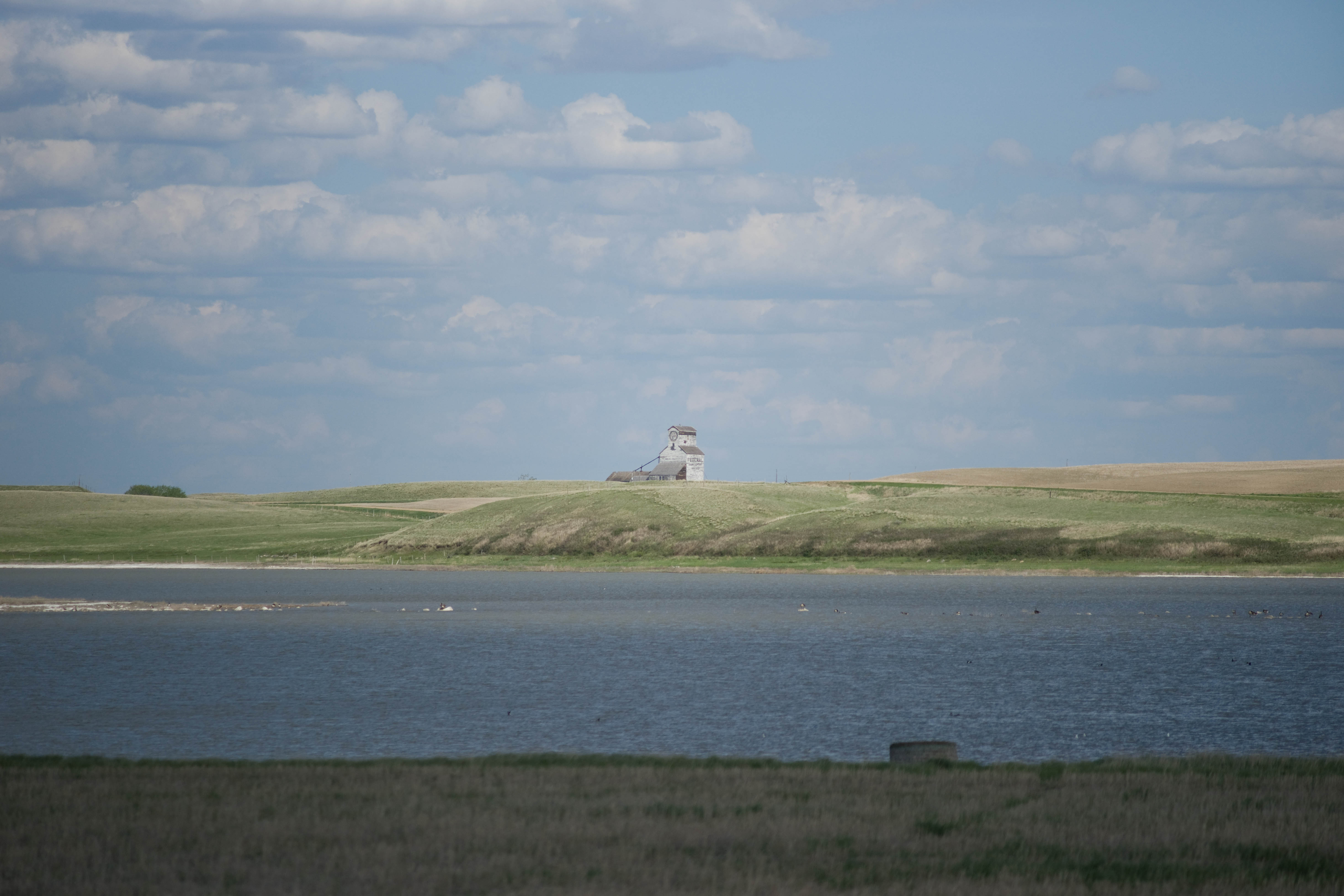
Horizon, Saskatchewan from Channel Lake

Today, a tourist railway, the Southern Prairie Railway, operates along the line and tours of the elevator in Horizon are available.

== Natural disasters ==
Over the years, Horizon was the site of several natural disasters, including:

- A large prairie fire in 1915
- A tornado in 1949
- The Great Depression from 1929-1939
- A devastating army worm infestation in 1937

== Popular culture ==
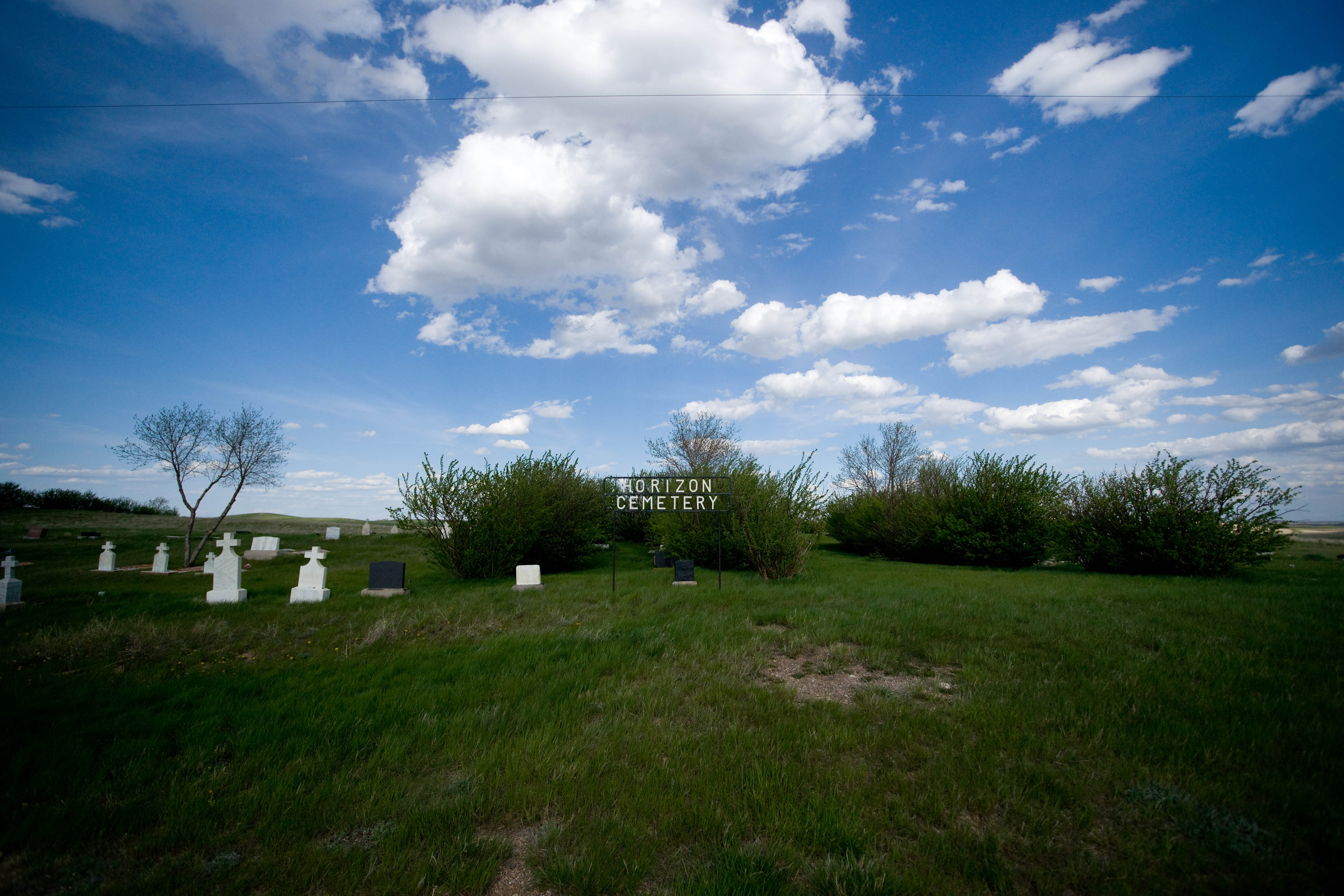
Horizon, Saskatchewan Cemetery

The novel A Garden in the Wind (1975) by Gabrielle Roy and the film based on it, Where Will You Go Sam Lee Wong?, are set in the town. The Sinclair Ross novel As for Me and My House (1941) is also set in the town.

== See also ==
- List of communities in Saskatchewan
