= Big Muddy =

Big Muddy may refer to:

== Places ==
- Big Muddy, Wyoming, U.S.
- Big Muddy Badlands, Saskatchewan, Canada, and Montana, U.S.

== Waterways ==
- Big Muddy Creek (Missouri River tributary), Saskatchewan, Canada, and Montana, U.S.
- Big Muddy Creek (East Fork Grand River tributary), a stream in Missouri
- Big Muddy Creek (Grand River tributary), a stream in Missouri
- Missouri River, nicknamed "Big Muddy"
- Mississippi River, nicknamed "The Big Muddy"
- Big Muddy River, Illinois, U.S.
- Big Muddy Creek (New Zealand), near the Upper Nihotupu Reservoir
- Big Muddy Lake, a lake in Saskatchewan

== Other uses ==
- Big Muddy (film), a 2015 Canadian crime drama
- Big Muddy National Fish and Wildlife Refuge, along the Missouri River, U.S.
- Big Muddy oil field, Wyoming, U.S.
- Big Muddy Records, an independent American music record label
- Big Muddy River Correctional Center, in Ina, Jefferson County, Illinois
- Weyburn-Big Muddy, an electoral district in Saskatchewan, Canada
- "Big Muddy", a song by Bruce Springsteen from the 1992 album Lucky Town

== See also ==
- "Waist Deep in the Big Muddy", a 1967 anti-war song by Pete Seeger
