= Bures, Saskatchewan =

Locality in Saskatchewan, Canada

Coordinates: 49.688°N 104.910°W

Bures is a locality in Key West Rural Municipality No. 70 in the province of Saskatchewan, Canada. Located 3 east of highway 623 on Range Road 221, approximately 15 km north of the town of Ogema.

== History ==
Bures is located at SW-36-8-22 W2M was founded predominantly by Scandinavian settlers in 1933. The community was named by Mr. C.P. Ennals who originally came from Bures, Suffolk, England.

A grain elevator was built in 1925 next to the railway, by 1933 the community had a post office, general store operated by Mr. L.B. Quinn. In 1940 Bures Co-op was incorporated, later moving to Ogema in 1954.

Bures School was located 1.5 km south of the community at 26-8-22 W2M opening in 1911, E.A. Kilpatrick was the first teacher. The school was closed in 1957 and the store and post office in 1967.

== Notable residents ==
- Earl McCready, Canadian freestyle sport wrestler who competed in the 1928 Summer Olympics, residing in Bures for a short time.

== See also ==
- List of communities in Saskatchewan
