= Rural Municipality of Bengough No. 40 =

Rural municipality in Saskatchewan, Canada

Bengough No. 40
- Rural municipality
- Rural Municipality of Bengough No. 40
- Motto: Big Muddy Country
- Location of the RM of Bengough No. 40 in Saskatchewan
- Coordinates: 49.401°N 105.160°W
- Country: Canada
- Province: Saskatchewan
- Census division: 2
- SARM division: 2
- Federal riding: Souris—Moose Mountain
- Provincial riding: Weyburn-Big Muddy; Wood River
- Formed: January 1, 1913

Government
  - Reeve: Eugene Hoffart
  - Governing body: RM of Bengough No. 40 Council
  - Administrator: Lara Hazen
  - Office location: Bengough

Area (2016)
  - Land: 1,036.91 km^{2} (400.35 sq mi)

Population (2016)
  - Total: 281
  - Density: 0.3/km^{2} (0.78/sq mi)
- Time zone: CST
  - Summer (DST): CST
- Postal code: S0C 0K0
- Area codes: 306 and 639

The Rural Municipality of Bengough No. 40 (2016 population: 281) is a rural municipality (RM) in the Canadian province of Saskatchewan within Census Division No. 2 and SARM Division No. 2. It is located in the southeast portion of the province.

== History ==
The RM of Bengough No. 40 incorporated as a rural municipality on January 1, 1913.

Heritage properties

There are three historic properties within the RM.

- Horizon Community Church Centre - Constructed in 1928, as the St. Cunegunda Roman Catholic Church in the then town of Horizon, Saskatchewan, approximately thirty kilometres west of Ogema, Saskatchewan.
- Horizon Federal Elevator - Constructed in 1922 in the town of Horizon, the grain elevator was in use until 1996 when the line was abandoned. A group of local farmer purchased the line and grain elevator as part of the Red Coat Road and Rail Ltd.
- Saskatchewan Wheat Pool Elevator - Constructed in 1953 in the town of Horizon, the grain elevator is still in use.

== Geography ==
=== Communities and localities ===
The following urban municipalities are surrounded by the RM.

Towns

- Bengough

The following unincorporated communities are located within the RM.

Localities

- Harptree
- Horizon, (dissolved as a village, December 31, 1973)
- Roncott
- Ritchie

== Demographics ==
Population history (1981–2016)
Year	Pop.	±%
1981	574	—
1986	507	−11.7%
1991	467	−7.9%
1996	405	−13.3%
2001	382	−5.7%
2006	337	−11.8%
2011	329	−2.4%
2016	281	−14.6%
Source: Statistics Canada via Saskatchewan Bureau of Statistics

In the 2021 Census of Population conducted by Statistics Canada, the RM of Bengough No. 40 had a population of 305 living in 116 of its 133 total private dwellings, a change of 8.5% from its 2016 population of 281. With a land area of 1,008.64 km^{2} (389.44 sq mi), it had a population density of 0.3/km^{2} (0.8/sq mi) in 2021.

In the 2016 Census of Population, the RM of Bengough No. 40 recorded a population of 281 living in 111 of its 136 total private dwellings, a −14.6% change from its 2011 population of 329. With a land area of 1,036.91 km^{2} (400.35 sq mi), it had a population density of 0.3/km^{2} (0.7/sq mi) in 2016.

== Government ==
The RM of Bengough No. 40 is governed by an elected municipal council and an appointed administrator that meets on the second Thursday of every month. The reeve of the RM is Eugene Hoffart while its administrator is Lara Hazen. The RM's office is located in Bengough.
