= Arleene Johnson =

Canadian baseball player

- Third base / Shortstop
- Born: January 1, 1924; Ogema, Saskatchewan, Canada
- Died: March 14, 2017 (aged 93); Regina, Saskatchewan, Canada
- Batted: Right Threw: Right

Teams
- Fort Wayne Daisies (1945); Muskegon Lassies (1946–1948); Fort Wayne Daisies (1948)

Career highlights and awards
- Three postseason appearances (1945, 1947–1948); Three-time best season fielding average at third base (1946–1948); Women in Baseball – AAGPBL Permanent Display at the Baseball Hall of Fame and Museum (since 1988)

Member of the Canadian

Baseball Hall of Fame
- Induction: 2025

Arleene Johnson Noga (January 1, 1924 – March 14, 2017) was a Canadian infielder who played from 1945 through 1948 in the All-American Girls Professional Baseball League (AAGPBL). Listed at 5 feet 4 inches, 137 lb., she batted and threw right-handed. Johnson was one of the 68 players born in Canada to join the All-American Girls Professional Baseball League in its twelve-year history.

== Early life ==
Born in Ogema, Saskatchewan, Johnson grew up on a farm and graduated at Ogema High School before moving to Regina, capital city of Saskatchewan, in search of stable employment. She joined the workforce in 1944 while playing in the Ladies Intercity Softball Senior A League.

== Baseball and softball career ==
Johnson entered the AAGPBL in 1945 with the Fort Wayne Daisies, playing for them one year before joining the Muskegon Lassies for two and a half years (1946–1948) and returning to Fort Wayne (1948). She divided her playing time between third base and shortstop, and made three trips to the playoffs.

Best known for her fielding abilities, Johnson was the top fielder at third base for three consecutive years, compiling a .928 fielding average in 1946, .942 in 1947 to set a single-season record, and .933 in 1948. Her .942 mark was still intact until 1952, when Ernestine Petras of the Battle Creek Belles recorded a .965 average.

Following her AAGPBL career, Johnson played organized softball in Regina from 1949 to 1979. In that period, she was member of nine provincial softball championship teams and helped them win five Western Canada championship titles. She also was named Most Valuable Player twice, was the league batting champion twice, and made the first All-Star team. In addition, she served as player-coach, assistant coach, and coach in latter years of participation.

== Personal life ==
Johnson married Ron Noga in 1963. The couple raised two children, Carol Lee and Robert, and had six grandchildren. She was widowed in 1994.

A vigorous grandmother, she served twelve years on the Board of Directors of the AAGPBL Players Association, and was involved in baseball clinics for girls with the Saskatchewan Baseball Association (1998–1999) and for Major League Baseball in the City of Halifax (1999).

Johnson has been widely recognized for her playing and coaching skills and by opening doors for women in sports. She is part of Women in Baseball, a permanent display based at the Baseball Hall of Fame and Museum in Cooperstown, New York, which was unveiled in 1988 to honor the entire AAGPBL rather than individual baseball personalities.

== Later life ==
In 1988, she gained induction into the Saskatchewan Baseball Hall of Fame and Museum and was inducted in the Saskatchewan Sports Hall of Fame and Museum in 1989. In addition, she was honoured in her home town of Ogema, when the Sports Complex of the city was declared a municipal heritage property and the historical grandstand in the fairgrounds was dedicated as the Arleene Johnson-Noga Grandstand.

In 1998, Johnson and all Canadian AAGPBL players gained honorary induction into the Canadian Baseball Hall of Fame. She also was inducted in the Regina Sports Hall of Fame in 2004 as a member of the 1954 Regina Govins. The same year, she was recognized by SASK Baseball for her dedication in building and promoting amateur baseball in Saskatchewan.

Johnson died on March 14, 2017, at the age of 93.

== Career statistics ==
Batting

GP	AB	R	H	2B	3B	HR	RBI	SB	TB	BB	SO	BA	OBP	SLG
354	1119	91	183	14	13	3	103	123	232	117	104	.164	.240	.207

Fielding

GP	PO	A	E	TC	DP	FA
343	465	870	95	1430	50	.934
