= Dahinda, Saskatchewan =

Coordinates: 49.732°N 105.108°W

Dahinda is an unincorporated community in Key West Rural Municipality No. 70 in the province of Saskatchewan, Canada. It is located at the intersection of Township Road 82 and Range Road 233, approximately 9 km east of Kayville.

== See also ==
- List of communities in Saskatchewan
- Lists of Canadian tornadoes and tornado outbreaks
