= Big Muddy Lake =

Lake in Saskatchewan, Canada

- Location in Saskatchewan Big Muddy Lake (Canada)
- Location: RM of Happy Valley No. 10 and RM of Surprise Valley No. 9, Saskatchewan
- Coordinates: 49.1501°N 104.8505°W
- Type: Salt lake
- Part of: Missouri River drainage basin
- Primary outflows: Big Muddy Creek
- Basin countries: Canada
- Shore length^{1}: 75 km (47 mi)
- Surface elevation: 659 m (2,162 ft)
- Islands: McKell Island; Appleby Island
- Settlements: None
- ^{1} Shore length is not a well-defined measure.

Big Muddy Lake is a shallow salt lake in the Canadian province of Saskatchewan. It is in the Big Muddy Badlands of the southern part of the province in the RMs of Happy Valley No. 10 and Surprise Valley No. 9. There are no communities, public roads, nor any facilities at the lake. The closest communities are Bengough, Minton, and Big Beaver, while the closest highways are 6 and 18. The Canada–United States border and the state of Montana are 12 kilometres (7.5 mi) south of the lake. The lake and much of the surrounding landscape is protected as an Important Bird Area (IBA) of Canada.

== Description ==
Big Muddy Lake sits in the Big Muddy Valley of the Big Muddy Badlands 140 metres (460 ft) below the surrounding landscape. The valley and badlands were formed over 12,000 years ago near the end of the last ice age with a glacial lake outburst flood from a pre-historic glacial lake located at present-day Old Wives Lake. From the southern shore, Big Muddy Creek flows out and to the south. It is a tributary of the Missouri River.

== Important Bird Area ==
Big Muddy Lake is part of Big Muddy Lake (and surroundings) (SK 018) Important Bird Area (IBA) of Canada. The protected area encompasses 20,000 ha (49,000 acres) of the lake and surrounding land. Part of the western shore of the lake is bordered by co-operative pasture lands while all of the eastern half, as well as a few other small sections, are designated as a critical piping plover habitat. Through the provincial Wildlife Habitat Protection Act, this designation protects the shoreline to the high water mark from development. The piping plover "is considered near threatened on a global scale and has been designated as endangered in Canada". In 2016, the most recent survey at Big Muddy Lake had five pairs and 14 total piping plovers observed.

Other birds found at the lake include golden eagles, prairie falcons, turkey vultures, ferruginous hawks, violet-green swallows, rock wrens, veeries, ovenbirds, Baltimore orioles, spotted towhees, and burrowing owls. The endangered sage thrasher has been observed once at the lake during breeding season.

Notable reptiles include the eastern yellow-bellied racer and the smooth green snake. The plants found in the IBA that are uncommon for southern Saskatchewan include the purple cliff brake, linear-leaved umbrellawort, and Oregon cliff fern.

== See also ==
- List of lakes of Saskatchewan
- List of protected areas of Saskatchewan
