= Rural Municipality of Happy Valley No. 10 =

Rural municipality in Saskatchewan, Canada

Happy Valley No. 10
- Rural municipality
- Rural Municipality of Happy Valley No. 10

- Location of the RM of Happy Valley No. 10 in Saskatchewan
- Coordinates: 49.130°N 105.018°W
- Country: Canada
- Province: Saskatchewan
- Census division: 2
- SARM division: 2
- Federal riding: Souris—Moose Mountain
- Provincial riding: Weyburn-Big Muddy
- Formed: January 1, 1913

Government
  - Reeve: Rodney Sjogren
  - Governing body: RM of Happy Valley No. 10 Council
  - Administrator: Leanne Totton
  - Office location: Big Beaver

Area (2016)
  - Land: 812.74 km^{2} (313.80 sq mi)

Population (2016)
  - Total: 139
  - Density: 0.2/km^{2} (0.52/sq mi)
- Time zone: CST
  - Summer (DST): CST
- Postal code: S0H 0G0
- Area codes: 306 and 639

The Rural Municipality of Happy Valley No. 10 (2016 population: 139) is a rural municipality (RM) in the Canadian province of Saskatchewan within Census Division No. 2 and SARM Division No. 2. Located in the southeast portion of the province, it is adjacent to the United States border, neighbouring Daniels County and Sheridan County in Montana.

== History ==
The RM of Happy Valley No. 10 incorporated as a rural municipality on January 1, 1913.

== Geography ==
=== Communities and localities ===
The following unincorporated communities are within the RM.

Organized hamlets

- Big Beaver

Localities

- Big Muddy
- Palsley Brook

== Canada's Historic Places ==
There are three sites on Canadian Register of Historic Places in the RM:

- Sam Kelly Sites
- Buffalo Effigy
- Paisley Brook School

== Demographics ==
Population history (1981–2016)
Year	Pop.	±%
1981	562	—
1986	517	−8.0%
1991	457	−11.6%
1996	432	−5.5%
2001	363	−16.0%
2006	174	−52.1%
2011	148	−14.9%
2016	139	−6.1%
Source: Statistics Canada via Saskatchewan Bureau of Statistics

In the 2021 Census of Population conducted by Statistics Canada, the RM of Happy Valley No. 10 had a population of 125 living in 54 of its 70 total private dwellings, a change of −10.1% from its 2016 population of 139. With a land area of 806.93 km^{2} (311.56 sq mi), it had a population density of 0.2/km^{2} (0.4/sq mi) in 2021.

In the 2016 Census of Population, the RM of Happy Valley No. 10 recorded a population of 139 living in 55 of its 67 total private dwellings, a −6.1% change from its 2011 population of 148. With a land area of 812.74 km^{2} (313.80 sq mi), it had a population density of 0.2/km^{2} (0.4/sq mi) in 2016.

== Government ==
The RM of Happy Valley No. 10 is governed by an elected municipal council and an appointed administrator that meets on the second Tuesday of every month. The reeve of the RM is Rodney Sjogren while its administrator is Leanne Totton. The RM's office is located in Big Beaver.

== See also ==
- List of rural municipalities in Saskatchewan
