= Rural Municipality of Key West No. 70 =

Rural municipality in Saskatchewan, Canada

Key West No. 70
- Rural municipality
- Rural Municipality of Key West No. 70
- Location of the RM of Key West No. 70 in Saskatchewan
- Coordinates: 49.650°N 105.028°W
- Country: Canada
- Province: Saskatchewan
- Census division: 2
- SARM division: 2
- Federal riding: Souris—Moose Mountain
- Provincial riding: Weyburn-Big Muddy
- Formed: December 12, 1910

Government
  - Reeve: Zane McKerricher
  - Governing body: RM of Key West No. 70 Council
  - Administrator: Yvonne Johnston
  - Office location: Ogema

Area (2016)
  - Land: 825.26 km^{2} (318.63 sq mi)

Population (2016)
  - Total: 255
  - Density: 0.3/km^{2} (0.78/sq mi)
- Time zone: CST
  - Summer (DST): CST
- Postal code: S0C 1Y0
- Area codes: 306 and 639

The Rural Municipality of Key West No. 70 (2016 population: 255) is a rural municipality (RM) in the Canadian province of Saskatchewan within Census Division No. 2 and SARM Division No. 2. It is located in the southwest portion of the province.

== History ==
The RM of Key West No. 70 incorporated as a rural municipality on December 12, 1910. The municipality had a post office from 1908 to 1926. It was named for Key West, Florida.

== Geography ==
=== Communities and localities ===
The following urban municipalities are surrounded by the RM.

Towns

- Ogema

The following unincorporated communities are within the RM.

Localities

- Bures
- Dahinda
- Edgeworth
- Glasnevin
- Kayville
- Key West
- Querrin

The RM also surrounds a portion of the Piapot Cree First Nation 75H.

== Demographics ==
Population history (1981–2016)
Year	Pop.	±%
1981	673	—
1986	600	−10.8%
1991	514	−14.3%
1996	470	−8.6%
2001	385	−18.1%
2006	309	−19.7%
2011	287	−7.1%
2016	255	−11.1%
Source: Statistics Canada via Saskatchewan Bureau of Statistics

In the 2021 Census of Population conducted by Statistics Canada, the RM of Key West No. 70 had a population of 251 living in 108 of its 133 total private dwellings, a change of −1.6% from its 2016 population of 255. With a land area of 786.65 km^{2} (303.73 sq mi), it had a population density of 0.3/km^{2} (0.8/sq mi) in 2021.

In the 2016 Census of Population, the RM of Key West No. 70 recorded a population of 255 living in 107 of its 142 total private dwellings, a −11.1% change from its 2011 population of 287. With a land area of 825.26 km^{2} (318.63 sq mi), it had a population density of 0.3/km^{2} (0.8/sq mi) in 2016.

== Government ==
The RM of Key West No. 70 is governed by an elected municipal council and an appointed administrator that meets on the first Thursday of every month. The reeve of the RM is Zane McKerricher while its administrator is Yvonne Johnston. The RM's office is located in Ogema.
