= Great Western Railway (Saskatchewan) =

Canadian shortline railway

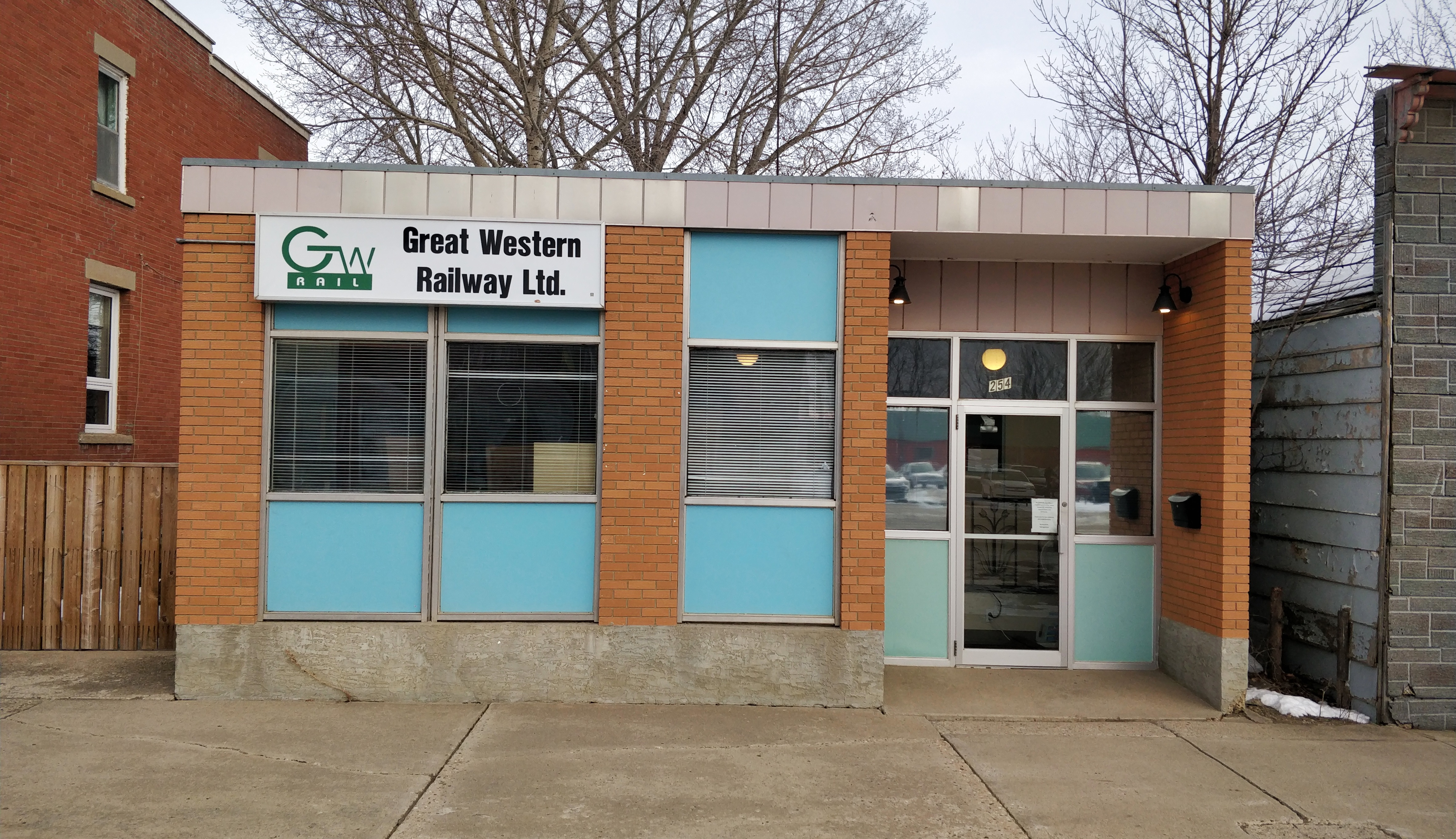
- Great Western head office

Overview
- Headquarters: Shaunavon, Saskatchewan
- Reporting mark: GWRS
- Locale: Southwestern Saskatchewan, Canada
- Dates of operation: 1999–Present
- Predecessor: Canadian Pacific Railway

Technical
- Track gauge: 4 ft 8 1/2 in (1,435 mm) standard gauge
- Length: 440 miles (710 km)

Other
- Website: www.greatwesternrail.com

The Great Western Railway (reporting mark GWRS) is a Canadian short line railway company operating on former Canadian Pacific Railway trackage in Southwest Saskatchewan. Great Western Railway Ltd. is an operating company that services the line and is locally owned and operated by farmers and municipalities in Southwestern Saskatchewan.

== History ==
Abbotsford based Westcan Ltd., a railway contracting and maintenance company from BC, purchased 330 miles of track from CP and announced the launch of a new Westcan-owned short line, Great Western Railway Ltd, to provide service on these lines. The original purchase date was July 31, 2000, but this date was pushed to September 8, 2000 after overwhelming rainfall washed out 16 km of track on the Vanguard Subdivision, one of the branches that was being sold. An agreement was reached with Canadian Pacific to repair the damaged section at a cost of more than 500,000 before the takeover was completed.

In 2004 the railway was purchased by local investors from the area of Saskatchewan it serves. It is now locally owned and operated. Great Western Railway continues to serve many producer loading sites along their entire rail network, but also provide railcar storage for Class I railways and railcar companies.

GWR operates on 308 miles (496 km) of former Canadian Pacific Railway's Shaunavon, Vanguard, Altawan and Notukeu Subdivisions. GWR also services 60 miles (97 km) on the Fife Lake Railway, which is wholly owned by the company, and another 72 miles (116 km) of the Red Coat Road & Rail on a yearly contractual basis.

== Engine Roster ==
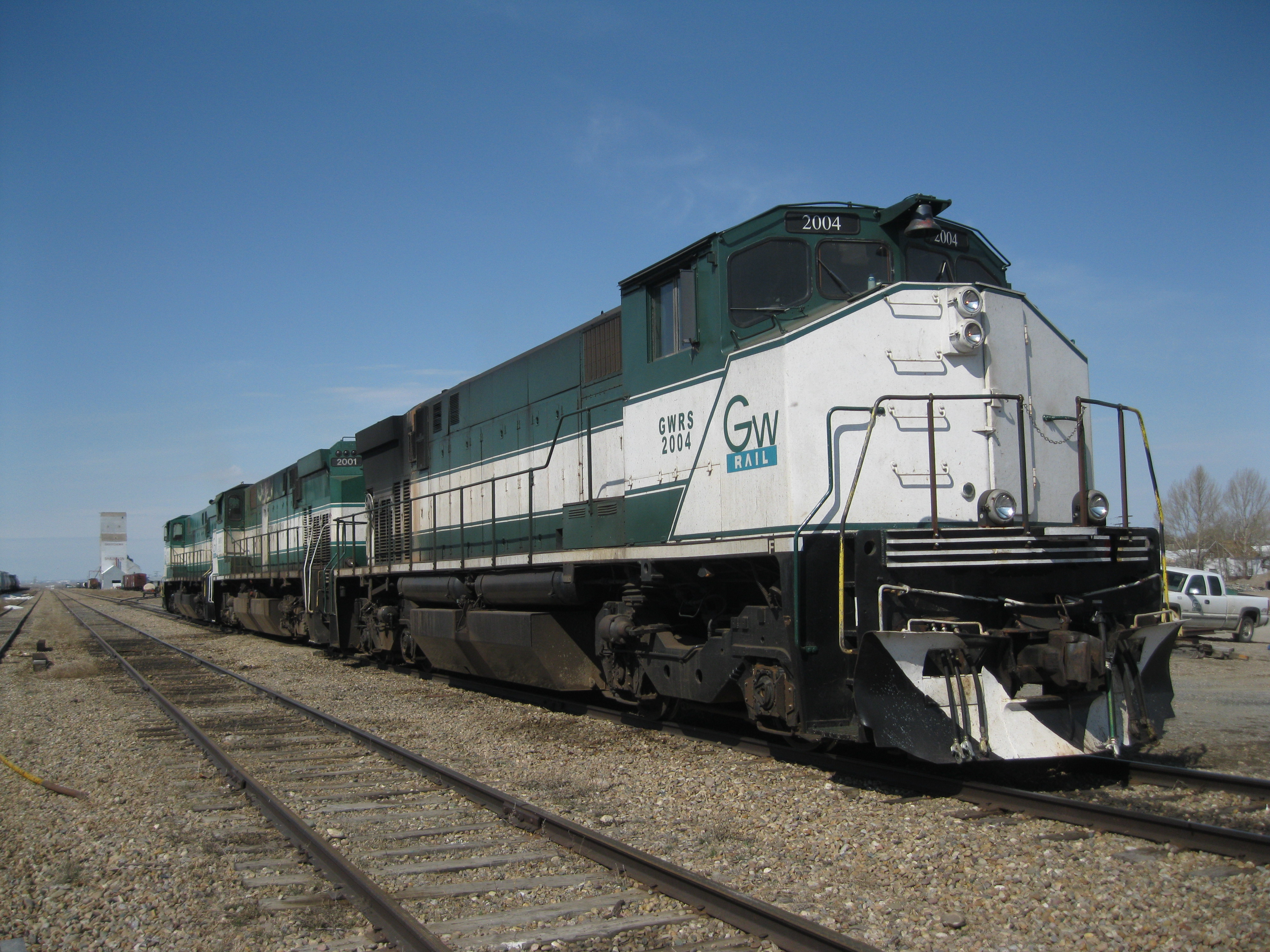
A trio of GWRS M420s idling outside of the Shaunavon shops.

Great Western Railway had humble beginnings hauling hopper cars of grain for small producer loading sites, but as Great Western Railway gradually gained trackage rights over Red Coat Road & Rail and Fife Lake Railway, the railway required more motive power to provide sufficient customer service for their new customers. Up until 2011, Great Western Railway utilized an all MLW M420 roster; however, with the increased maintenance cost of operating Montreal Locomotive Works locomotives, Great Western Railway decided to purchase their first General Electric units. In March 2011 it was announced Great Western Railway would receive two former Burlington Northern Santa Fe GE Dash 8-40BWs for the original Great Western route. In early 2017, GWRS 576 was purchased, continuing the company's effort to move into an entire G.E. fleet. Great Western Rail is currently in the process of selling their entire MLW fleet.

Unit	Model	Built	Acquired	History	Retired	Status	Image
563	B40-8W	1992	2011	ATSF 563 (1992-2003) BNSF 563 (2003-2011) GWRS 563 (2011–Present)	N/A	Active	
575	B40-8W	1992	2011	ATSF 575 (1992-2003) BNSF 575 (2003-2011) GWRS 575 (2011–Present)	N/A	Active	
576	B40-8	1989	2017	NYSW 4048 (1989-1990) CSXT 5937 (1990-2015) (temporarily de-rated to B20-8) WRIX 5937 (2015-2017) GWRS 576 (2017–Present)	N/A	Active	
577	B40-8	1988	2021	CR 5088 (1988-Late 90s) NS 4816 (Late 90s-2006) CSXT 5978 (2006-After 2018) GECX 5978 (Before 2020 -2021) GWRS 577 (2021–Present)	N/A	Active	
578	B40-8	1988	2021	CR 5067 (1988- Late 90s) NS 4803 (Late 90s - 2006) CSXT 5965 (2006 - After 2018) (Temporarily re-rated to B20-8) GECX 5965 (Before 2020 - 2021)	N/A	Active	
2000	M420	1973	2000	CN 2522 (1973-1987) CN 3522 (1987-2000) CCCR 2000 (2000-2001) GWRS 2000 (2001-2020) KRC 2404 (2020–Present)	2017-2019	Sold	
2001	M420	1973	2001	CN 2514 (1973-1987) CN 3514 (1987-2000) CCCR 2001 (2000-2001) GWRS 2001 (2001-2020) KRC 2405 (2020–Present)	2017-2019	Sold	
2002	M420R	1974	2002	P&W 2002 (1974- Early 90s) MECR 2002 (Early 90s - Late 90s) NREX 2002 (Late 90s -2003) GWRS (2003-2019) SLSX owned since 2019	2017-2019	Sold	
2003	M420	1977	2008	CN 2571 (1977- Late 80s) CN 3571 (Late 80s - Unknown) CANX 3571 KPR 3571 LSRC 3571 (Early 2000s -2007) GWRS 2003 (2007-2019) SLSX owned since 2019	2017-2019	Sold	
2004	M420	1976	2008	CN 2563 (1976- Late 80s) CN 3563 (Late 80s -Unknown) CANX 3563 KPR 3563 LSRC 3563 (Early 2000s -2007) GWRS 2004 (2007-2019) SLSX owned since 2019	2017-2019	Sold	
4062	B23-7	1979	2013	CR 1974 (1979-1999) NS 4062 (1999-2005) AOK 4062 (2005-2013) GWRS 4062 (2013–Present)	N/A	Active	
4064	B23-7	1979	2013	CR 1976 (1979-1999) NS 4064 (1999-2005) AOK 4064 (2005-2013) GWRS 4064 (2013–Present)	N/A	Active	

== See also ==
- List of Canadian railways
- Rail transport in Canada
