= Big Beaver, Saskatchewan =

Community in Saskatchewan, Canada

Hamlet of Big Beaver
- Hamlet
- Location within Saskatchewan
- Coordinates: 49°05′57″N 105°10′15″W
- Country: Canada
- Province: Saskatchewan
- Rural municipality: Happy Valley

Area
  - Total: 0.22 km^{2} (0.085 sq mi)

Population (2021)
  - Total: 10
  - Density: 45.5/km^{2} (118/sq mi)
- Time zone: CST

Big Beaver is an organized hamlet in the Canadian province of Saskatchewan. It is situated at the junction of Highways 18 and 34 in the Rural Municipality of Happy Valley No. 10. North of Big Beaver along Highway 34 is the Big Muddy Badlands. South of town, at the end of Highway 34, is the now closed US border crossing of Big Beaver. The port was closed to northbound traffic in 2011 and to southbound traffic in 2013.

Within the community is the Big Beaver Regional Park. The park has a picnic area and a campground.

== Demographics ==
In the 2021 Census of Population conducted by Statistics Canada, Big Beaver had a population of 10 living in 12 of its 19 total private dwellings, a change of 0% from its 2016 population of 10. With a land area of 0.22 km^{2} (0.085 sq mi), it had a population density of 45.5/km^{2} (117.7/sq mi) in 2021.

== In popular culture ==
Big Beaver is referenced in Warren Zevon's song "Hit Somebody (The Hockey Song)" from his 2002 album My Ride's Here. It featured vocals by David Letterman.

== See also ==
- List of communities in Saskatchewan
