= Bengough, Saskatchewan =

Town in Saskatchewan, Canada

Bengough
- Motto: Gateway to the Big Muddy
- Location within Saskatchewan Location within Canada
- Coordinates: 49°23′46″N 105°07′40″W
- Country: Canada
- Provinces and territories of Canada: Saskatchewan
- Rural municipalities (RM): Bengough No. 40
- Post office Founded: 1912-03-01
- Village: 1911
- Town: 1958

Area
  - Total: 1.07 km^{2} (0.41 sq mi)

Population (2021)
  - Total: 332
  - Density: 295.7/km^{2} (766/sq mi)
  - Summer (DST): CST
- Website: http://www.bengough.com/

Bengough (/ˈbɛn.ɡɔːf/) is a town surrounded by the Rural Municipality of Bengough No. 40, in the Canadian province of Saskatchewan. A southeastern Saskatchewan prairie town, Bengough is located east of Willow Bunch Lake on Highway 34 near Highway 705. The town is named Bengough after cartoonist John Wilson Bengough. Bengough also plays host to the Gateway Festival which showcases various musicians and several other events through the weekend, usually taking place in late July.

== History ==
Homesteading in the Bengough area started around 1906. In 1911, Bengough was incorporated as a village and a rail line was built by the Canadian Northern Railway (CNoR). Bengough was incorporated as a town in 1958. The town was an agricultural hub to the surrounding area with grain elevators from Federal Grain Limited, Parrish Heimbecker Ltd., and the Saskatchewan Wheat Pool established within the town limits. The railway running through the town of Bengough is no longer in operation. As of 2007, only the Saskatchewan Wheat Pool elevator is still in operation, owned and operated by a local farmer organization.

== Geography ==
Bengough is located within the Missouri Coteau near Willow Bunch Lake, Big Muddy Lake, Salt Lake, and Channel Lake. Few well-defined streams or creeks are located near the townsite. The landscape where the town is located is characterized by pitted and rolling topography of the moraine deposits that dominate the landscape. Just south of Bengough is the Big Muddy Badlands.

== Demographics ==
In the 2021 Census of Population conducted by Statistics Canada, Bengough had a population of 332 living in 175 of its 207 total private dwellings, a change of 0% from its 2016 population of 332. With a land area of 1.12 km^{2} (0.43 sq mi), it had a population density of 296.4/km^{2} (767.7/sq mi) in 2021.

Canada census – Bengough community profile

	2021	2016	2011
Population	332 (+0.0% from 2016)	332 (6.1% from 2011)	313 (-7.1% from 2006)
Land area	1.12 km^{2} (0.43 sq mi)	1.07 km^{2} (0.41 sq mi)	1.07 km^{2} (0.41 sq mi)
Population density	295.7/km^{2} (766/sq mi)	309.8/km^{2} (802/sq mi)	292/km^{2} (760/sq mi)
Median age	56.4 (M: 54.8, F: 57.6)	57.0 (M: 53.2, F: 60.4)	56.5 (M: 54.5, F: 59)
Private dwellings	207 (total) 175 (occupied)	250 (total)	230 (total)
Median household income	$54,800

References: 2021 2016 2011

== Economy ==
Located in a mixed farming and ranching area, Bengough's main economic industry is agriculture. Regina, Assiniboia and Weyburn are the closest neighbouring major communities.

== Bengough & District Regional Park ==
Bengough & District Regional Park (49.3918°N 105.1268°W) is a regional park located adjacent to Bengough, just off Highway 34. The park was founded in 1975 with land donated by the RM of Bengough No. 40, a cash donation from Bengough, and a five-year capital investment from the Department of Tourism & Renewable Resources.

At Bengough Regional Park, there's a well-treed campground with 29 sites, a golf course, and an outdoor swimming pool. The campsites are full service including potable water, sewer, and power, as well as washroom and shower facilities. The golf course, which opened in 1980, is a 9-hole, sand green course that has a clubhouse and driving range.

Other amenities at the park include a playground area, hiking trails, beach volleyball court, ball diamonds, and horseshoe pits.

== Arts and culture ==
Bengough is the home of the Gateway Festival, a family friendly folk/roots festival showcasing a wide variety of talent from Saskatchewan and beyond. Past performers include Steve Earle, Nitty Gritty Dirt Band, Buffy Sainte-Marie, Tom Cochrane, 54-40, Corb Lund, Sloan, Kim Mitchell, Kathleen Edwards, Jess Moskaluke, Tenille Arts, Northern Pikes, Colter Wall, The Sheepdogs, and many more. The annual festival takes place the fourth weekend of July.

== See also ==
- List of towns in Saskatchewan
- List of communities in Saskatchewan
