= Big Muddy Creek (Missouri River tributary) =

Tributary of the Missouri River in the United States and Canada

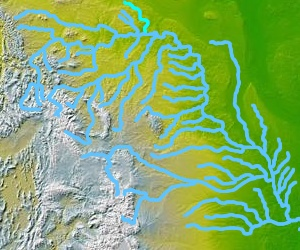
- Big Muddy Creek shown highlighted

Location
- Countries: Canada; United States
- Provinces/states: Saskatchewan; Montana

Physical characteristics
- Source
  - coordinates: 49.1083°N 104.8751°W
  - elevation: 2,152 ft (656 m)
- Mouth
  - coordinates: 48°08′30″N 104°36′43″W
  - elevation: 1,900 ft (580 m)
- Length: 191 mi (307 km)

Basin features
- River system: Missouri River

Big Muddy Creek is a tributary of the Missouri River, approximately 191 mi (307 km) long, in the Canadian province of Saskatchewan and the U.S. state of Montana. Its source is in the Big Muddy Badlands of Saskatchewan.

Big Muddy Creek begins in southern Saskatchewan at Big Muddy Lake, east of Big Beaver, Saskatchewan. It flows south through the Big Muddy Badlands and into Sheridan County, Montana, past Redstone. From there, east past Plentywood and then south forming the eastern border of Fort Peck Indian Reservation. It joins the Missouri west of Culbertson.

It was explored in 1805 by the Lewis and Clark Expedition, who called it Martha's River in their journals and noticed on their return voyage in 1806 that it had changed its mouth on the Missouri.

Along with the Milk River and the Poplar River, it is one of three waterways in Canada that drain into the Gulf of Mexico.

== Variant names ==
Big Muddy Creek has also been known as: Big Muddy River, Little Yellow River, Martha River, Martha's River, Marthas River, Marthy's River and Park River.

== See also ==
- List of rivers of Montana
- List of rivers of Saskatchewan
- List of tributaries of the Missouri River
