= Willow Bunch Lake =

Lake in Saskatchewan, Canada

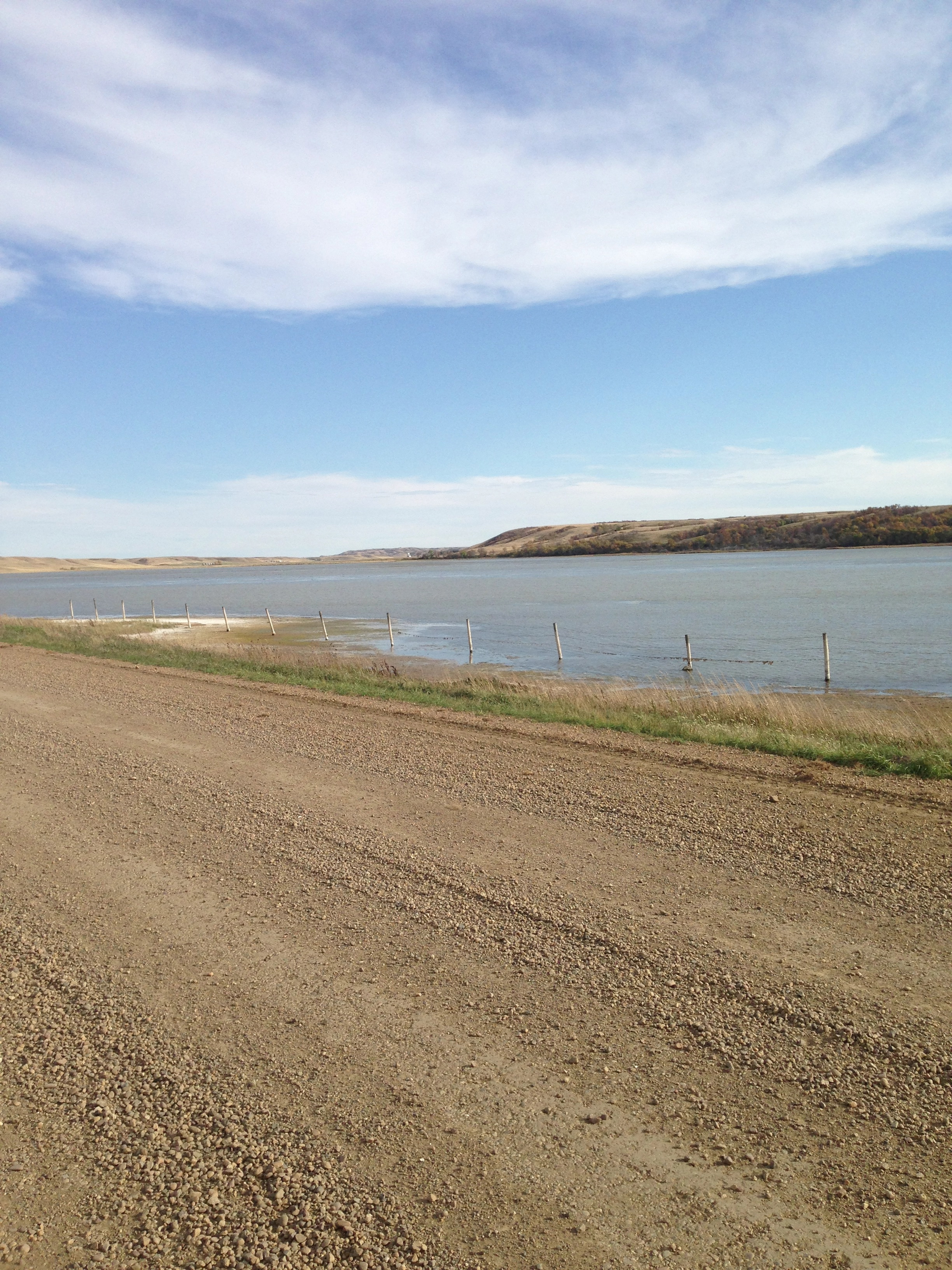
- Willow Bunch Lake

- Location in Saskatchewan Willow Bunch Lake (Canada)
- Location: RM of Willow Bunch No. 42 and RM of Excel No. 71, Saskatchewan
- Coordinates: 49.4582°N 105.5901°W
- Type: Salt lake
- Part of: Missouri River drainage basin
- Basin countries: Canada
- Max. length: 30 km (19 mi)
- Max. width: 2 km (1.2 mi)
- Surface area: 3,287.9 ha (8,125 acres)
- Surface elevation: 662 m (2,172 ft)
- Settlements: None

Willow Bunch Lake is a salt lake in the southern region of the Canadian province of Saskatchewan. The lake is in the Big Muddy Valley in a semi-arid region called Palliser's Triangle. There are no communities nor public facilities at the lake. The nearest town is Willow Bunch at 8 kilometres (5.0 mi) to the south and access is from Highway 36. The entire lake and its shoreline has been designated an Important Bird Area (IBA) of Canada.

== Description ==
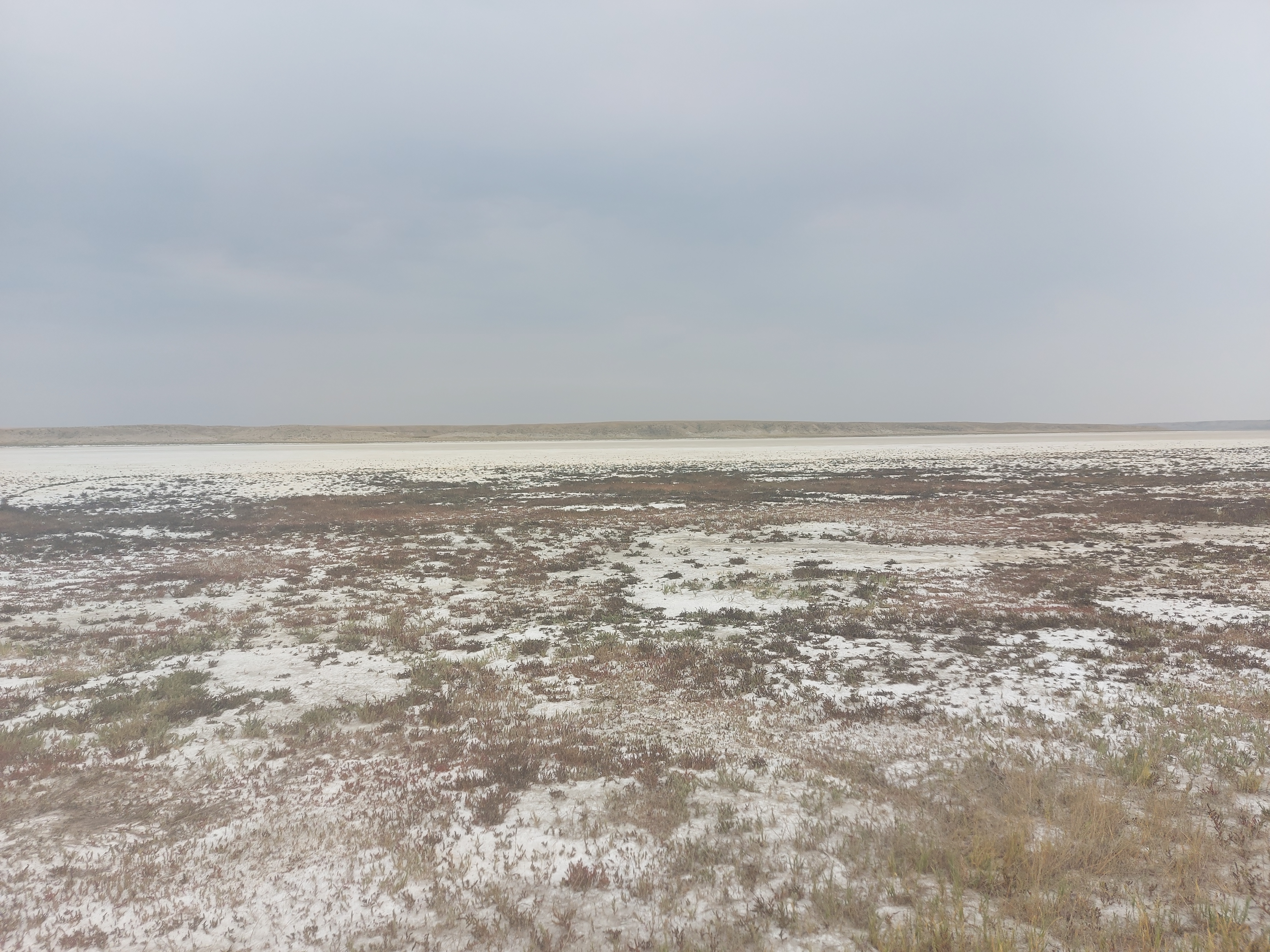
Salt flats of Willow Bunch Lake

Willow Bunch Lake is shallow salt lake with a surface area of about 3,287.9 hectares (8,125 acres). It sits in the Big Muddy Valley, which was formed over 12,000 years ago near the end of the last ice age when a glacial lake outburst flood occurred from a pre-historic glacial lake located at present-day Old Wives Lake. In the summer, extensive mudflats develop at the east and west ends of the lake providing habitat for a variety of species, including the piping plover.

== Important Bird Area ==
The entirety of Willow Bunch Lake is part of the Willow Bunch Lake (SK 020) Important Bird Area (IBA) of Canada. The IBA, which totals 152.14 km^{2} (58.74 sq mi), is important to the piping plover as it has one of the three largest breeding concentrations on the Canadian Prairies. The other two areas are Chaplin Lake (SK 033) and Quill Lakes SK 002. The provincial Wildlife Habitat Protection Act designated the entire Willow Bunch Lake basin as a critical piping plover habitat and the lake's shoreline up to the high water mark is protected from development. The population and breeding success of the piping plover depends largely on lake water levels. Being in a semi-arid landscape with no major inflows, Willow Bunch Lake is subject to widely fluctuating water levels and this becomes one of the main threats to the long-term success of the birds.

== See also ==
- List of lakes of Saskatchewan
- List of protected areas of Saskatchewan
