= Ogema, Saskatchewan =

Town in Saskatchewan, Canada

Ogema
- Town
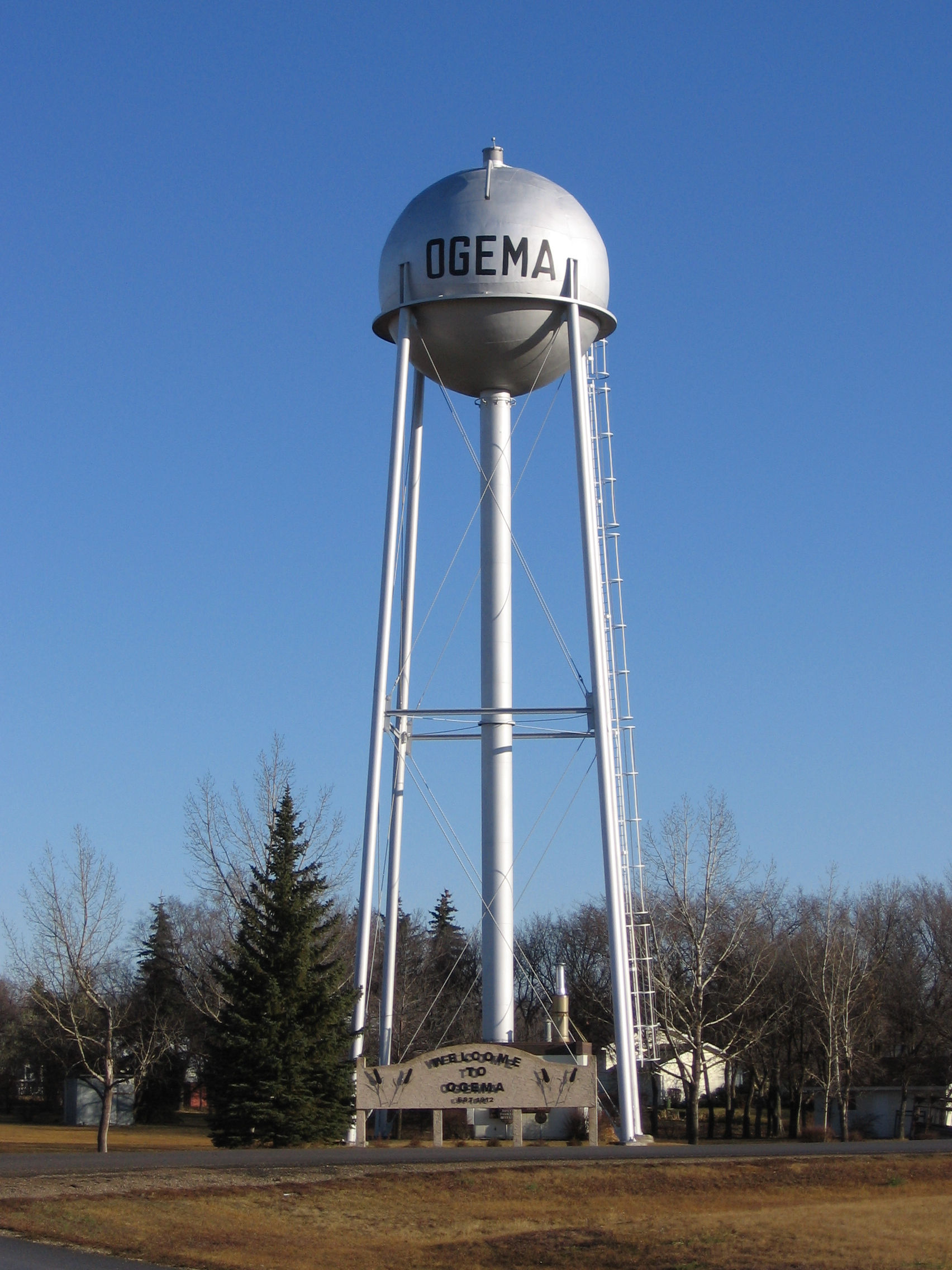
- Ogema water tower and welcome sign

- Location of Ogema in Saskatchewan Ogema (Canada)
- Coordinates: 49°34′25″N 104°54′56″W
- Country: Canada
- Province: Saskatchewan
- Rural Municipality: Key West No. 70
- Founded: 1908
- Incorporated (village): 1911
- Incorporated (town): 1912

Government
  - Governing Body: Ogema Town Council
  - Mayor: Carol Peterson
  - Administrator: Joy Christian
  - MLA Weyburn-Big Muddy constituency: Dustin Duncan
  - MP Souris-Moose Mountain: Robert Kitchen

Area
  - Total: 1.43 km^{2} (0.55 sq mi)

Population (2021)
  - Total: 383
  - Density: 282.1/km^{2} (731/sq mi)
- Time zone: UTC−6 (CST)
- Postal code: S0C 1Y0
- Area codes: 306, 639
- Highways: Highway 13 (Red Coat Trail / Ghost Town Trail) / Highway 623
- Website: www.ogema.ca

Ogema is a town in south central Saskatchewan, Canada. It is approximately 115 kilometres (71 mi) south of Saskatchewan's capital city, Regina, and about midway between Weyburn and Assiniboia on Highway 13.

== History ==
Ogema's first settlers arrived in 1908. Most of those settlers came from the Bruce and Huron county regions of Ontario, but a few came from other parts of the world, including the United States, Europe and the British Isles.

While the first settlers arrived in 1908, it wasn't until 1911 that a post office was established with the name of Ogema. "Omega", which is Greek for "end", was originally chosen as the community's name because, at the time of settlement, it was "the end of the railway". However, when it came time to register the name, they were told by the authorities that there was another town named Omega and no two communities with the same name would be allowed. So it came to be that two letters were switched and "Ogema" was born. Ogema is an Ojibwe word meaning "Chief".

The lots for the town of Ogema were originally sold by the Canadian Pacific Railway, which was then building a branch line through southern Saskatchewan.

During the early years of settlement, several modes of transportation were used. Along with walking, a people travelled by horseback, wagons, buggies, and sleighs during the winter. Living quarters were prepared by the men, who went ahead of their families to make sure the homestead was ready. Power to these homesteads was supplied by oxen, mules, or horses. The horses were fed with grain obtained through threshing. The seeding was done with wooden box drills. Threshing time was very exciting for the people of Ogema, as it was seen as the payoff for a year's worth of homesteading.

In February 1911, Ogema was declared a village on the west 1/2 at 22-7-22. On August 10, 1911, the Canadian Pacific Railway line between Assiniboia and Weyburn reached Ogema. In 1912, a telegraph line reached the village, construction of the first curling rink began, and the village's first official sports day was held on June 12. On July 5, 1912, lumber yard manager Raymond Kenneth Rounds coordinated a census which concluded that there were 540 citizens living in the village.

On October 4, 1912, a motion of council proclaimed "Be it resolved that secretary-treasurer post up notices of the intention of village council to apply to the Lieutenant-Governor in Council for the corporation of the village into a town." In December 1912, having attained a population of 500, Ogema's status was upgraded from village to town.

On February 8, 1913, elections for council were held for the newborn town and A.R. Sargent was named mayor.

The year 1914 marked the beginning of the First World War and the town's men enlisted in the military. They sold or rented their homesteads and went off to war.

Disaster struck the town in January 1915 when a fire broke out on the east side of Main Street and destroyed nine businesses. Below zero temperatures contributed to the freezing of the fire engine, and so it was of minimal use when it came to extinguishing the fire.

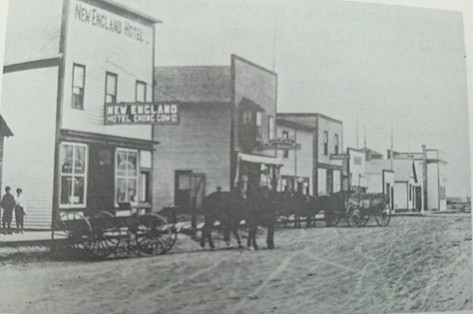
East side of Main Street before 1915 fire

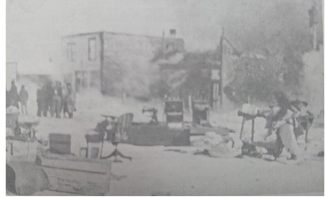
Main Street fire, 1915

As the war wound down, the town struggled to adjust as the men returned home from the battlefield. Due to injuries sustained while fighting, some of the men could no longer do farm work and had to find other jobs. Also around this period, a flu epidemic seized the town and wiped out entire families. Eventually, though, the returning soldiers settled into their new jobs and the epidemic passed, giving the people of Ogema renewed hope for the 1920s.

=== 1920-1945 ===
The 1920s in Ogema were a time of innovation as inventions were developed to help the farming world. The 1930s marked the beginning of the Depression that affected Ogema as well. In 1939, with the beginning of the Second World War, young men and women enlisted in the service.

==== 1920s ====
There was a boom in Ogema in the 1920s. The economy was based on "mixed farming and ranching."

In 1927, cement sidewalks were poured and were financed by debentures. Scouting: started in 1927 with three patrols and held summer camps in Willow Bunch Lake.

===== Leading up to the Great Depression =====
1928 marked a high in wheat production. However, for years farmers burned their fields to get rid of stubble and make way for the next year's crop. They did not understand at the time that this could take all the moisture from the ground. Around the beginning of the 1930s, rainfall declined and the soil dried, harming plant-roots. Wind turned to gales that lasted days and at times the sun turned "blood red".

==== 1930s ====
The "Dirty Thirties" were a bad time for Ogema. Not much was growing and the drought was deep; wells ran dry and water had to be hauled in. The Canadian government sent "relief" cars that brought in vegetables, fish, bedding, and other basics to the rural residents. Settlers faced "hot dry winds, dust storms, and grasshoppers."

===== Transportation =====
In the 1930s, there was a food and gas shortage. Many took the engines out of their cars and attached horses to the front. They were called "Bennett Buggies."

===== Population =====
Ogema experienced an "exodus" during this time. Problems arose as people weren't able to afford their property taxes and many families packed up and left, others stayed and tried their best.

===== Farming =====
The government offered financial assistance to farmers for dugouts and set up community pastures. Farmers were now also faced with the task of finding rust-resistant wheat.

==== 1940-1945 ====
The Second World War hit closer to home than the previous war for the people of Ogema, as now there were radios that broadcast daily reports.

The lack of labourers forced farmers to invest in better machinery, which helped increase production. Quickly there was a grain surplus and thus more storage places and quonsets were built. As well, ration books were needed for things such as gasoline and "imported food stuffs."

=== Post-War Period ===
==== 4H Club ====
The Boys and Girls Club Work, the present 4H program in Ogema, was organized in 1949 with a mostly agricultural focus. Two of the clubs include the Ogema Beef Club and the Ogema Homestead Club. Achievements from both are recognized beyond Ogema. The Ogema Beef Club team took first place at the Farm Boys Camp in Regina in 1955. The Ogema Homestead Club also placed first at the Moose Jaw Farm Girls' Camp in the same year. The 4H clubs travel by bus for tours all around Saskatchewan. In 1965, both clubs came together to form the Ogema 4H Multiple Club, which continues presently. Most Achievement Days and meetings are held at the Ogema School.

==== Water Tower ====
In 1961, the water tower was built to provide a safe water supply for the people living in Ogema. The well is drilled 248 feet deep. More water pipes were set in place and more fire hydrants installed, showing a definite sign of progress for the town.

==== Deep South Pioneer Museum ====
The town of Ogema has been known as a place of heritage since the establishment of the Deep South Pioneer Museum in 1977. Residents wanted a safe place to store and present their heritage valuables, so volunteers worked to restore them until they were ready for display. At first, the museum buildings were spread over five acres of land, which soon became too small, so another five acres were purchased. The Deep South Pioneer Museum opened to the public on July 12, 1980, in correlation with Saskatchewan's 75th anniversary. The museum maintains over 30 buildings, many of which were moved from Main Street and areas surrounding Ogema. Each building holds artifacts to take visitors on a tour of pioneer living, especially in terms of agriculture: The museum houses over 150 pieces of old farm equipment. The buildings include a drug store, an Anglican church, and homes.

==== Museum Day ====
The day after the Agricultural Society Annual Fair Day is Museum Day. Visitors take a tour of the museum and watch demonstrations made in the buildings about the pioneer way of life. The day begins with a pancake breakfast, then a church service, and then demonstrations, which include blacksmithing, flour-making, and rope-making. Together, the Agricultural Society Fair Day and Museum Day are meant to be an event to take pride in Ogema’s new and old citizens, and attract visitors from outside of the area.

==== Riding Arena ====
In 2001, the Ogema Riding Arena was built by members of the Big Muddy Team Roping Association. Many roping and barrel racing events take place here. The largest purpose of the arena is for the annual Agricultural Society Fair Day every July, where a kid's rodeo and horse pulls take place.

== Geography ==
Ogema is situated in an internal drainage basin, with rolling hills and shallow sloughs. Typically, these sloughs mark regional low spots and are fed by a series of interconnected sloughs called kettle chains.

== Demographics ==
A pie chart examining the largest and smallest age groups of Ogema in 2016 from youngest to oldest

A bar graph showing the growth in population in Ogema from 2006 to 2016

In the 2021 Census of Population conducted by Statistics Canada, Ogema had a population of 383 living in 155 of its 192 total private dwellings, a change of −5% from its 2016 population of 403. With a land area of 1.33 km^{2} (0.51 sq mi), it had a population density of 288.0/km^{2} (745.8/sq mi) in 2021.

Numerous Filipinos live in the town, many of whom initially arrived to work at the Big Sky hog barn that opened in 2000.

Canada census – Ogema community profile

	2021	2011
Population	383 (-5.0% from 2016)	368 (+21.1% from 2006)
Land area	1.33 km^{2} (0.51 sq mi)	1.43 km^{2} (0.55 sq mi)
Population density	287.3/km^{2} (744/sq mi)	257.6/km^{2} (667/sq mi)
Median age	42.8 (M: 43.6, F: 41.6)	43.3 (M: 44.1, F: 42.9)
Private dwellings	155 (total)	187 (total)
Median household income

References: 2021 2011

== Government ==
Ogema has a mayor as the highest ranking government official. They also elects aldermen or councillors to form the municipal council. Provincially, Ogema is within the Weyburn-Big Muddy constituency and served by their MLA. Ogema is represented in the House of Commons of Canada by MP of the Souris—Moose Mountain riding.

== Education ==
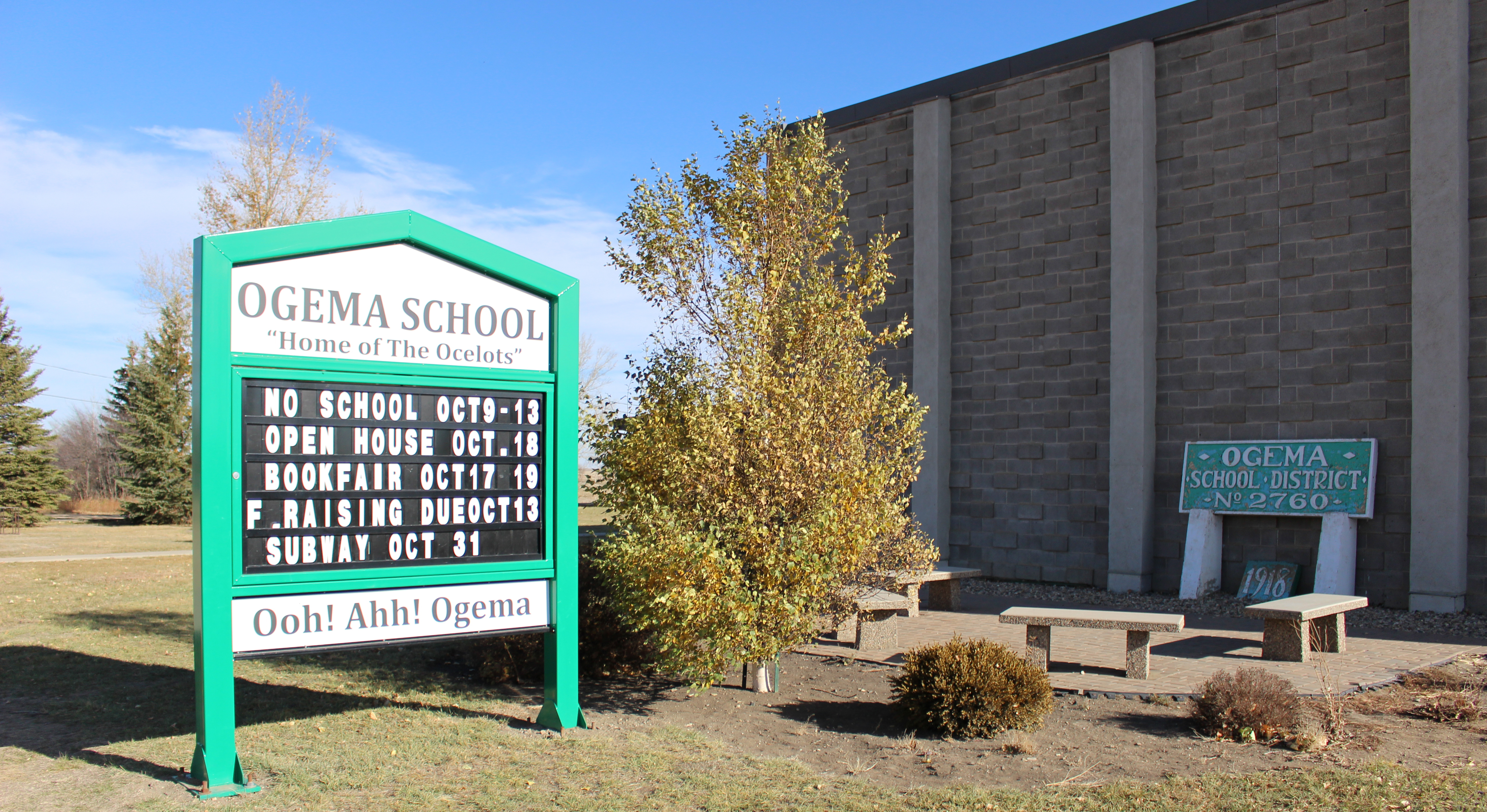
Ogema School, "Home of the Ocelots"

Ogema received its first school in 1911. A larger school was built in 1919 in the centre of town with several additions being built over the next 20 years. Ogema is currently served by Ogema School, a K-12 school built in 1961 which is in the South East Cornerstone Public School Division. The school has an enrolment of approximately 100 students.

=== Ogema School ===
The Ogema School ranges from kindergarten to grade twelve, and is on Mehnke Street. The school offers a variety of courses, giving students the option to pursue further studies in post-secondary institutions.

== Attractions ==
=== The Ogema Fire Hall ===
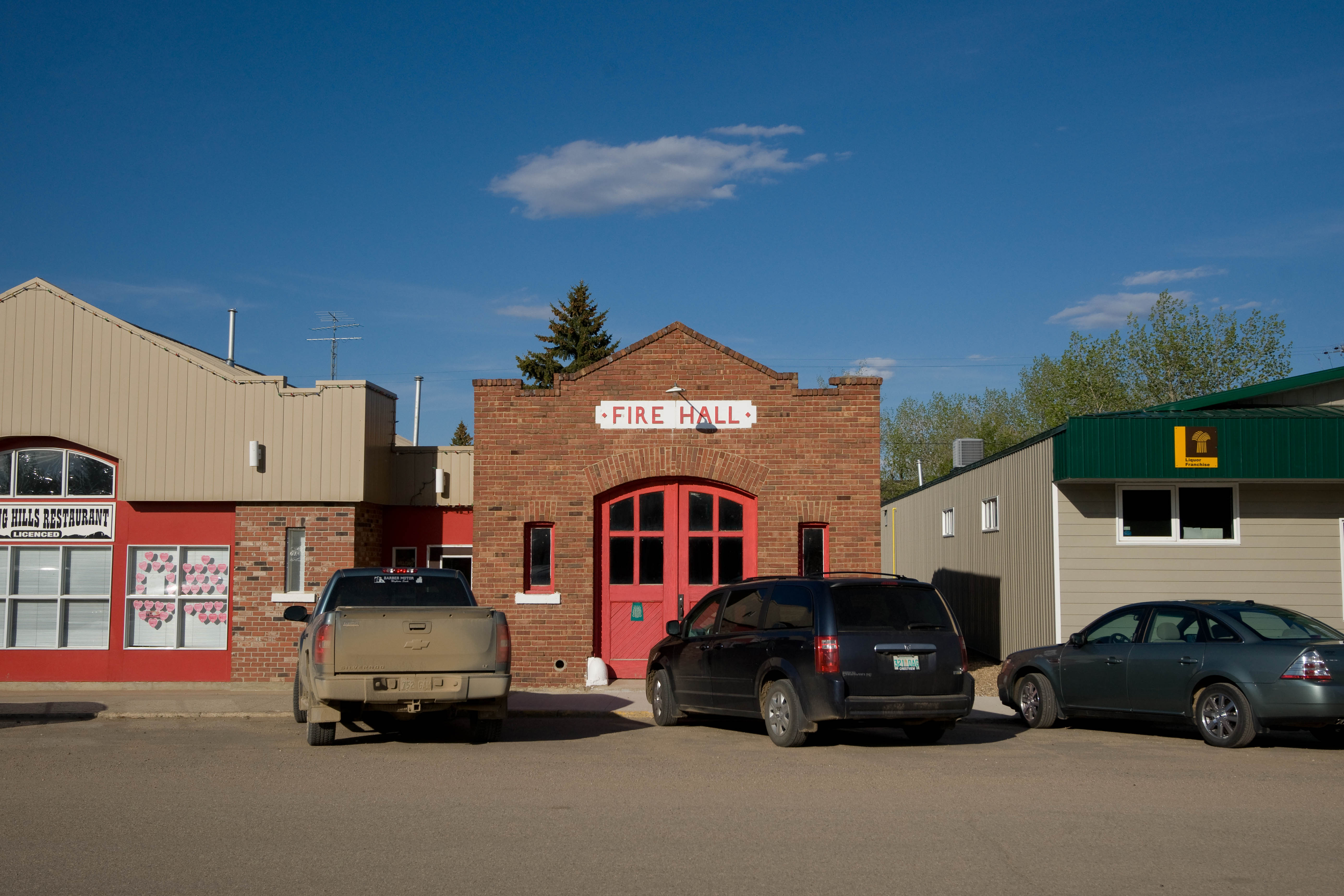
Ogema Fire Hall

The Fire Hall and Fire Wall were built after the fire of 1915 that destroyed much of Ogema's Main Street to prevent any future fires from spreading. The Fire Hall is equipped with a cistern to hold water to fight fires, and a jail cell. The hall is designated a Municipal Heritage Property. Attached to the Fire Hall and on the opposite side of the street there is a brick wall that measures 30 feet high, 70 feet long and 16 inches thick. This Fire Wall is designed to stop fires from spreading along the businesses of Main Street. The Fire Wall was also designated a Municipal Heritage Property, until its destruction in a windstorm on January 14, 2021.

=== 1912 Canadian Pacific Railway Train Station ===
The restored Canadian Pacific Railway station.

Ogema's original train station stood at the south end of Main Street on the north side of the railway tracks. Construction began on a train line from Weyburn to Assiniboia in 1909. By 1912 the line reached Ogema which was the midway point, and was completed in 1912. After passenger use declined and the station closed down, it was removed from the site and sold for scrap in the 1960s. In the early 2000s a committee was struck to oversee the return of a 1912 CPR train station to the original site. And in 2002, a station, being used as a grain bin at the time, was located and transported from Simpson, SK to Ogema. Over the next seven years, 1,000 of hours of labour were put into the station and, in the summer of 2009, it was opened to the public, nearly fully restored and furnished with original furniture and artifacts. Today, the Station has been fully refurbished and Southern Prairie Railway runs historical train tours from Ogema.

=== The Ogema Heritage Grandstand ===
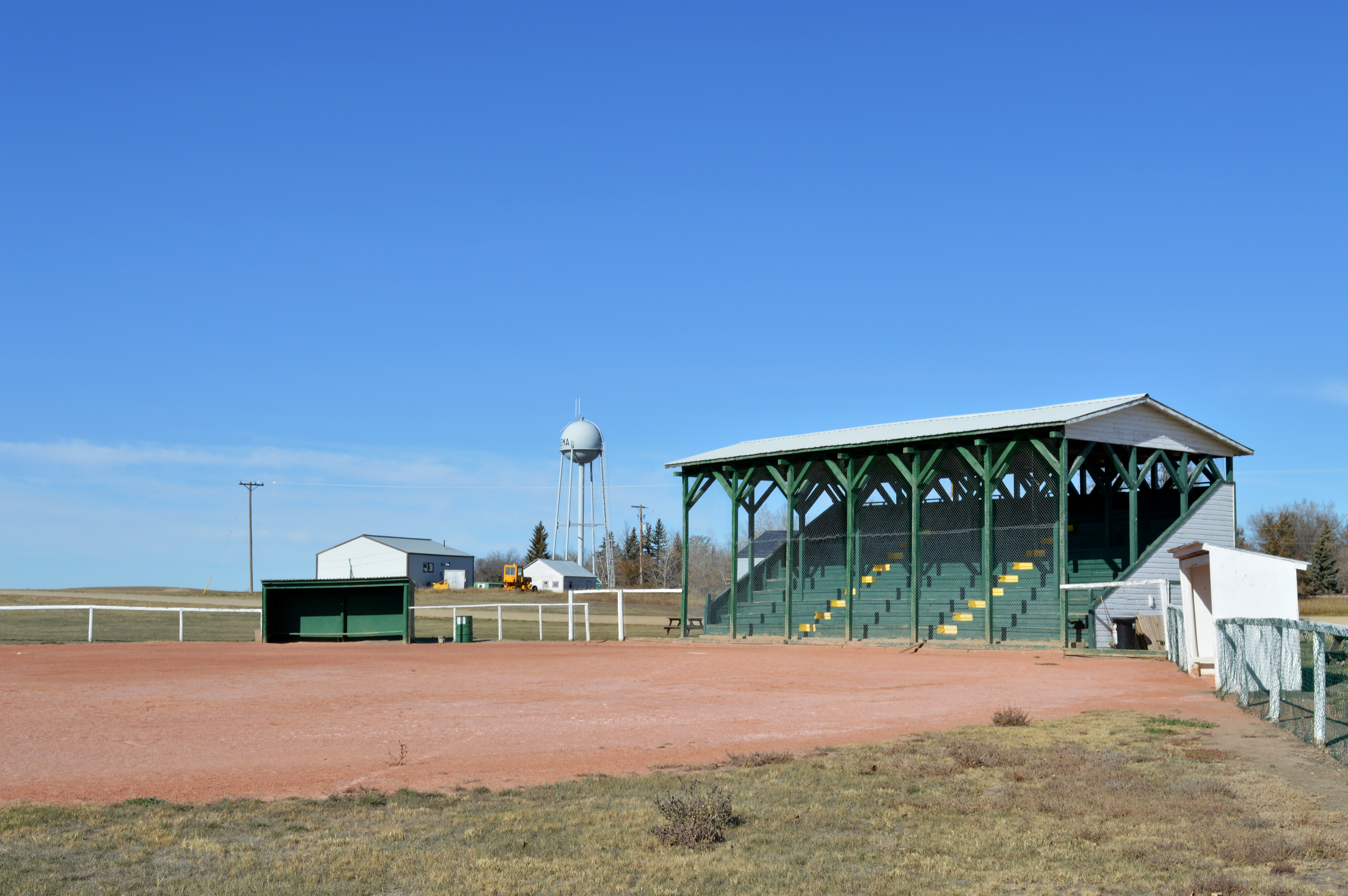
The Ogema Heritage Grandstand

The grandstand was originally built in the 1920s by the Ogema Agricultural society. It is currently the oldest community grandstand in Western Canada, and it is still the site of the Ogema Agricultural Society Annual Fair day, which is the longest running agricultural fair in Saskatchewan. In 2004, the grandstand was dedicated to Arleene Johnson Noga, a women’s American baseball player who was raised in Ogema. This grandstand and field are home to the Ogema Colts, a men's baseball team in the Borderline Fastball League.

=== Ogema Regional Park ===
Ogema Regional Park (49.5721°N 104.9168°W) includes a campground, skating rink, curling rink, pool, heritage hall, and the Ogema Grandstand. In the spring of 1911, the town of Ogema and the Canadian Pacific Railway (CPR) began construction on a small park surrounding the train station. This park eventually became part of the regional park. It was originally owned by the Ogema Agricultural Society. On July 26, 1967, the park title was transferred from the Ogema Agricultural Society to the Regional Park Authority, allowing for the park to be given regional park status.

=== The British American Gas Station ===
The British America Gas Station is the only heritage service station in Saskatchewan. It was first built in 1925 by Harry Brogden, and closed in 1985. The town has since restored the filling station and in 1997 it was given Municipal Heritage Property Status.

=== Deep South Pioneer Museum ===
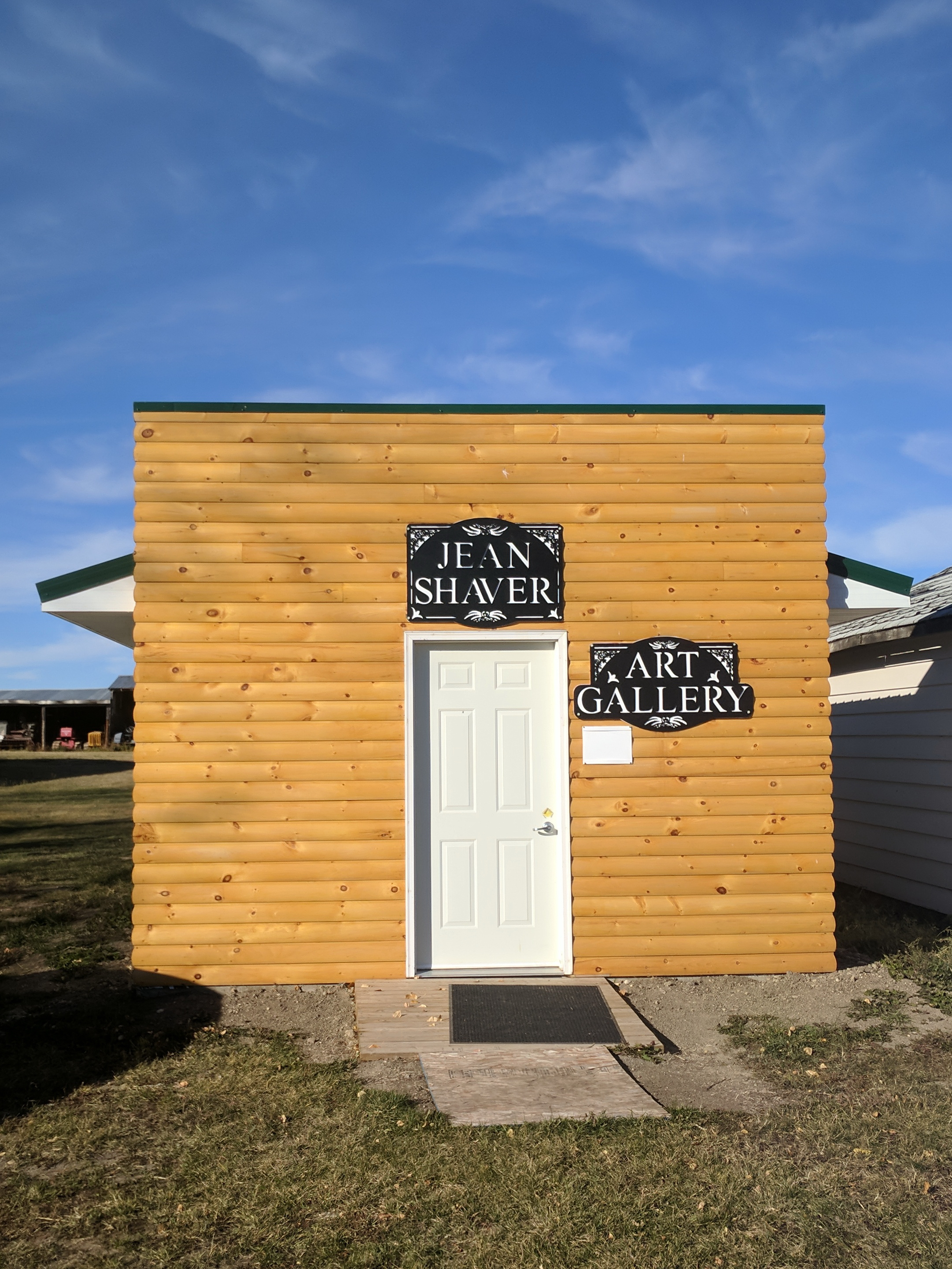
Jean Shaver Art Gallery

The museum was first organized in 1977 by interested persons from Ogema, Pangman, Bengough, Avonlea and other districts. These individuals felt the need to preserve the history and heritage of the local community. Land was purchased near the outskirts of town. Over the past 30 years, the museum has accumulated over 30 restored buildings and over 1,000 pieces of farm equipment. Its hundreds of thousands of artifacts and items make it the largest community owned museum in Western Canada. An annual "Museum Day" is held during the second Sunday in July. This event offers blacksmith, threshing and rope making demonstrations as well as a parade and musical entertainment. Many of the buildings in the museum have false fronts which were a common aesthetic characteristic of the early 1900s. The pioneer art of Jean Shaver (1887-1971), an artist who lived mostly outside Bengough, Saskatchewan, is housed in an art gallery at museum.

== Services ==
=== Deep South Animal Clinic ===
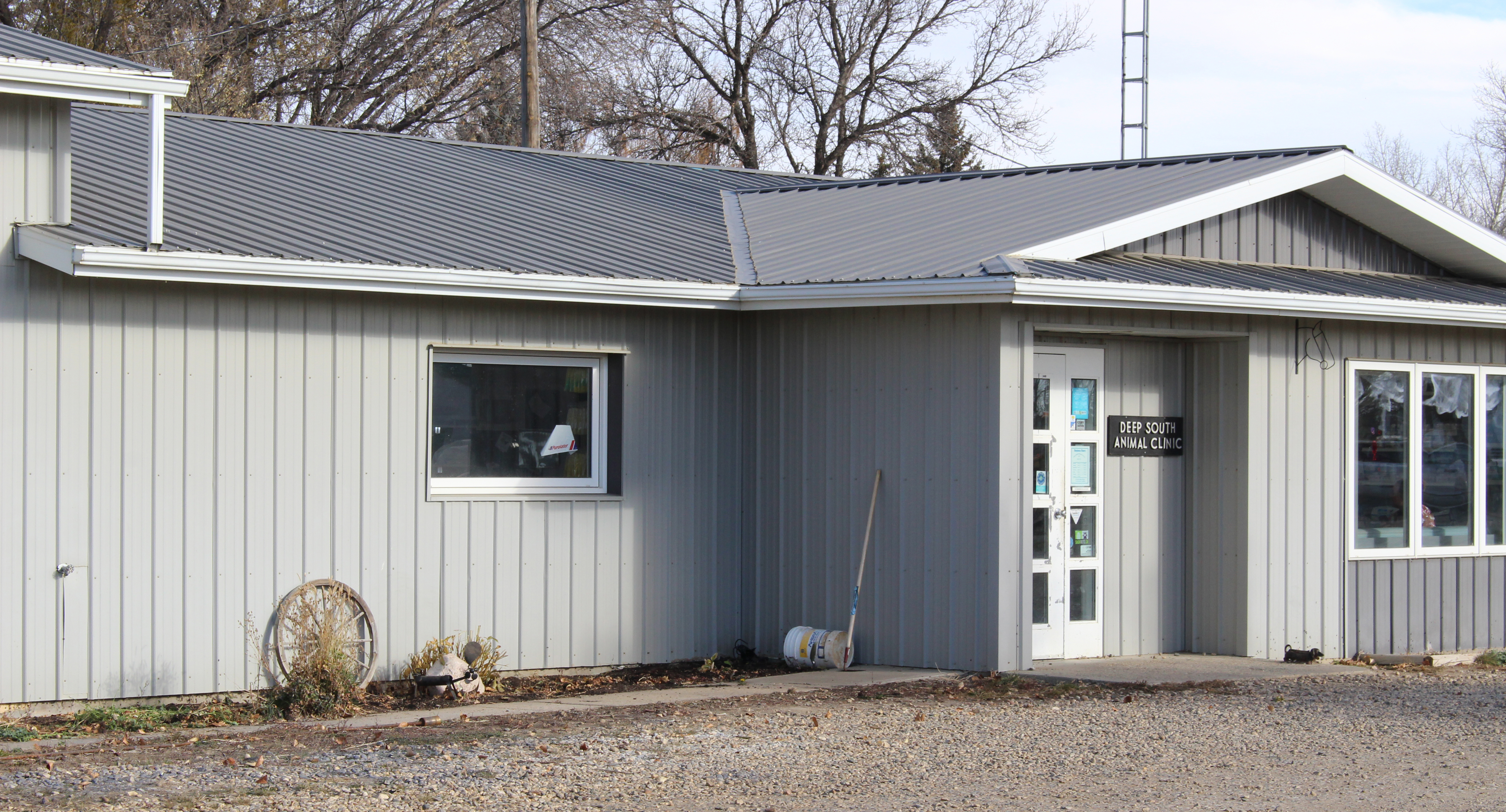
The Deep South Animal Clinic.

The Deep South Animal Clinic opened on August 15, 1973, in front of around 150 people. The 36' x 60' clinic cost $65,000 to build and was designed as an out-patient animal clinic, featuring multiple facilities. These facilities include an isolation area, operating areas for small & large animals, a hydraulic operating table for large animals, a kennel, laboratory, post-mortem room, office, and a reception area.

The Ogema district veterinary board opened the clinic with a grant of $25,000 from the provincial Government of Saskatchewan, and a $11,000 grant from the federal Government of Canada, under the local initiatives program, while the board paid the remainder. A district farmer, Wilfred Edworthy, officially unlocked the clinic at the opening ceremony. Today, the Deep South Animal Clinic provides service to Ogema and surrounding areas, including Weyburn, Regina, Moose Jaw, and Assiniboia. The clinic is open year-round for 24-hour emergency services.

==== Ogema Hospital ====
In 1949, a building committee began with a $20,000 donation, and a desire to get permission to build a 15-bed hospital. The people of Ogema wanted a hospital for many reasons. The people wanted their own way to care for the ill, because they did not want to rely on city hospitals or the one nearby in Bengough, due to certain roads not being safe for travel, and also because some of the ill would not be able to travel to those hospitals.

In 1959, after 10 years, many hours of fundraising, construction, and delays, the hospital still had not opened its doors. Although the building was not quite complete, the Health Minister, J. Walter Erb, deemed the building to be already out of date, and not fit to be a hospital.

Eventually the project came to an end, and today, Ogema still does not have a hospital within the town.

=== Banks ===
==== The Royal Bank ====
In 1989 the Royal Bank in Ogema was fully renovated, which included expanding the building with a 20' x 40' addition, and constructing a wheelchair ramp. During these renovations, the bank was also fully computerized and modernized.

In 1990 the Royal Bank celebrated its 80th anniversary in Ogema. The bank is also active in community events, especially by sponsoring various awards, and participating in the annual fair.

==== Radius Credit Union ====
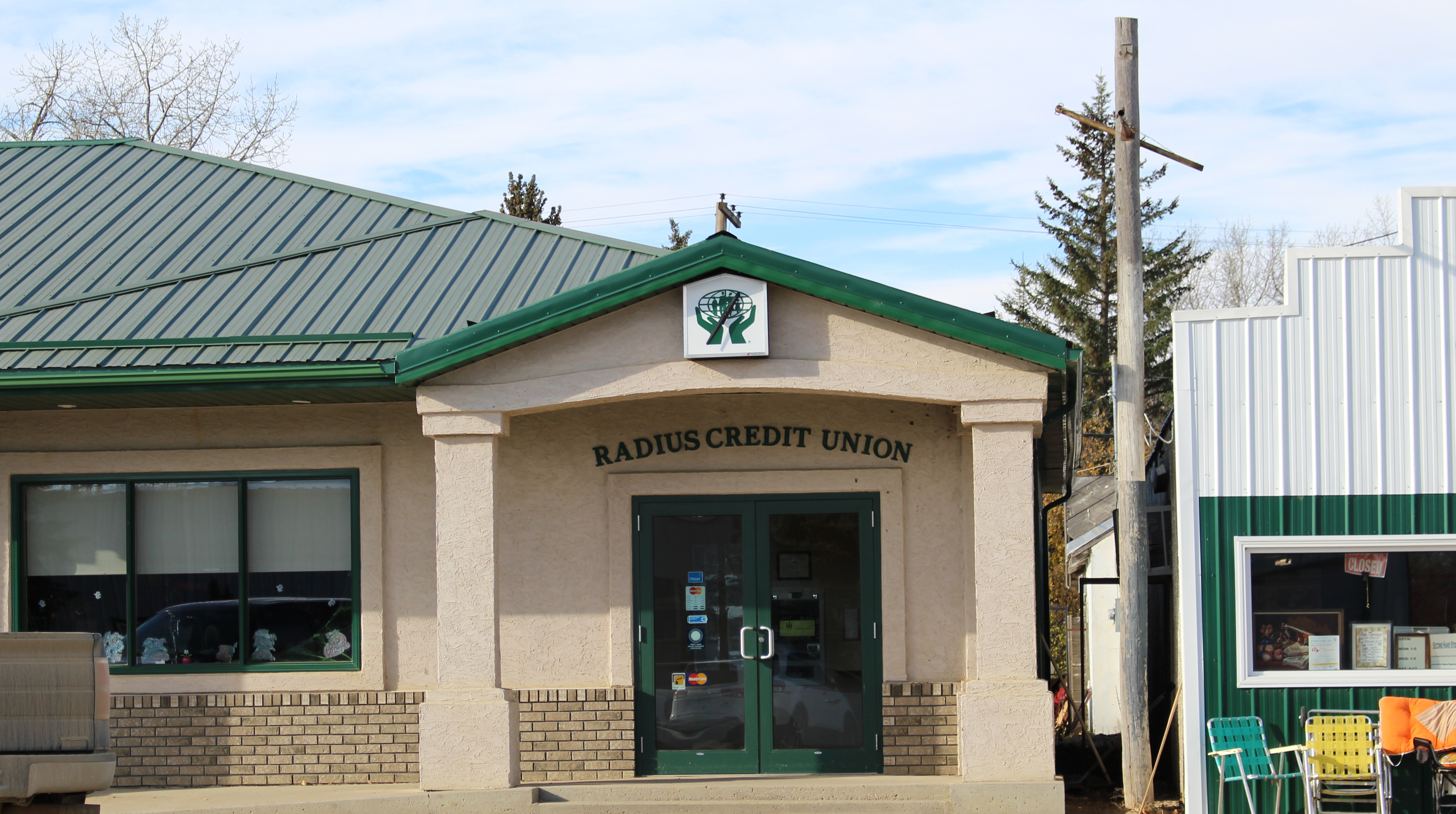
The Radius Credit Union

In 1984 the Radius Credit Union in Ogema decided to computerize. With computerization came new products including Mastercard product lines and automated tellers. At the same time registered retirement savings plans, registered retirement income funds, interest bearing chequing, youth accounts, and some insurance services were emerging.

In 1987, it became clear that the Credit Union would either have to renovate the existing building, or move into a new one. After looking at the decisions of other Credit Unions with similar problems, they decided to renovate, and early in 1988, the Board of Directors sent out letters to all the local tradesmen with the renovation plan. In the fall of 1988, the newly renovated Credit Union had its grand opening.

=== Other services ===
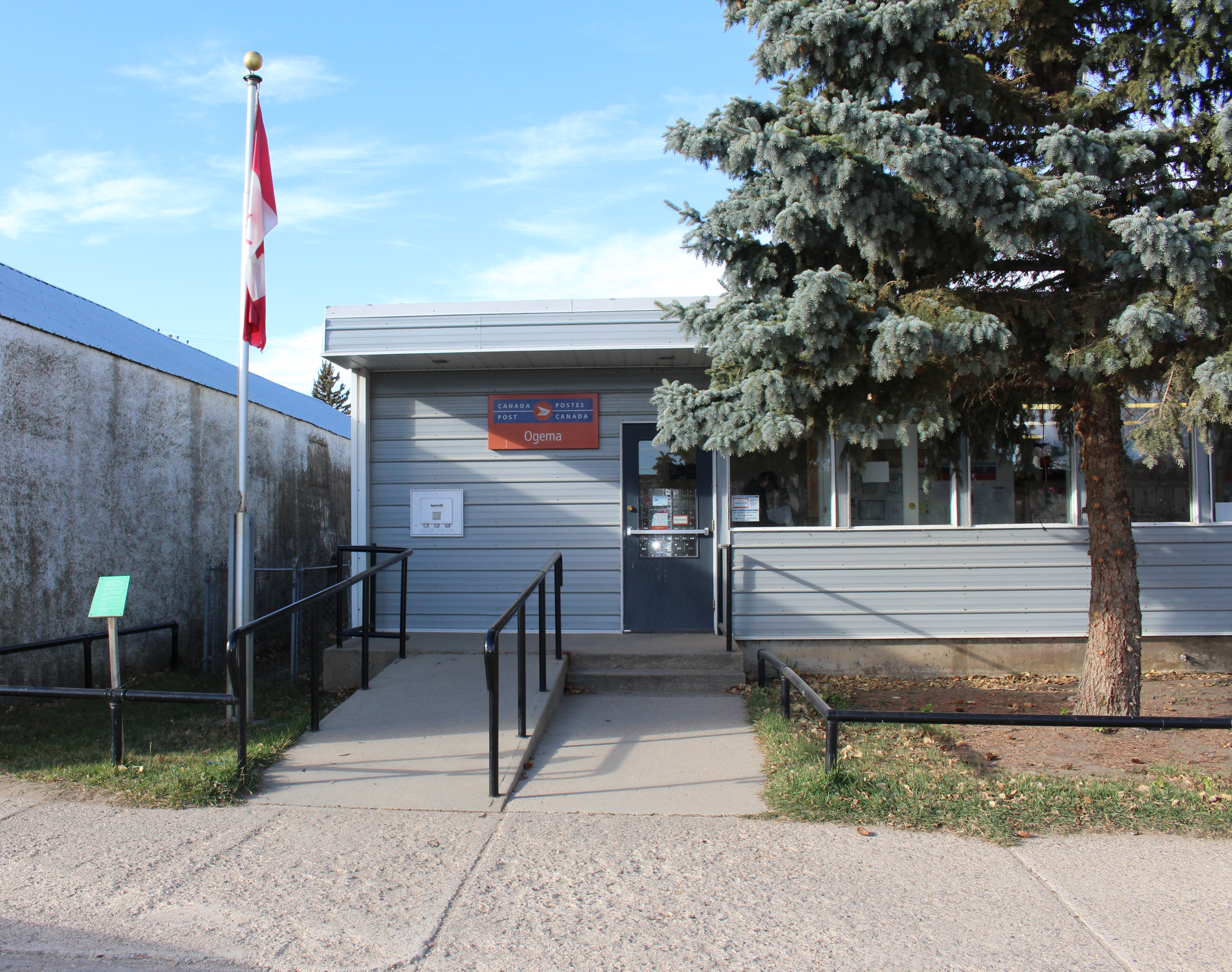
The Ogema Post Office

Other services in Ogema include a library post office.

== Business and industry ==
Mr. T.M. Gamble wrote a letter in 1913 describing the town. "Ogema has the appearance of a very busy and energetic little town, it is fortunate in having many citizens of good standing with marked ability for developing a town. It has no less than seven stores, one bank, a bakery, two large livery stables with the prospects of a third, four lumber yards, two others coming in, five machine companies, two flour and feed stores, one starting in business, no hotel but three restaurants, a number of offices and residential buildings."

=== Hotels ===
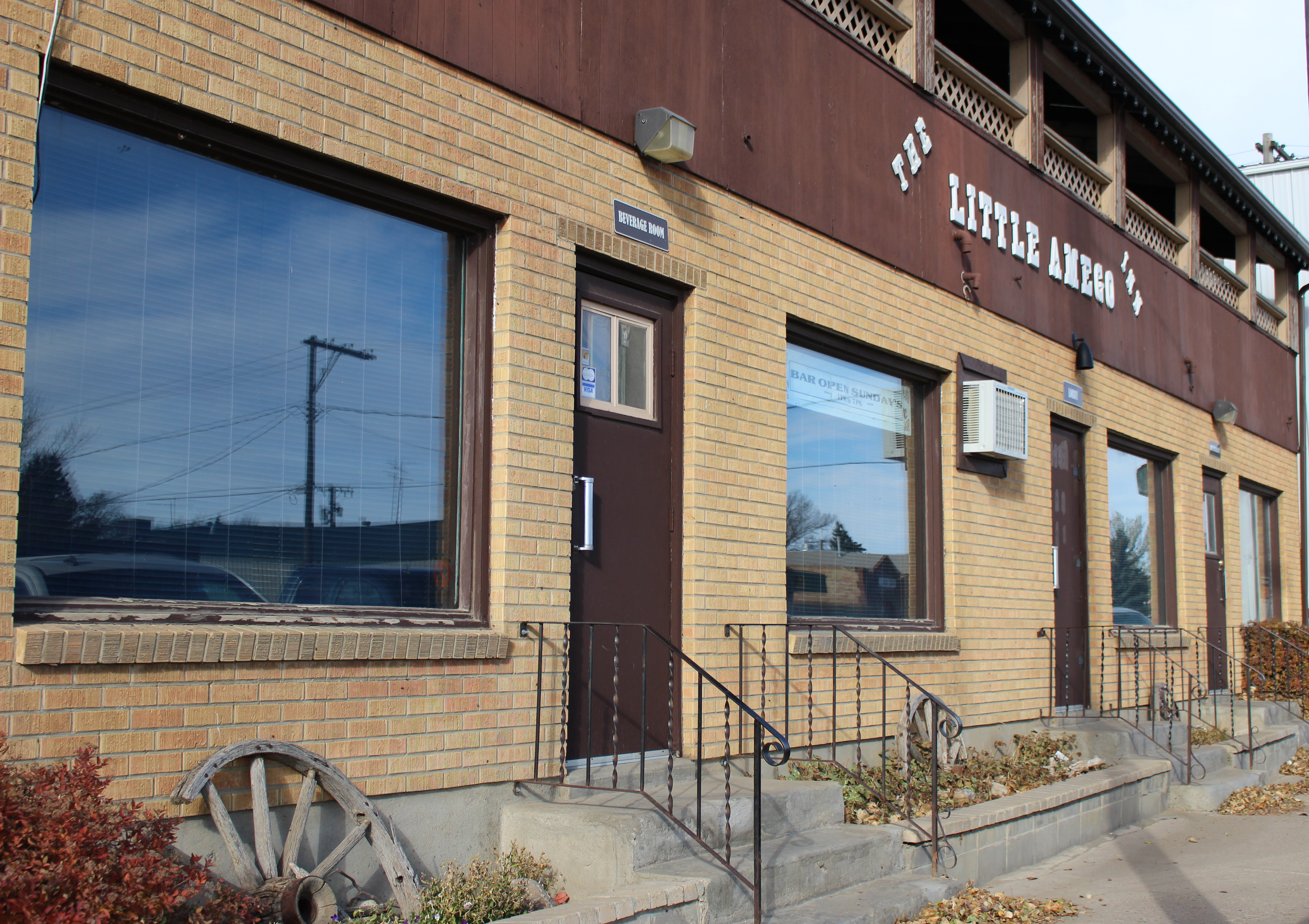
The Little Amego Inn

The Royal Hotel was built by Jake Nurnberger in 1910 on Railway Avenue, a two and a half storey building. Their dining room, the first in the town, was used by the railway construction crews, and later by the people arriving by train. Also in 1910, the Whittam Brothers built the Ogema Hotel, although this came to be used as an apartment building under the later ownership of Eddie Sadler. Then in 1914, T.H. West built the National Hotel.

There are currently two hotels in Ogema. The Little Amego Inn is at 306 Railway Avenue and has eight guest rooms, and the Ogema Motel is at 404 Railway Avenue and has fifteen guest rooms.

=== The Ogema Co-operative Association ===
The Ogema Co-operative Association was incorporated in 1940. Its original board of directors was President J. Scott Burns, F.J. Mead, A.E. Johnson, P.G. McGregor, C.W. Heron, A.D. Mc Phail, with C.B. Grainger as secretary and Roy Farr as the manager. Each of these members had to buy barrels of fuel and two five dollar shares. Although the business started out on the east side of the town, the tanks and shed moved in 1941 to a local farm, the Earl Farr farm. After the manager Roy Farr resigned, the Association wanted to move these back into the town, but the Wartime Prices and Trade Board did not allow it. After a period of inactivity, the Ogema Co-operative Association dissolved in 1954.

In 1940, the Bures Co-op was incorporated. This store was moved to the north side of Ogema in 1954, and four years later they bought a building in the centre of town, which they added on to. In 1988, a new store was built that was 40 feet by 80 feet for $60,630.00, and it officially opened on April 13, 1989. The name changed from Bures Co-op to Ogema Co-op in 1984 so people wouldn’t be confused about the store's location.

=== Big Sky Farms Inc. ===
In 2000, Big Sky Farms Inc. opened hog production facilities in Ogema, creating around 45 jobs in the community. The 188,000 square foot facility has space for 5,000 hogs and is the largest facility of its kind in Western Canada.

== Notable people ==
Notable people who were born, grew up in, or lived in Ogema

- Arleene Johnson (1924 - 2017), All American Girls Professional Baseball League Player
- Tasha Hubbard (born 1973), Film maker from Ogema known for her documentaries Birth of a Family and Two World's Colliding. After her adopted father died when she was two years old she, along with her adopted mother, moved to Ogema, Sask., where they lived until Hubbard was 11 years old, before moving around Saskatchewan with her adopted family.

== Media ==
Ogema is currently serviced by the Deep South Star.

In the Provincial Archives of Saskatchewan, there is a copy of the South Country Times from 1931. It served Ogema and adjacent towns, villages and hamlets.

It gives an idea of newspapers of the time. Articles included:

"Card of Thanks"; Who was visiting: "Miss Muriel Reid spent the weekend with Miss Dorothy Geig at Horizon." Also, lost and found, depression relief efforts --"FRUIT VEGETABLES-- a carload of fruit and vegetables is expected in Ogema by the end of the week or the beginning of next." As well as wanted ads/rent ads, the latest on boy scouts, and a "Tax Sales List" with a description of property and the cost for each pieces. They were sold at an auction.

Newspapers were a main way to know what was happening in the town in the early 1900s.

== See also ==
- List of communities in Saskatchewan
- List of place names in Canada of Indigenous origin
