= Red Coat Road and Rail =

Shortline railway in Saskatchewan, Canada

Red Coat Road & Rail Ltd.
Overview
- Operator: Great Western Railway
- Headquarters: Regina, Saskatchewan
- Reporting mark: RCRR
- Locale: Saskatchewan
- Dates of operation: 1999–
- Predecessor: Canadian Pacific Railway

Technical
- Track gauge: 4 ft 8 1/2 in (1,435 mm) standard gauge

The Red Coat Road & Rail Ltd. (reporting mark RCRR) is a Canadian short line railway company operating on trackage in Saskatchewan. Red Coat Road & Rail Ltd. is a community owned short-line railways in Saskatchewan. The former Canadian Pacific Railway line from Pangman to Assiniboia, was purchased from CPR in 1999. Great Western Railway is contracted to operate the Red Coat Road & Rail.

The network consists of 115 km of its own trackage.
