= Big Muddy Badlands =

Badlands in southern Saskatchewan, Canada and northern Montana, United States

- Badlands
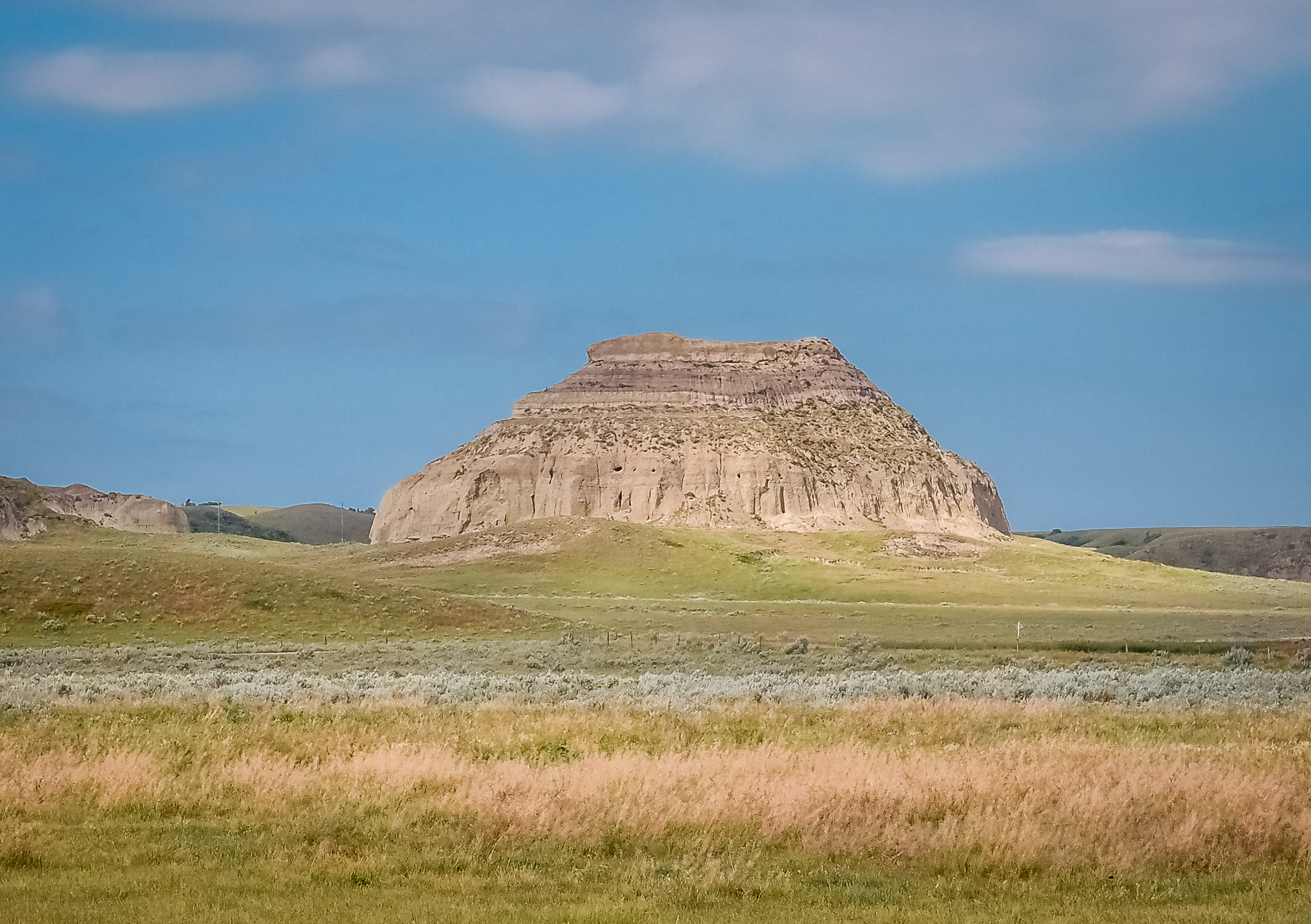
- Castle Butte

- Location within North America
- Coordinates: 49.2176°N 105.2191°W
- Location: Southern Saskatchewan and northern Montana
- Range: Missouri Coteau
- Part of: Big Muddy Valley
- Age: Last ice age
- Formed by: Big Muddy Creek

Dimensions
  - Length: 55 km (34 mi)
  - Width: 3.2 km (2.0 mi)
  - Depth: 160 m (520 ft)

The Big Muddy Badlands are a series of badlands in southern Saskatchewan, Canada, and northern Montana, United States, in the Big Muddy Valley and along Big Muddy Creek. Big Muddy Valley is a cleft of erosion and sandstone that is 55 kilometres (34 mi) long, 3.2 kilometres (2.0 mi) wide, and 160 metres (520 ft) deep.

The Big Muddy Valley and Big Muddy Badlands were formed over 12,000 years ago near the end of the last ice age when a glacial lake outburst flood occurred from a pre-historic glacial lake located at present-day Old Wives Lake. Big Muddy Lake is a large salt lake at the heart of the badlands. Two other notable lakes, Willow Bunch Lake and Lake of the Rivers, are farther upstream in the valley.

A prominent feature of the badlands is Castle Butte (49.2175°N 105.2191°W), which is an outcrop of sandstone and compressed clay that protrudes above the valley floor. It has a height of 60 metres (200 ft) and a circumference of 500 metres (1,600 ft). It is located 19 kilometres (12 mi) south of Bengough on Highway 34, about halfway between Big Muddy Lake and Willow Bunch Lake. Due to its prominence, the butte was used as a landmark for Indigenous peoples, early settlers, and the North-West Mounted Police.

Jean Louis Legare Regional Park is a campground and golf course near Willow Bunch at the northern end of the valley.

Ranching and tourism are important industries in the sparsely populated area. Tours of the badlands are arranged from the nearby town of Coronach.

== Historic Places ==
=== Sam Kelly sites ===
In the 19th and early 20th century, the Badlands formed the northern end of the "Outlaw Trail", a series of trails and stopping areas utilized by outlaws in the American West spanning from Canada to Mexico. Outlaws such as Henry Borne and his brother Coyote Pete, Sam Kelly, the Pigeon Toed Kid, and the notorious Sundance Kid turned up in the area.

In 1999, 256 ha (630 acres) of land was set aside as the Sam Kelly Sites (49.0069°N 105.001°W) in the Canadian part of the badlands and put on the Canadian Register of Historic Places. The historical site contains nine archaeological sites, including stone rings and effigies, caves, and homestead remains.

=== Buffalo Effigy ===
The Buffalo Effigy (49.0167°N 105.1888°W) was constructed by local Indigenous people from fieldstone overlooking West Beaver Creek near the border with Montana. The 64-hectare site was formally recognized in 1999. Besides the Buffalo Effigy, there is a stone cairn and at least eight stone rings.

=== Minton Turtle Effigy ===
The Minton Turtle Effigy (49.1874°N 104.7469°W) is located on a hill overlooking Big Muddy Badlands and Big Muddy Lake. The effigy is 41.98 m (137.7 ft) long and 26.07 m (85.5 ft) wide. It was first identified by Thomas Kehoe in 1965. He believed it represented a turtle; however, others, including Indigenous elders, believe it represents a badger. The site is a protected area and is fenced off with an informative plaque describing the turtle.

== Important Bird Areas ==
Within the Big Muddy Valley and Badlands are four Important Bird Areas of Canada covering five salt lakes and almost 400 km^{2} (150 sq mi) of habitat. All four sites are important for the nationally endangered piping plover.

- Alkali Lake (SK 016) (49.0001°N 104.3005°W) at only 4.98 km^{2} (1.92 sq mi) is the smallest IBA in the valley. The IBA is located at the eastern edge of the Big Muddy Badlands and encompasses the small Alkali Lake that straddles the border with Montana. Alkali Lake is known as "Salt Lake" on the Montana side of the border.
- Coteau Lakes (SK 017) (49.0431°N 104.4921°W) covers two lakes – West and East Coteau Lakes – and a total area of 37.61 km^{2} (14.52 sq mi). West Coteau Lake has one dam and East Coteau Lake has four dams, all of which are used to control water levels. The East Coteau Lake has a sodium sulphate mine on its shore at Sybouts.
- Big Muddy Lake (and surroundings) (SK 018) (49.1501°N 104.8505°W) at 200 km^{2} (77 sq mi) is the largest IBA in the valley. It encompasses most of Big Muddy Lake and the surrounding landscape.
- Willow Bunch Lake (SK 020) (49.4582°N 105.5901°W) at 152.14 km^{2} (58.74 sq mi) is the second largest IBA in the valley. It has one of the three largest breeding concentrations of piping plovers in the Canadian Prairies.

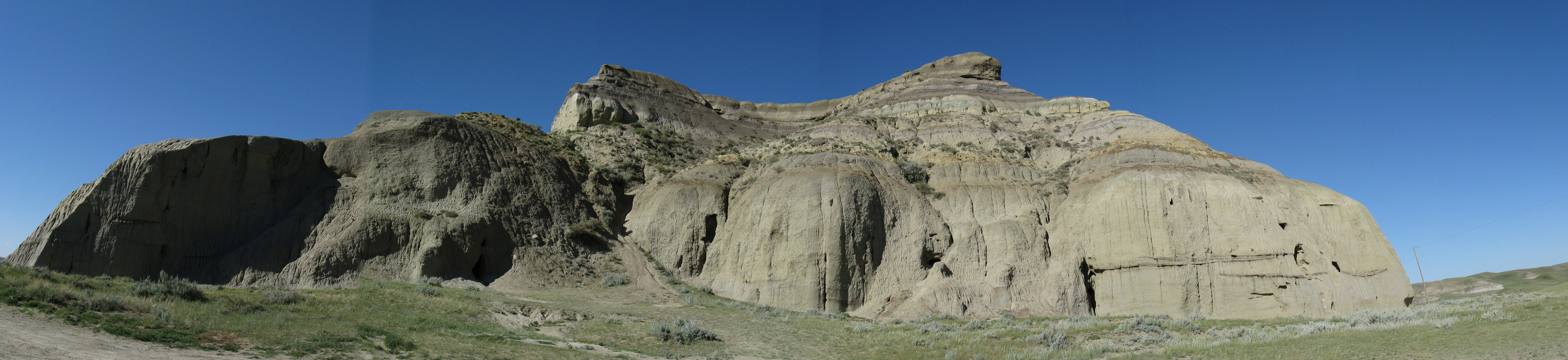
Panorama of Castle Butte

== Gallery ==
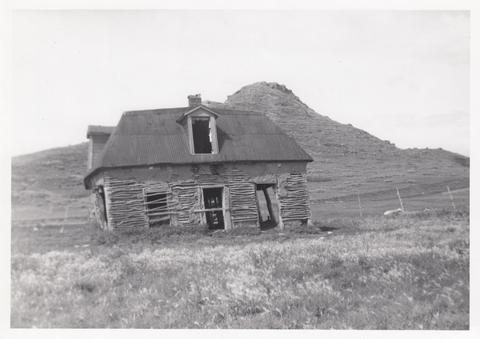
NWMP Post in the Big Muddy Badlands, c. 1902

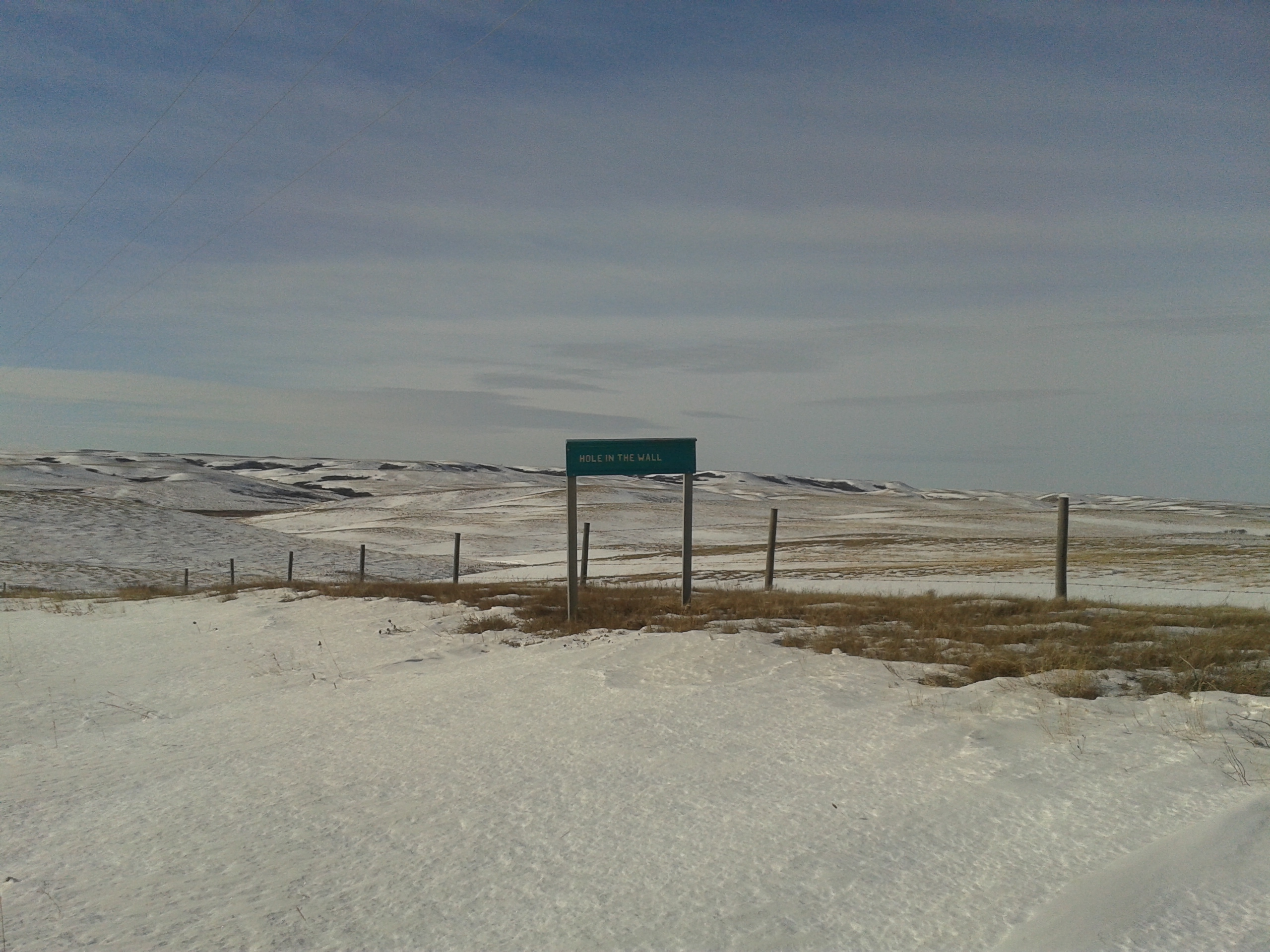
Entrance to Hole in the Wall Coulee

== See also ==
- Geography of Saskatchewan
- Geography of Montana
- History of Saskatchewan
- List of historic places in rural municipalities of Saskatchewan
- List of protected areas of Saskatchewan
