= Zec de la Rivière-Moisie =

- Location within Quebec
- Location: Canada, Quebec, Sept-Rivières Regional County Municipality
- Nearest city: Sept-Îles
- Coordinates: 50°11′34″N 66°05′42″W
- Established: 1993
- Governing body: "Association de protection de la rivière Moisie" (APRM)" and the "Camp de pêche de la rivière Moisie"

The Zec de la Rivière-Moisie (ZEC of Moisie River) is a "zone d'exploitation contrôlée" (controlled harvesting zone) (ZEC) in the city of Sept-îles in Sept-Rivières Regional County Municipality (MRC), in the administrative region of North Shore, in Quebec, in Canada.

"Zec de la Rivière-Moisie" is one of 22 controlled harvesting zone in Quebec dedicated to fishing salmon. It is run by two nonprofit organizations, mandated by the Government of Québec:

- The "Association de protection de la rivière Moisie (APRM)" (Association for the Protection of the river Moisie) (APRM) administers the first 19 miles of the Moisie River starting from the mouth;
- The "Camp de pêche de la rivière Moisie" (Fishing Camp of the river Moisie) administers the following eight kilometres upstream.

The fame of the river Moisie characterized a priori by its wild and natural environment. The panoramas of mountains and cliffs are superb. In addition, fish abound in this river and many specimens collected have a significant size.

== Geography ==
Located on the North Shore of St. Lawrence River, the Moisie River takes its source from water bodies of lakes Opocopa and Ménistouc, having an elevation of 520 metres (1,710 ft) above sea level. The main tributaries of the Moisie River are Pékans River which begins south of the Mont Wright (Quebec) and Nipissis River (deriving its source in Lake Wacouno). The watershed of the Moisie River is between that of St. Margaret River (west side) and Matamec River (east side).

The waters of the Moisie River descend to 410 km up to its mouth in the cove at Elzéar, 25 kilometres east of Sept-Îles, where the river empties into the St. Lawrence River. The waters of the cove flow into the St. Lawrence River to Moisie, Quebec between the "Pointe Moisie" and "East Point". This loop provides a safe haven to protect ships from heavy seas.

Just before its mouth, the river Moisie forms a large bend at 180 degrees for around two peninsulas:

- The first one that is oriented towards the East is 5.3 km long; a small hamlet called "Elbow-de-la-Rivière Moisie" is located at the tip of the peninsula. The Route 138 pass through the peninsula on the lengthwise;
- The second runs along the bank of the St. Lawrence River, lying to the west (the opposite of the first). This second peninsula begins to Matamec flats where there is a concentration area of waterfowl. Point Mercier is located at the western end of the peninsula.

Going up the river Moisie after crossing the cove at Elzéar great bend and crossed the river, boaters encounter pits Pomeroy (km 20) Hatchery (24.3 km) and Royal (25.3 km). At km 30.1, boaters pass under the railway bridge connecting Sept-Îles to Wabush and Labrador City, which will run along the river (east side) up towards the north. Boaters then enter the Matamec Ecological Reserve. Then, boaters crossing "Basin" and "Rapids of 12th Mille" at km 31.7. Above, boaters crossing the mouth of the "Big Creek Mercier" in the 42 km upriver Still, boaters face "Pointe de la Fourche" (at km 54). While at kilometre 59.9, boaters encounter zone "Falls".

This river is deep at the bottom of a narrow valley, usually surrounded by high mountains. The Montagnais still use the river as a route into that territory.

The river has a rapid because of the sudden drop in its path flow; it has several waterfalls and rapids. The river also has several pits suitable for bolting and retention of salmon.

== Salmon fishing ==
Areas of the river are:

- Area 1, which covers ten kilometres downstream from the bridge of the Route 138, in the estuarine area of the river;
- Area 2, which is upstream from the bridge of the Route 138. There are 19 pools spread over eight kilometres;
- Winthrop-Campbell area (upstream of ZEC), with a length of four kilometres. With 14 pools, this sector is the only one with quota.

Although fishing rights belong to the "Camp's fishing river Moisie" they are administered by the APRM under a renewable agreement from year to year. The Fishing Camp holds the exploitation rights to eight kilometers, being the owner of the riverbed. On public lands upstream, fishing rights are leased to five outfitters: Moisie-Nipissis, Camp Messnak, Moisie-Ouapetec, Moisie-Water-Gold and Upper Moisie.

Subsistence fishing is practised in Sector 2 of the ZEC by Montagnais of Uashat and Maliotenam. The downstream part of the river is easily accessible either via the ZEC and the "Camp's fishing of river Moisie". Users can access the upstream sectors by air. Fishing in the ZEC and the Winthrop-Campbell sector practice only from a river boat.

According rensencement aquatic wildlife species twelve fish live in the watershed of the Moisie River. In addition to the Atlantic salmon, these species are lake trout, the brook trout, the char on suckers on sucker red on gaspereau, the sea lamprey, burbot, pike, the stickleback and eel d'Amérique.

== Toponymy ==
Montagnais nicknamed 'Mistashipu', meaning "great river".

The name "ZEC River Moisie" was formalized on June 25, 1987 at the Bank of place names in the Commission de toponymie du Québec (Geographical Names Board of Québec).

== See also ==
- Sept-Îles, city
- Sept-Rivières Regional County Municipality (MRC)
- North Shore, administrative region of Quebec
- Moisie River
- Moisie, village
- Matamec Ecological Reserve
- Zone d'exploitation contrôlée (Controlled harvesting zone) (ZEC)
