= Taitaipenistouc Meanders Biodiversity Reserve =

Protected area in Quebec

- Réserve de biodiversité des Méandres-de-la-Taitaipenistouc
- Location within Quebec
- Nearest city: Fermont, Quebec
- Coordinates: 51.7686°N 65.9745°W
- Area: 32,653 ha (126.07 sq mi)
- Authorized: 10 November 2006

The Taitaipenistouc Meanders Biodiversity Reserve (French: Réserve de biodiversité des Méandres-de-la-Taitaipenistouc) is a biodiversity reserve in the Côte-Nord region of Quebec. It preserves the biodiversity of part of the watershed of the Taitaipenistouc River in the upper part of the Moisie River basin.

== History ==
The government of Quebec in 2002 protected part of the watershed of the Taitaipenistouc River, banning activities such as mining, forestry and hydroelectric development. On 19 June 2003 the territory was given the legal status of proposed biodiversity reserve with the provisional name of Lake Bright-Sand Biodiversity Reserve (Réserve de biodiversité projetée du lac Bright Sand). However, Lake Bright Sand itself is outside the proposed reserve, along the railway to the north of Poste Montagnais.

In 2005 the Bureau d’audiences publiques sur l'environnement (BAPE) was tasked with holding public consultations on the proposed Moisie River Aquatic Reserve and the proposed Lake Bright Sand, Lake Pasteur and Lake Gensart biodiversity reserves. In its report of 10 November 2006 BAPE recommended permanent protection for the Lake Bright Sand reserve, renamed the Taitaipenistouc Meanders Biodiversity Reserve. A conservation plan was drawn up by the Ministry of Sustainable Development, Environment, and Fight Against Climate Change (MELCC) and published in 2018.

== Location ==
The Taitaipenistouc Meanders Biodiversity Reserve is in the unorganized territory of Rivière-Nipissis. It is in the northeast of the Sept-Rivières Regional County Municipality, to the east of the Quebec North Shore and Labrador Railway and southeast of Poste Montagnais. The reserve is about 20 kilometres (12 mi) from the border with Labrador. It is 117 kilometres (73 mi) southeast of Fermont, 161 kilometres (100 mi) northeast of Sept-Îles and 15 kilometres (9.3 mi) east of the proposed Moisie River Aquatic Reserve.

The proposed reserve was to cover 278 square kilometres (107 sq mi). After adjustments to better protect the watershed and to make it easier to identify the boundaries based on rivers or lake shores, the reserve was given an area of 326.53 square kilometres (126.07 sq mi). Elevations range from 584 to 766 metres (1,916 to 2,513 ft), with an average elevation of 636 metres (2,087 ft). There is no road access, but float planes can land on several of the lakes, and in winter the reserve is accessible by snowmobile.

== Terrain ==
The reserve protects a typical region of the Lake Brûlé / Lake Fournier plateau. This is a huge plateau with rolling plains covered in drumlins, moraines, till, bogs and lakes. Most of the Taitaipenistouc Meanders Biodiversity Reserve is in the Taitaipenistouc drainage basin. The Taitaipenistouc River enters the reserve from the north and flows south through the reserve before turning to the northwest and leaving the reserve to join the Caopacho River. The Caopacho in turn flows south to join the Moisie River. Parts of the east and south of the reserve drain into the watershed of the Nipissis River, another tributary of the Moisie River.

The reserve is in the Grenville geologic province, with basement rocks consisting mainly of metamorphic gneiss and paragneiss. There is some mafic bedrock in north of the reserve, including diorite and gabbro. The reserve is covered by a set of drumlins formed by glacial action. The floor of the Taitaipenistouc river contains fluvioglacial deposits of sand and gravel. Apart from the Strahler 4 Taitaipenistouc river, the reserve is mostly drained by headwater streams. There are about 20 small lakes, covering 6% of the reserve.

== Ecology ==
The reserve has a cold, sub-polar and sub-humid continental climate. Vegetation has a short growing season. The bottom of the Taitaipenistouc river valley and some depressions hold peat bogs, which cover 20% of the reserve. The higher ground in almost 20% of the reserve holds old-growth softwood stands dominated by black spruce (Picea mariana). About 4% of the reserve has been disturbed by forest fires and is now occupied by jack pine (Pinus banksiana). Dry heaths on the steeper slopes and rocky outcrops of the peaks cover the remaining half the reserve, with shrubs, flowering plants, grasses, lichens, but hardly any trees. In 2013 a major forest fire affected half the reserve, so the above description may be inaccurate.

== Activities and restrictions ==
The whole of the reserve is in the Saguenay beaver reserve, where the e Uashat mak Mani-Utenam Innu community has special hunting and trapping rights. The only land right that has been granted is for one vacation cottage on the lake at the north tip of the reserve. The reserve is crossed by two power transmission lines with a total length of 10.5 kilometres (6.5 mi). Prohibited activities since the area became a proposed biodiversity reserve include mining, drilling for oil and gas, forestry and power development. There are restrictions on any type of activity that may affect the natural environment, such as introducing new species, changing the water drainage, using fertilizers and so on. However, the reserve may be visited and the visitors are allowed to make fires and build rough shelters.

== Sources ==
- Conservation Plan, Réserve de biodiversité des Méandres-de-laTaitaipenistouc (PDF), Gouvernement du Québec, Ministère de l’Environnement et de la Lutte contre les changements climatiques, Direction des aires protégées., 2018
- Lac Bright Sand (in French), Ressources naturelles Canada
- MRC de Sept-Rivières (PDF) (map) (in French), Gouvernement du Québec, 23 August 2006
- Proposed Bright Sand lake biodiversity reserve Conservation plan, Government of Quebec, 20 March 2008
- Rivière Caopacho (in French), Ressources naturelles Canada
- Rivière Taitaipenistouc (in French), Ressources naturelles Canada
