= Rivière à Dupuis =

Location
- Country: Canada
- Province: Quebec
- Region: Côte-Nord
- Regional County Municipality: Sept-Rivières Regional County Municipality

Physical characteristics
- Source: Unidentified lake
  - location: Rivière-Nipissis
  - coordinates: 50°35′59″N 65°37′52″W
  - elevation: 532 m
- Mouth: Chiskal River
  - location: Rivière-Nipissis
  - coordinates: 50°35′53″N 65°33′58″W
  - elevation: 253 m
- Length: 18.2 km (11.3 mi)

Basin features
- Progression: Bouleau River, Gulf of Saint Lawrence
- Tributaries
  - left: (upward from the mouth) Three discharges of lakes.
  - right: (upward from the mouth) Two discharges from lakes, stream (coming from the southwest), two discharges from lakes.

The Rivière à Dupuis is a tributary of the Chiskal River, flowing in the unorganized territory of Rivière-Nipissis, in the Sept-Rivières Regional County Municipality, in the administrative region of Côte-Nord, in the province of Quebec (Canada).

== Geography ==
The course of the Dupuis river generally descends towards the south-east, between the Petite rivière au Bouleau (located on the west side) and the Bouleau River (located on the east side).

The Dupuis river takes its source from an unidentified lake (length: 0.9 km (0.56 mi); altitude: 532 m (1,745 ft)), in the unorganized territory of Rivière-Nipissis. The mouth of the head lake is located at the end of a bay southeast of the lake, either at:

- 4.3 km (2.7 mi) southwest of a bend in the Chiskal River;
- 20.4 km (12.7 mi) southeast of a bay in Nipisso Lake;
- 68.1 km (42.3 mi) northeast of downtown Sept-Îles.

From the head lake, the course of the river at Dupuis descends on 18.2 km (11.3 mi), with a drop of 279 m (915 ft), according to the following segments:

- 3.1 km (1.9 mi) towards the south, in particular crossing a lake (length: 1.5 km (0.93 mi); altitude: 530 m (1,740 ft)), up to a bend river corresponding to a stream (coming from the west);
- 1.3 km (0.81 mi) towards the northeast, crossing an unidentified lake (length: 0.94 km (0.58 mi); altitude: 492 m (1,614 ft)), up to at its mouth;
- 13.8 km (8.6 mi) towards the northeast almost in a straight line, collecting the discharge (coming from the north) of three lakes, the discharge (coming from the southwest) of two lakes and the discharge (coming from the northwest) of a lake, as well as down the mountain, to its mouth.

The Dupuis river flows into a bend in the river on the west bank of the Bouleau river. This confluence is located at:

- 1.0 km (0.62 mi) west of the course of the Bouleau river;
- 16.6 km (10.3 mi) north-east of the course of the Matamec River;
- 66.6 km (41.4 mi) west of the center of the village of Rivière-au-Tonnerre;
- 71.6 km (44.5 mi) northeast of downtown Sept-Îles.

From the confluence of the river at Dupuis, the current descends the course of the Chiskal river on 2.8 km (1.7 mi), then the course of the Bouleau river on 39.1 km (24.3 mi) towards the south, to the north shore of the estuary of Saint Lawrence.

== Toponymy ==
The term "Dupuis" turns out to be a family name of French origin.

The toponym "rivière à Dupuis" was made official on December 5, 1968.

== See also ==
- List of rivers of Quebec
