= Moisie =

Moisie may refer to:

- Moisie River, Quebec
- Moisie, Quebec a village at the mouth of the Moisie river
- Zec de la Rivière-Moisie, a zone d'exploitation contrôlée (controlled harvesting zone) (zec)
