= Chiskal River =

Location
- Country: Canada
- Province: Quebec
- Region: Côte-Nord
- Regional County Municipality: Sept-Rivières Regional County Municipality

Physical characteristics
- Source: Unidentified lake
  - location: Rivière-Nipissis
  - coordinates: 50°44′18″N 65°38′56″W
  - elevation: 681 m
- Mouth: Bouleau River
  - location: Rivière-Nipissis
  - coordinates: 50°28′59″N 65°32′55″W
  - elevation: 246 m
- Length: 31.3 km (19.4 mi)

Basin features
- Tributaries
  - left: (upward from the mouth) discharge of a lake, six streams, Zéphirin stream, Chisholm stream, discharge of a set of lakes, discharge of a lake, discharge of a set of lakes (via the lake ?), discharge of a set of lakes (via the lake ?).
  - right: (upward from the mouth) Rivière à Dupuis, discharge from a mountain lake, discharge from a mountain lake, discharge (coming from the west), 4 streams, 5 streams.

The Chiskal River is a tributary of the Bouleau River, flowing in the unorganized territory of Nipissis River, in the Sept-Rivières Regional County Municipality, in the administrative region of Côte-Nord, in the province of Quebec, Canada.

== Geography ==
The course of the Chiskal river generally descends towards the south-east, between the Petite rivière au Bouleau (located on the west side) and the rivière au Bouleau (located on the east side).

The Chiskal River takes its source from an unidentified lake (length: 0.6 km (0.37 mi); altitude: 681 m (2,234 ft)), in the unorganized territory of Rivière-Nipissis. This lake is mainly fed by the Chasse stream, the Lièvre stream and the Castor stream. The mouth of the head lake is located at the bottom of a narrow bay to the south-east of the lake, either at:

- 118.5 km (73.6 mi) south of the boundary between Labrador and Quebec;
- 9.95 km (6.18 mi) east of a bay in Lake Nipisso;
- 18.6 km (11.6 mi) northwest of the mouth of the Chiskal River;
- 77.9 km (48.4 mi) northeast of downtown Sept-Îles.

From the head lake, the course of the Chiskal river descends on 31.3 km (19.4 mi), with a drop of 395 m (1,296 ft), according to the following segments:

Upper course of the Chiskal river (segment of 18.2 km (11.3 mi))

- 10.8 km (6.7 mi) towards the south almost in a straight line, crossing 3 small lakes, then curving towards the south-east, until a bend in the river corresponding to the Zéphirin stream (coming from the east) and Chisholm Creek (coming from the north);
- 7.4 km (4.6 mi) towards the south in an increasingly deep valley, curving towards the south-east at the end of the segment, until the discharge (coming from the north-west) of a set lakes;

Lower course of the Chiskal river (segment of 13.1 km (8.1 mi))

- 8.3 km (5.2 mi) towards the east at the foot of a long mountain cliff (located on the south side) and forming a hook towards the south-east, until a bend in the river;
- 4.8 km (3.0 mi) towards the south-east in a widened valley, forming several coils, and collecting the discharge (coming from the south-west) of the rivière à Dupuis, until its mouth.

The Chiskal River flows into a bend on the west bank of the Birch River. This confluence is located at:

- 144 km (89 mi) south-west of the center of the village of Havre-Saint-Pierre;
- 65 km (40 mi) west of the center of the village of Rivière-au-Tonnerre;
- 71.4 km (44.4 mi) northeast of downtown Sept-Îles.

From the confluence of the Chiskal river, the current descends the course of the Bouleau river on 39.1 km (24.3 mi) towards the south, to the north shore of the estuary of Saint Lawrence.

== Toponymy ==
The toponym "rivière Chiskal" was made official on {December 5, 1968.

== See also ==
- Sept-Rivières Regional County Municipality
- Rivière-Nipissis, an unorganizec territory
- Bouleau River, a stream
- Rivière à Dupuis, a stream
- Estuary of Saint Lawrence
- List of rivers of Quebec
