= Moisie River Aquatic Reserve =

Proposed protected area in Côte-Nord, Quebec, Canada

- Réserve aquatique de la rivière Moisie
- IUCN category II (national park)
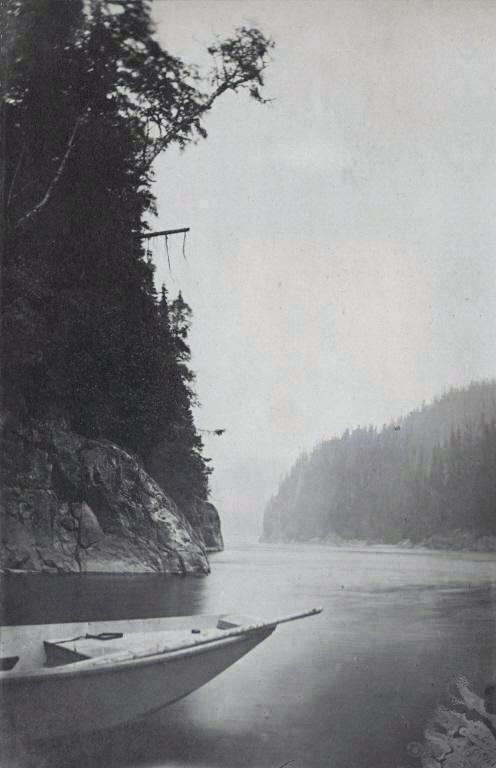
- Moisie River c. 1880

- Location within Quebec
- Location: Côte-Nord, Quebec, Canada
- Coordinates: 50.697°N 66.204°W
- Designation: Aquatic reserve (proposed)
- Administrator: Ministry of Sustainable Development, Environment, and Fight Against Climate Change

The Moisie River Aquatic Reserve (French: Réserve aquatique projetée de la rivière Moisie) is a proposed protected area in the Côte-Nord region of Quebec, Canada. It would protect the waters and surrounding lands of the 363 kilometres (226 mi) Moisie River. The Moisie is one of the largest rivers in the region, flows through dramatic unspoiled scenery and is an important Atlantic salmon river. Although the plan to create the reserve was announced in 2003, as of 2018 the local Innu communities had yet to give their consent.

== Background ==
The plan for the Moisie river aquatic reserve was officially announced by the Government of Quebec in February 2003. It would be the first aquatic reserve in Quebec, and the Moisie would become the first watercourse to the fully protected against any form of industrial exploitation. Measured by watershed, the Moisie would be the second largest protected river in southern Canada, after the Fraser River.

The reserve includes the Aux Pékans and Carheil rivers, tributaries of the Moisie that Hydro-Québec had been studying with a view to diverting them to the Sainte-Marguerite River basin to increase the energy that could be stored for the SM-3 plant. However, a commission of the Bureau of Public Hearings on the environment concluded that this was not economically justified, and could adversely affect the salmon population. In the end the government decided in favor of protecting the two tributaries.

In April 2018 it was reported that the negotiations between the Uashat-Maliotenam Council, the Department of Aboriginal Affairs and the Department of Forests, Wildlife and Parks on creating the aquatic reserve did not have the full support of the community. One of the councilors said the chief had not consulted enough with the community, and several people asked for a referendum if an agreement in principle was signed. The Matimekosh–Lac-John Innu should also be involved, since their ancestors had used the river in the past.

== Objectives ==
The goals are to conserve a representative river in the Manicouagan Reservoir Basin and Sainte-Marguerite River Plateau natural region, to protect the Atlantic salmon population, to protect biodiversity in the aquatic and riverbank ecosystems, to develop key elements in the landscape, to preserve the landscape visible from the bottom of the Moisie river valley and to acquire new knowledge on salmon ecology and on the natural heritage of the Moisie river.

Under the Natural Heritage Conservation Act, prohibited activities would include mining, and gas or petroleum development; exploration of underground resources that involves stripping, trenching, excavation or deforestation; forestry; industrial generation of hydroelectricity or other types of power; new vacation resorts; and earthwork, back-filling or construction work. Also, no activity would be allowed that would be likely to damage the bed, banks or shore of any water body or stream in the reserve.

== Location ==
The proposed Moisie river aquatic reserve is in the Côte-Nord region between 50°19' and 52°29' north and 65°58' and 67°33' west. The upstream portion is in the Caniapiscau Regional County Municipality and the downstream portion is in the Sept-Rivières Regional County Municipality. The river runs from north to south through the unorganized territories of Rivière-Mouchalagane, Rivière-Nipissis and Lac-Walker, and through the town of Moisie. The river mouth is on the north shore of the Estuary of Saint Lawrence about 25 kilometres (16 mi) east of the town of Sept-Îles, Quebec. The proposed reserve would cover 3,897.58 square kilometres (1,504.86 sq mi), following the main bed of the Moisie River from 37 kilometres (23 mi) to 358 kilometres (222 mi) from its mouth through a corridor 6 to 30 kilometres (3.7 to 18.6 mi) wide, including 115 kilometres (71 mi) of the Aux Pékans River.

== Terrain ==
The proposed aquatic reserve is in the Grenville Province of the Canadian Shield, in the foothills of a mountain range formed almost 1,000 million years ago, with high and low hills, mounds and hummocks. The bedrock is mostly gneiss and paragneiss, with some marble upstream, and small pockets of anorthosite and charnockite downstream. The surface is covered by a thin layer of glacial till upstream. Further down the surface is mostly covered in rock and peat. The bed of the Moisie river is composed of glaciofluvial sand and gravel. The highest elevation in the proposed reserve is 991 metres (3,251 ft), falling to 8 metres (26 ft) near the coast. The average elevation is 437 metres (1,434 ft).

The Moisie river rises in Ménistouc lake at an elevation of 520 metres (1,710 ft) and flows south for 363 kilometres (226 mi) to the Saint Lawrence Estuary. Its drainage basin covers 19,196 square kilometres (7,412 sq mi). It has nine tributaries that drain more than 300 square kilometres (120 sq mi). The largest are the Aux Pékans River in the north, draining 3,419 square kilometres (1,320 sq mi), and Nipissis River in the south, draining 4,196 square kilometres (1,620 sq mi). The river drops on average 1.4 metres per kilometre (7.4 ft/mi), with sections of rapids and waterfalls, and discharges 401 cubic metres per second (14,200 cu ft/s) on average of exceptionally clean water. Along most of its length it runs through deep gorges. The river flows through dramatic, unspoiled scenery and has not been dammed for hydroelectricity. It has great value as one of the last remaining examples of untamed rivers on the North Shore.

== Environment ==
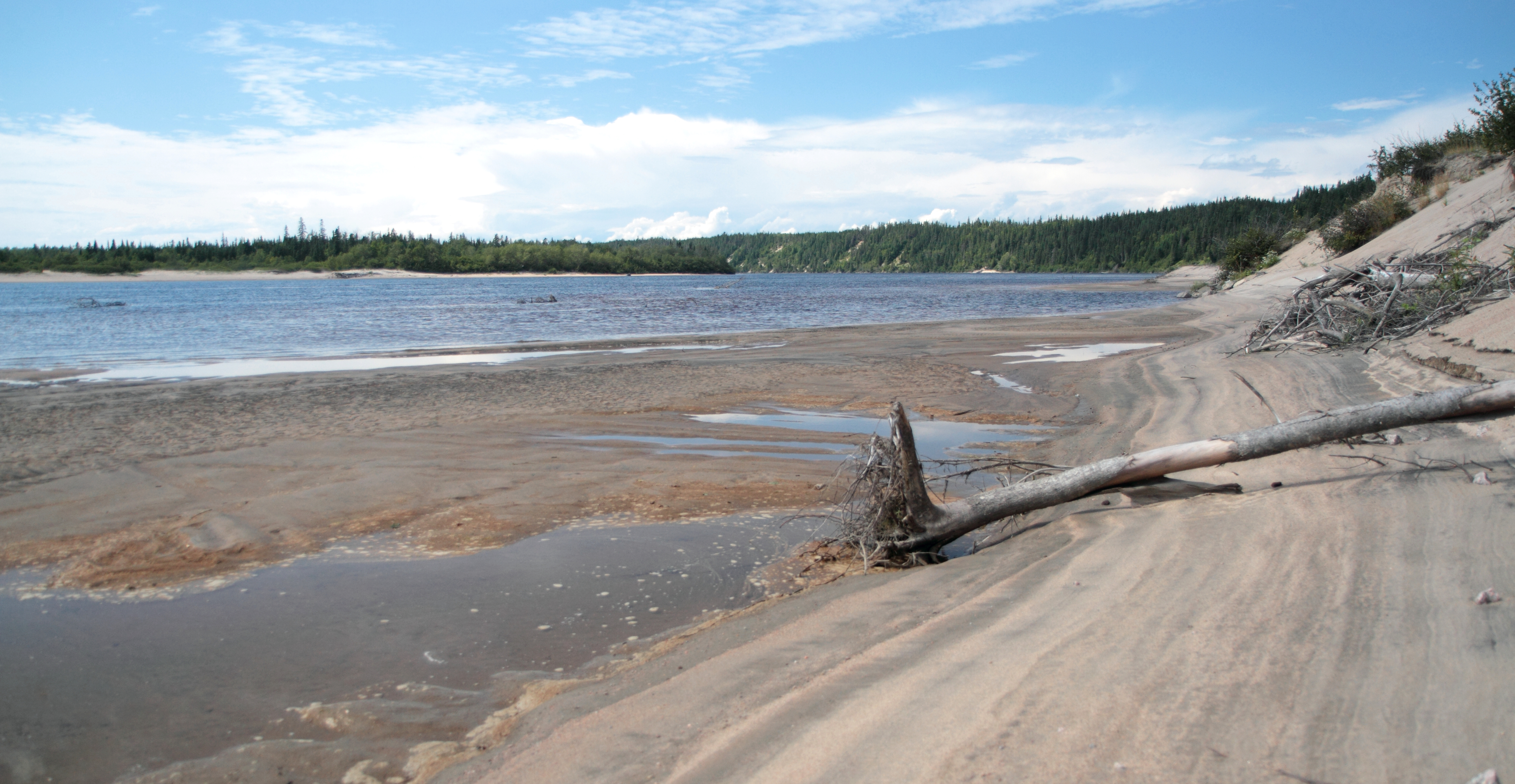
shore of the river

The area of the proposed reserve is in the Central Laurentian natural province, in the Manicouagan Reservoir Basin and the Sainte-Marguerite River Plateau natural regions. The climate is subarctic, subhumid in the north and south, and humid in the center. It is cold, with a short growing season in the north, and has a less severe climate with a longer growing period further south.

A map of the Ecological regions of Quebec shows the Aux Pékans River rising to the northwest of Fermont just west of the Spruce/lichen domain of the boreal zone. The Moisie itself rises and flows for most of its length through the eastern spruce/moss domain of the boreal zone. In the north, heath covers the steeper valley slopes. About a third of the proposed reserve is covered by forest. This mainly consists of stands of mature softwood. The most common species is black spruce (Picea mariana), often growing with balsam fir (Abies balsamea). Sandy terraces may hold jack pine (Pinus banksiana). There are a few mixed stands, in which the most common hardwood is paper birch (Betula papyrifera).

Near its mouth, south of the reserve, the river enters the eastern fir/white birch domain of the boreal zone.

== Salmon ==
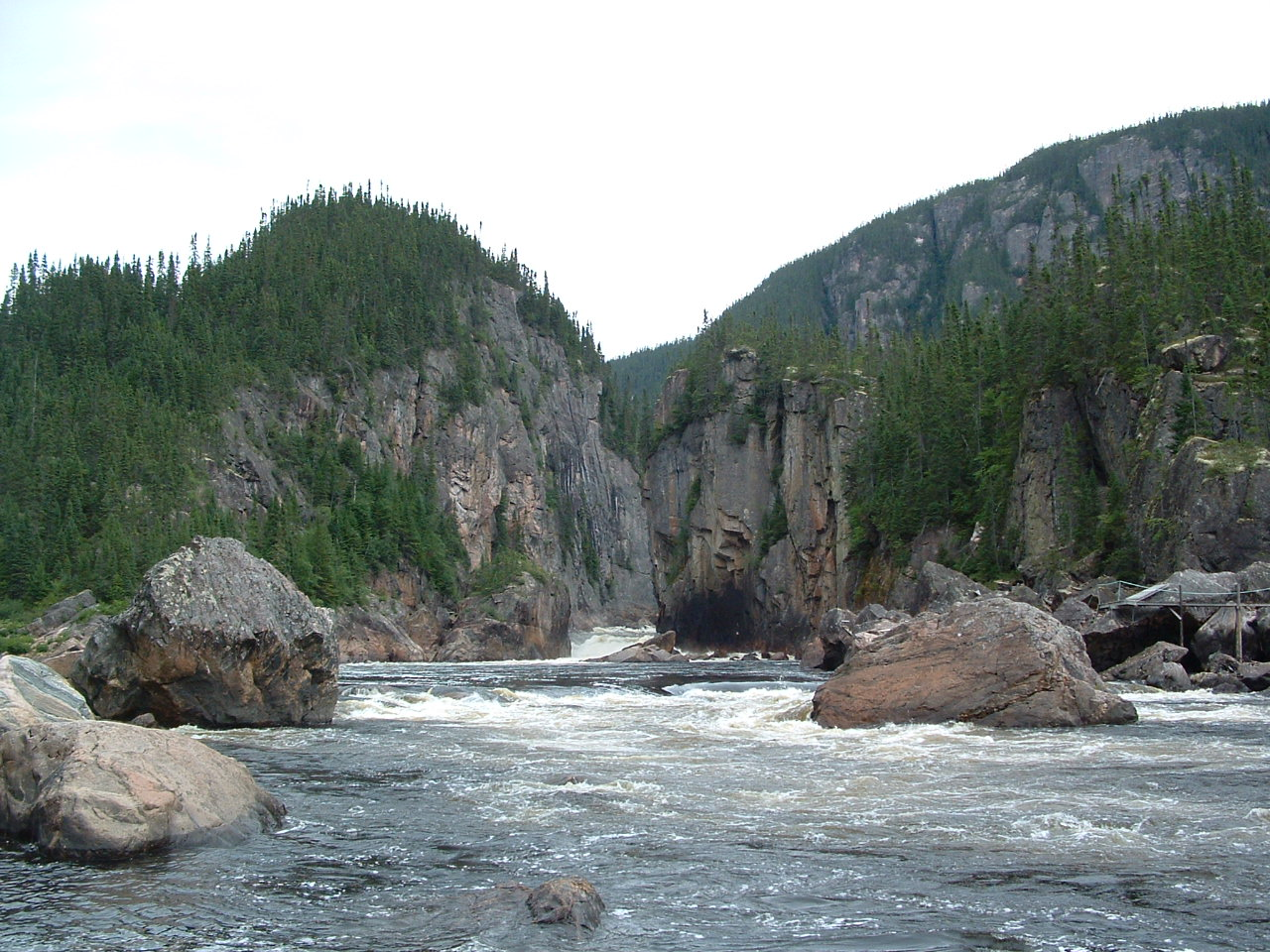
Katchapahun Fish Ladder on the Moisie

The Moisie river is known as an Atlantic salmon (Salmo salar) river, with catches averaging 7 kilograms (15 lb) in weight. Many of the fish spawning on the river have spent several seasons at sea. Some return to spawn for several years in a row. Salmon fishing is allowed on the lower 170 kilometres (110 mi) of the Moisie River, and on the south part of the Nipisso River. About 1,000 to 1,500 fish are caught each year, generating local economic benefits of about CDN$2 million. The population of Atlantic salmon is declining rapidly, both here and elsewhere.

== Human presence ==
Two electrical power lines cross the south of the proposed reserve. Almost all the proposed reserve is within the Saguenay beaver reserve, where the Innu people of the Innu Takuaikan Uashat Mak Mani-Utenam first nation have the right to hunt and trap fur bearing animals. There are four exclusive-right outfitting operations in the proposed reserve, covering 58.6 square kilometres (22.6 sq mi). There are 37 cottage leases, 15 leases for temporary forest shelters and 2 leases for trapping camps.

== Sources ==
- Conservation plan, Moisie River Aquatic Reserve, Quebec, February 2003
- " Manque de consultations " pour créer une réserve aquatique sur la rivière Moisie (in French), Radio Canada, 23 April 2018
- "Réserve aquatique de la Moisie", GrandeQuébec (in French)
- Saucier, J.-P.; Robitaille, A.; Grondin, P.; Bergeron, J.-F.; Gosselin, J. (2011), Les régions écologiques du Québec méridional (PDF) (map), 4 (in French), Ministère des Ressources naturelles et de la Faune

== External sources ==
- N'Binkéna Nantob-Bikatui (2011), Localisation du lac Carheil dans le bassin versant de la rivière Moisie (PDF) (Map showing the river and reserve) (in French), OBV Duplessis, archived from the original (PDF) on 2019-09-21
