= Carheil =

Carheil may refer to:

- Étienne de Carheil (1633–1726), French Jesuit priest who became a missionary to the Iroquois and Huron Indians in the New World
- Carheil Lake, lake in the Côte-Nord region of Quebec, Canada
- Carheil River, river in the Côte-Nord region of Quebec, Canada
