= Loups Marins River =

Loups Marins River Rivière aux Loups Marins
- Location within Quebec

Location
- Country: Canada
- Province: Quebec
- Region: Côte-Nord
- RCM: Sept-Rivières Regional County Municipality

Physical characteristics
- Mouth: Gulf of Saint Lawrence
  - coordinates: 50.259167°N 65.744444°W
  - elevation: 0 metres (0 ft)
- Basin size: 186 square kilometres (72 sq mi)

Loups Marins River (French: Rivière aux Loups Marins, Seal River) is a river in the Côte-Nord region of Quebec, Canada. It empties into the Gulf of Saint Lawrence.

== Location ==
The Loups Marins River rises on the Canadian Shield and flows south to the Saint Lawrence. The course of the river is dictated by fractures in the bedrock. The mouth of the river is in the municipality of Sept-Îles of the Sept-Rivières Regional County Municipality. The name was made official on 5 December 1968. Its origin is not known. The river's estuary is 2.1 miles (3.4 km) west of the Pointe à la Perche. It gives boats shelter from west winds. A wooden cross standing on the rocks marks the western entrance to the river's estuary, which has about 3 metres (9.8 ft) of water.

== Basin ==
The river basin cover 186 square kilometres (72 sq mi). It lies between the basins of the Matamec River to the west and the Pigou River to the east. The basin is partly in the unorganized territory of Rivière-Nipissis and partly in the municipality of Sept-Îles.

== Environment ==
A map of the ecological regions of Quebec shows the river in sub-regions 6j-T and 6m-T of the east spruce/moss subdomain. The hoary bat (Lasiurus cinereus), suspected of being threatened or vulnerable in the province, was observed between 1999 and 2000 in a forest of firs and alders on the west side of the Loups Marins River. The 9.18 square kilometres (3.54 sq mi) Waterfowl concentration area of Rivière aux Loups Marins, Île de la Grande Anse, designated an IUCN Category IV Water fowl gathering area in 1998, covers the east part of the river's estuary and the coastline east to the Île de la Grande Anse.

== Sources ==
- Aire de concentration d'oiseaux aquatiques de la Rivière aux Loups Marins, Île de la Grande Anse, Protected Planet
- Dubois, Jean-Marie M. (December 1979), Côte-Nord (PDF) (Thesis) (in French), University of Ottawa
- Instructions nautiques Fleuve Saint-Laurent Cap Whittle/Cap Gaspé aux Escoumins et île d'Anticosti (PDF) (in French) (3 ed.), Ministère des Pêches et des Océans, August 2019
- "Les escales sur la Côte Nord" (PDF), L'escale nautique (in French), no. 40
- Morneau, Marie-Michelle; Caron, Sébastien (June 2016), Portrait des milieux naturels de Sept-Îles (PDF) (in French), Corporation de protection de l'environnement de Sept-Îles (CPESI)
- Portrait préliminaire de la zone de gestion intégrée de l'eau par bassin versant Duplessis (PDF) (in French), OBV Duplessis, April 2015
- Rivière aux Loups Marins (in French), Commission de toponymie du Québec
- Rivière aux Loups Marins, Natural Resources Canada
- Rouillard, Eugène (1914), "Agwanus, (Rivière)", Dictionnaire des rivières et lacs de la province de Québec (in French), Québec. Département des terres et forêts
- Saucier, J.-P.; Robitaille, A.; Grondin, P.; Bergeron, J.-F.; Gosselin, J. (2011), Les régions écologiques du Québec méridional (PDF) (map), 4 (in French), Ministère des Ressources naturelles et de la Faune
