= Petite rivière au Bouleau =

Location
- Country: Canada
- Province: Quebec
- Region: Côte-Nord
- Regional County Municipality: Sept-Rivières Regional County Municipality

Physical characteristics
- Source: Unidentified lake
  - location: Rivière-Nipissis
  - coordinates: 50°40′23″N 65°45′06″W
  - elevation: 639 m
- Mouth: Bouleau River
  - location: Rivière-Nipissis
  - coordinates: 50°28′59″N 65°32′55″W
  - elevation: 185 m
- Length: 39.7 km (24.7 mi)

Basin features
- Tributaries
  - left: (upward from the mouth)
  - right: (upward from the mouth)

The Petite rivière au Bouleau (English: Little Bouleau River) is a tributary of the Bouleau River, flowing in the unorganized territory of Rivière-Nipissis, in the regional county municipality of Sept-Rivières, in the administrative region of Côte-Nord, in the province of Quebec (Canada).

== Geography ==
The course of the Petite rivière au Bouleau descends towards the south-east, between the Matamec River (located on the west side) and the rivers Chiskal and Bouleau (located on the east side).

The Petite rivière au Bouleau takes its source from an unidentified lake (length: 0.9 km (0.56 mi); altitude: 639 m (2,096 ft)), in the unorganized territory of Rivière-Nipissis. The mouth of the head lake is located south of the lake, either at:

- 128 km (80 mi) south of the boundary between Labrador and Quebec;
- 9.2 km (5.7 mi) southeast of a bay in Nipisso Lake;
- 25.6 km (15.9 mi) north-west of the mouth of the Petite rivière au Bouleau;
- 67.0 km (41.6 mi) northeast of downtown Sept-Îles.

From the head lake, the course of the Petite rivière au Bouleau descends on 39.7 km (24.7 mi), with a drop of 454 m (1,490 ft), according to the following segments:

Upper course of the Petite rivière au Bouleau (segment of 13.4 km (8.3 mi))

- 3.6 km (2.2 mi) to the southeast, crossing three small lakes; then crossing on 0.7 km (0.43 mi) towards the south a lake (altitude: 608 m (1,995 ft)), until its mouth;
- 6.4 km (4.0 mi) south-east, crossing three small lakes and forming a hook north, to the north-west shore of Lac de la Cache;
- 3.4 km (2.1 mi) towards the south-east, crossing Lac de la Cache (length: 4.0 km (2.5 mi); altitude: 521 m (1,709 ft)), up to at its mouth;

Intermediate course of the Petite rivière au Bouleau (segment of 11.1 km (6.9 mi))

- 2.1 km (1.3 mi) towards the south almost in a straight line, up to a bend in the river, corresponding to the discharge (coming from the west) of a set of lakes;
- 2.8 km (1.7 mi) eastward in a valley less and less deep, to the west shore of Lake Travers;
- 6.2 km (3.9 mi) eastward crossing Lac Travers (length: 6.0 km (3.7 mi); altitude: 440 m (1,440 ft)), collecting the discharge (coming from northeast) from Lac à Charles, to the outlet (coming from the northwest) of a set of lakes;

Lower course of the Petite rivière au Bouleau (segment of 15.2 km (9.4 mi))

- 4.1 km (2.5 mi) first to the east relatively in a straight line, forming a hook to the north, crossing three series of rapids, the last of which stretches 1.5 km (0.93 mi), up to a bend in the river;
- 11.1 km (6.9 mi) towards the south in an increasingly deep valley, relatively in a straight line on the first half of the segment, and crossing rapids continuously on the first 3.6 km (2.2 mi); then forming a curve towards the east, then a loop towards the south-east and another towards the west, and turning towards the south-east at the end of the segment, until its mouth.

The Petite rivière au Bouleau flows onto the west bank of the Bouleau River. This confluence is located at:

- 141 km (88 mi) south-west of the center of the village of Havre-Saint-Pierre;
- 59.5 km (37.0 mi) west of the center of the village of Rivière-au-Tonnerre;
- 65.1 km (40.5 mi) northeast of downtown Sept-Îles.

From the confluence of the Petite rivière au Bouleau, the current descends the course of the rivière au Bouleau over 24.6 km (15.3 mi) towards the south, to the north shore of the estuary of Saint Lawrence.

== Toponymy ==
The Birch (French: Bouleau) is a species of tree belonging to the family Betulaceae and the genus Betula. Birch usually grows in poor and often siliceous areas. This tree produces white bark and has small leaves. Generally, its wood is used in cabinet making, carpentry and in the manufacture of pulp. The river was also known as the rivière du Lac Travers.

The toponym "Petite rivière au Bouleau" was made official on December 5, 1968.

== See also ==
- List of rivers of Quebec
