= Lake Nipisso =

Lake in Rivière-Nipissis, Quebec, Canada

- Lac Nipisso (French)
- Location within Quebec
- Location: Rivière-Nipissis, Sept-Rivières, Quebec
- Coordinates: 50.8567°N 65.8242°W
- Primary outflows: Nipisso River
- Basin countries: Canada
- Max. length: 25 kilometres (16 mi)
- Max. width: 4 kilometres (2.5 mi)
- Surface area: 40 square kilometres (15 sq mi)
- Surface elevation: 348 metres (1,142 ft)

Lake Nipisso (French: Lac Nipisso) is a 40 square kilometres (15 sq mi) lake in a remote part of the Côte-Nord region of Quebec, Canada.

== Location ==
Lake Nipisso is in the unorganized territory of Rivière-Nipissis in the Sept-Rivières Regional County Municipality, Côte-Nord. It is about 75 kilometres (47 mi) north of northeast of Sept-Îles and is in the Duplessis (Côte-Nord) tourist region. The lake is 25 kilometres (16 mi) long, up to 4 kilometres (2.5 mi) wide, and covers an area of 40 square kilometres (15 sq mi).

The lake is a widening of the Nipisso River, which flows into its north end from Lac Premio-Réal and Lac de Mouches in the northeast, and continues from its south end in a southeast direction to the Nipissis River, of which it is a tributary. The Nipisso river drains an area of 4,196 square kilometres (1,620 sq mi).

The Quebec North Shore and Labrador Railway is 10 kilometres (6.2 mi) to the west, and a main power transmission line from the Churchill Falls Generating Station runs about 8 kilometres (5.0 mi) to the west. There is no road access to the lake, which can only be reached by float plane or helicopter.

== Environment ==
The region is in the boreal climate zone. Under Quebec's classification of ecological regions, the lake is in ecological sub-region 6j-S: High hills of Nipissis and Magpie lakes, within the bio-climatic sub-domain 6 East: Eastern Moss Spruce. The average annual temperature in the region is −3 °C (27 °F). The warmest month is July, when the average temperature is 13 °C (55 °F), and the coldest is January, with −20 °C (−4 °F).

== Topography ==
Nipisso River basin

The region is near the southern border of the Canadian Shield, and is a rolling to rugged upland, with mountains reaching 2,100 feet (640 m). The Nipissis and Nipisso run through deep valleys in this upland. Lake Nipisso is in what was once a deeper valley parallel to the Nipissis-Wacouno valley. The valley was filled by glaciers with boulders and pebbles in a matrix of silt and sand. Subsequently these deposits were reworked by the present river.

In the south of the Nipisso Lake area there are signs of intense glacial erosion, but there are few glacial deposits. North of 50°50' there are greater quantities of glacial debris, with large amounts of sand and gravel in the valleys, and many sand plains. Just east of the north end of Lake Nipisso there are three crescent-shaped ridges of sand and gravel about 1,000 feet (300 m) long, 40 feet (12 m) wide and 20 feet (6.1 m) high. These are at right angles to the direction of the Laurentide Ice Sheet movement, and may be recessional moraines.

== Geology ==
Lake Nipisso and Lake Manitou to the east define the Manitou-Nipisso geological area, which is part of the Polycyclic Belt of the Grenville Province. The bedrock of the lake is in the Manitou Gneiss Complex, and is mostly composed of quartz–feldspar gneiss and hornblende–biotite gneiss. A 1997 study of a mineral property about 2/3 of the way up the east shore found most of the units present in the Nipisso-Manitou geological complex, including felsic gneisses, abundant gabbro and minor granitoid intrusives. The property had mineralized ultramafic dikes associated with a brecciated felsic pipe.

== Tributary lakes ==
Lakes that drain into Lake Nipisso include:

Lake	Coordinates	Map
Lac Zara	51.1147°N 65.7131°W	EINQG
Lac Premio-Réal	51.0953°N 65.6931°W	EHTBK
Lac des Mouches	51.0661°N 65.6414°W	EHILG
Lac Dimph	51.0361°N 65.6836°W	EGDSK
Lac Vatchichilet	51.0114°N 65.7244°W	EIKMD
Lac Albany	50.9667°N 65.7522°W	EFHEQ
Lac Firth	50.9378°N 65.8767°W	EGJAJ

== Toponymy ==
The name is Montagnais in origin. Former names include Lac Moisi, Lac Moisic and Lac Moisie.

== Sources ==
- Banas, Marc P. (1999), Ressources Dianor Inc. Nipisso Property Final Report of Field Results: Reconnaissance Prospecting Program 26/06/97-05/07/97 (PDF), MRN-géoinformation
- Hogan, Howard. R. (1953), The geology of the Nipissis River and Nipisso Lake map-areas., McGill University
- Lac Nipisso, Commission de toponymie du Québec
- Lac Nipisso, Natural Resources Canada
- Moisie river aquatic reserve, Conservation plan, Government of Quebec, February 2003
- MRC de Sept-Rivières (PDF) (map) (in French), Gouvernement du Québec, 23 August 2006
- Nabil, Hassan; Clark, Thomas; Barnes, Sarah-Jane (1 January 2004), "A Ni-Cu-Co-PGE massive sulfide prospect in a gabbronorite dike at Lac Volant, eastern Grenville Province, Quebec", in Tollo, Richard P. (ed.), Proterozoic Tectonic Evolution of the Grenville Orogen in North America, Geological Society of America, ISBN 978-0-8137-1197-3
- NASA Earth Observations Data Set Index, NASA, archived from the original on 2015-03-06
- "Nipisso (lac)", Mémoire du Québec (in French)
- Peel, M. C.; Finlayson, B. L.; McMahon, T. A. (2007). "Updated world map of the Köppen-Geiger climate classification" (PDF). Hydrology and Earth System Sciences. 11 (5): 1633–1644. Bibcode:2007HESS...11.1633P. doi:10.5194/hess-11-1633-2007. Archived (PDF) from the original on 2019-12-02.
- Saucier, J.-P.; Robitaille, A.; Grondin, P.; Bergeron, J.-F.; Gosselin, J. (2011), Les régions écologiques du Québec méridional (PDF) (map), 4 (in French), Ministère des Ressources naturelles et de la Faune, archived from the original (PDF) on 2020-06-19
