= Matamec River =

Matamec River Rivière Matamec
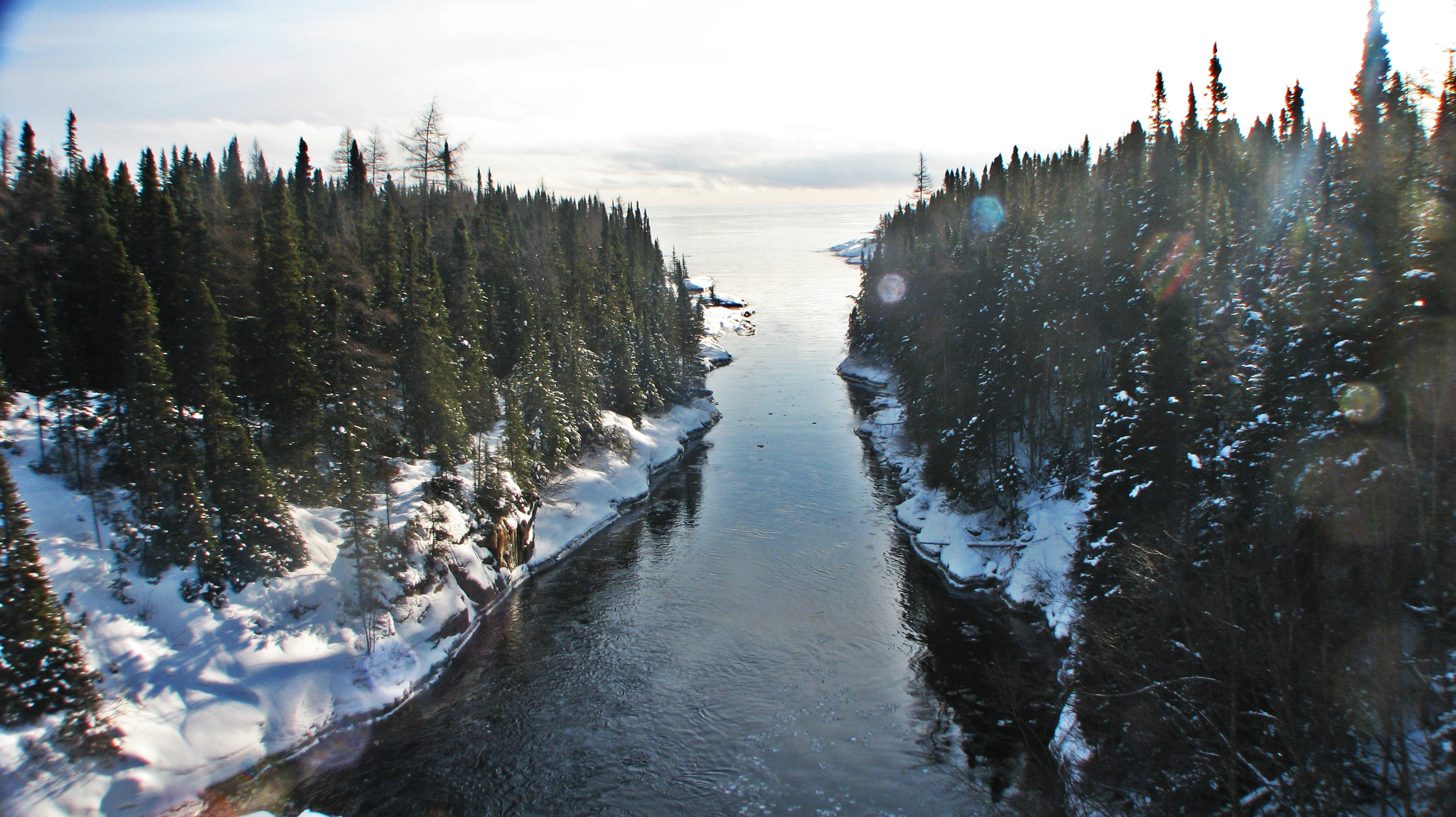
- The river looking south from Quebec Route 138 in December 2011

- Location within Quebec

Location
- Country: Canada
- Province: Quebec
- Region: Côte-Nord
- RCM: Sept-Rivières

Physical characteristics
- Mouth: Gulf of Saint Lawrence
  - coordinates: 50.2836111°N 65.9666667°W
  - elevation: 0 metres (0 ft)
- Length: 66.5 kilometres (41.3 mi)
- Basin size: 679 square kilometres (262 sq mi)

The Matamec River (French: Rivière Matamec) is a salmon river in the Côte-Nord region of Quebec, Canada. It empties into the Gulf of Saint Lawrence. The river was used for research into Atlantic salmon and brook trout by the Woods Hole Oceanographic Institution (WHOI) between 1966 and 1984. Today the southern part of the watershed is strictly protected by the Matamec Ecological Reserve.

== Location ==
The Matamec River is 66.5 kilometres (41.3 mi) long. It rises near Lake Cacaoni and flows from north to south. It passes through Lake Matamec less than 10 kilometres (6.2 mi) from its mouth. The river is rich in fish. The mouth of the river is in the municipality of Sept-Îles in the Sept-Rivières Regional County Municipality. The river enters Moisie Bay to the northeast of the community of Matamec.

== Name ==
The river takes its name from the Innu language matamek, meaning "trout". In an 1865 map of the canton of Moisie the Matamek River or Trout River is shown as the eastern boundary. The Geography Commission made the name Matamek River official in 1916. The form "Matamec River" was adopted in the early 1960s.

== Basin ==
The river basin cover 679 square kilometres (262 sq mi). It lies between the basins of the Moisie River to the west and the Loups Marins River to the east. The basin is partly in the unorganized territory of Rivière-Nipissis and partly in the municipality of Sept-Îles.

The basin is on Precambrian shield. The bedrock is close to the surface in the interior, but is overlain by marine deposits in the coastal plain. The bedrock is in the Grenville Province. Metamorphic rock is gneiss, granitic gneiss and paragneiss Igneous rock is anorthosite, gabronite and granite. During the last ice age the area was covered in ice until around 9,000 years age, which left deposits of glacial till of varying depths throughout the region. When the icecap retreated the south of the basin was covered by the Goldthwait Sea to a maximum depth of 130 metres (430 ft). The sea retreated as the land rebounded from the weight of the ice, leaving deposits of sea clay in the lowlands, often now covered with ombrotrophic peat bogs.

The Matamec watershed contains 31 lakes, ponds and bogs. Rivers and lakes are oriented along fracture zones, faults and breaks in the bedrock, and are usually surrounded by steep, rocky hillsides. Major tributaries of the Matamec river are the Tchinicanam and Rats-Musqués rivers. There are five waterfalls along the 10 kilometres (6.2 mi) stretch of the river from Matamec Lake and the Gulf. Lakes include Lake Matamec and Lake La Croix. Lake Matamec is 105 metres (344 ft) deep.

Average annual temperature is from −1.5 to −1.9 °C (29.3 to 28.6 °F). A map of the ecological regions of Quebec shows the river in sub-regions 6j-T and 6m-T of the east spruce/moss subdomain. Vegetation includes boreal forest with virgin stands of black spruce (Picea mariana) and balsam fir (Abies balsamea).

== Human activities ==
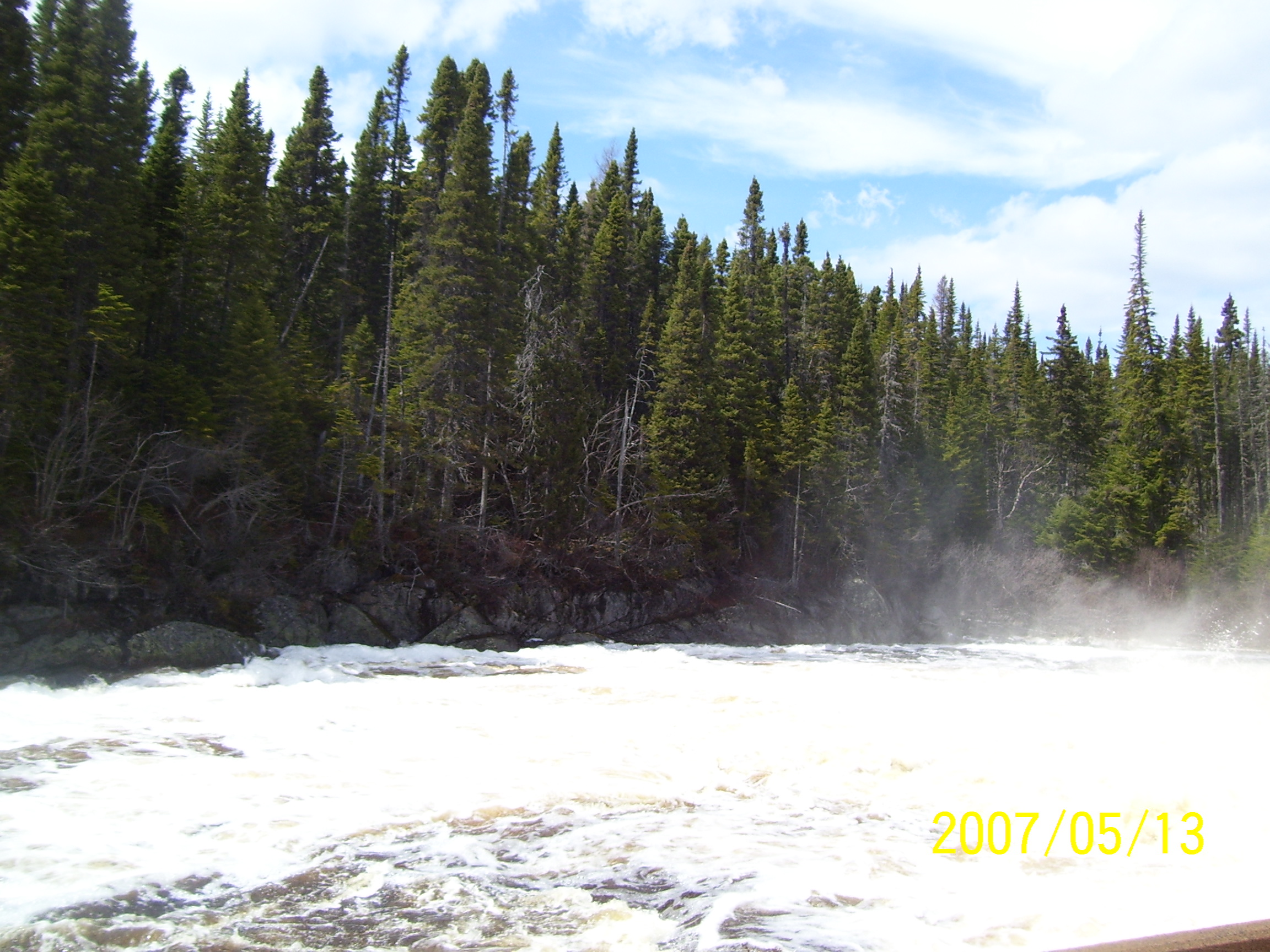
Rapids on the lower river

Walter Amory his son Copley Amory bought a property at the mouth of the river in 1912. Copley Amory, an American, founded a boat building company where the hamlet of Matamec is today, and some families settled around the factory. There was a post office there from 1917 to 1941. Walter was a naturalist, and was interested in changes in the fish and game population, which sometimes caused great hardship to the local Innu. In 1931 Amory invited leading ecologists and geographers to the Matamek Conference on Biological Cycles. Charles Sutherland Elton, a prominent ecologist, was among the contributors, and Amory provided funding for Elton that was used to found the University of Oxford's Bureau of Animal Population.

In the mid-1930s Amory was forced to give up the Matamek operation due to business difficulties. Eventually the property was sold, and became a fishing camp for anglers, with a lodge and cabins scattered through timberland on the property. W. Gallienne was the first owner after Amory, and later sold it to J. Seward Johnson. In 1966 Johnson gave about 150 acres (61 ha) of land at the mouth of the river to the Woods Hole Oceanographic Institution (WHOI).

== Conservation ==
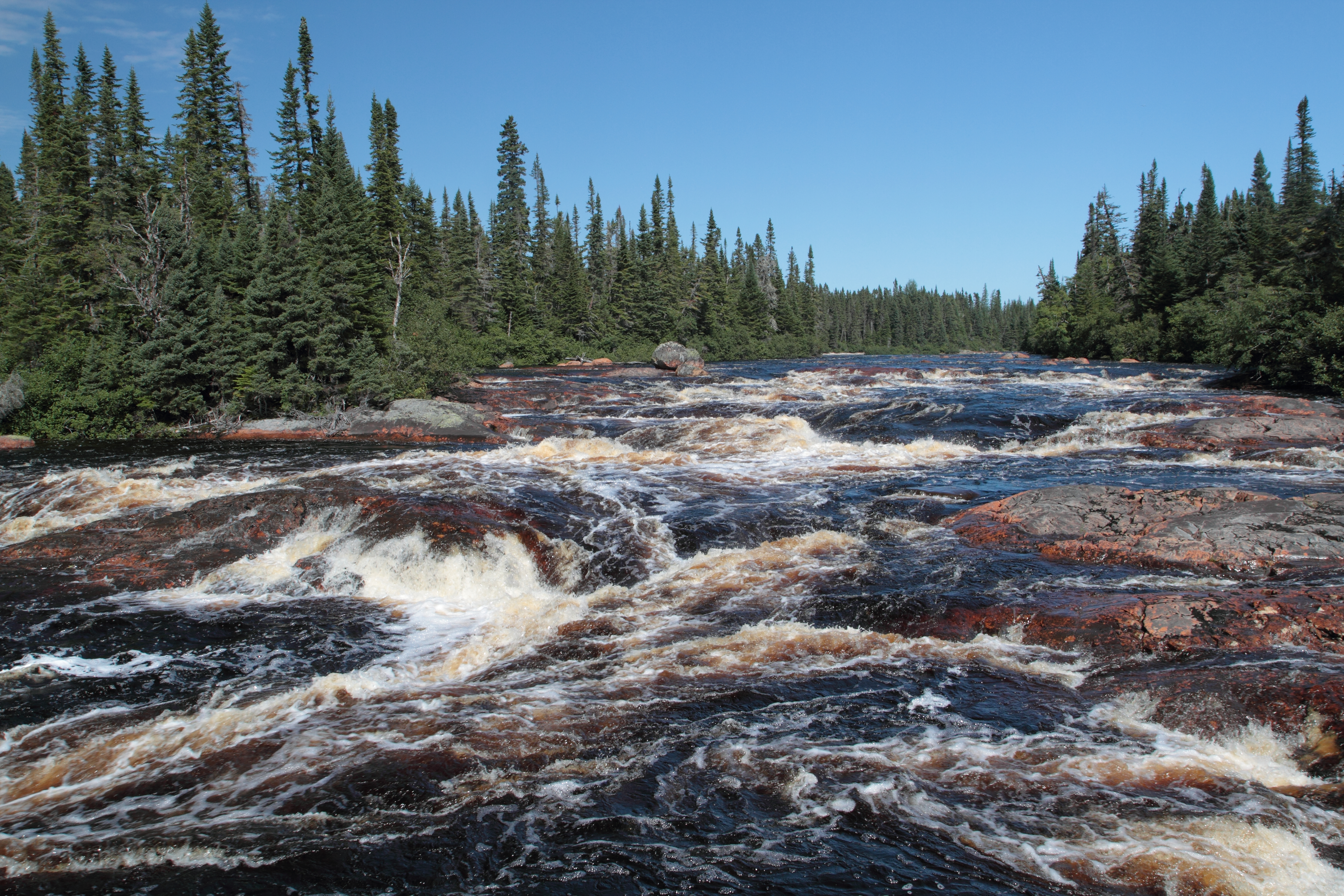
The river looking north from Quebec Route 138 in August 2012

The WHOI acquired the site at the river mouth in 1966 for Salmonid experiments. Also in 1966, the Quebec government created the Matamek River Reserve, which limited public access and increased protection of Atlantic salmon and brook trout. In 1970 the whole of the Matamec river basin was given reserve status, under which hunting and fishing were allowed only for research purposes and on lands where the Innu people held trapping rights. At first the WHOI studied salmon in the lower river and the Matamec Lake, then expanded to include brook trout in other parts of the watershed, and salmon in the nearby Moisie and Corneille rivers. Research also included limnology, sedimentology, hydrology and physical geography. During the research period the ministry built a salmon-pass on the Matamec River.

Woods Hole closed their facility at the end of 1984. WHOI withdrew in part because of funding issues but also to focus on its primary mission of oceanography, and made every effort to find a Canadian organization that could take over the station and continue the research, but without success. The act had not explicitly prohibited logging, but had said the Ministry must consider the impact on the research program and salmon stocks before giving permission. When the research operation closed, the basin could therefore be opened up to logging.

In 1975 the Woods Hole Oceanographic Institute and INRS-eau made a joint proposal to create an ecological reserve. The southern part of the watershed became an ecological reserve 25 years later. The reserve, which is mostly covered by pristine forest or wetlands, covers 184.86 square kilometres (71.37 sq mi). This is slightly more than a quarter of the watershed. As of 2015 the river basin included an ecological reserve, the Matamec Ecological Reserve (Réserve écologique de la Matamec), with strict IUCN category Ia protection. There is another proposed category 1a ecological reserve covering the north part of the river, and a proposed category VI reserve allowing sustainable use of the environment. The two category Ia reserves cover 546 square kilometres (211 sq mi), and the proposed category VI reserve covers about 120 square kilometres (46 sq mi).

== Sources ==
- Carpentier, Réal (2011), Réserve écologique de la Matamec Conservation Plan (PDF), Government of Québec, ministère du Développement durable, de l'Environnement et des Parcs
- Deslisle, André (Fall 1987), "Matamek: Toward an Uncertain Future", Oceanus, 30 (3), Woods Hole Oceanographic Institution
- Portrait préliminaire de la zone de gestion intégrée de l'eau par bassin versant Duplessis (PDF) (in French), OBV Duplessis, April 2015, archived from the original (PDF) on 2019-09-02
- Rivière Matamec (in French), Commission de toponymie du Québec
- Rivière Matamec (in French), Ressources naturelles Canada
- Saucier, J.-P.; Robitaille, A.; Grondin, P.; Bergeron, J.-F.; Gosselin, J. (2011), Les régions écologiques du Québec méridional (PDF) (map), 4 (in French), Ministère des Ressources naturelles et de la Faune, archived from the original (PDF) on 2020-06-19
