= Caribous-de-Val-d'Or Biodiversity Reserve =

Biodiversity reserve in Quebec, Canada

- IUCN category III (natural monument or feature)
- Location within Quebec Location within Canada
- Nearest city: Val d'Or
- Coordinates: 47°58′00″N 77°41′00″W
- Area: 434.19 km^{2} (167.64 sq mi)
- Established: April 28, 2009

Caribous-de-Val-d'Or Biodiversity Reserve (French: Réserve de biodiversité des Caribous-de-Val-d'Or) is a biodiversity reserve located in Abitibi-Témiscamingue, Quebec, Canada, less than 20 km (12 mi) southeast of the city of Val d'Or. It was established on April 28, 2009. The largest lake in the reserve is Sabourin Lake. With an area of 434.19 km^{2} (167.64 sq mi), it is one of the largest protected areas in Quebec.

== Geography ==
Caribous-de-Val-d'Or Biodiversity Reserve is located in Abitibi-Témiscamingue between latitudes 47°45'N and 48°02'N and between longitudes 77°22'W and 77°52'W less than 20 km (12 mi) southeast of Val d'Or. It can be accessed via a major forest road (Chemin Twin) and other forest roads from the north and east via Quebec Route 117. The southwest is bordered by the Caribous-de-Jourdan Ecological Reserve and part of the southeast is bordered by the Ottawa River.

== Purpose ==
The purpose of the reserve is to protect the caribou (there are currently around 30 within the reserve), which was once abundant in southern Quebec. The population of caribou within the reserve is one of the most threatened in Quebec, due to a variety of factors, such as its size, fragmentation, isolation and predation by the wolf. Although the reserve itself has an area of 434.19 km^{2} (167.64 sq mi), the habitat used by the caribou extends to between 1,200 km^{2} (460 sq mi) and 2,000 km^{2} (770 sq mi).

== Flora and fauna ==
Other wildlife within the reserve include black lichen peatlands and spruce forests, which are essential. There are also 51 species of bird, with 43 of them nesting in the reserve; there are also cranes and sharp-tailed grouse.

There is a huge diversity of mammals, including the black bear, North American porcupine, wolf, lynx, raccoon, coyote, moose and caribou. Within Sabourin Lake, there are twelve species of fish.

== Protective measures ==
There have been protective measures within the reserve to preserve the caribou population, such as the hunting and trapping of their main predators such as black bears and wolves. The number of moose is also being reduced.
