= Biodiversity reserves of Quebec =

A biodiversity reserve of Quebec is a protected area established to promote maintenance of biodiversity in the terrestrial environment and more specifically to maintain representatives of the various natural regions of Quebec, Canada. There are five biodiversity reserves in Quebec with permanent protection status.

== Definition ==
The main difference from national parks is that there is no systematic development or establishment of service infrastructure or recreational or educational activities organized by the government. In addition, hunting and trapping activities, occupations such as vacationing and recreational activities such as hiking, biking, snowmobiling or motor boating are permitted. These are protected areas where, in general, only industrial activities exploiting natural resources are prohibited, while access and traffic are free.

Biodiversity reserves are managed by the Quebec Ministry of Sustainable Development, Environment, Wildlife and Parks.

Biodiversity reserve, along with aquatic reserve, is a status set up to provide Québec with a network of protected areas that must include representative samples of all types of ecosystems. This level of representation is determined by the Quebec Reference Ecological Framework, which ensures an adequate spatial distribution of protected areas in Quebec.

== List of Quebec biodiversity reserves ==
Biodiversity reserve	Image	Area		Created	Regional county municipality
Biodiversity reserve	Image	km²	sq mi	Created	Regional county municipality
Caribous-de-Val-d’Or		434.19	167.64	2009	La Vallée-de-l'Or
Kakinwawigak		243.1	93.9	2019	Témiscamingue
Karst-de-Saint-Elzéar		44.27	17.09	2009	Bonaventure
Katnukamat		532.91	205.76	2019	Minganie
Lakes Vaudray and Joannès		193.07	74.54	2007	Rouyn-Noranda
Météorite		232.72	89.85	2009	Manicouagan, Caniapiscau
Taitaipenistouc Meanders		326.53	126.07	2019	Sept-Rivières
Harricana Moraine		365	141	2019	La Vallée-de-l'Or, Rouyn-Noranda
Opasatica		334.4	129.1	2019	Rouyn-Noranda, Témiscamingue
Uapishka		1,381.91	533.56	2009	Manicouagan, Caniapiscau, Sept-Rivières
Vallée-de-la-Rivière-Sainte-Marguerite Biodiversity Reserve		321	124,093234	2005	Saguenay–Lac-Saint-Jean and Côte-Nord

== Proposed biodiversity reserves ==
The ministry has set aside several territories for the creation of future biodiversity reserves. In general, this proposed status is valid for a period of 4 years. Some of the proposed biodiversity reserves protect areas that are under study with a view to creating national parks:

- Albanel-Témiscamie-Otish (proposed park)
- Anneaux-Forestiers
- Baie-de-Boatswain
- Basses-Collines-du-Lac-au-Sorcier
- Basses-Collines-du-Lac-Coucou
- Basses-Collines-du-Lac-Guernesé
- Basses-Collines-du-Ruisseau-Serpent
- Brûlis-du-Lac-Frégate
- Brûlis-du-Lac-Oskélanéo
- Buttes-du-Lac-Montjoie
- Canyon-de-la-Rivière-aux-Rats
- Collines-de-Brador
- Collines-de-Muskuchii
- Côte-d’Harrington Harbour (projet de parc)
- Domaine-La-Vérendrye
- Dunes-de-la-Rivière-Attic
- Esker-Mistaouac
- Estuaire-des-Rivières-Koktac-et-Nauberakvik
- Fjord-Tursukattaq
- Forêt-Montmorency
- Grandes-Piles
- Hirondelle
- Îles-de-l’Est-du-Pipmuacan
- Îles-du-Kiamika
- Kangiqsujuaq
- Lac-Berté
- Lac-Dana
- Lac-Gensart
- Lac-Ménistouc
- Lac-Némiscachingue
- Lac-Onistagane
- Lac-Pasteur
- Lac-Plétipi
- Lac-Saint-Cyr
- Lac-Sérigny
- Lac-Taibi
- Lac-Wetetnagami
- Marais-du-Lac-Parent
- Massif-des-Lacs-Belmont-et-Magpie
- Montagne-Blanches
- Montagne-du-Diable
- Mont-O’Brien
- Mont-Sainte-Marie
- Monts Groulx
- Opémican
- Paakumshumwaau-Maatuskaau
- Paul-Provencher
- Péninsule-de-Ministikawatin
- Plaine-de-la-Missisicabi
- Plateau-de-la-Pierriche
- Quaqtaq-Kangirsuk
- Réservoir-Decelles
- Rivière-de-la-Racine-de-Bouleau
- Rivière-Delay
- Rivière-Vachon
- Ruisseau-Niquet
- Seigneurie-du-Triton
- Sikitakan Sipi
- Station-de-Biologie-des-Laurentides
- Tourbières-Boisées-du-Chiwakamu
- Vallée-de-la-Rivière-Godbout
- Vallée-de-la-Rivière-Maganasipi
- Vallée-de-la-Rivière-Natashquan (projet de parc)
- Vallée-Tousignant
- Wanaki
- Waskaganish

== Sources ==
- Réserve de biodiversité / Réserve de biodiversité projeté, Ministère du Développement durable, de l'Environnement et des Parcs
