= Karst-de-Saint-Elzéar Biodiversity Reserve =

- IUCN category III (natural monument or feature)
- Location within Quebec Location within Canada
- Nearest city: Saint-Elzéar
- Coordinates: 48°16′00″N 65°21′00″W
- Area: 44.27 km^{2} (17.09 sq mi)
- Established: June 20, 2005

Karst-de-Saint-Elzéar Biodiversity Reserve (French: Réserve de biodiversité du Karst-de-Saint-Elzéar) is a biodiversity reserve located in Gaspésie–Îles-de-la-Madeleine, Quebec, Canada, around 15 km (9.3 mi) north of the town of Saint-Elzéar. It was established on June 20, 2005. It lies between latitudes 48°13’N and 48°19’N and between longitudes 65°17’W and 65°25’W. The elevation of the reserve lies at between 135 m (443 ft) and 605 m (1,985 ft).

Within the reserve, seven caves have been discovered, although only one of them (grotte de Saint-Elzéar) is open to the public. It is the only reserve to conserve a karst.

The cave is always 4 °C (39 °F), whatever the time of year. It is 200 m (660 ft) long and 35 m (115 ft) deep. It is estimated to be around 230,000 years old, making it one of the oldest caves in Quebec.
