= Carheil Lake =

Lake in Quebec, Canada

- Lac Carheil (French)
- Location within Quebec
- Coordinates: 52.6575°N 67.0869444°W
- Primary outflows: Carheil River
- Catchment area: 328 square kilometres (127 sq mi)
- Basin countries: Canada
- Average depth: 33.9 metres (111 ft)
- Max. depth: 76 metres (249 ft)

Carheil Lake (French: Lac Carheil) is a lake in the Côte-Nord region of Quebec, Canada. It is just south of Fermont, and is the source of the Carheil River, which runs south to the Aux Pékans River. The lake has been polluted with phosphorus from wastewater effluent from Fermont, causing algal bloom. This is cause for concern since the lake is among the headwaters for the wild and unspoiled Moisie River.

== Location ==
Carheil Lake is south of Fermont and of Quebec Route 389. It is in the Caniapiscau Regional County Municipality near the western boundary of Labrador. The lake is in the Grenville Province in the southeast of the Canadian Shield plateau, composed of Precambrian rocks, on average 300 metres (980 ft) above sea level. Carheil Lake's elongated shape and orientation indicate a glacial origin. The lake has a maximum depth of 76 metres (249 ft) in its center and average depth of 33.9 metres (111 ft).

== Name ==
The lake's name was made official on 5 December 1968. The Commission de toponymie du Québec does not have information about its origin. The commission states that the canton of Carheil, far to the west, is named after the Jesuit missionary Étienne de Carheil (1633-1726). Possibly there is a connection.

== Drainage basin ==
Carheil Lake is at the head of the Moisie River drainage basin, and drains an area of 328 square kilometres (127 sq mi). It is in an area of rounded hills and flat areas with peat bogs, wetlands and many lakes and small streams. The valleys show the influence of glacial action and contain undifferentiated glacial till and fluvioglacial deposits of sand and gravel.

Lac Daviault is to the north of the lake, lying to the east and south of the town of Fermont, and draining via Lac Sans Nom into Carheil Lake. Lac de la Rue feeds through Lac Cladonie and Lac Low Ball into the northwest of the lake. Lac Jonquet is to the east of the lake. Lac Moiré to the northeast also drains into the lake, as do other small lakes such as Lac Tupper, Lac Perchard and Lac en Croissant. The Carheil River leaves Carheil Lake from the southeast. The river is a tributary of the Aux Pékans River, in turn a tributary of the Moisie River. It is estimated that the outflow from the lake is about 23 cubic metres per second (810 cu ft/s).

== Environment ==
The average annual temperature in the region is −5 °C (23 °F). The warmest month is July, when the average temperature is 12 °C (54 °F), and the coldest is January, with −21 °C (−6 °F). There are scattered areas of permafrost. A measurement of lake temperature in late July 2011 gave 16 °C (61 °F) near the surface, falling to 5 °C (41 °F) at the lowest levels. A map of the Ecological regions of Quebec shows the Carheil Lake rising to the south of Fermont just west of the Spruce/lichen domain of the boreal zone. It is in the eastern spruce/moss domain of the boreal zone.

The Carheil watershed is characterized by coniferous trees that are tolerant of prolonged contact with water. Even in the undergrowth, shrubs and herbaceous species are all tolerant of extreme moisture conditions, such as willow shrubs, heathers, bog-myrtle and grey alder. Black spruce stands replace the fir-white birch found at lower latitudes. Several broad leaved and coniferous tree species coexist with black spruce, such as yellow birch, trembling aspen, balsam poplar, balsam fir and tamarack. The undergrowth is mainly carpets of moss and ericaceous species. As of 2015 the lake's shoreline appeared to be in excellent natural condition.

== Human presence ==
The surroundings of the lake include cottages and forest shelters. An existing road leads south from Fermont to the lake. A report issued in 2016 on improving Quebec Route 389 between Fire Lake and Fermont proposed as one option to leave the present Route 389 between km 507 and 566, branch northeast and cross the Pekans River and La Rue Lake, then run along the existing road along Carheil Lake and up to the present Route 389. Construction of the road would involve deforestation at the crossing of the Pékans River and De La Rue Lake, and along the northwest shore of Carheil Lake. In September 2012 two men drowned in the lake when their canoe overturned. Neither was wearing a life jacket. A new 6 kilometres (3.7 mi) quad (all-terrain vehicle) trail was built in 2015 from Fermont to the lake by the Club VTT du Grand Nord.

In 2017 Metals Australia announced initial exploration results at their 4,450 hectares (11,000 acres) Lac Rainy Est graphite project, important in providing an input to lithium-ion battery manufacturing. The press release noted that a high grade deposit at Carheil Lake, less than 200 metres (660 ft) from the Lac Rainy project area, had yielded samples of 35.49% Cg and 40.67% Cg. The Carheil Lake deposit is on the west shore of the south part of the lake. The graphite was found in a structural lineament that runs roughly north-south for about 2 kilometres (1.2 mi). A report by the same company in May 2019 stated that they had drilled 17 holes along the formation for a length of about 1.25 kilometres (0.78 mi) and confirmed eastern and western extensions of the Carheil Graphitic Zone.

== Pollution ==
The lake is classified a Lake of Concern by Quebec's Ministère de l'Environnement et de la Lutte contre les changements climatiques. In April 2011 it was reported that water management experts in Sept-Îles were concerned about cyanobacteria, or blue-green algae, that had been found in Carheil Lake. The cause of excessive phosphorus in the lake was discharge from the Fermont treatment plant over a period of forty years. The plant had recently been modernized, reducing the phosphorus released by 80% to 90%. The lake is a tributary to the large wild river, the Moisie River. There was a lack of funding for a $150,000 study of the impact on the Moisie River.

The Ministry of Sustainable Development, Environment and Parks (MDDEP) told the OBV Duplessis to evaluate the situation of Carheil Lake, resulting in publication of a study in November 2011. The report noted that Lakes Daviault and Sans-Nom had also been affected with cyanobacterial efflorescence every year since 2005, and the Fermont treatment plant was the only known source of phosphorus. Until 2010 wastewater from Fermont was treated only by removal of solids. In 2010 a treatment system was installed with the purpose of removing phosphorus from the effluent, which in theory would reduce the phosphorus concentration from 2.5 to 0.8 milligrams per litre (9.0×10^{−8} to 2.9×10^{−8} lb/cu in). Although less phosphorus is being added to the lakes, phosphorus tends to accumulate rather than flow away, so the lakes could continue to experience cyanobacterial efflorescence from existing phosphorus.

The researchers found that little was known about flow rates, renewal times, levels of oxygen, phosphorus and nitrogen, stratification, phytoplankton and fish populations in Carheil Lake or the other lakes. Almost the only information available was on the water quality in 1996 at the mouth of the Moisie River, 350 kilometres (220 mi) downstream. To fill the gap, OBV Duplessis was conducting an ecosystem study of the three lakes. The 2011 report covered hydrodynamic and physicochemical aspects, and a second report on biological aspects was planned for 2012 subject to funding availability. Phosphorus concentration was 7.1 micrograms per litre (0.00050 gr/imp gal) in July and 4.9 micrograms per litre (0.00034 gr/imp gal) in October. By comparison, Lake Perchard, to the north of Fermont, supplies the town with drinking water. It had a phosphorus concentration in October of 3.3 micrograms per litre (0.00023 gr/imp gal). A more complete report was issued in April 2015 giving information about the biota.

== Sources ==
- Carheil (in French), Commission de toponymie du Québec
- Lac Carheil (in French), Commission de toponymie du Québec
- Lac Carheil (in French), Ressources naturelles Canada
- Lac Daviault (in French), Ressources naturelles Canada
- La santé du lac Carheil inquiète les spécialistes (in French), Radio-Canada, 29 April 2011
- Liste des lacs répertoriés (PDF) (in French), Ministère de l'Environnement et de la Lutte contre les changements climatiques
- Luce, Myriam; Ibrahim, Ghassen; Bourdon, Philippe (November 2011), Cyanobactéries aux lacs Davioult, Sans Nom et Carheil (PDF) (Étude partielle) (in French), OBV Duplessis
- Maiden Diamond Drilling Program Completed at the Lac Rainy Graphite Project (PDF) (Press release), ASX, 17 May 2019
- NASA Earth Observations Data Set Index, NASA, archived from the original on 2015-03-06
- Paradis, Steeve (6 June 2012), "Corps retrouvé au lac Carheil", Le Soleil (in French)
- Portrait diagnostique de la problématique des cyanobactéries - bassin versant du lac Carheil (PDF) (in French), OBV Duplessis, April 2015
- Rivière Carheil (in French), Ressources naturelles Canada
- Route 389 Improvement Program Between Fire Lake and Fermont (Kilometre 478 To 564) (PDF), Transports Quebec, January 2016
- Saucier, J.-P.; Robitaille, A.; Grondin, P.; Bergeron, J.-F.; Gosselin, J. (2011), Les régions écologiques du Québec méridional (PDF) (map), 4 (in French), Ministère des Ressources naturelles et de la Faune, archived from the original (PDF) on 2020-06-19
- Up to 53.7% Cg Graphite in Samples at the Lac Rainy Graphite Project (PDF) (Press release), ASX, 8 September 2017

== External sources ==
- N'Binkéna Nantob-Bikatui (2011), Localisation du lac Carheil dans le bassin versant de la rivière Moisie (PDF) (Map showing the river and reserve) (in French), OBV Duplessis, archived from the original (PDF) on 2019-09-21
