= Gabronite =

Gabronite or Gabbronite is a former name for a mineral found in Norway, no longer widely used. It describes a form of scapolite or nepheline.

== Current views ==
Mindat.org defines the term "Gabbronite" as:

Old discredited name, has been referred to as both Scapolite and Nepheline. [Clark, 1993, 249 - "Hey's Mineral Index - 3rd Edition"]

Wiktionary defines "Gabbronite" as "A compact variety of scapolite, resembling gabbro."

The term is sometimes used in modern geological descriptions. Thus a description of the Matamec Ecological Reserve in Quebec, Canada says, "Elsewhere, igneous rock is composed of anorthosite, gabronite and granite."

A web search is likely to show a polished mostly-black stone used in jewelry.

== Descriptions ==
William Phillips (1773–1828) lists the mineral under SILEX, and describes it as follows:

GABRONITE. The Gabronite occurs massive, and is of a bluish or greenish grey colour; its fracture is lamellar, it is translucent on the edges, and hard enough to scratch glass, though not to give fire with the steel. Its specific gravity is nearly 3; and it is composed of 54 per cent of silex, 24 of alumine, 1.5 of magnesia, 17.25 of potash and soda, 1.25 of the oxides of iron and manganese, and 2 of water. The Gabronite has only been found in Norway. The bluish variety, near Arendahl, with hornblend; the greenish, at Fredericksvarn [Stavern], disseminated in a large grained sienite.

According to Parker Cleaveland (1780–1858) the mineral is probably a variety of Fettstein. Cleaveland defines it as follows:

GABRONITE. HAUT. BRONGNIART. It occurs in masses, whose structure is more of less distinctly foliated, or sometimes compact. Its lustre is glistening, and somewhat resinous; and its fracture is uneven or splintery. It scratches glass, but scarcely gives sparks with steel. It is more or less translucent at the edges; and its colors are gray, bluish or greenish gray, and sometimes red.

Before the blowpipe it melts with some difficulty into an opaque white globule. It contains, according to John, silex 54.0, alumine 24.0, potash and soda 17.25, magnesia 1.5, oxides of iron and manganese 1.25, water 2.0.

This mineral is by some referred to the Scapolite; but, if the preceding analysis is correct, the union is inadmissible.

The Gabronite is found in Norway near Arendal; also at Friedrichswärn, where it occurs in sienite.

Webster's 1828 English Dictionary gives:

GA'BRONITE, n. A mineral, supposed to be a variety of fettstein. It occurs in masses, whose structure is more or less foliated, or sometimes compact. Its colors are gray, bluish or greenish gray, and sometimes red.

Armand Dufrénoy (1792–1857) describes the mineral as:

Gabronite. – This mineral, found only in Arendal in Norway, is found in an amorphous mass, with a compact or hard lamellar texture... The École des Mines possesses a sample in which I have been able to recognize not only that the angles are straight, but that there is a diagonal cleavage at an angle of about 135°; from which it follows that the prism is square, as in wernérite [common scapolite]: the shine of gabronite is fat and oily. Its color is dirty gray, greenish gray; it barely scratches glass: its specific gravity is 2.74. The composition of gabronite, which I will give in a few lines, departs from that of wernérite by the great quantity of soda it contains. This circumstance induced M. Beudant to associate it with nepheline; but the six-sided prism form of this latter species is opposed to this association.

== See also ==
- Gabbronorite

== Sources ==
- Carpentier, Réal (2011), Réserve écologique de la Matamec Conservation Plan (PDF), Government of Québec, ministère du Développement durable, de l'Environnement et des Parcs
- Cleaveland, Parker (1822), An Elementary Treatise on Mineralogy and Geology, Cummings and Hilliard
- Dufrénoy, Armand (1856), Traité de Minéralogie, Viet. Dalmont
- "Gabbronite", mindat.org
- Gabronite, Webster
- Phillips, William (12 July 2012), An Elementary Introduction to the Knowledge of Mineralogy: Including Some Account of Mineral Elements and Constituents, Cambridge University Press, ISBN 978-1-108-04938-2
