= Aux Pékans River =

- Location within Quebec

Location
- Country: Canada
- Province: Quebec
- RCM: Caniapiscau

Physical characteristics
- Mouth
  - location: Moisie River
  - coordinates: 52.206353°N 66.810650°W
- Basin size: 3,419 square kilometres (1,320 sq mi)

The Aux Pékans River (French: Rivière aux Pékans) is a river in the Côte-Nord region of Quebec, Canada. It is a tributary of the Moisie River. Hydro-Québec caused controversy in the early 1990s by proposing to divert the river to supply the reservoir of the SM-3 power plant on the Sainte-Marguerite River.

== Location ==
The Aux Pékans River is in the unorganized territory of Rivière-Mouchalagane in the Caniapiscau Regional County Municipality. The name was made official on 5 December 1968. The Commission de toponymie du Québec has no information on its origins. (Note: Denis Diderot's Encyclopédie Méthodique (1782) says of the name pékan that it has been used confusingly to designate different animals including skunks, cats and fox, but the pékan is just the same as the marten. It has the same body shape, the same proportions, the same tail length, the same hair quality, the same number of teeth and nails, the same instincts and the same natural habits; thus, it is just a variety of marten, or a species so closely related, that it presents no characteristic difference. It is true that it has hair that is browner, lighter & more silky than the marten, but this difference is common with the beaver and other animals of America whose fur is more beautiful than that of the same animals in northern Europe.)

The river rises in Lac de la Bouteille, south of Lake Germaine and west of Fermont. It flows to the west of the Mont Wright mines. Quebec Route 389 crosses the Pékans River south of Fermont. In August 2015 a limit of 10 tonnes was placed on vehicles crossing the bridge. The Ministry of Transport was working on a replacement structure, due to be commissioned in summer 2016.

The river flows in a generally SSE direction, then near its end turns to the NE and enters the Moise River from the right. The Pékans drains an area of 3,419 square kilometres (1,320 sq mi) and is the second most important tributary of the Moise River after the Nipissis, which drains 4,196 square kilometres (1,620 sq mi). The proposed Moisie River Aquatic Reserve would include 115 kilometres (71 mi) of the Aux Pékans River.

== Tributaries ==
Tributaries of the Aux Pékans River include the Grasse River, which enters the right bank from the south, the Carheil River, which enters the left bank from the north and the La Ronde River, which enters the right bank from the south. The Carheil River rises in Carheil Lake at 52.6575°N 67.0869444°W. The lake is south of Fermont and of Quebec Route 389.

== Environment ==
A map of the Ecological regions of Quebec shows the Aux Pékans River rising to the northwest of Fermont just west of the Spruce/lichen domain of the boreal zone. It flows to its juncture with the Moisie through the eastern spruce/moss domain of the boreal zone.

== Diversion proposal ==
At the start of the 1990s Hydro-Québec announced plans to harness the Sainte-Marguerite River with a new SM-3 hydroelectric project, which would produce 846 MW of electricity. The project would involve the diversion of the Carheil and Aux Pekans rivers, two important tributaries of the Mishtashipu, or Moisie. The Innu people of Mani-Utenam at the mouth of the Moisie were concerned about the increase in methylmercury and decrease in the flow of the Moise, and the effect on the 12,000–35,000 salmon that entered the river annually. However, the Innuat of Uashat to the west in Sept-Îles tended to favor the project.

A report published in 1994 discussed the impact of diverting the Aux Pékans and Carheil rivers for the SM-3 plant. As well as changing the hydrological regime, water temperature would be affected, an important factor in the habitat quality for Atlantic salmon. The report found that the Moise River would become slightly warmer, with less change further downstream. An earlier study has also estimated the impact if some of the diverted water was returned to the Moisie further down.

Calculations were made of the effect on the Moisie estuary if one of the embankments on the Carheil and Aux Pekans were to fail. The flood wave would give a maximum discharge of about 24,600 cubic metres per second (870,000 cu ft/s), but because both embankments had low storage capacity, discharge would return to a flow rate of 5,000 cubic metres per second (180,000 cu ft/s) within about five hours. Water would rise by 2 to 5 metres (6 ft 7 in to 16 ft 5 in) in the estuary depending on whether the sand bars at the river mouth were washed away or remained in place when the flood wave arrived.

A commission of the Bureau of Public Hearings on the environment concluded that the diversion was not economically justified and could adversely affect the salmon population in the Moisie. In the end the government decided in favor of protecting the two tributaries. On 6 February 2003 the Quebec Council of Ministers approved two decrees granting full legal protection as aquatic reserves to the watersheds of the Moisie River down to 25 kilometers from Sept-Îles, and the Ashuapmushuan River down to Lac-Saint-Jean. The Moisie reserve included protection for the Carheil and Aux Pékans, which were not to be diverted.

== Sources ==
- Bassin versant de la rivière Moisie (in French), Ministère de l'Environnement et de la Lutte contre les changements climatiques
- Conservation plan, Moisie River Aquatic Reserve, Quebec, February 2003
- Diderot, Denis; d'Alembert, Jean le Rond (1782), Encyclopédie méthodique
- Francoeur, Louis-Gilles (8 February 2003), "Québec protège la Moisie et l'Ashuapmushuan", Le Devoir (in French)
- Lac Carheil (in French), Ressources naturelles Canada
- Lac de la Bouteille (in French), Ressources naturelles Canada
- L'Heureux, Catherine Delisle (2018-06-06), Les voix politiques des femmes innues face à l'exploitation minière, PUQ, ISBN 978-2-7605-4955-5
- Ministère des Transports (4 August 2015), Restriction de charge sur le pont enjambant la rivière aux Pékans au kilomètre 530 de la route 389
- Morin, G; Sochanska, W. (1990), Rivière Moisie - Étude du milieu physique - volume 5 : régimes thermiques de la rivière Moisie avant et après détournement de la rivière aux Pékans (PDF) (in French), Québec: NRS-Eau
- N'Binkéna Nantob-Bikatui (2011), Localisation du lac Carheil dans le bassin versant de la rivière Moisie (PDF) (Map showing the river and reserve) (in French), OBV Duplessis, archived from the original (PDF) on 2019-09-21
- Morin, Guy; Nzakimuena, Tonino-Joseph; Sochanski, Wanda (1994), "Prévision des températures de l'eau en rivières à l'aide d'un modèle conceptuel : le cas de la rivière Moisie", Canadian Journal of Civil Engineering (in French), 21: 63–75, doi:10.1139/l94-006
- "Réserve aquatique de la Moisie", GrandeQuébec (in French)
- Rivière aux Pékans, Commission de toponymie du Québec
- Rivière aux Pékans (in French), Ressources naturelles Canada
- Rivière Carheil (in French), Ressources naturelles Canada
- Rivière La Ronde (in French), Ressources naturelles Canada
- Saucier, J.-P.; Robitaille, A.; Grondin, P.; Bergeron, J.-F.; Gosselin, J. (2011), Les régions écologiques du Québec méridional (PDF) (map), 4 (in French), Ministère des Ressources naturelles et de la Faune, archived from the original (PDF) on 2020-06-19
