= Denis-Perron dam =

- Location within Quebec
- Country: Canada
- Location: Sept-Rivières Regional County Municipality, Québec
- Coordinates: 50°47′25″N 66°47′31″W
- Construction began: 1994
- Opening date: 2002
- Construction cost: CA$ 2.4 billion
- Owner: Hydro-Québec

Dam and spillways
- Height: 171 m (561 ft)
- Length: 378 m (1,240 ft)
- Width (crest): 10 m (33 ft)
- Width (base): 500 m (1,600 ft)
- Dam volume: 6,325,000 m^{3} (8,273,000 yd^{3})

Reservoir
- Creates: Sainte-Marguerite 3 Reservoir
- Total capacity: 12.5 km^{3} (10,100,000 acre⋅ft)
- Active capacity: 3.3 km^{3} (2,700,000 acre⋅ft)
- Catchment area: 9,000 km^{2} (3,500 mi^{2})
- Surface area: 253 km^{2} (63,000 acres)

Sainte-Marguerite 3 Generating Station
- Coordinates: 50°42′52.93″N 66°46′54.94″W
- Commission date: 2003
- Hydraulic head: 330 m (1,080 ft)
- Turbines: 2 x 441 MW Francis-type
- Installed capacity: 882 MW

Denis-Perron dam (French: Barrage Denis-Perron) is a rockfill embankment dam spanning the Sainte-Marguerite River, a tributary of the lower Saint Lawrence River, in eastern Quebec, Canada. Standing 171 metres (561 ft) high and 378 metres (1,240 ft) long, the dam is the primary component of Hydro-Québec's Sainte-Marguerite 3 hydroelectric project. The dam is the second highest in Quebec and the hydraulic head afforded to its power plant is also the largest in the province.

Construction on the dam began in 1994 after seven years of studies and planning. Before construction began on the dam proper, a 19-metre (62 ft) high, 160-metre (520 ft) long cofferdam was raised to divert the river through a tunnel west of the dam site. An average of 500 workers and a maximum of 1,200, most of whom lived in a construction camp that opened in January 1995, were employed at the dam site during construction. After the cutting of some 233 million board feet of lumber from the future reservoir site, the dam began to impound water in 1998 and finally reached capacity in 2001. The dam and reservoir lie in a very remote region, and an 86-kilometre (53 mi) long access road had to be built to facilitate transportation to the construction site. No area residents were displaced as a result of the remote location, but a large portion of the territory of the indigenous Innu people was flooded. In 1994, Hydro-Québec paid the local Innu CA$20.9 million as compensation.

Full project completion was reached in 2002 at a cost of CA$2.4 billion, making it one of the most significant 21st century hydroelectric developments in North America. After the dam was finished, temporary facilities used during construction were dismantled to ease impact on the local environment. The main workers' camp was actually demolished in 2001, a year before the project's final completion. These areas were replanted with some six hundred thousand trees. Hydroelectricity generation began in 2003. As of 2003, the dam was projected to generate about 2.73 TWh of electricity per year, or an average output of just over 310 megawatts (MW).

The dam impounds a 140 km (87 mi) long, 253 km^{2} (63,000-acre) reservoir with a capacity of about 12.5 km^{3} (10,100,000 acre⋅ft). Excess water is released through a set of outlet works at the base of the dam, with a capacity of 1,440 m^{3}/s (51,000 cu ft/s), and an emergency spillway about 1 km (0.62 mi) northwest of the dam. The spillway's three gates have a total capacity of 1,875 m^{3}/s (66,200 cu ft/s), and its outflow rejoins the river about 1 km (0.62 mi) below the base of the dam. Water is fed from the reservoir through an 8.3 km (5.2 mi) long penstock to the Sainte-Marguerite 3 generating plant, which is located underground and can produce up to 882 MW from two turbines.

== See also ==
- List of largest power stations in Canada
- List of tallest dams in the world
