= Matamec Ecological Reserve =

Ecological reserve in Quebec, Canada

Coordinates: 50°22′00″N 65°54′00″W

- IUCN category Ia (strict nature reserve)
- Interactive map of Matamec Ecological Reserve
- Location: Sept-Îles, Sept-Rivières Regional County Municipality, Québec, Canada
- Established: 1995

Matamec Ecological Reserve is an ecological reserve in Sept-Îles, in Sept-Rivières Regional County Municipality, in Quebec, Canada. It was established in 1995 and is located within the new boundaries of the recently amalgamated city of Sept-Îles.
