= Moisie, Quebec =

Moisie
- District and former city
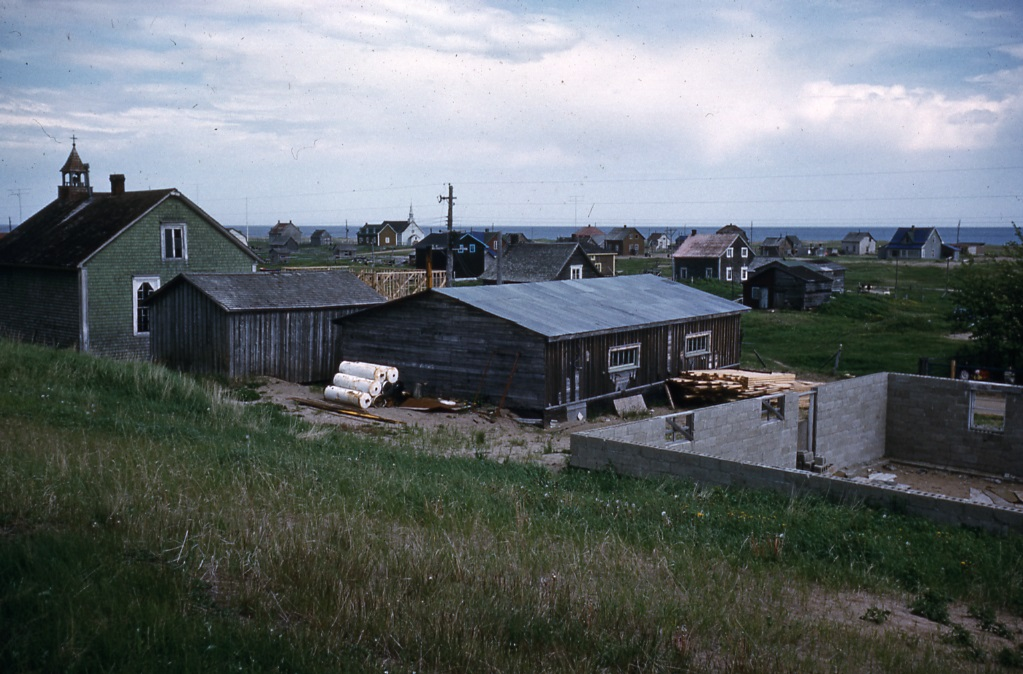

- Seal

- Location within Quebec
- Coordinates: 50°11′29″N 66°5′40″W
- Country: Canada
- Province: Quebec
- Region: Côte-Nord
- RCM: Sept-Rivières
- Municipality: Sept-Îles
- Municipality: January 1, 1955
- City: October 29, 1983
- Amalgamated: February 12, 2003

Area
  - Land: 1,396.99 km^{2} (539.38 sq mi)

Population (2001)
  - Total: 930
  - Density: 0.7/km^{2} (1.8/sq mi)
- Time zone: UTC-5 (EST)
- Postal code: G0G 2B0
- Area codes: 418, 581, and 367
- Geographical code: 24 97005

Moisie (Quebec French pronunciation: [mwazi]) is a district (secteur) of the city of Sept-Îles, Quebec, Canada.

Prior to February 12, 2003, Moisie was an independent city; on that date, it and the Municipality of Gallix were merged into Sept-Îles.

== History ==
Originally Moisie was a small fisherman village located at the mouth of the Moisie River. Its name, taken from this river, has been in use since the 17th century and its meaning and origin are unknown. The village, which was at sea level, was relocated in 1967 after several storm surge floods.

Molson Inc. established a smelter on the other bank of the river in the late 19th century. The company was plowing through three feet of pure iron black sand lying on the beaches as raw material for the forge. Prospectors later explored the region upstream of the river which led to the discovery of large iron ore deposits around Labrador City and Schefferville.

Between 1933 and 1949, the Hudson's Bay Company had a post at Moisie, operating as an outpost of Sept Iles.

On January 1, 1955, the Municipality of Moisie was created out of territory ceded by the Township of Letellier.

The community became home to RCAF Station Moisie in the late 1950s, when the Royal Canadian Air Force established a Pinetree Line early warning radar station nearby. The facility was later renamed CFS Moisie and closed by the early 1990s after defence cutbacks.

On October 29, 1983, the Municipality of Moisie and the Municipality of Rivière-Pigou merged to form the City of Moisie. On February 12, 2003, the City of Moisie was amalgamated into Sept-Îles.

== Demographics ==
Historical census populations – Moisie, Quebec

Year	Pop.	±%
1956	672	—
1961	1,063	+58.2%
1966	1,014	−4.6%
1971	988	−2.6%
1976	1,089	+10.2%

Year	Pop.	±%
1981	1,499	+37.6%
1986	1,118	−25.4%
1991	776	−30.6%
1996	897	+15.6%
2001	930	+3.7%

Population counts are not adjusted for boundary changes or mergers.
Source: Statistics Canada
