= Nipissis River =

- Location within Quebec
- Native name: Rivière Nipissis (French)

Location
- Country: Canada
- Region: Côte-Nord

Physical characteristics
- Source
  - location: Lacs Siamois
  - coordinates: 51.3619°N 65.8583°W
- Mouth
  - location: Moisie River
  - coordinates: 50.493°N 66.0967°W
- Length: 65 kilometres (40 mi)
- Basin size: 4,196 square kilometres (1,620 sq mi)

The Nipissis River (French: Rivière Nipissis, pronounced [ʁivjɛʁ nipisis]) is a river in the Côte-Nord region of Quebec, Canada, a tributary of the Moisie River. It is a recognized salmon river. The river is known for its steep cliffs, which provide a challenging ice-climbing environment.

== Location ==
The Nipissis River is in the unorganized territory of Rivière-Nipissis in the Sept-Rivières Regional County Municipality. Tributaries include the Wacouno and Nipisso rivers, both of which enter from the left. The Nipissis drains a region of 4,196 km^{2} (1,620 sq mi), making it the most important tributary of the Moise River. It is followed by the Aux Pékans River, which drains an area of 3,419 km^{2} (1,320 sq mi). The proposed Moisie River Aquatic Reserve would include the Nipissis River and a narrow strip along its shores.

The Nipissis River is a little over 65 km (40 mi) long. It originates in the Siamois lakes, and empties into the Moisie River about 30 km (19 mi) from its mouth. According to the 1969 Répertoire géographique du Québec the river that runs for a little more than 60 km (37 mi) south to the Siamois lakes is called the Matinipi. The Wacouno River joins the Nipissis to the west of Lake Nipisso. It runs south from the Lake Fournier region. The Nipisso River, from Lake Nipisso, joins the Nipissis about 20 km (12 mi) above its confluence with the Moisie. The McDonald River joins the Nipissis not far from its mouth at the Chute McDonald, or McDonald Falls.

== Name ==
Jean-Baptiste-Louis Franquelin in 1699 followed René Bélanger in calling the river the Petit Saguenay. During the period of Camp-Adams and the Moisie-Salmon-Club (Note: Camp Adams and the Moisie-Salmon-Club were created by Ivers Whitney Adams (1838-1914), a native of Ashburnham, Massachusetts, founder of the American Net and Twine Company and father of professional baseball in Boston. Adams claimed a lease on the Moisie River in 1895, but had to settle various territorial disputes and did not establish a presence on the river until 6 April 1907.) the section of the Mipissis River between the Moisie River and the McDonald Falls was called the Moisie East Branch, and the Moisie upstream of the junction with the Nipisso was called the Moisie West Branch. The river's present name was used by the surveyor Vincent in 1892. Father Lemoine in 1906 wrote that Nipissis was a "lake covered in water lilies", but the Dictionnaire des rivières et lacs de la province de Québec (1914 and 1925) says the Innu name means "small sheet of water" or "small stream".

== Fishing ==
Atlantic salmon can cross the McDonald Falls and potentially swim upstream to the Togas Falls, about 65 km (40 mi) from the mouth of the Nipissis. A fish ladder was added to the McDonald Falls in 1975 to make the passage easier. In February 2019 the council of the Uashat mak Mani-Utenam band formally took possession of the Moisie-Nipissis outfitter at the mouth of the Nipissis, with its sixteen salmon pits. This included 36 km (22 mi) of the Moisie and 4 km (2.5 mi) of the Nipissis. The government of Quebec paid the purchase cost based on an agreement reached with the Innu the previous year. The Innu were considering some changes to the operation.

== Ice climbing ==
In 1994 during a cross-country ski traverse Patrice Beaudet discovered that the Nipissis area had exceptional ice climbing lines. The shores of the river have many cliffs over 200 metres (660 ft) high, with about thirty sites suitable for ice climbing. The mur du 51, as the railwaymen call it, has an extraordinary concentration of cliffs and ice cascades. Beaudet returned repeatedly and climbed lines such as Le Filon (145 m (476 ft), III WI5) and Le Chercheur D'or (160 metres (520 ft), III WI5+).

The area may be reached by train or helicopter from Sept-Îles. Tshiuetin Rail Transportation runs a passenger train between Sept Îles and Schefferville, and will drop off and pick up passengers at their choice of location. Tracks in the region are usually passable from early December until the end of March. The dense boreal forest makes travelling on land difficult, but in the winter the Nipissis River freezes over, and provides a practical route for travelling and camping. The sites on the west bank of the river are hard to access due to deep snow, thick woods and difficult terrain. Although the surface is frozen, the river is tumultuous and the ice may break.

== Railway ==
The Quebec North Shore and Labrador Railway, which runs up the Moisie River valley from the south, follows the Nipissis to the Wacouno, then runs along the Wacouno valley towards Fermont. In August 2019 The Moisie River Protection Association (MRPA) commissioned the National Institute of Scientific Research to study the impact of the railway on survival of salmon eggs in the Nipissis River, and to provide recommendations. The question is whether the vibrations from the average of 12 trains along the valley cause increased mortality.

== Lakes ==
Lakes in the Nipissis watershed include:

River	Lakes
Nipissis	Lac Brézel, Lac Lahaie, Lac Kakatiak, Lac Debor, Lac Vigneau, Lac Nipissis, Lac Franchetot, Lac Dubuc, Lac Favre, Lac Françoise, Lacs Siamois
McDonald	Lac Lorna, Lac Pollock
Nipisso	See Lake Nipisso for list
Wacouno	Lac Zorch, Lac Mamikan, Lac Kyra, Lac Canatiche, Lac Roland, Lac Waco, Lac Doiron, Lac Tremblay, Lac la Mule, Lac Harold, Lac Labrie, Lac Orignal, Lac Wacouno, Lac Saint-Patrice, Lacs à François
Kachipitonkas	Lac Kachipitonkas, Lac Mimi, Lac Carmelle, Lac Croissant, Lax du Banc de Sable, Lac Perdrix, Lac Dufresne, Lac Alun, Lac Kitten
Matinipi	Lac Matinapi
Mistamoue	Lac Métaoca, Lac Aldeux, Lac Mistamoue, Lac Mistassini, Lac Chicomo

== Sources ==
- Auger, Tommy (8 August 2019), "Une étude portera sur l'effet du transport ferroviaire sur le saumon de la rivière Nipissis", Ma Côte-Nord (in French)
- Bassin versant de la rivière Moisie (in French), Ministère de l'Environnement et de la Lutte contre les changements climatiques
- Beaudet, Patrice, La Rivière Nipissis, un topo de glace (PDF) (in French)
- "En bref, Rivière Nipissis", Saumon Québec (in French)
- Le Camp-Adams (in French), Commission de toponymie du Québec
- MRC de Sept-Rivières (PDF) (map) (in French), Gouvernement du Québec, 23 August 2006
- Morasse, Mathieu (7 February 2019), "ITUM officialise l'achat de la pourvoirie Moisie-Nipissis", Le Nord-Côtier (in French)
- N'Binkéna Nantob-Bikatui (2011), Localisation du lac Carheil dans le bassin versant de la rivière Moisie (PDF) (Map showing the river and reserve) (in French), OBV Duplessis, archived from the original (PDF) on 2019-09-21
- Rivière Matinipi (in French), Ressources naturelles Canada
- Rivière McDonald (in French), Ressources naturelles Canada
- Rivière Nipissis (in French), Commission de toponymie du Québec
- Rivière Nipissis (in French), Ressources naturelles Canada
- Rivière Wacouno (in French), Ressources naturelles Canada
- van Haeren, Maarten (2017), "Nipissis River Area, Le Mur du 51, New Routes", American Alpine Journal, American Alpine Club
