= Moisie River =

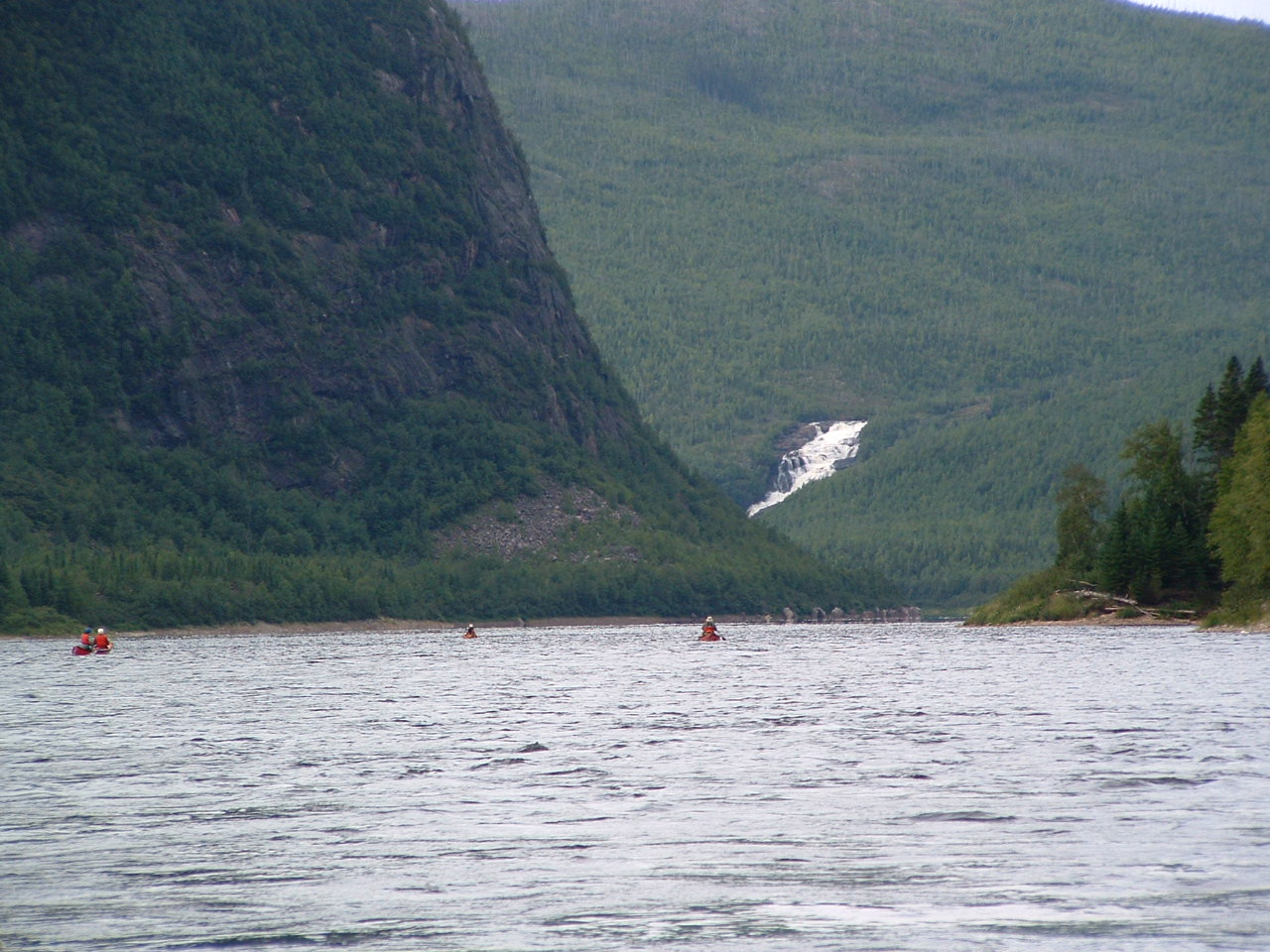

Location
- Country: Canada
- Province: Quebec
- Region: Côte-Nord

Physical characteristics
- Source: Lake Opocopa
  - location: Rivière-Mouchalagane
  - coordinates: 52°30′50″N 66°33′56″W
- Mouth: Gulf of Saint Lawrence
  - location: Sept-Îles
  - coordinates: 50°12′00″N 66°04′03″W
  - elevation: 0 m (0 ft)
- Length: 410 km (250 mi)
- Basin size: 19,273 km^{2} (7,441 sq mi)
- Discharge
  - average: 490 m^{3}/s (17,000 cu ft/s)

The Moisie River (French pronunciation: [mwazi]) is a river in eastern Quebec. Known as the Nahanni of the East, it is a wild river of North America.

It has been proposed to protect the river with the Moisie River Aquatic Reserve.

== Course ==
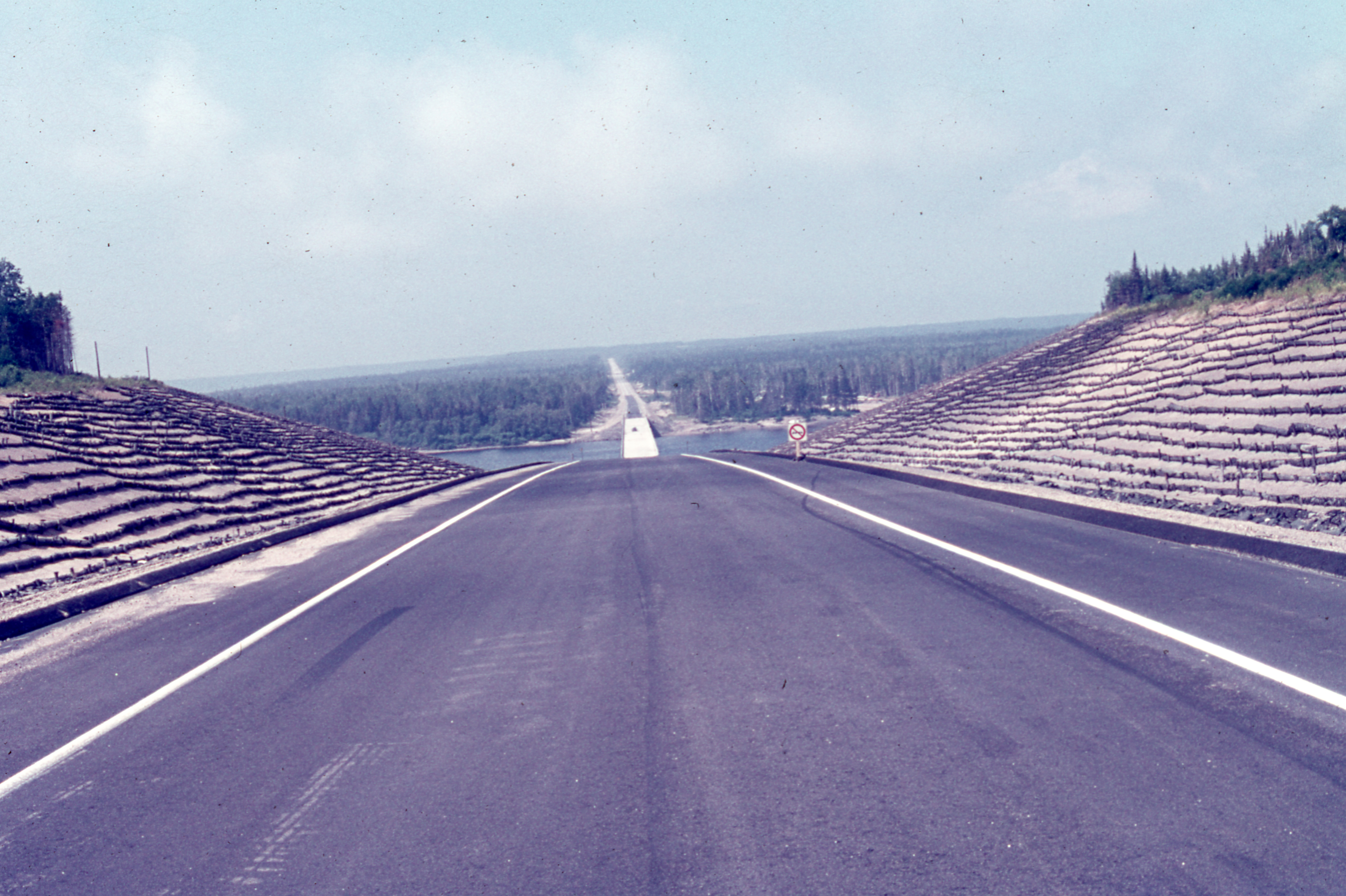
Highway 138 East, Donald Gallienne Bridge over the Moisie River, from Sept-Îles (City), from the hamlet of Matamec, towards Moisie (Village)

The Moisie River basin lies between the basins of the Rapides River to the west and the Matamec River to the east. It covers an area of 19,273 square kilometres (7,441 sq mi). The Moisie flows south from Lake Opocopa near the Labrador border to the north shore of the Saint Lawrence River east of Sept-Îles, Quebec. The town of Moisie is located at its mouth. The river is 410 kilometres (250 mi) in length, which is calculated from the most commonly used starting point of canoe trips, bridge of highway 389 over Pékans River (at 52°43′48.19″N 67°24′47.31″W ) is 373 km.

Moisie tributaries include:

- Aux Pékans River
  - Carheil River (via Pékans)
- Nipissis River
- Caopacho River
- Ouapetec River
- Joseph River

== Name ==
The origin of the name are unknown, but researchers have speculated that the river might have been named after an explorer or a settler since Moisy is a rather common surname in France. That is largely contested since there seems to be no proof of anyone with that name in the archives. Another popular theory is that it come from the Old French word moise or moyse, meaning "wet river bank."

The Mishta-shipiunnu ("Innu from the Moisie River") call it Mishta-shipu ("Great River"; mishau - ″big, great″ and shipu - ″river"). Like for thousands of years, they continue to use the river to reach their northern hunting and fishing grounds. Large parts of the river were also protected by private fishing clubs.

There were recent attempts to develop hydroelectric projects on the Moisie. However, in 2003, the Quebec government protected a large part of the river's watershed as an aquatic reserve and has prevented activities such as logging, mining, and power projects, but has permitted traditional uses such as hunting and fly-fishing.

== Environment ==
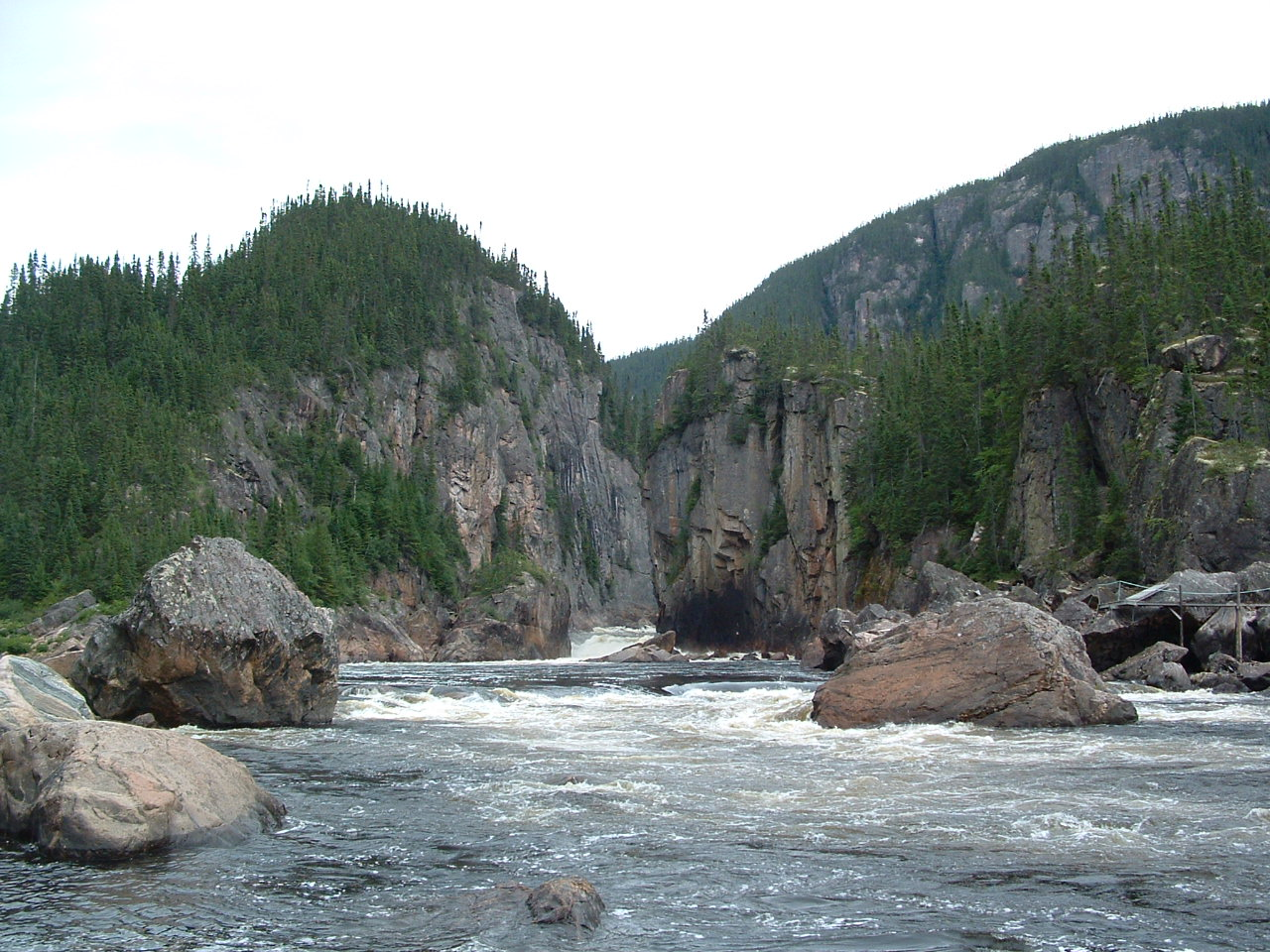
Katchapahun Rapid with Salmon Ladder

A map of the Ecological regions of Quebec shows the river's tributary, the Rivière aux Pékans, rising to the northwest of Fermont just west of the Spruce/lichen domain of the boreal zone, and flowing south through the eastern spruce/moss domain. The last section of the Moisie River flows through the fir/white birch domain of the boreal zone.

The river is the most important spawning ground for the Atlantic salmon in eastern North America.

== Usage ==
The Moisie River is popular with experienced canoeists concerning its whitewater. It flows through a deep valley of glacial origin. The width of the valley varies considerably. At the spout of the river, the valley is very narrow, but it is wider in areas that are not obstructed by rapids.

The views of mountains and cliffs have caused the river to be used for canoe camping. The Quebec North Shore & Labrador Railway follows the lower section of the Moisie River and provides access to the Quebec-Labrador plateau from which canoeists can reach its headwaters.

The river's remoteness makes it have very few access points, and if an accident occurs involving a canoeist, the most common form of evacuation is by seaplane. Still, because of the narrow valley, some canoeists travel many kilometres to reach a spot for a plane to land. The railway crosses the river at the last whitewater rapid on the river, which is also the largest and the most well known. The rapids have been called train tracks because of their close proximity to the railway.

A forest fire in the summer of 2014 destroyed a lot of the ecosystem surrounding the river and made it unsafe for campers and canoeists to explore and venture.

The river is very remote and has very few inhabitants, with few cabins along the river.

== See also ==
- List of Quebec rivers

== Sources ==
- Conservation plan, Moisie River Aquatic Reserve, Quebec, February 2003
- Portrait préliminaire de la zone de gestion intégrée de l'eau par bassin versant Duplessis (PDF) (in French), OBV Duplessis, April 2015
- Saucier, J.-P.; Robitaille, A.; Grondin, P.; Bergeron, J.-F.; Gosselin, J. (2011), Les régions écologiques du Québec méridional (PDF) (map), 4 (in French), Ministère des Ressources naturelles et de la Faune
