= Rivière-Nipissis =

- Unorganized territory
- Location in Côte-Nord region of Quebec
- Coordinates: 51°15′N 65°55′W
- Country: Canada
- Province: Quebec
- Region: Côte-Nord
- RCM: Sept-Rivières
- Constituted: January 1, 1986

Government
  - Federal riding: Côte-Nord—Kawawachikamach—Nitassinan
  - Prov. riding: Duplessis

Area
  - Total: 10,574.82 km^{2} (4,082.96 sq mi)
  - Land: 9,522.28 km^{2} (3,676.57 sq mi)

Population (2021)
  - Total: 0
  - Density: 0/km^{2} (0/sq mi)
  - Pop (2016-21): N/A
  - Dwellings: 0
- Time zone: UTC−5 (EST)
  - Summer (DST): UTC−4 (EDT)
- Area codes: 418 and 581
- Highways: No major routes

Rivière-Nipissis (French pronunciation: [ʁivjɛʁ nipisis]) is an unorganized territory in the Côte-Nord region of Quebec, Canada, part of the Sept-Rivières Regional County Municipality.

The eponymous Nipissis River is a left tributary of the Moisie River, with its source north of Lake Siamois. Nipissis, first identified as such in 1892 by surveyor Vincent, comes from the Innu language meaning "small body of water" or "small stream". In previous centuries, the river was also known as Little Saguenay and Moisie River East Branch.

== Demographics ==
As with neighboring territories Lac-Jerome and Petit-Mecatina, Rivière-Nipissis has been completely uninhabited since at least 1991.

Historical census populations – Rivière-Nipissis, Quebec

Year	Pop.	±%
1991	0	—
1996	0	0.00%
2001	0	0.00%
2006	0	0.00%

Year	Pop.	±%
2011	0	0.00%
2016	0	0.00%
2021	0	0.00%

Source: Statistics Canada

== See also ==
- List of unorganized territories in Quebec
