= List of Canadian railways =

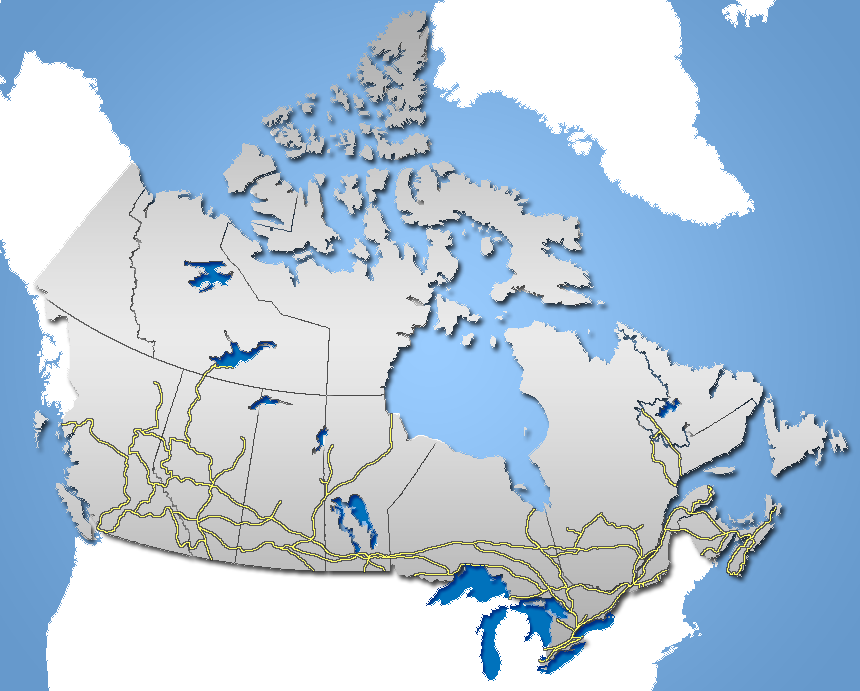
Major railways in Canada

== Freight railways by province ==
=== National ===
image	Name	Reporting marks	Locale	Ownership	Notes
	Canadian National	CN	British Columbia, Alberta, Saskatchewan, Manitoba, Northwest Territories, Ontario, Quebec, New Brunswick, Nova Scotia	Publicly traded corporation	
	CPKC	CPKC	British Columbia, Alberta, Saskatchewan, Manitoba, Ontario, Quebec	Publicly traded corporation	

=== Multiple provinces ===
Image	Name	Reporting marks	Locale	Ownership	Notes
	Bloom Lake Railway	WLRS	Bloom Lake Mine to WLR junction	Cliffs Natural Resources	Operates in Quebec and Labrador; privately owned, not a common carrier; operated under contract by Genesee & Wyoming
	BNSF Railway	BNSF	Vancouver to US border (Washington State), Saskatchewan border	Berkshire Hathaway	Major US railway with small section of directly owned operations in British Columbia and Saskatchewan
	CSX Transportation	CSXT	Sarnia, ON to Sombra, ON	CSX Corporation	Major US railway with small section of direct operations in Ontario
	Knob Lake and Timmins Railway	KLT	Schefferville to Iron Mines on the Québec/Labrador border	Genesee & Wyoming	Operates in Newfoundland and Labrador.
	Nipissing Central Railway	NCR	Swastika, ON to Rouyn-Noranda, QC	Ontario Northland Railway	
	Ontario Northland Railway	ONT	North Bay to Hearst, Moosonee, or Rouyn-Noranda	Ontario Northland Transportation Commission, a governmental entity	Operates in Ontario and Quebec. Also carries passengers
	Ottawa Valley Railway	OVR	Sudbury to Témiscaming	Genesee & Wyoming	Operates in Ontario and Quebec
	Quebec North Shore and Labrador Railway	QNSL	Sept-Îles to Wabush	Iron Ore Company of Canada	Operates in Quebec and Labrador; private service, not a common carrier
	Tshiuetin Rail Transportation	TSH	Schefferville to QNSF junction	First nations owned	Operates in Newfoundland and Labrador. Also carries passengers.

=== Alberta ===
Name	Reporting marks	Locale	Ownership	Notes
Alberta Prairie Steam Tours Ltd.	APXX	Big Valley and Botha to Canadian Pacific West Stettler Junction	Alberta Prairie Steam Tours Ltd. Private Company Shortline Freight	The oldest of all the privately owned shortlines in Alberta. Former Canadian Pacific Lacombe Subdivision and former Canadian National Stettler Subdivisions. Primary markets are grains, fertilizer, rail car storage and passenger train day trips.
Battle River Railway	BRR	Alliance to Canadian National Camrose Junction	Battle River Railway New Generation Co-operative Cooperative Shortline Freight	
Forty Mile Rail	FMRX	Stirling to Foremost	Cooperative Shortline Freight	Former Canadian Pacific Stirling Subdivision. The Primary market for Forty Mile Rail's services is expected to be grain and pulse production. Future potential may include oil movement and other non-grain products.
Mackenzie Northern Railway	RLGN	Alberta to Northwest Territories	Canadian National Railway (2006)	
Northern Alberta Railways	NAR	Alberta to British Columbia	Canadian National	

=== British Columbia ===
Name	Reporting marks	Locale	Ownership	Notes
BC Rail	BCOL	Surrey to Roberts Bank Superport	Provincially owned	Terminal railway that is the last publicly managed portion of a formerly large scale system; the BC government still technically owns the North Vancouver to Prince George line, although it is leased to and managed by CN
Englewood Railway	ER-WFP	Woss to Beaver Cove	Western Forest Products	Privately owned; not a common carrier
Grand Forks Railway Inc.	GFR	Grand Forks to Grand Forks Jct.	International Forest Products Ltd. d.b.a. "Interfor" and Regional District of Kootenay Boundary	
Kelowna Pacific Railway	KPR	Kelowna/Lumby to Kamloops	KnightHawk Rail Ltd.	Fallen Flag. Went into receivership in 2013. Ownership of infrastructure reverted to CNR. As of Nov 2015 the Coldstream to Kelowna portion was abandoned and torn up.
Kettle Falls International Railway	KFR	Laurier, WA to Grand Forks & Carson and Waneta to Columbia Gardens	OmniTRAX	Majority of the line's trackage is contained in the US
Nelson & Fort Sheppard Railway Corporation	NFTS	Columbia Gardens to Park Siding	Atco Wood Products	
Southern Railway of British Columbia	SRY	Vancouver to Chilliwack	URS Corporation	
Southern Railway of Vancouver Island	SVI	Victoria to Courtenay	URS Corporation	

=== Manitoba ===
Name	Reporting marks	Locale	Ownership	Notes
BNSF Manitoba	BNML	Winnipeg to BNSF lines at US border (North Dakota)	Subsidiary of BNSF Railway	
Boundary Trail Railway	BTRC	Morden to Binney Siding	Privately owned	Owns abandoned line west to Killarney.
Central Manitoba Railway	CEMR	Winnipeg to Graysville and Pine Falls	Cando Rail Services Ltd.	
Greater Winnipeg Water District Railway	GWWD	Winnipeg to Shoal Lake, Ontario	City of Winnipeg	Not a common carrier. Governmental railway used to service city aqueduct.
Hudson Bay Railway	HBRY	The Pas to Churchill The Pas to Flin Flon	Arctic Gateway Group	
Keewatin Railway	KRC	The Pas to Lynn Lake	Tribally owned	Also carries passengers.
Lake Line Railroad	LLRR	Selkirk to Gimli Beausejour to CP Keewatin Subdivision		

=== New Brunswick ===
Name	Reporting marks	Locale	Ownership	Notes
Maine Northern Railway	MNRY	St Léonard to the Maine Border	New Brunswick Southern Railway	
New Brunswick Southern Railway	NBSR	Saint John to St. Stephen	J.D. Irving Limited	
Springfield Terminal Railway	ST	St. Stephen to US border (Maine)	Pan Am Railways	

=== Newfoundland and Labrador ===
Name	Reporting marks	Locale	Ownership	Notes
Wabush Lake Railway	WLR	Labrador City to Wabush	Cliffs Natural Resources	Privately owned; not a common carrier

=== Nova Scotia ===
Name	Reporting marks	Locale	Ownership	Notes
Cape Breton and Central Nova Scotia Railway	CBNS	Truro to Sydney	Genesee & Wyoming	inactive since 2015
Sydney Coal Railway	SCR	Sydney to Lingan Power Plant	Logistec Inc.	

=== Ontario ===
Name	Reporting marks	Locale	Ownership	Notes
Algoma Central Railway	AC	Sault Ste. Marie to Hearst	Subsidiary of Canadian National Railway	Also carries passengers
Arnprior-Nepean Railway	ANR	Arnprior to Nepean		
Essex Terminal Railway	ETL	Amherstburg to Windsor, Ontario	Essex Morterm Holdings	
Barrie-Collingwood Railway	BCRY	Barrie Area	Corporation of the City of Barrie	Shortline that runs through Barrie and Innisfil on former CN Meaford Sub and Breton Spur
Goderich-Exeter Railway	GEXR	Brampton to Goderich via London and Stratford	Genesee & Wyoming	
Guelph Junction Railway	GJR	Guelph to Campbellville	Municipally owned, but operated by Ontario Southland Railway	
Huron Central Railway	HCRY	Sudbury to Sault Ste. Marie	Genesee & Wyoming	
Minnesota, Dakota and Western Railway	MDW	US border (Minnesota) to Fort Frances	Boise Cascade	US short line railway that owns trackage to serve one major Canadian customer
Ontario Southland Railway	OSRX	Woodstock to Tillsonburg or St. Thomas	Independently owned	
Port Colborne Harbour Railway	PCHR	St. Catharines to Port Colborne	Trillium Railways	
Southern Ontario Railway	RLHH	Brantford to Nanticoke via Hamilton	Genesee & Wyoming	
Vale Railway	VAEX	Sudbury to nickel mines	Vale Inco	Privately owned; not a common carrier

=== Quebec ===
Name	Reporting marks	Locale	Ownership	Notes
Chemin de fer Arnaud	CFA	Sept-Îles to port facilities	Cliffs Natural Resources	Privately owned, not a common carrier
Cartier Railway	Cartier	Port-Cartier to Mont Wright mine	ArcelorMittal	Privately owned, not a common carrier
Charlevoix Railway	CFC	Quebec City to Clermont	Groupe Le Massif Inc.	Also carries passengers
Chemin de fer Lanaudière	CFL	Joliette to Saint-Felix	Independently owned	
Chemin de fer de l'Outaouais	CFO	Gatineau to Wakfield	Municipally owned	
Gaspésie Railway Society	SFG	Matapédia to Gaspé	Avignon Regional County Municipality Bonaventure Regional County Municipality Le Rocher-Percé Regional County Municipality La Côte-de-Gaspé Regional County Municipality	
Quebec Gatineau Railway	QGRY	Quebec City to Gatineau via Montreal	Genesee & Wyoming	
Chemin de fer de la Rivière Romaine	CFRR	Havre-Saint-Pierre to iron mine	QIT-Fer et Titane	Privately owned, not a common carrier
Roberval and Saguenay Railway	RS	Jonquière to La Baie	Rio Tinto Alcan	
Port of Montreal Railway	POM	Port of Montreal to CN/CP junctions	Montreal Port Authority, a federal governmental entity	
Sartigan Railway	CFS	Vallée-Jonction to CN Montmagny Subdivision	Independently owned	
St. Lawrence and Atlantic Railroad	SLQ	Montreal to US border (Vermont) via Sherbrooke	Genesee & Wyoming	Majority of the line's trackage is in the US

=== Saskatchewan ===
Name	Reporting marks	Locale	Ownership	Notes
Big Sky Rail	BGS	Delisle to Beechy, Macrorie to Laporte, and Wartime to Kyle	subsidiary of Mobil Grain Ltd.	
Carlton Trail Railway	CTRW	Warman to Birch Hills or White Star or to Pulp Mill (Prince Albert)	OmniTRAX	
Fife Lake Railway	FLR	Hart Butte to GWR junction	Municipally owned; operated by Great Western Railway	
Great Sandhills Railway	GSR	Swift Current to Burstall	Independently owned	
Great Western Railway	GWRS	Assinboia or Bracken to CPR junction	Independently owned local cooperative; managed by WestCan Rail	
Last Mountain Railway	LMR	Regina to Davidson	partnership of Mobil Grain Ltd. and municipal governments	
Long Creek Railroad	LCRI	Estevan to Tribune	Independently owned	
Northern Lights Rail	NLR	Melfort to Birch Hills		
Poplar River Mine Railway	PRMX	Great Western Railway in Coronach to Poplar River Mine and Poplar River Power Station	Westmoreland Mining	
Red Coat Road and Rail	RCRR	Pangman to GWR junction	Municipally owned, but operated by GWR	
Southern Rails Cooperative	SORA	Moose Jaw to Parry	Farmer-owned cooperative	
Stewart Southern Railway	SSS	Stoughton to Richardson	Independently owned	
Thunder Rail	TR	Arborfield to CN junction	Municipally owned	
Torch River Rail	TRRR	Choiceland to Nipawin	Municipally owned	
Wheatland Railway	WRI	St. Louis to Tozke	Municipally owned, but operated by Canadian National Railway	

== Freight railways with trackage rights only ==
Name	Reporting marks	Locale	Ownership	Notes
Maine Central Railroad	MEC	US border (Maine) to Saint John, NB	Pan Am Railways	US railway with trackage rights over New Brunswick Southern line
Norfolk Southern Railway	NS	US border (Michigan) to Windsor, ON; or US border (New York) to Niagara Falls, ON	Publicly traded corporation	Major US railway with brief trackage rights over Canadian Pacific (Windsor) and Canadian National (Fort Erie to Niagara Falls) lines
New England Central Railroad	NECR	US border (Vermont) to Quebec City via Montreal	RailAmerica	US railway with trackage rights over Canadian National line
Union Pacific Railroad	UP	US border (Washington) to Vancouver	Publicly traded corporation	Major US railway with trackage rights over BNSF line

== Passenger railways ==
Name	Reporting marks	Locale	Ownership	Notes
Capital Railway	CR	Ottawa	City of Ottawa	Line 2 is a federally regulated rail line operated under the name "Capital Railway"
Exo commuter rail	EXO	Greater Montreal	Exo, a provincial entity	3 commuter routes with trackage rights over CP lines, 2 commuter routes with trackage rights over CN lines, 1 owned
GO Transit	GOT	Greater Toronto and Hamilton Area	Metrolinx, a provincial entity	3 commuter routes with trackage rights over CN lines, 1 commuter route with trackage rights over CP lines, 3 owned and operated commuter lines
Ontario Northland Railway	ONT	Cochrane ON to Moosonee ON	Ontario Northland Transportation Commission, a provincial crown agency	1 active route on owned tracks
Rocky Mountaineer	RMRX	Vancouver or Calgary to Banff, Jasper, and Whistler	Armstrong Group	3 tour routes operating over CN tracks, 1 tour route operating over CP tracks
Union Pearson Express	UPX	Toronto to Mississauga	Metrolinx, a Provincial crown corporation	Operates over GO Transit's Weston Subdivision/Kitchener Line for most of its route.
Via Rail	VIA	British Columbia, Alberta, Saskatchewan, Manitoba, Ontario, Quebec, New Brunswick, Nova Scotia	Federally owned	Operates 9 routes (the most major of which has 7 variations), mainly along CP and CN tracks
West Coast Express	BCVX	Mission to Vancouver	TransLink, a provincial entity	1 commuter route with trackage rights over CP line

== Urban rail transit ==
Name	Locale	Ownership	Notes
CTrain	Calgary	Calgary Transit	2 light rail lines
Edmonton LRT	Edmonton	Edmonton Transit Service	3 light rail lines
Ion	Waterloo Region	Grand River Transit	1 light rail line
Montreal Metro	Montreal, Laval, and Longueuil	Societé de Transport de Montréal	4 heavy rail metro lines (running on tires)
O-Train	Ottawa	OC Transpo	2 light rail lines
Toronto Subway	Toronto and Vaughan	Toronto Transit Commission	3 heavy rail metro lines and 2 light rail lines
Toronto Streetcar System	Toronto	Toronto Transit Commission	11 streetcar lines
Vancouver SkyTrain	Vancouver, Burnaby, New Westminster, Surrey, Richmond	TransLink	3 light metro lines

== See also ==
- List of heritage railways in Canada
- List of Ontario railways
- Oldest railroads in North America
- Rail transport in Canada
