= Western Labrador Rail Services =

Rail operation

Western Labrador Rail Services, Inc.
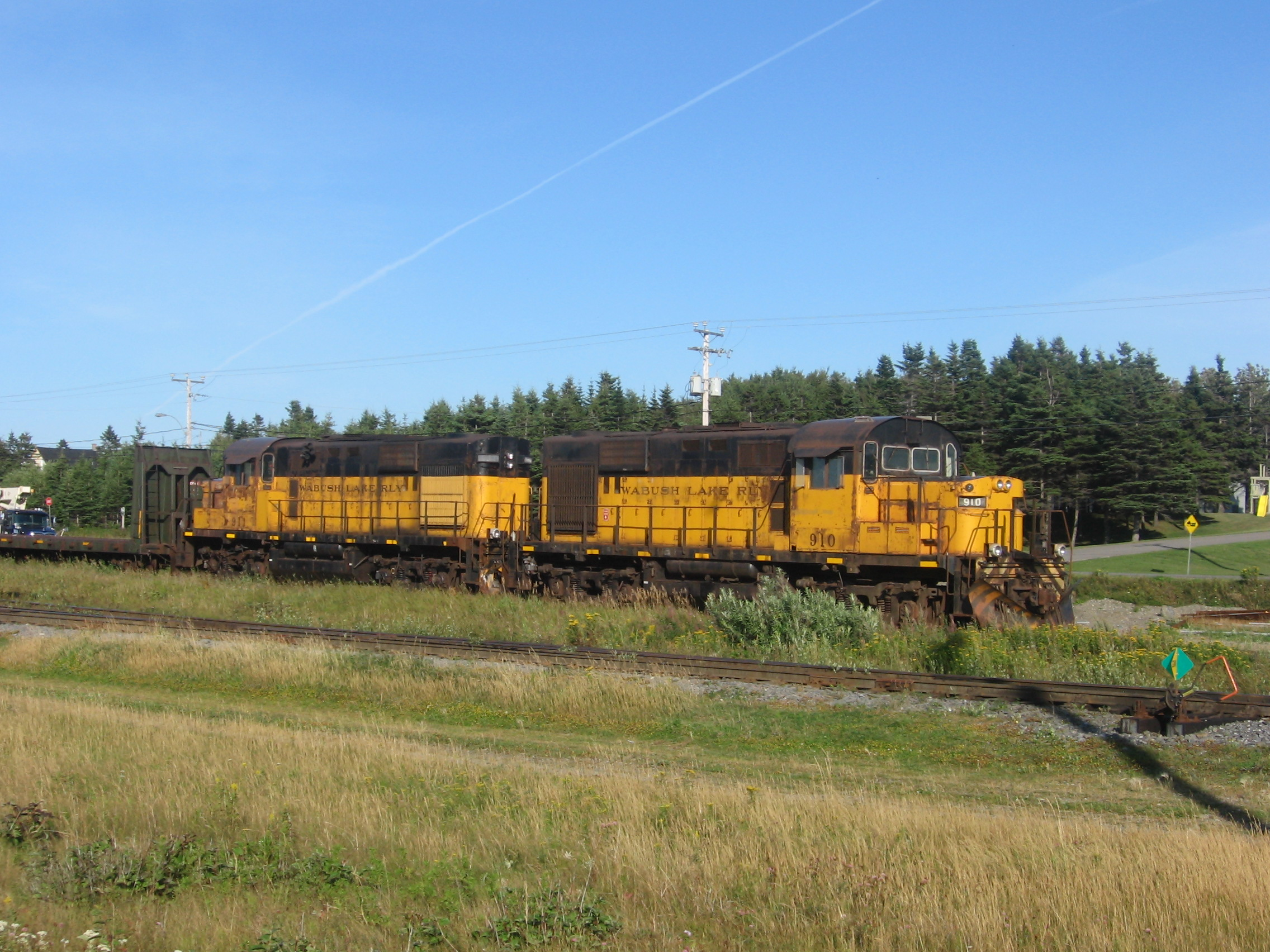
- Two MLW RS-18s pull a freight train in 2013

Overview
- Headquarters: Wabush, Newfoundland and Labrador
- Reporting mark: WLRS
- Locale: Newfoundland and Labrador; Québec
- Dates of operation: 2011–

Western Labrador Rail Services, Inc. (reporting mark WLRS) is a rail operation of Genesee & Wyoming Canada, Inc. created in 2010 by the combination of three short line railways: Arnaud Railway, Bloom Lake Railway, and Wabush Lake Railway. The operation provides rail transportation services to mining companies operating in the provinces of Newfoundland and Labrador and Québec, Canada.

Consolidated Thompson Iron Mines opened the Bloom Lake Mine, just west of Labrador City, Newfoundland. The 31 km (19 mi) Bloom Lake Railway was commissioned to transport iron ore from the mine to a connection with the Wabush Lake Railway. The Bloom Lake Railway was constructed between 2006 and 2010. All of the railway, except the first 2 km (1.2 mi), are located in Labrador.

The Wabush Lake Railway began acting as a middle man, taking the Bloom Lake Railway trains, and transporting them to Wabush Junction for the Quebec North Shore and Labrador Railway to transport to the Chemin de fer Arnaud. The Arnaud then takes the trains to the Consolidated Thompson's dock at Pointe-Noire, Quebec.

Consolidated Thompson was purchased by Cliffs Natural Resources. In 2011, Genesee & Wyoming began control of all of these operations on behalf of Cliffs under the name Western Labrador Rail Services. These operations form an isolated railroad network, as it does not interchange with any other rail lines on the North American network. On April 11, 2016, Québec Iron Ore, Inc. (a subsidiary of Champion Iron Limited and Resources Québec) purchased the Bloom Lake Mining Complex and Bloom Lake Railway infrastructure from Cliffs Natural Resources. The Bloom Lake Railway continues to be operated under contract by WLRS.
