= Rail speed limits in the United States =

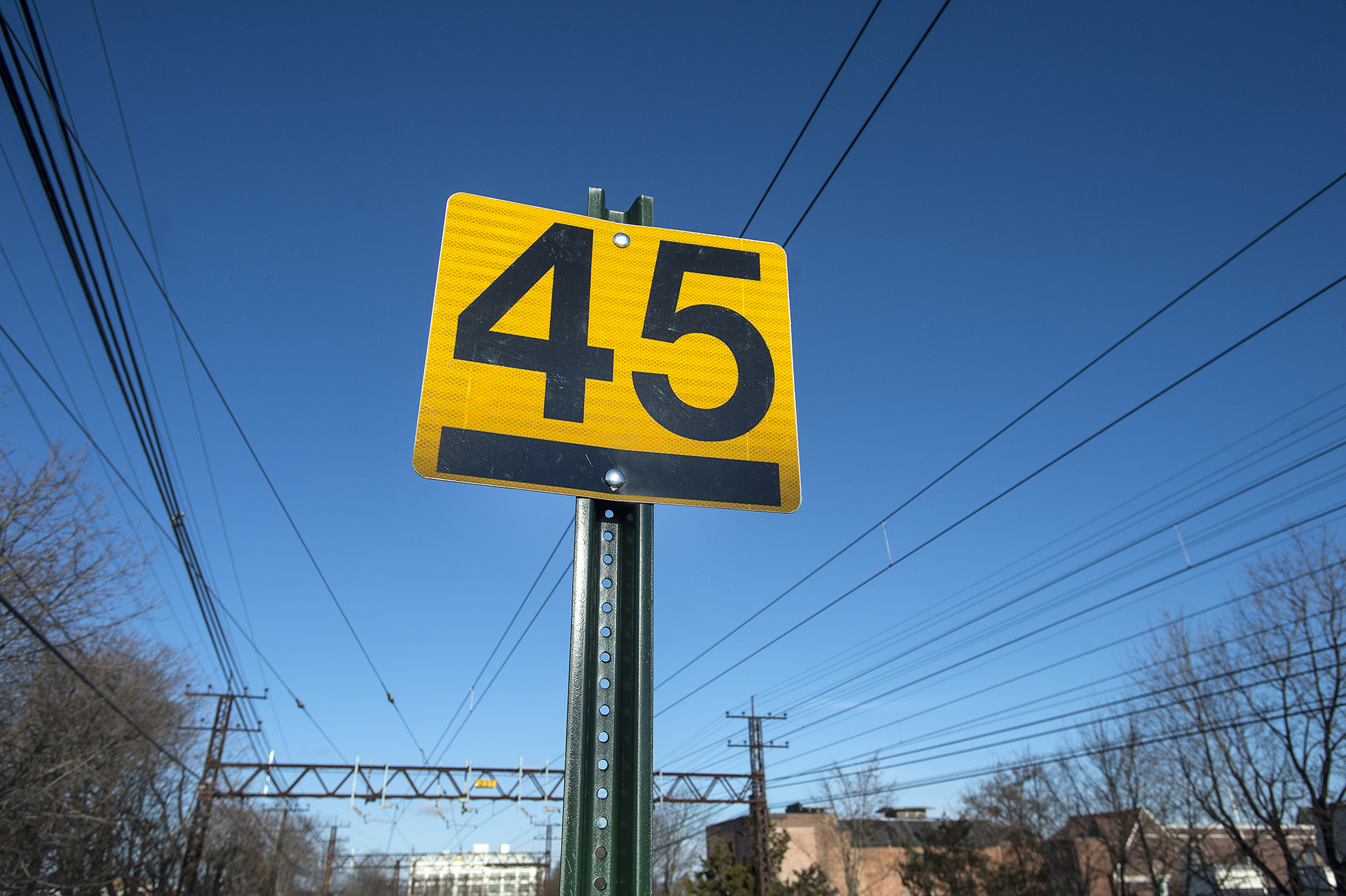
A 45-mile-per-hour (72 km/h) speed restriction sign at Metro-North Railroad's Port Chester station

Rail speed limits in the United States are regulated by the Federal Railroad Administration. Railroads also implement their own limits and enforce speed limits. Speed restrictions are based on a number of factors including curvature, signaling, track condition, and the presence of grade crossings. Like road speed limits in the United States, speed limits for tracks and trains are measured in miles per hour (mph).

== Signal speeds ==
Federal regulators set train speed limits based on the signaling systems in use. Passenger trains were limited to 59 mph (95 km/h) and freight trains to 49 mph (79 km/h) on tracks without block signals, known as "dark territory." Trains without an automatic cab signal, train stop, or train control system were not allowed to exceed 79 mph (127 km/h). This rule, issued in 1947 and effective by the end of 1951, was a response to a serious 1946 crash in Naperville, Illinois, involving two trains.

Following a 1987 train collision in Maryland, freight trains in high-speed areas were required to have speed limiters that could forcibly slow trains, rather than just alerting the operator through in-cab signals. In the Maryland crash, the signal panel had been partially disabled, including a muted whistle and a missing light bulb.

In response to the 2008 Chatsworth train collision in California, a federal law required that positive train control (PTC) be implemented nationwide by 2015. After several extensions, the Federal Railroad Administration (FRA) announced on December 29, 2020, that PTC was operating on all required freight and passenger rail routes. While PTC’s main purpose is to prevent collisions, it also allows higher speeds in some cases. Different PTC systems are used in various regions across the country.

== Track classes ==
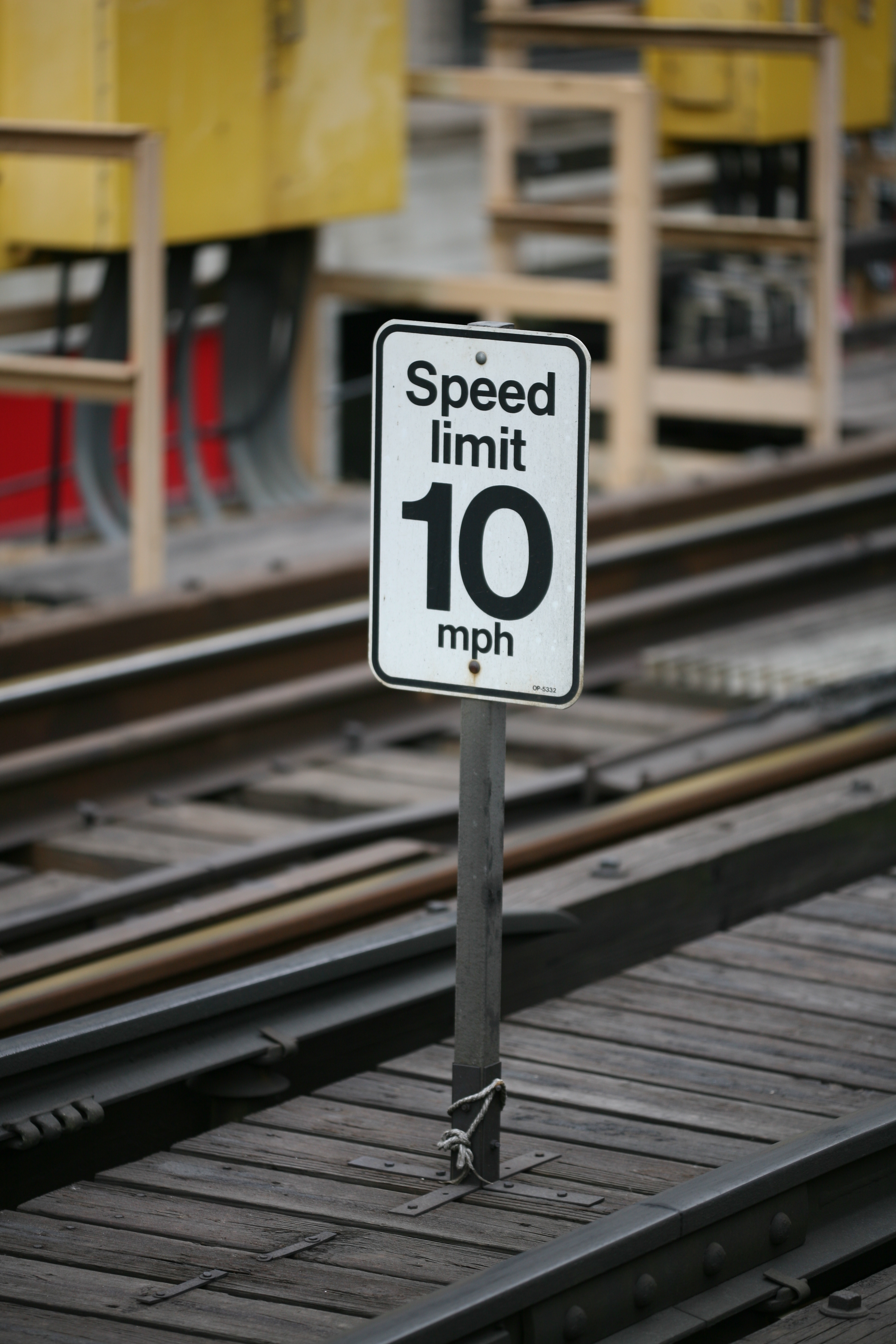
A 10-mile-per-hour (16 km/h) speed restriction sign along the Chicago "L"

In the United States, the Federal Railroad Administration has developed a system of classification for track quality. The class of a section of track determines the maximum possible running speed limits and the ability to run passenger trains.

Track type	Freight train	Passenger	Examples
Excepted (Note: Only freight trains are allowed to operate on Excepted track and they may only run at speeds up to 10 mph (16 km/h). Also, no more than five cars loaded with hazardous material may be operated within any single train. Passenger trains (in revenue service) of any type are prohibited.)	<10 mph (16 km/h)	not allowed	
Class 1	10 mph (16 km/h)	15 mph (24 km/h)	Much yard, branch line, short line, and industrial spur trackage falls into this category.
Class 2	25 mph (40 km/h)	30 mph (48 km/h)	Branch lines, secondary main lines, many regional railroads, and some tourist operations frequently fall into this class. Examples include the Burlington Northern Santa Fe (BNSF) branch from Sioux Falls to Madison, South Dakota; Napa Valley Wine Train’s 18-mile (29 km) ex-Southern Pacific Railroad line between Napa and St. Helena, California; and the entire Strasburg Rail Road, spanning 4 1/2 miles (7.2 km) between Strasburg and Leaman Place, Pennsylvania.
Class 3	40 mph (64 km/h)	60 mph (97 km/h)	BNSF between Spokane and Kettle Falls, Washington; and Canadian National’s Wisconsin Central line between Neenah, Wisconsin and Sault Ste. Marie, Michigan.
Class 4 (Note: Most mainline track, especially that owned by major railroads is Class 4 track)	60 mph (97 km/h)	80 mph (129 km/h)	Chicago’s Metra; and New England Central’s entire main line.
Class 5 (Note: Class 5 track is operated by freight railroads where freight train speeds are over 60 mph (97 km/h). On parts of the BNSF Railway's Chicago–Los Angeles mainline (historically, the old Santa Fe mainline), ATS-equipped passenger trains such as Amtrak's Southwest Chief can operate at up to 90 mph (145 km/h). This is gradually being reduced as the train stop system is retired, but freight trains over 60 mph still require class 5 track.)	80 mph (129 km/h)	90 mph (145 km/h)	Union Pacific's (UP's) Geneva, Clinton, and Boone subdivisions in Iowa between East Missouri Valley (near Council Bluffs) to the Illinois border near Clinton; UP’s main line between Council Bluffs and North Platte, Nebraska; Amtrak/SCRRA's and NCTD's Surf Line between Fullerton and San Diego, California.
Class 6	110 mph (177 km/h)		Parts of Amtrak’s Hartford Line between New Haven, Connecticut and Springfield, Massachusetts; most of Amtrak's Lincoln Service between Chicago, Illinois and St. Louis, Missouri; portions of Amtrak's Wolverine between Chicago and Pontiac, Michigan; and Brightline between West Palm Beach and Cocoa, Florida.
Class 7 (Note: Some of Amtrak's Northeast Corridor has Class 7 trackage.)	125 mph (201 km/h)		Most of Amtrak's Northeast Corridor; and Brightline between Orlando International Airport and Cocoa, FL.
Class 8 (Note: Portions of the Northeast Corridor are the only Class 8 trackage in North America allowing for 135 mph (217 km/h))	160 mph (257 km/h)		Texas Central Railway; 3 segments of the Northeast Corridor totaling 33.9 mi (54.6 km) in Rhode Island/Massachusetts and an additional 16 mi (26 km) in New Jersey; Brightline West will have Class 8 trackage on its 218 mi (351 km) route between Rancho Cucamonga, California and Las Vegas, Nevada, going at top speeds of 186 mph (299 km/h).
Class 9 (Note: There is currently no Class 9 high-speed rail in the United States, although Amtrak is currently undertaking test runs on Acela trains at 165 mph (266 km/h). California High-Speed Rail is planned to run at speeds up to 220 mph (354 km/h) and the Texas Central Railway is planned to run at 205 mph (330 km/h). In the future, Amtrak Avelia Liberty trains may operate along the Northeast Corridor at up to 186 mph (299 km/h).)	220 mph (354 km/h)		California High-Speed Rail between Merced and Bakersfield.

== Curves ==
Assuming a suitably maintained track, maximum track speed through curves is limited by the "centrifugal force" which acts to overturn the train. To compensate for this force, the track is superelevated (the outer rail is raised higher than the inner rail). The speed at which the centrifugal force is perfectly offset by the tilt of the track is known as the balancing speed. Maximum speed can be found using the following formula, which provides an allowance for trains to operate above the balancing speed:

$$V_{max}=\sqrt{\frac{E_a + E_u}{0.0007d}}$$

where:

$E_a$ is the amount in inches that the outside rail is superelevated above the inside rail on a curve
$E_u$ is the amount in inches of unbalanced superelevation
$d$ is the degree of curvature in degrees per 100 feet (30 m)
$V_{max}$ is given in miles per hour

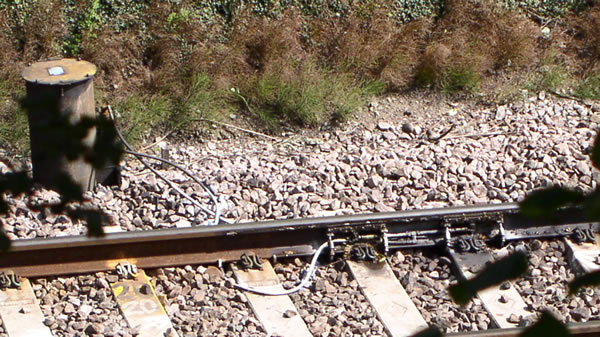
Track lubrication on a reverse curve in an area prone to movement due to wet beds

Normally, passenger trains run above the balancing speed, and the difference between the balancing superelevation for the speed and curvature and the actual superelevation on the curve is known as unbalanced superelevation. Track superelevation is usually limited to 6 inches (150 mm), and is often lower on routes with slow heavy freight trains in order to reduce wear on the inner rail. Allowed unbalanced superelevation in the U.S. is restricted to 3 inches (76 mm), though 6 inches (152 mm) is permissible by waiver. Tilting trains like the Acela operate with even higher unbalanced superelevation, by dynamically shifting the weight of the train. The actual overturning speed of a train is much higher than the limits set by the speed formula, which is largely in place for passenger comfort. There is no hard maximum unbalanced superelevation for European railways, some of which have curves with over 11 inches (280 mm) of unbalanced superelevation to permit high-speed transportation.

The allowed unbalanced superelevation will cause trains to run with normal flange contact. The points of wheel-rail contact are influenced by the tire profile of the wheels. Allowance has to be made for the different speeds of trains. Slower trains will tend to make flange contact with the inner rail on curves, while faster trains will tend to ride outwards and make contact with the outer rail. Either contact causes wear and tear and may lead to derailment if speeds and superelevation are not within the permitted limits. Many high-speed lines do not permit the use of slower freight trains, particularly with heavier axle loads. In some cases, the wear or friction of flange contact on curves is reduced by the use of flange lubrication.

== See also ==
- Slow zone
- Rail regulations in Canada
- Railroad operations
- Railway signalling
