= Aluminerie Alouette =

Canadian aluminium company

Coordinates: 50°9′16″N 66°27′4″W

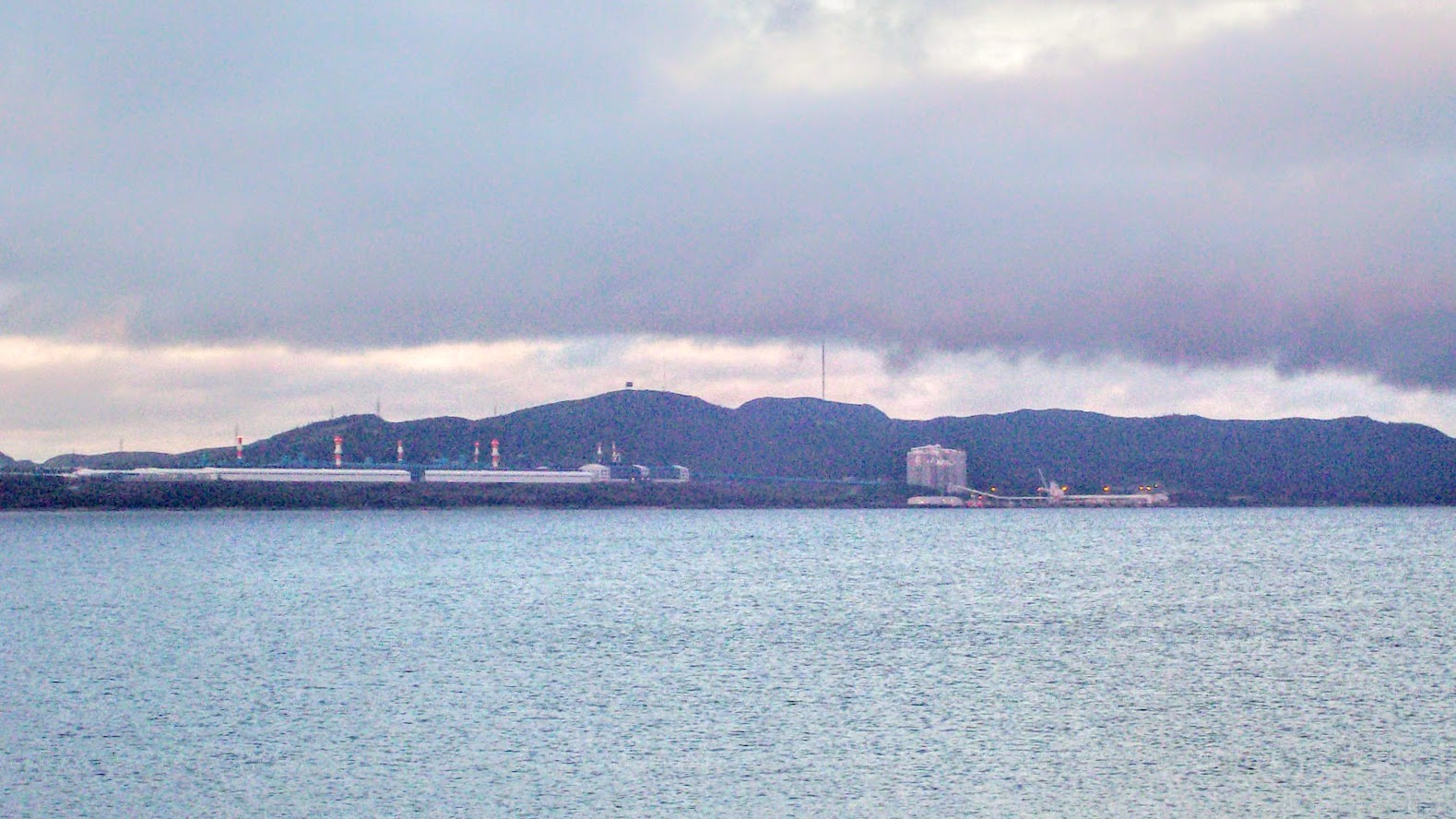
Alouette Aluminum Plant

Aluminerie Alouette is an aluminum manufacturing company based in Sept-Îles, Quebec, Canada, on the North Shore of the Gulf of St. Lawrence.

== History ==
In 2005, the Alouette Aluminum Smelter, at 550,000 metric tonnes capacity per year, became the largest primary aluminum smelter in the Americas.

The construction of an aluminum smelter at Sept-Îles was made possible with the completion of the Churchill Falls Hydro Electric project in Labrador in 1972. Electrical transmission lines from Churchill Falls, carrying power to the Hydro-Québec power grid, pass close to the city of Sept-Îles, with Hydro-Québec's Arnaud substation built on the outskirts of the city.

In 1989, attracted by Hydro-Québec's low power costs and the seaport facilities at Sept-Îles, Alouette built a 215,000 tonne per year smelter on Pointe-Noire, Quebec, located on the southern side of Sept-Îles Bay. The smelter was funded by an international consortium, consisting of Austria Metall AG (AMAG), Kobe Aluminum and Marubeni of Japan, Koninklijke Hoogovens of the Netherlands, Société générale de financement (SGF), and VAW of Germany.

In 2002, plans were approved to expand the smelter by more than double its original capacity. This phase 2 project was completed in September 2005. Since 2011, the Alouette Smelter uses 930 MW electricity at maximum production capacity.

Aluminerie Alouette is certified ISO 9001 (quality), ISO 17025 (laboratory quality and environmental analysis), ISO 14001 (environment) and OHSAS 18001 (health and safety).

== Current investors ==
- AMAG Austria Metall AG (Austria, 20%)
- Hydro Aluminium (Norway, 20%)
- Investissement Québec (Canada, 6.67%) through subsidiary Qualium ()
- Marubeni Metals & Minerals (Japan, 13.33%)
- Rio Tinto Alcan (Canada, 40%)
