= Slow zones on the Chicago "L" =

Areas where a train is forced to slow down On the Chicago L system

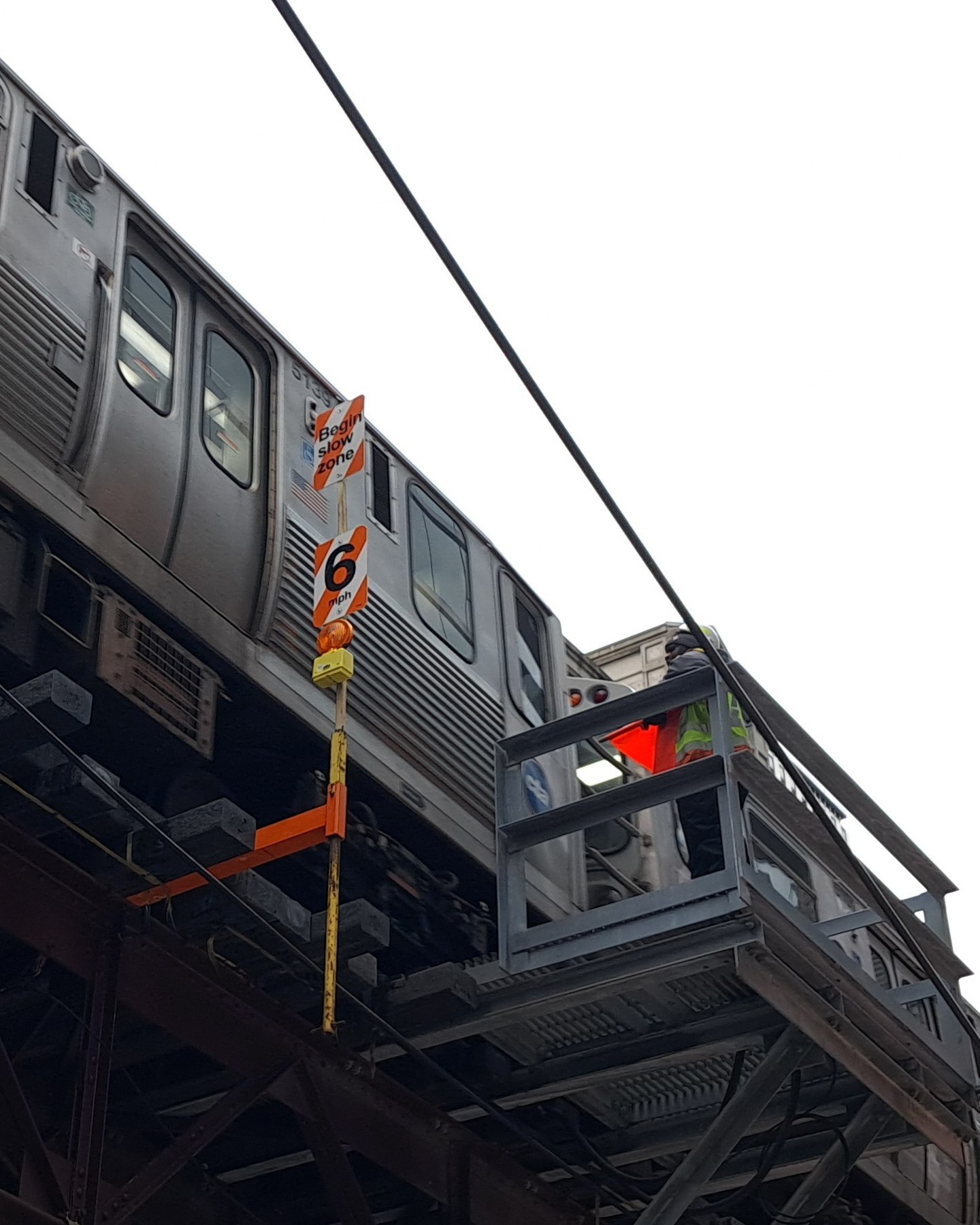
Chicago "L" train entering a slow zone on the Loop Elevated

Slow zones on the Chicago "L" are places of track where trains have to run at reduced speeds due to one or more reasons, such as bad track quality, structural issues (e.g. fouling of the ballast, damage to and failure of concrete retaining walls, rotting of wooden ties), signal issues, insufficient power, and construction occurring on or near the tracks. The most common cause of slow zones are deteriorating track conditions, with signal problems and construction a distant second and third, respectively. As of May 1st, 2026, slow zones covered a total of 202,961 ft (61,863 m), or 17.1% of the entire system.

As of April 2026, the Douglas branch of the Pink Line, the Evanston branch of the Purple Line, and the Englewood branch of the Green Line are the only segments of the Chicago "L" system without any slow zones.

== History ==
When the CTA first began publishing slow zone reports in July 2005, there were 108,360 ft (33,030 m) of slow zones on the system, representing about 8.5% of the system. By 2019, the amount of slow zones had climbed to 153,970 ft (46,930 m), or about 13.1% percent of the entire system. As a result of the 2023 Chicago train crash, the Yellow Line was put under slow zones, adding 35,156 ft (10,716 m) to the system. By February 2025, slow zones had reached a total of 351,542 ft (107,150 m), with over 30% of the entire system being slow zones.

In April 2025, slow zones on the Yellow Line were removed, and just a month later in May, slow zones had decreased to 212,547 ft (64,784 m), or 18.5% of the entire system. Slow zones continued to decrease into 2026 with April 2026 seeing just 202,961 ft (61,863 m) of slow zones, the lowest amount since October 2023.

== Operation ==
Not all slow zones slow down trains equally. The least severe of these slow zones limit train speeds to 35 miles per hour (56 km/h). More severe slow zones can limit trains to 25 miles per hour (40 km/h), and the most severe restrictions limit trains to 15 miles per hour (24 km/h). In some areas, although the official speed limit is 15 miles per hour (24 km/h), trains rarely exceed 6 miles per hour (9.7 km/h).

== Projects ==
The CTA has many different programs to address slow zones, with the largest being the Red-Purple Modernization, a multi-phase program with the eventual goal of replacing all aging tracks, stations, viaducts, and signal systems north of Belmont on the North Side Main Line, which carries the Red and Purple Lines. Phase 1 of the project was completed in 2025, and Phase 2 is currently in the planning stage.

Another major project is the Forest Park Branch Rebuild. The Forest Park Branch of the Blue Line is notable for how slow it is, with more than 80% of the track being classified as slow zones. The Forest Park Branch rebuild project will rebuild the branch in four phases. Phase 1 replaced track between LaSalle and Illinois Medical District stations, and was constructed between July and October 2023. Another portion of the rebuild project, not formally part of any phase, will replace track between Kedzie and Pulaski stations in 2027. Phases 2-4 are currently on hold while the CTA waits for the Eisenhower Expressway, which houses the line in its median, to be rebuilt. Since the Eisenhower is an interstate highway nearing the end of its useful life, the CTA hopes to piggyback on IDOT's reconstruction of the highway to receive federal funds with which it can rebuild the branch, though it will be some time before this happens, as no major work was planned for the Eisenhower in IDOT's 2022-2027 capital plan.
