= Slow zone =

Area where a train is forced to slow down in the United States

In the United States, a slow zone is an area where a train is forced to slow down for either structural, construction, power, signal, or track problems. Slow zones limit a train to about 10 to 35 miles per hour (16 to 56 km/h). Notification to train crews is referred to as a "slow order."

In the United Kingdom this is called a speed restriction.

== See also ==
- Rail speed limits in the United States
- Slow zones on the Chicago L
