= Canadian Transportation Agency =

Quasi-judicial tribunal of the Government of Canada

- Office des transports du Canada

Agency overview
- Formed: 1904; 122 years ago
- Preceding agency: Canadian Transport Commission
- Jurisdiction: Government of Canada
- Headquarters: Gatineau, Quebec, Canada
- Agency executive: Alain Langlois, Chair (June 1, 2026)
- Website: www.otc-cta.gc.ca

The Canadian Transportation Agency (CTA; French: Office des transports du Canada, OTC) is the independent, quasi-judicial tribunal of the Government of Canada that makes decisions relating to federally regulated modes of transportation (air, rail and marine). Its headquarters are at 60 Laval St., Gatineau, Quebec.

It is responsible for:

- Dispute resolution: to resolve complaints about transportation services, fares, rates, and charges;
- Accessibility: to ensure that the national transportation system is accessible, particularly to persons with disabilities; and
- Economic regulation: to provide approvals and licences and to make decisions on matters involving federally regulated air, rail, and marine transportation.

The agency is divided into six branches: Chair's Office; Legal Services and Secretariat Branch; Internal Services Branch; Dispute Resolution Branch; Determinations and Compliance Branch; Analysis and Outreach Branch.

The agency is headed by five full-time members, including the Chair, and the Vice Chair.

== History ==
The history of the Canadian Transportation Agency originates in February 1904 with the establishment of the Board of Railway Commissioners, an independent body with regulatory authority over railway, and later with jurisdiction over telegraphs, telephones, and express companies.

The Board of Railway Commissioners was replaced by the Board of Transportation Commissioners through the Transport Act in 1938; this new agency held authority over inland waterways and airlines in addition to those jurisdictions inherited by the Board of Railway Commissioners. On 11 September 1944, amendments to the Transport Act provided for "the removal of commercial air services from the jurisdiction of the Board of Transport Commissioners." At the same time, the Aeronautics Act created a new Air Transport Board to provide licensing and regulatory functions.

In 1967, National Transportation Act became law and established the Canadian Transport Commission (CTC)—absorbing most of the members and staff from the previous Board of Transport Commissioners, the Air Transport Board, and the Canadian Maritime Commission—with Jack Pickersgill as president. The CTC was given mandate over all modes of transportation in Canada, "with the object of co-ordinating and harmonizing the operations of all carriers engaged in transport by railways, water, aircraft, extra-provincial motor vehicle transport and commodity pipelines."

In 1976, communications services (telephone, telegraph) regulation was transferred from the CTC to the CRTC, the name of which was changed from the Canadian Radio and Television Commission to the Canadian Radio-Television and Telecommunications Commission.

In 1988, the new National Transportation Act overhauled the CTC and replaced it with the National Transportation Agency. On May 29, 1996, the Canada Transportation Act, also known as Bill C-14 (formerly C-101), received royal assent and established the Canadian Transportation Agency, which began operations on July 2.

Consumer responsibilities were expanded in 2000, when the post of Air Travel Complaints Commissioner was created under its stewardship. The first Air Travel Complaints Commissioner was Bruce Hood, a former veteran National Hockey League referee.

In 2020, the agency received 8000 complaints between March and September over airline policies to issue travel vouchers rather than refunds for passengers cancelling their flight bookings during the COVID-19 pandemic. The CTA posted on their website that airlines could issue travel vouchers instead of refunds, which caused Air Passenger Rights, an advocacy association, to file a lawsuit for CTA to remove this statement.

In September 2023, the Agency introduced a new system to handle air passenger complaints. In its first full year, the Complaint Resolution Office resolved more than 33,000 complaints in 2024–25, nearly three times as many as in 2022–23. However, the number of new complaints remained very high, with more than 40,000 received each year over the past three years and a record of over 46,000 in 2024–25. As a result, there were 84,398 unresolved complaints at the end of the fiscal year.

== Legislation ==
Canada Transportation Act

Parliament of Canada
- Citation: S.C. 1996, c. 10
- Royal assent: May 29, 1996
- Effective: July 1, 1996
- Administered by: Canadian Transportation Agency

Legislative history
- Bill title: Bill C-14 (formerly C-101)
- Third reading: March 25, 1996
- Status: Amended

The Canada Transportation Act is the Agency's enabling statute to implement the federal government's transportation policy.

The Agency also shares responsibility for administering other Acts and their related regulations, including:

- Accessible Canada Act, 2019
- Canada Marine Act
- Canadian Environmental Assessment Act, 2012
- Civil Air Navigation Services Commercialization Act
- Coasting Trade Act
- Energy Supplies Emergency Act
- Pilotage Act
- Railway Relocation and Crossing Act
- Railway Safety Act
- Shipping Conferences Exemption Act, 1987

The CTA has sole responsibility for the following regulations:

- Accessible Transportation Planning and Reporting Regulations (SOR-2021-243)
- Accessible Transportation for Persons with Disabilities Regulations (SOR/2019-244)
- Air Transportation Regulations (SOR/88-58)
- Air Passenger Protection Regulations (SOR/2019-150)
- Canadian Transportation Agency Designated Provisions Regulations (SOR/99-244)
- Regulations on Operational Terms for Rail Level of Services Arbitration (SOR/2014-192)
- Personnel Training for the Assistance of Persons with Disabilities Regulations (SOR/94-42)
- Railway Costing Regulations (SOR/80-310)
- Railway Interswitching Regulations (SOR/88-41)
- Railway Third Party Liability Insurance Coverage Regulations (SOR/96-337)
- Railway Traffic and Passenger Tariffs Regulations (SOR/96-338)
- Railway Traffic Liability Regulations (SOR/91-488)

The CTA shares responsibility for the following regulations:

- Transportation Information Regulations (SOR/96-334)
- Railway Company Pay Out of Excess Revenue for the Movement of Grain Regulations (SOR/2001-207)
- The Jacques-Cartier and Champlain Bridges Inc. Regulations (SOR/98-568)
- The Seaway International Bridge Corporation, Ltd. Regulations (SOR/98-569)

== Certificate of Fitness ==
The CTA is responsible for the issuance of a Certificate of Fitness for each federal railway. A board is required to evaluate details like insurance coverage, without which the railway cannot maintain its Certificate of Fitness.
