= Pointe-Noire, Quebec =

Coordinates: 50°9′29″N 66°29′13″W

- Sector
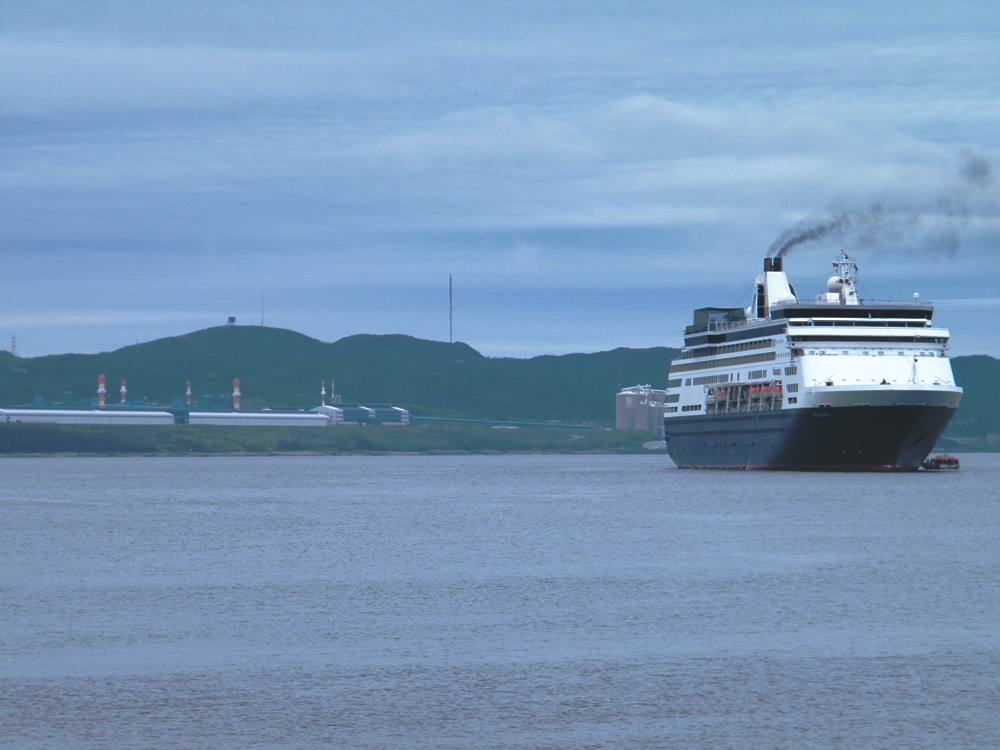
- Alouette smelter and MS Maasdam in the harbour
- Interactive map of Pointe-Noire, Quebec

Pointe-Noire (French pronunciation: [pwɛ̃t nwaʁ]) is a peninsula and an industrial area in the city of Sept-Îles in the Sept-Rivières regional county municipality and the Côte-Nord region in the Canadian province of Quebec.

Used as a deep-sea port throughout the twentieth century, the sector is now a metallurgical complex and transportation hub.

== Etymology ==
The area takes its name from a headland jutting out into Baie des Sept-Îles, transl. Seven Islands Bay. Pointe-Noire was first marked on a map by Gustave Rinfret in 1913.

== Geography ==
Pointe-Noire is located on the Marconi Peninsula, which forms the southern boundary of Baie des Sept Îles, an inlet of the Gulf of St. Lawrence. The headland lies between Portage Sainte-Marguerite Cove and Brochu Cove.

Taking advantage of the natural harbour formed by the Baie des Sept Îles, an industrial and port complex focused on metallurgy has been developed on the headland itself. Iron ore transported from the mines in the Labrador Trough is refined there before being loaded onto ships bound for steelworks. Furthermore, the Alouette aluminium smelter, the largest in the Americas, is located at Pointe-Noire, at the eastern tip of the Marconi Peninsula.

== History ==
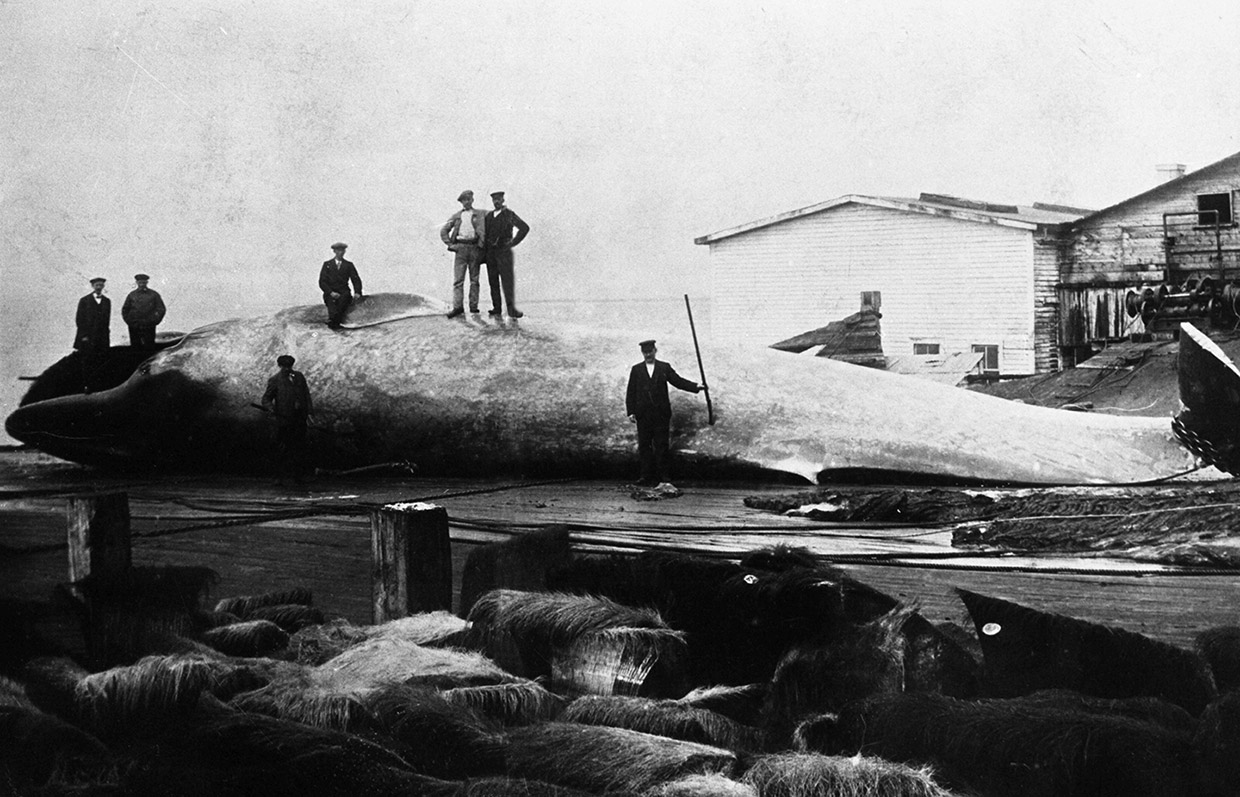
Whale oil production in Pointe-Noire around 1910

From 1905 to 1913, the Norwegian company Steam Whaling operated a whale oil factory in Pointe-Noire.

A wharf is also built in 1908 by James and William Clarke for their mill in Clarke City. They also built the first rail line in the region, linking Pointe-Noire with the mill.

Along with the development of mining in the central Labrador peninsula, an iron ore pelletising plant and a port terminal were built in 1961. A new railroad, Chemin de fer Arnaud, was built by Wabush Mines between Pointe-Noire and Sept-Îles. The plant was inaugurated in the summer of 1965; Pointe-Noire then became a major port and industrial area of the Côte-Nord. In 1989, the plant employed 358 workers.

In 1970, a bill is passed to annex Pointe-Noire to the city of Sept-Îles, thus allowing the local government to collect taxes on the Wabush Mines terminal.

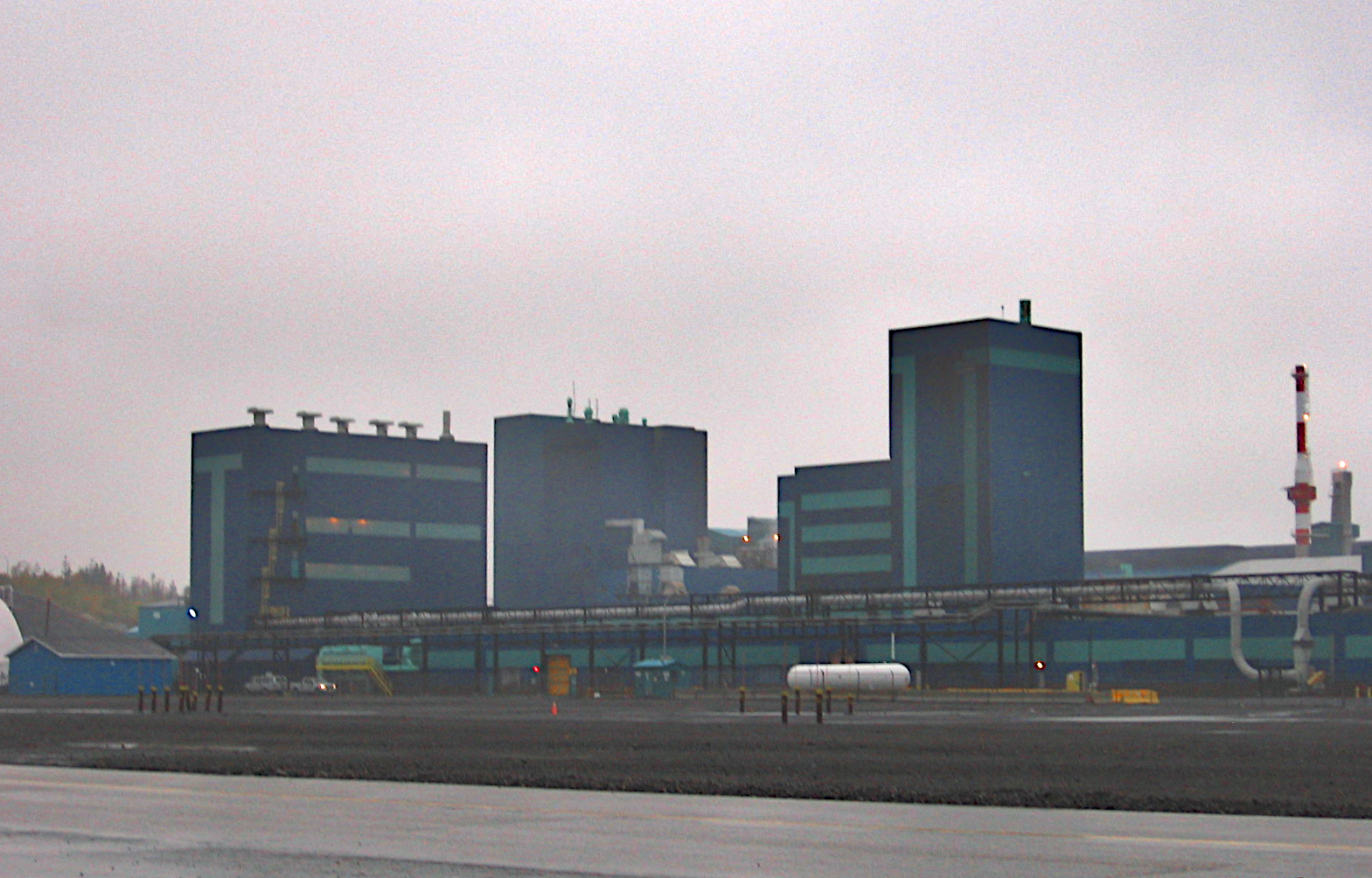
Alouette aluminium smelter in Pointe-Noire

Work began in 1989 by a series of partners to build an aluminium smelter : Société générale de financement, Kobe Steel, Mitsubishi, YKK, as well as Austrian, German and Swiss interests. The opening of the 1,000-worker Aluminerie Alouette three years later, against the backdrop of a slump in the iron markets, helped fuelling the metallurgy-oriented economy of the region.

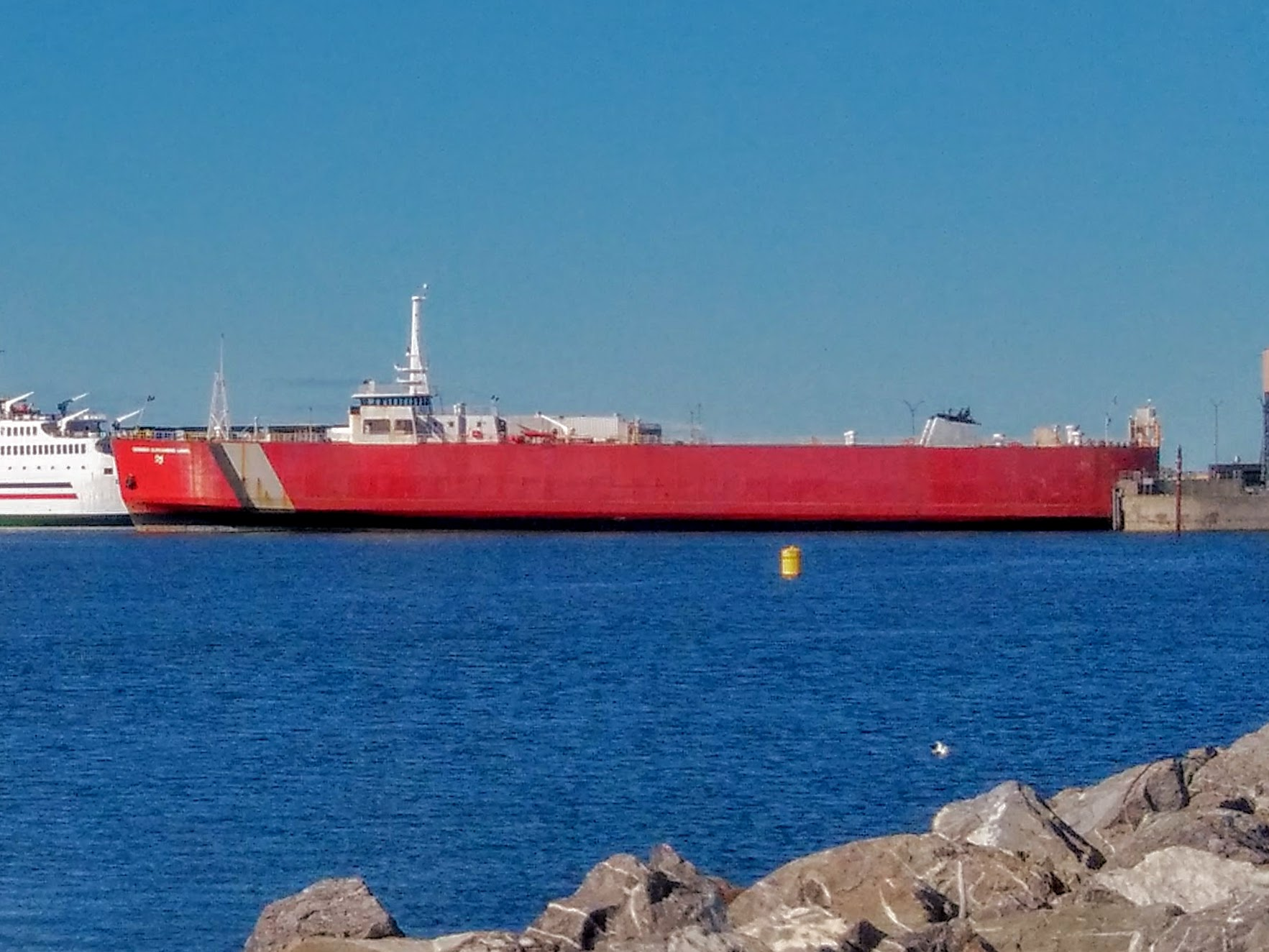
The Compagnie de gestion de Matane operates a railcar ferry service between Matane and Pointe-Noire

== Transportation ==
Pointe-Noire is the site of three terminals for the Port of Sept-Îles, although located 28 kilometres away from the other facilities, across the bay. The Multi-user terminal is the first Chinamax-compatible berth in North America.

The terminals are served by the Chemin de fer Arnaud, a 38-kilometre shortline connecting Pointe-Noire to the Quebec North Shore and Labrador Railway, which carries the iron ore trains from the Labrador Trough to the coast.

A weekly railcar ferry service across the Gulf of St. Lawrence between Pointe-Noire and Matane, operated by a subsidiary of Canadian National, connects the North Shore rail lines to the North American network.
