= Bloom Lake Railway =

Railway line in Canada

Overview
- Headquarters: Wabush, Newfoundland and Labrador
- Reporting mark: WLRS
- Locale: Bloom Lake Mine to WBR junction
- Dates of operation: 2010–

Technical
- Track gauge: 4 ft 8 1/2 in (1,435 mm) standard gauge

The Bloom Lake Railway (reporting mark WLRS) (formerly BLRC) is a privately owned Canadian short line railway operating in the province of Newfoundland and Labrador and Quebec.

The project was commissioned for Consolidated Thompson Iron Mines to connect their new Bloom Lake mine (opened in 2010) near Fermont, Quebec with the existing Wabush Lake Railway in Wabush, Newfoundland and Labrador. The 36 km (22 mi) Bloom Lake Railway was constructed between 2006 and 2010. All of the railway, except the first 2 km (1.2 mi), are located in Labrador.

Iron ore concentrate is transported by Bloom Lake Railway to Wabush, then on the Wabush Lake Railway to Labrador City, Newfoundland and Labrador. At Labrador City, the iron ore concentrate is interchanged to the Quebec, North Shore and Labrador Railway for the journey south to the shipping port in Sept-Îles, Quebec. A total of 740 rail cars were purchased for the line.

In 2011, Genesee & Wyoming began control of operations on behalf of the owners under the name Western Labrador Rail Services. The new operation encompasses the ARND, Bloom Lake Railway, and WABL.
