= Knob Lake and Timmins Railway =

Overview
- Headquarters: Trois-Rivières, Quebec
- Reporting mark: KLT
- Locale: Schefferville, Quebec
- Dates of operation: 2015–present

Technical
- Length: 13 mi (21 km)

The Knob Lake and Timmins Railway is an industrial railway owned by Genesee & Wyoming. It provides rail services between Schefferville, Quebec, and iron mines located approximately 13 mi (21 km) to the northwest, straddling the border between Quebec and Labrador. It interchanges with Tshiuetin Rail Transportation in Schefferville.
