= Wabush Lake Railway =

Shortline railway line in Canada

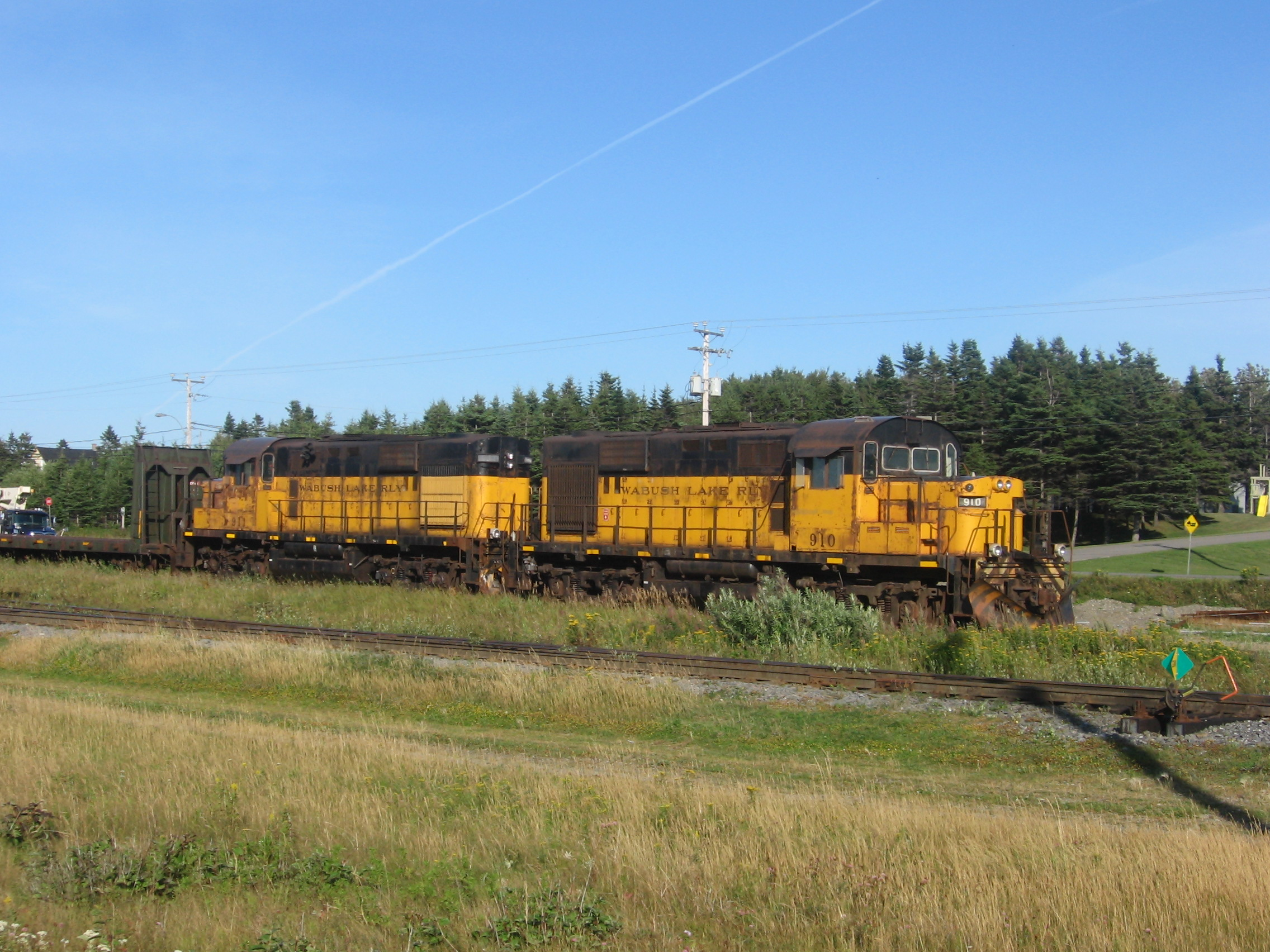
- Two MLW RS-18s pull a freight train in 2013

Overview
- Headquarters: Wabush, Newfoundland and Labrador
- Reporting mark: WLRS
- Locale: Labrador, Canada
- Dates of operation: 1963–

Technical
- Track gauge: 4 ft 8 1/2 in (1,435 mm)

The Wabush Lake Railway (reporting mark WLRS) (formerly WABL and NLCL) is a short line railway operating in the province of Newfoundland and Labrador, Canada.

The railway was built in 1960 from the Quebec North Shore and Labrador Railway to Wabush, initially called the Northern Lands Company Railway (reporting mark: NLC).

Opened in 1963, the railway operates a line running between Labrador City, Labrador, and Wabush, where it interchanges with the Quebec North Shore and Labrador Railway.

The Wabush Lake Railway is owned by the Wabush Mining Company, which mines iron ore near Labrador City. The ore is transported from the mine to the Quebec North Shore and Labrador Railway connection at Wabush. The Quebec North Shore and Labrador Railway transports the ore between Wabush and Arnaud Junction, Quebec using Wabush locomotives, currently a mix of power leased from CEFX and QNS&L. At Arnaud Junction, the ore is transferred to Wabush Lake Railway's sister company, Chemin de fer Arnaud (Arnaud Railway), for the final journey to ship loading facilities at nearby Pointe-Noire, Quebec.

In 2010, Consolidated Thompson Iron Mines opened the Bloom Lake Mine, just west of Labrador City, Newfoundland, and the Bloom Lake Railway to transport iron ore from the mine to a connection with the Wabush Lake Railway. The Wabush Lake Railway began acting as a middleman, taking the Bloom Lake Railway trains, and transporting them to Wabush Junction for the Quebec North Shore and Labrador Railway (QNS&L) to transport to the Chemin de fer Arnaud just as they would Wabush trains. The Arnaud then takes the trains to Consolidated Thompson's dock at Pointe-Noire, Quebec. Consolidated Thompson has since been purchased by Cliffs Natural Resources.

In 2011, Genesee & Wyoming assumed control of operations on behalf of the owners under the name WLRS. The new operation encompasses the Arnaud Railway, Bloom Lake Railway, and Wabush Lake Railway.

This railway (along with the Arnaud Railway, Bloom Lake Railway, QNSX, and Tshiuetin Rail Transportation line) forms an isolated railroad network, as it does not interchange with any other rail lines on the North American network.
