= Wheatland Rail =

Wheatland Railway Inc.
Overview
- Headquarters: Cudworth, Saskatchewan
- Locale: Saskatchewan
- Dates of operation: 2002–

Technical
- Track gauge: 4 ft 8 1/2 in (1,435 mm) standard gauge

The Wheatland Railway Inc. is a Canadian short line railway company operating on trackage in Saskatchewan, Canada. Wheatland Rail is owned by six north central Saskatchewan municipalities. The railway leases former Canadian National Railway tracks. The Wheatland Railway utilizes its own train crews and locomotives.

The SRCL network consists of 74 km (46 mi) of its own trackage.
