= Rail transport operations =

Railway rolling stock and infrastructure

Rail transport operations are the day-to-day operations of a railway. A railway has two major components: the infrastructure (the permanent way, tracks, stations, freight facilities, viaducts, tunnels, etc.) and the rolling stock (the passenger coaches, locomotives, freight cars, etc.)

Ownership and operation of these two components varies by location. In some places (notably, most of North America) private railway companies own and operate both the infrastructure and rolling stock (for example, Union Pacific). In the United Kingdom, the infrastructure is owned and maintained by Network Rail while rolling stock is largely owned and operated by private railway companies. In countries with nationalized rail systems such as China and France, both the infrastructure and rolling stock are owned and operated directly or indirectly by the national government.

== Operation ==
The operation of the railway is through a system of control, originally by mechanical means, but nowadays more usually electronic and computerized.

== Intrinsic factors ==
=== Signalling ===
Signalling systems used to control the movement of traffic may be either of fixed block or moving block variety.

==== Fixed block signalling ====
Most blocks are 'fixed' blocks, i.e. they delineate a section of track between two defined points. On timetable, train order, and token-based systems, blocks usually start and end at selected stations. On signalling-based systems, blocks usually start and end at signals. Alternatively, cab signalling may be in use.

The lengths of blocks are designed to allow trains to operate as frequently as necessary. A lightly used branch line might have blocks many kilometres long, whilst a busy commuter railway might have blocks a few hundred metres long.

==== Moving block signalling ====
A disadvantage of fixed blocks, is that: the faster trains are permitted to run, the longer the stopping distance, and therefore the longer the blocks need to be. This decreases a line's capacity.

With moving block, computers are used to calculate a 'safe zone', behind each moving train, which no other train may enter. The system depends on precise knowledge of where each train is and how fast it is moving. With moving block, lineside signals are not provided, and instructions are passed directly to the trains. It has the advantage of increasing track capacity by allowing trains to run much closer together. The system is only used on very few independent networks such as underground lines.

=== Types of rail system ===
Most rail systems serve a number of functions on the same track, carrying local, long-distance and commuter passenger trains, and freight trains. The emphasis on each varies by country. Some urban rail transit, rapid transit and light rail systems are isolated from the national system in the cities they serve. Some freight lines serving mines are also isolated, and these are usually owned by the mine company. An industrial railway is a specialized rail system used inside factories or mines. Steep grade railways are usually isolated, with special safety systems.

=== Permanent way and railroad construction ===
The permanent way trails through the physical geography. The tracks' geometry is limited by the physical geography.

=== Types of vehicle ===
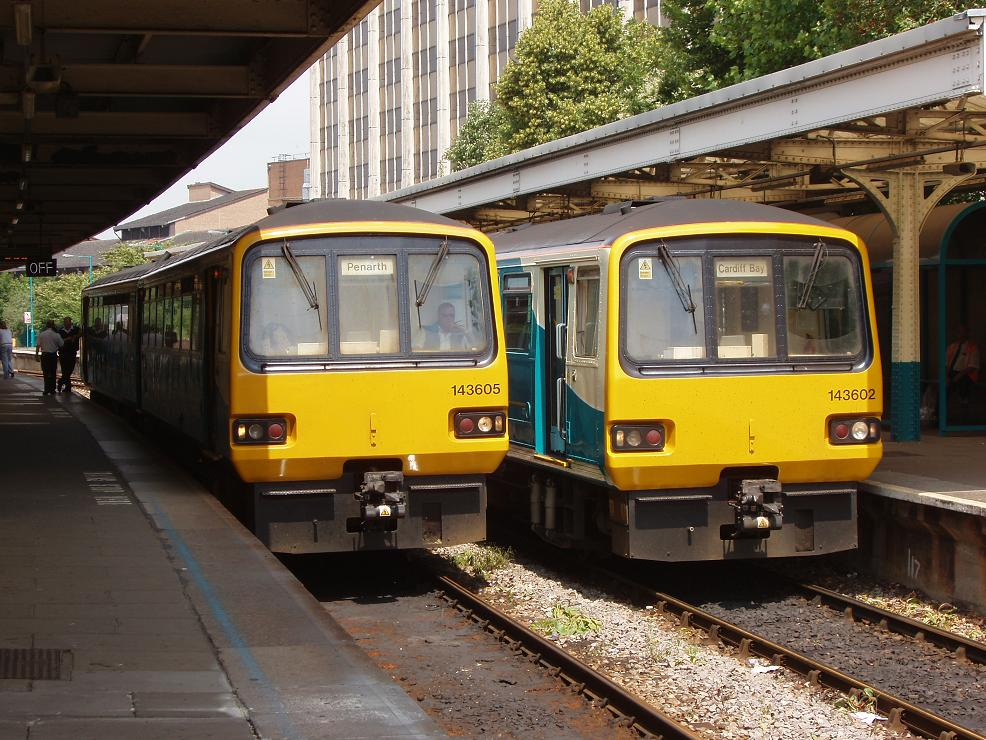
Two British Rail Class 143 DMUs at Cardiff Queen Street station in the United Kingdom. Both trains were operated by Arriva Trains Wales but are now operated by Transport for Wales Rail.

Trains are pushed/pulled by one or more locomotive units. Two or more locomotives coupled in multiple traction are frequently used in freight trains. Railroad cars or rolling stock consist of passenger cars, freight cars, maintenance cars and in America cabooses. Modern passenger trains sometimes are pushed/pulled by a tail and head unit (see top and tail), of which not both need to be motorised or running. Many passenger trains consist of multiple units with motors mounted beneath the passenger cars.

=== Passenger operations ===
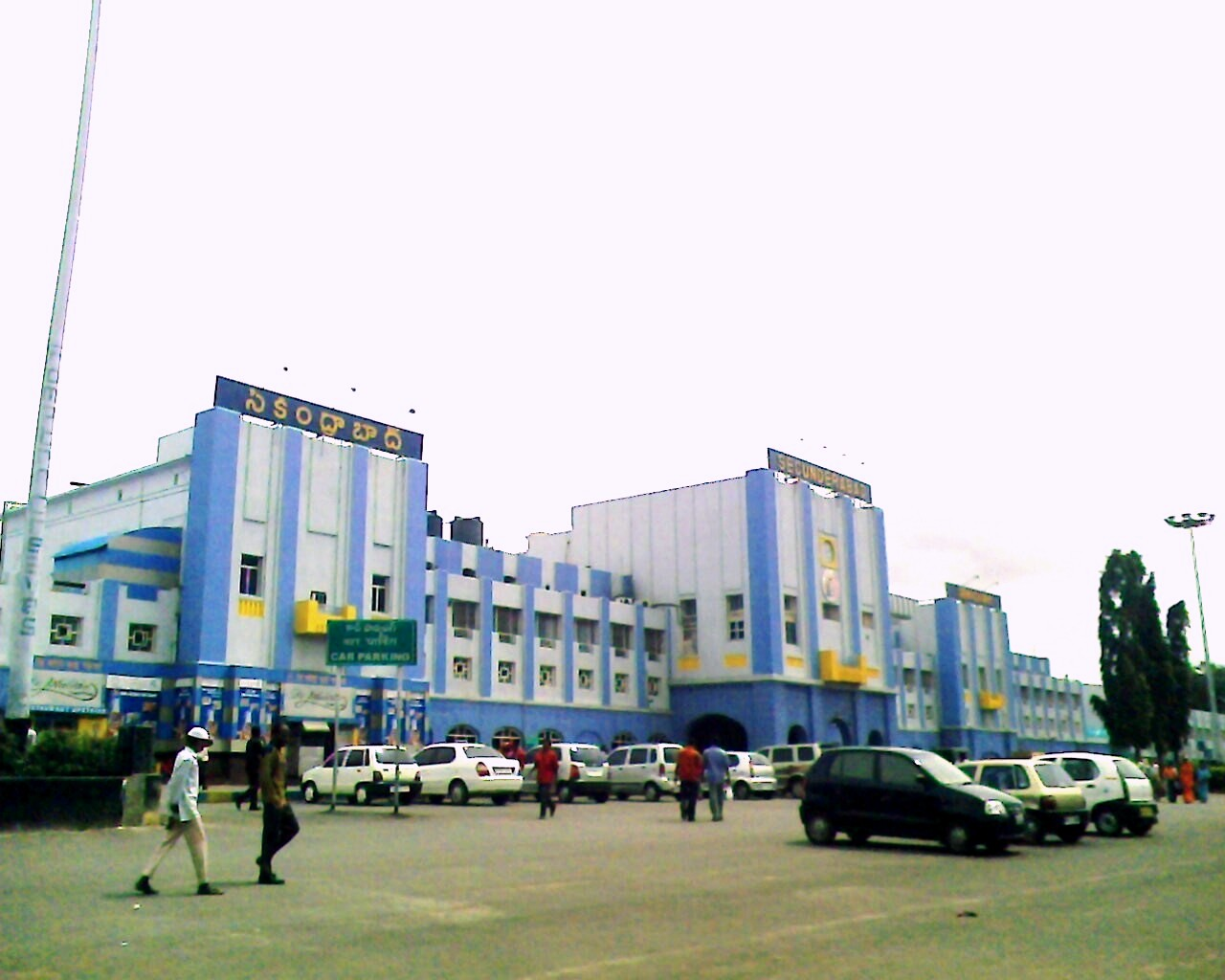
The Secunderabad Railway Station is one of the busiest stations of Indian Railways

Most public transport passenger operations happen in the train station and in the passenger car. The passenger buys a ticket, either in the station, or on the train (sometimes at a higher fare).

There are generally speaking two ways of validating a ticket:

- the passengers validate the tickets themselves (by perforating it, for instance) which is randomly checked by a ticket controller. This method is sometimes referred to as Proof-of-payment and is used extensively on one-man operated rail and bus lines, and may be controlled through the use of ticket barriers at entrances, especially in larger stations, or
- a conductor checks all persons on the train for valid tickets and devaluate them, so they cannot be used again.

Some passenger cars, especially in long-distance high-speed trains, have a restaurant or bar. These need to be catered. In recent times, train catering has been diminished somewhat by vending machines in the train station or on the train.

When not in use, passenger cars are stored, maintained and repaired in coach yards.

=== Freight operations ===
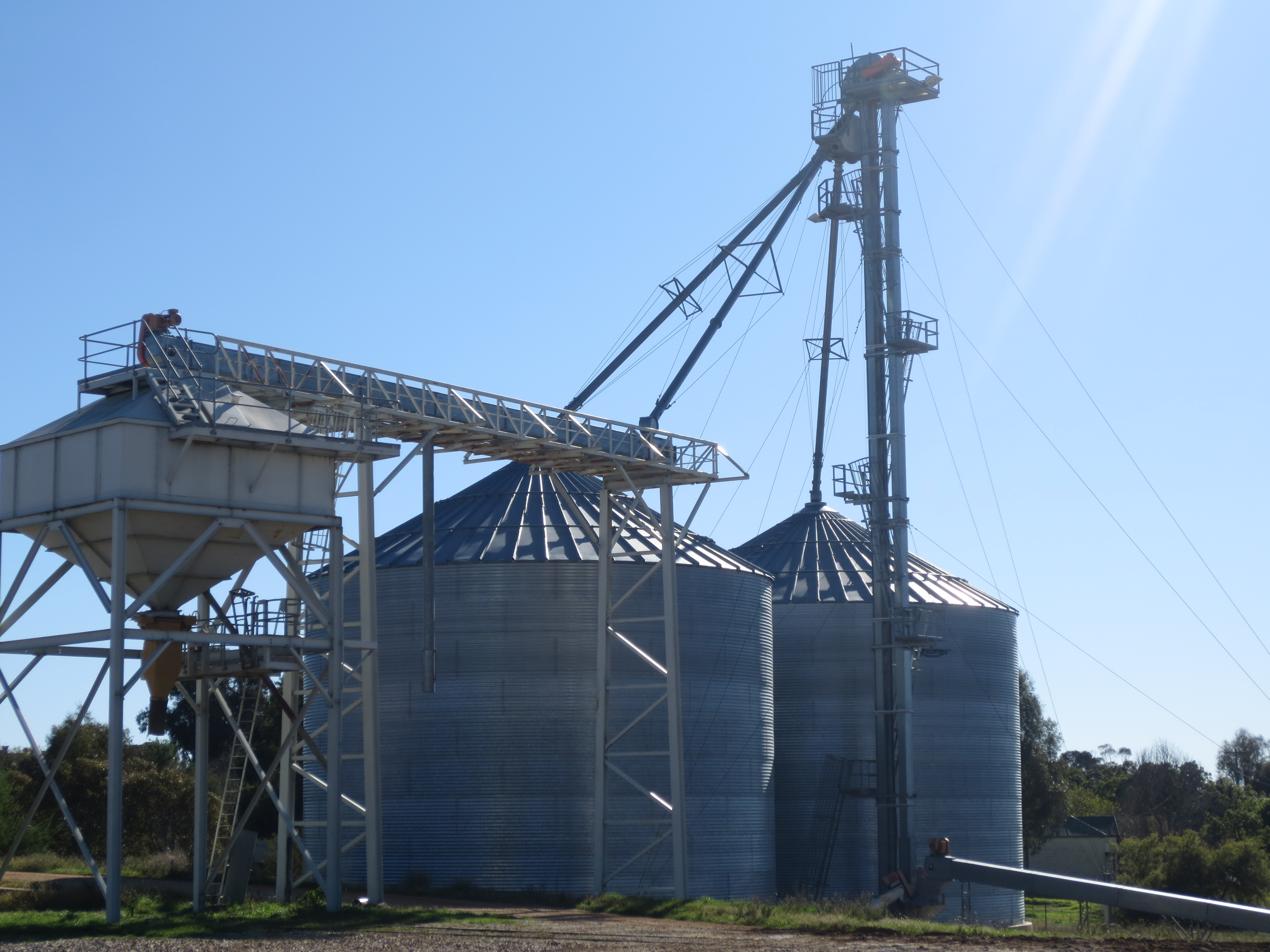
Small grain silos in railyard - truck and train loading/unloading (rail transfer left side foreground now not in use by trains)(2016)

Freight or cargo trains are loaded and unloaded in intermodal terminals (also called container freight stations or freight terminals), and at customer locations (e.g. mines, grain elevators, factories). Intermodal freight transport uses standardized containers, which are handled by cranes. Along their routes, freight trains are routed through rail yards to sort cars and assemble trains for their final destinations, as well as for equipment maintenance, refueling, and crew changes. Within a freight yard, trains are composed in a classification yard. Switcher or shunter locomotives help the composing.

A unit train (also called a block train), which carries a block of cars all of the same origin and destination, does not get sorted in a classification yard, but may stop in a freight yard for inspection, engine servicing and/or crew changes.

Combining freight and passenger operations on a single track with passing loops poses operational problems, because of the different demands of freight operators and public transport. In many smaller countries passenger operations are done during the day, while freight trains operate mostly during the night. Dedicated tracks have been assigned to some operations.

=== Locomotive operations ===
Inactive locomotives may be housed in a locomotive depot (UK term) or engine house, also known as an engine shed or roundhouse (US). In engine facilities, or a traction maintenance depot, locomotives are cleaned, inspected for wear, repaired, updated, or otherwise improved. Decommissioned locomotives with steam generation capacities were sometimes positioned in semi-permanent locations and their boiler capacity was used to provide steam to heat facilities, power machinery, warm passenger cars, or snow and ice clearing activities such as defrosting railroad switches in cold weather conditions.

Railroad equipment that is considered obsolete by being outdated or inefficient when compared to newer equipment, or by being worn to a point that is un-repairable, may be taken out of railroad service. These pieces of equipment may have usable parts removed by the railroad company for reuse on other machines, or may be sold as complete units for reconditioning and reuse by another user. If the equipment is considered completely un-serviceable, and it is financially unwise to attempt to make it so, the entire machine may be declared scrap and is usually sold to be taken away and dismantled for recycling of the raw materials. If the process of salvage or scrapping is financially unrecoverable, the equipment may be left in place until it becomes possible to do so. In some cases a significant or desirable piece of equipment will be purchased for preservation. There units may be placed in railway museums or may be purchased by railway preservation groups or private collectors.

Steam locomotives were frequently housed in a circular train depot, known as a roundhouse that surrounded a turntable.

=== Maintenance of way operations ===
The presence of a work train on a given section of track will temporarily decrease the capacity of the route. The normal method in such operations is to cease other traffic altogether during the track 'occupation'. Services may be diverted by an alternative route, if available; alternatively, passenger services may be maintained using a replacement bus service. It is therefore more economically viable to plan such track occupations for periods of reduced usage (e.g. 'off-peak', overnight or holiday times) to minimise the impact on normal services and revenue.

== Background factors (feasibility) ==
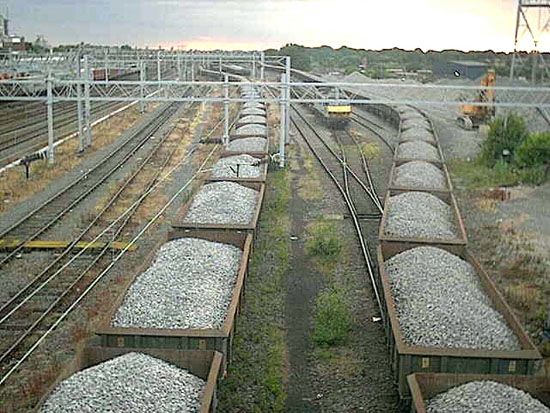
Freight wagons await unloading in the United Kingdom

Each transport system represents a contribution to a country's infrastructure, and as such must make economic sense or eventually close. From this, each has a particular role or roles. These may change with time but they affect the specifications of each particular system.

== Extrinsic factors ==
Rail transport systems are built into the landscape, including both the physical geography (hills, valleys, etc.) and the human geography (location of settlements). The rail transport system may in turn feedback into the human geography.

=== Physical geography ===
The permanent way of a system must pass through the geography and geology of its region. This may be flat or mountainous, may include obstacles such as water and mountains. These determine, in part, the intrinsic nature of the system. The slope at which trains run must also be calculated correctly. In this stage, it is decided where tunnels pass.

=== Human geography ===
Rail transport systems affect the human geography. Large cities (such as Nairobi) may be founded by a railroad passing through. Historically, when a station has been built outside the town or city it is intended to serve, that town has expanded to include the station, or buildings (especially Inns) sprung up near the station. The existence of a station may increase the number of commuters who live in a town or village and so cause it to become a dormitory town. The transcontinental railroad was a large factor in American colonization of the Western frontier. China's railroad expansion into Tibet may have similar consequences.

=== Historical factors ===
Rail transport systems are often used for purposes they were not designed for, but have evolved into due to changes in human geography. Politics can play a large part in decisions about railways, such as the Beeching Axe. In the UK, building or rebuilding a railway usually requires an Act of Parliament. In many countries, rail subsidies allow unprofitable, but socially desirable, railways to continue to operate.
