= Chemin de fer Arnaud =

Canadian private short line railway

Overview
- Headquarters: Pointe-Noire
- Reporting mark: CFAQ
- Locale: eastern Quebec
- Dates of operation: 1965–

Technical
- Track gauge: 4 ft 8 1/2 in (1,435 mm) standard gauge

The Chemin de fer Arnaud, now Chemin de fer Arnaud Quebec (reporting mark CFAQ) (formerly ARND and CFA) (in English, the Arnaud Railway) is a private Canadian short line railway owned by Société ferroviaire et portuaire de Pointe-Noire (SFPPN) operating in the province of Quebec.

Opened in 1965 by the Wabush Mining Company, which mines iron ore in Wabush, NL, the railway operates a line running around Sept-Îles Harbour from Arnaud Junction, on the Quebec North Shore and Labrador Railway to ship loading facilities at Pointe-Noire.

The ore is transported from the mine to a connection with QNSL at Wabush, NL by Arnaud's sister railway, the Wabush Lake Railway. QNSL transports the ore between Wabush, NL and Arnaud Jct., QC. At Arnaud Jct., the ore is transferred to Chemin de fer Arnaud for the final journey to Pointe-Noire, Quebec.

In 2011, Genesee & Wyoming began control of Northern operations on behalf of the owners under the name Western Labrador Rail Services. The new operation encompasses the Bloom Lake Railway and Wabush Lake Railway only. Arnaud Railway (Pointe-Noire operations) is operated by Société ferroviaire et portuaire de Pointe-Noire (SFPPN).

Currently, this railway (along with the TSH line, QNSX, and WABL) form an isolated railroad network, as it does not directly interchange with any other rail lines on the North American network at this time, aside from rail ferry service via COGEMA to the CN Rail port at Matane, Quebec.

== See also ==
- COGEMA
