= Quebec North Shore and Labrador Railway =

Canadian regional railway

Overview
- Headquarters: Sept-Îles, Quebec
- Reporting mark: QNSL
- Locale: Labrador / Quebec
- Dates of operation: 1954–present

Technical
- Track gauge: 1,435 mm (4 ft 8 1/2 in) standard gauge

Other
- Website: www.qnsl.ca

The Quebec North Shore and Labrador Railway is a private Canadian regional railway that stretches 414 kilometres (257 mi) through the wilderness of northeastern Quebec and western Labrador. It connects Labrador City, Labrador, with the port of Sept-Îles, Quebec, on the north shore of the St. Lawrence River. QNS&L is owned by Iron Ore Company of Canada (IOC), and is a common carrier.

== History ==
When it was built between 1951 and 1954, the QNS&L connected the port of Sept-Îles on the north shore of the St. Lawrence River with the northern terminus at IOC's mining community of Schefferville, Quebec, a distance of 359 miles (578 km). In 1958, the Wabush ore body near Labrador City was opened by IOC and the Wabush Mining Company. QNS&L built a 36-mile (58 km) line to serve these mines, running west from the Sept-Îles-Schefferville main line at Emeril Junction, Labrador, to Carol Lake, Labrador, near Wabush. Service on this branch began in 1960.

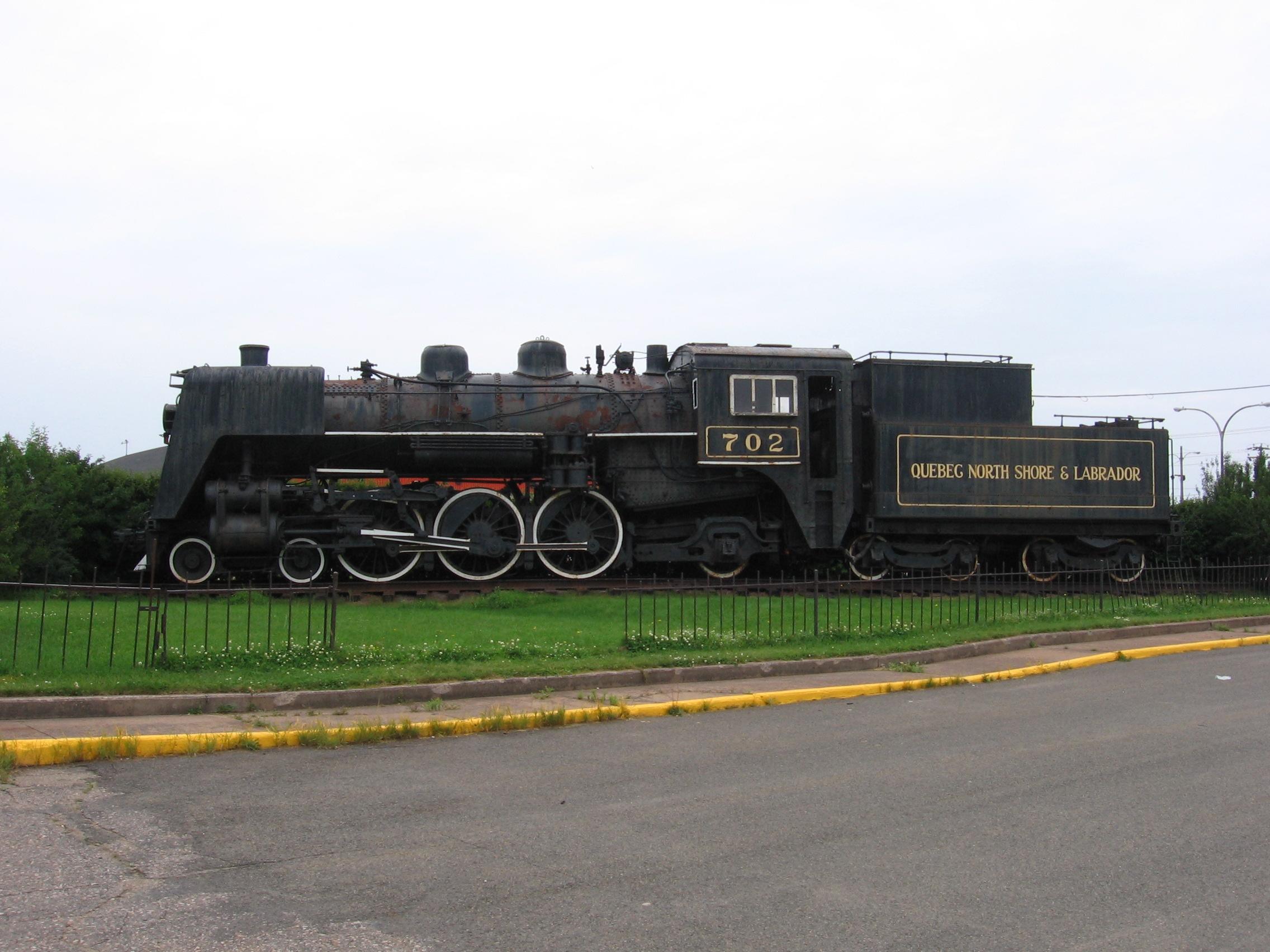
QNS&L 4-6-2 #702 preserved at Sept-Îles, Quebec. This 1921 CLC engine initially worked on the Temiskaming & Northern Ontario before being purchased by the QSN&L in 1953 to help with steam heating and construction of the line.

At the same time, Wabush Mining Company built the relatively short Wabush Lake Railway from its mines at Labrador City to the QNS&L connection at Wabush. QNS&L hauls its own traffic from Carol Lake to IOC port facilities at Sept-Îles. QNSX also hauls Wabush Lake Railway traffic from the interchange at Wabush to Arnaud Jct., Quebec, near Sept-Îles, where it interchanges to the Arnaud Railway, which then completes the journey around Sept-Îles Harbour to Wabush Mining Co. port facilities at Pointe Noire, Quebec.

In the 1980s, the Schefferville mining operations were closed in favour of iron ore deposits located further to the south near Wabush, and most residents relocated to Labrador City. QNS&L maintained subsidized passenger and freight service for local First Nations communities along this portion of its system, known as the Menihek Subdivision, until December 1, 2005, when it sold the Emeril Junction-Schefferville rail line to Tshiuetin Rail Transportation (TSH) for the sum of $1 CAD. QNS&L still provides freight services, transporting employee automobiles, various bulk mine materials, large equipment, and everyday supplies for Labrador City and the various maintenance of way camps.

This railway, along with the TSH line, Chemin de fer Arnaud (ARND), Wabush Lake Railway (WABL), and Bloom Lake Railway (BLRC), form an isolated railway network, as it does not interchange with any other rail lines on the North American network.

== Incidents ==
Some time after 1997, the QNS&L was permitted by Transport Canada to employ only one engineer on its routes. In 2013 after the Lac-Mégantic rail disaster, Transport Canada issued 12 guideline regulations. Since August 20, 2013 the QNS&L has been the only remaining freight railway in Canada to use Single Person Train Operation (SPTO). (Note: The one other Single Person Train Operation freight carrier, Montreal, Maine and Atlantic Railway, was shut down by Canadian authorities in 2013.)

On Thursday, November 6, 2014, a freight train consisting of three locomotives and 240 railcars derailed 20 km north of Sept-Îles, because of a landslide over the rail tracks. The locomotives and several railcars ended up in the Moisie River. The engineer of the locomotive died and was found by divers two days later.

== More traffic ==
In 2010, Consolidated Thompson Iron Mines opened the Bloom Lake Mine, just west of Labrador City, Newfoundland. As part of this new operation, Genesee & Wyoming was contracted to operate the Bloom Lake Railway to transport iron ore from the mine to a connection with the Wabush Lake Railway. The Wabush Lake Railway began acting as a middle man, taking the Bloom Lake Railway trains, and transporting them to Wabush Junction for the QNS&L to transport to the Chemin de fer Arnaud just as they would Wabush trains. The Arnaud then takes the trains to the Consolidated Thompson's dock at Pointe-Noire, Quebec.

== In popular culture ==
The construction of the QNSX forms the backdrop for English author Hammond Innes' 1958 adventure novel about Labrador, The Land God Gave to Cain. Innes spent a period of time with the crews building the railway during his research.

On his 1960 album, Canada's Story in Song, Alan Mills featured a song called "Iron Ore by 'Fifty-Four", in which he sang of the story of the construction of the railroad.

In the early 1970s, a country-Western band from Newfoundland called the Newfoundland Showband recorded a song about the railway, sung to the tune of "Wabash Cannonball".

== Locomotive roster ==
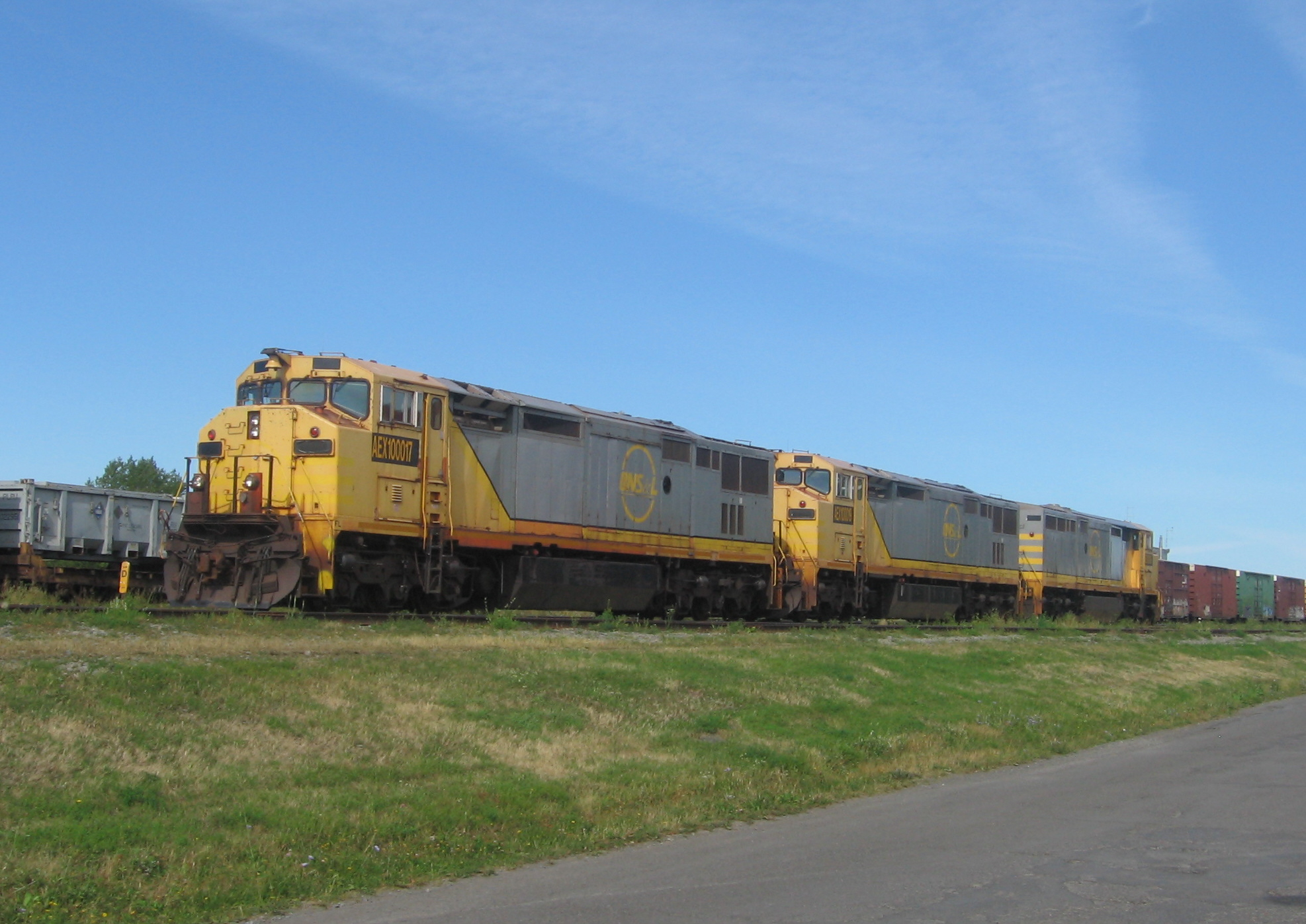
Three GE C40-8M diesel locomotives. Note the AEX reporting marks as the units were sold for scrap in 2016.

QNSL rosters seven types of locomotives. Most of these engines have been rebuilt at some point in their lives, but there some that are where wrecked and retired.

Model	Maker	Numbers	Date Built	Remarks
SD40-3	EMD	310–316	1972–1973	Rebuilt from SD40-2s by Metro East Industries in 1994. Rebuilt again by National Railway Equipment 2014-2024.
SD40-2CLC	EMD	317-322	1972–1973	Rebuilt from SD40-2s in 1995. In storage.
C44-9W	GE	404–414	1998	
AC4400CW	GE	415–426	2006	
AC44C6M	GE	430–443	1998 (original), 2021–2022 (rebuild)	Rebuilt from ex-BNSF C44-9Ws by Wabtec in 2021-2022.
SD70ACe	EMD	501–528	2003–04, 2009, 2011–12	524-528 are ex-BHP
GP38-M	EMD	9501–9503	1967	Rebuilt from GP38s by MotivePower.

== Locomotives ==
QNS&L uses the SD40-3s mainly on mixed freight and work trains. The newer C44-9Ws, AC4400CWs, and SD70ACes handle the unit iron ore trains.

== See also ==
- COGEMA
- GMD SW1200MG
