= Investissement Québec =

Canadian investment company

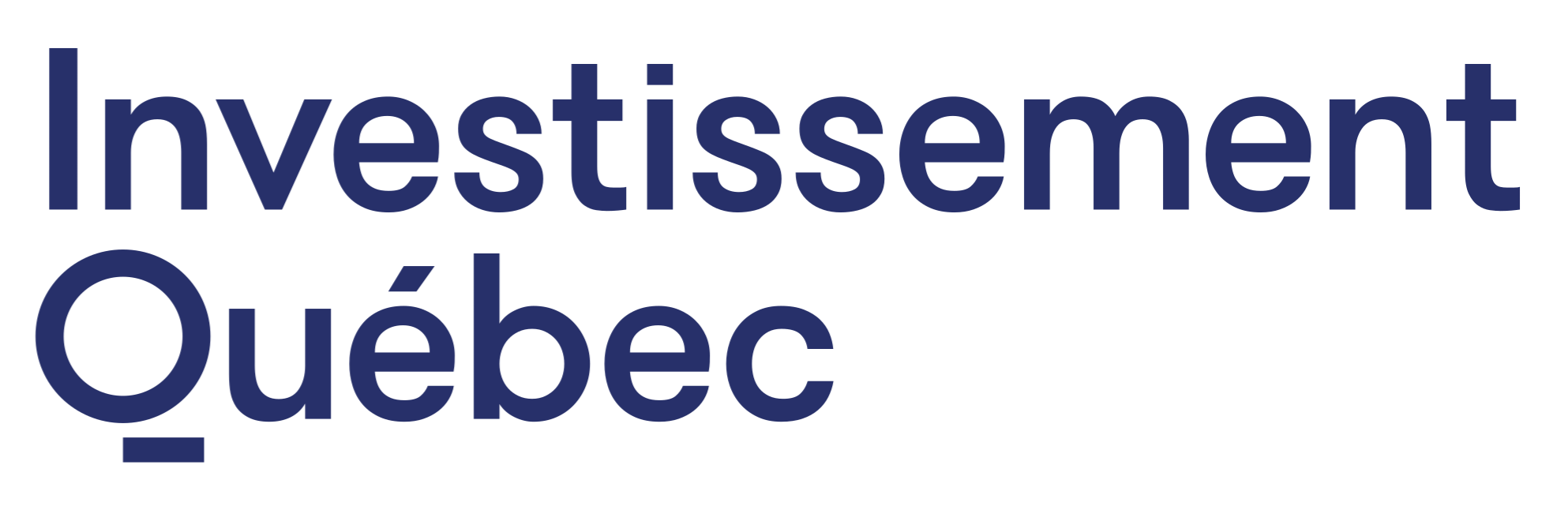
- Founded: 1998
- Number of employees: 1,296 (2024)

Investissement Québec (French pronunciation: [ɛ̃vɛstismɑ̃ kebɛk]) is a company established in 1998 under an act passed by the National Assembly of Quebec to favour investment in Quebec by Quebec-based and international companies. Its registered office is located in Quebec City. In December 2010 it took over the Société générale de financement.

Investissement Québec initially held a 19% stake in the Airbus A220 (formerly Bombardier CSeries) programme. This was increased to 25% in February 2020, at no cash cost to Investissement Québec, as part of a deal that saw Bombardier sell its share to Airbus.

== Société générale de financement ==
Société générale de financement
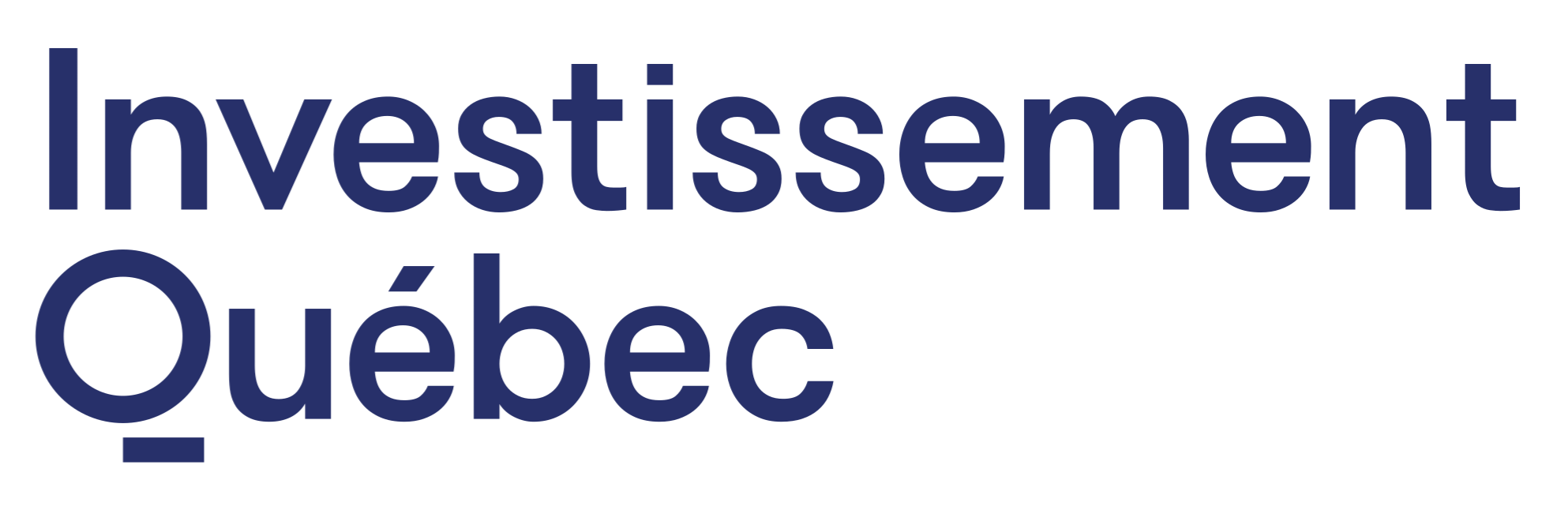
- Company type: Provincially owned holding company
- Founded: 1962
- Headquarters: Montreal, Quebec, Canada
- Products: financial investment
- Owner: Government of Quebec
- Number of employees: 1,296 (2024)

The Société générale de financement (SGF) was a holding company owned by the Government of Quebec. Its mission was to attract investment to Quebec by investing in other companies. Another mission was to promote new small businesses. In December 2010, Bill 123 that planned the merger of the SGF into Investissement Québec received royal assent. The SGF ceased activities on 31 March 2011.

== Investments ==
=== Airbus Canada ===
In July 2016, Investissement Québec took a stake in C Series Aircraft Limited Partnership (CSALP), a joint venture with Bombardier Aerospace to develop its CSeries aircraft. In October 2017, Airbus and Bombardier announced that Airbus would acquire a 50.01% majority stake in CSALP, with Bombardier keeping 31% and Investissement Québec 19%. This deal closed in July 2018, and the aircraft was rebranded as the Airbus A220. Bombardier exited the A220 programme in February 2020, selling its share to Airbus; Investissement Québec kept a 25% share. In February 2022, a further $1.2b investment in Airbus Canada was agreed ($900m from Airbus, $300m from Investissement Québec) to support an acceleration of the A220's production rate.

=== Flying Whales ===
In 2019, Investissement Québec acquired a stake in Flying Whales, a start-up specializing in the construction and operation of rigid-structure airships. The state-owned company holds 24.99% of Flying Whales SAS, which corresponds to 15 million euros. An additional 5 million euros are planned for the Canadian subsidiary, bringing the total investment to 30 million Canadian dollars (20 million euros). Future aerostats are intended for transporting heavy or indivisible loads and could serve the northern regions of Quebec.

In Ottawa in July 2020, the Ministry of Innovation, Science and Industry has not yet given its operating authorization to the Quebec subsidiary. The investment in the start-up, arouses controversy. The usual examination procedure seems to be lengthening. The federal government (Ottawa) would wonder about the risk of industrial espionage or the loss of intellectual property due to the presence of the "Chinese state-owned company AVIC" in the shareholding of Flying Whales SAS (with 24.99%). However, this only concerns the Quebec subsidiary (the 5 million euros).
