= Iron Ore Company of Canada =

Canadian mining company

- Type: Private
- Industry: Mining
- Founded: (1949) Wilmington, Delaware, United States
- Headquarters: Montreal, Quebec, Canada
- Key people: Mike McCann, President
- Products: Iron ore
- Revenue: ▲US$2.471 (2011)
- Number of employees: 1,900 (2005)
- Parent: Mitsubishi; Rio Tinto
- Website: www.ironore.ca

Iron Ore Company of Canada (often abbreviated to IOC) (French: Compagnie Minière IOC) is a Canadian-based producer of iron ore. The company was founded in 1949 from a partnership of Canadian and American firms, the largest being the M.A. Hanna Company. It is now owned by a consortium that includes the Mitsubishi and Rio Tinto, the latter being the majority shareholder, with 58.7% of the joint stock as of October 2013. Mitsubishi controlled 26.2% of the investment as of March 2013.

== Operations ==
Based in Montreal, Quebec, IOC currently has open-pit mining and concentrator operations in Labrador City, and operates the Quebec North Shore and Labrador Railway to ship ore concentrate from the mines, such as Wabush, to the port of Sept-Îles, Quebec where it has a furnace and port facilities. The mining operations have a nominal capacity of 55 million tonnes per year. The railway (along with the TSH, CFAQ, and WABL lines) form an isolated railroad network, as it does not interchange with any other rail lines on the North American network.

IOC is amongst the five top producers of seaborne iron ore pellets in the world. The iron ore deposits occur as specular hematite and magnetite, in a 2:1 ratio. The company has mineral reserves of 1.1 billion tonnes and resources of 1.7 billion tonnes. The average grade at mine exit is approximately 38% iron. The company brings to market several products including acid pellets, fluxed pellets, and direct reduction pellets, as well as iron ore concentrate.

=== Milling process ===
The crushed ore iron content is increased in Labrador City from 38% to a two-thirds ratio by a grinding process. A sequence of four wet mills feeds into a gravity spiral plant to increase the grade. The concentrate production capacity is approximately 23.3 million tonnes per year.

=== Pelletizing process ===
The pellet plant converts the concentrate output from the mills into pellets that can be used directly in the blast furnaces of customers. The concentrate is first ground in ball mills and is then formed into balls of diameter 9.5mm to 12.5mm that are dried and then fired in the furnace. The plant has a nominal capacity to produce 12.5 million tonnes per year.

=== Shipping process ===
IOC wholly owns and operates a marine terminal in Sept-Îles. It receives and stockpiles iron ore pellets and concentrate from Labrador City via the QNSL railway. The capacity of the stockpile yard is 20.6 million tonnes per year; at any one time 4.5 million tonnes of iron ore products can be stored.

The shiploading capacity is 20.9 million tonnes per year. Two mobile shiploaders transfer the iron ore product onto the docked freighters. The Sept-Îles terminal operates year-round and can handle ships with a capacity of between 25,000 and 255,000 tonnes.

=== Customers ===
In addition to the Japanese, IOC supplies companies like Salzgitter AG and several German steel works.

== History ==
The IOC's predecessor existed from its birth on the Newfoundland statute book of 1938 as Labrador Mining and Exploration Limited (LM&E), which company was granted extensive exploration and mining rights on the mainland. LM&E discovered the iron ore that now constitutes the mine operated by IOC. LM&E received grants of leases and licences from the dominion under the Statutory Agreement. It also received a grant of surface rights to establish the town site that became Labrador City. LM&E in turn sublet the leasehold to the IOC and IOC built the infrastructure, the mine, the railway and the port. The LM&E has taken various forms over the years and since 2010 exists as the Labrador Iron Ore Royalty Corporation (LIORC). No matter the particular corporate form, its treasury receives a 7% gross overriding royalty on iron ore products produced and sold by IOC.

The IOC was founded in 1949 by a partnership of Canadian and American firms, most notably Hollinger, Labrador Mining, National Republic, Armco, Youngstown and Wheeling-Pittsburg, and the M.A. Hanna Company.

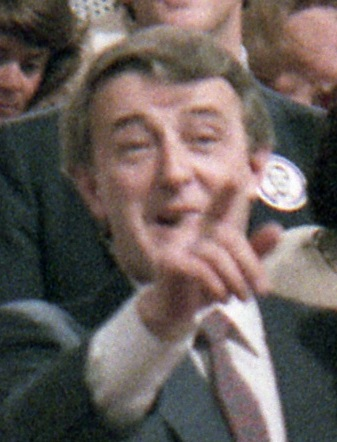
Brian Mulroney in 1983 just after resigning from the presidency of IOC

From 1977 to 1983 the president of the company was Brian Mulroney, who later served as the 18th Prime Minister of Canada from 1984 to 1993.

Rio Tinto PLC acquired the IOC in August 2000, as part of their successful hostile takeover of Australian company North Ltd. In December 2000 they wanted to buy more of the company. The bid failed in April 2001 when only 20% of the LIORIF shares were tendered.

In August 2007 $60 million was invested to increase production at Labrador City, from 17MT to 18.4MT in mid-2008. At the time Sam Walsh was in the driver's seat at Rio Tinto Iron Ore.

On 6 May 2010 Rio Tinto announced that it was investing US$235 million in an expansion program at the IOC.

In June 2010 the Labrador Iron Ore Royalty Income Fund was transformed into the LIORC in a transaction valued at $248 million.

In June 2013 Rio tried to sell its part because it had too much debt. It valued the share at somewhere in excess of $3.5bn.

By 2013 Mitsubishi and Rio Tinto corporations dominated the shareholdings, alongside junior partner LIORC. Rio Tinto is the majority shareholder in the venture, with 58.7% of the joint stock as of October 2013. Mitsubishi controlled 26.2% of the investment as of March 2013. As of March 2023 the consortium remained unchanged. LIORC represents Canadian interests and trades on the TSX. It "holds a 15.10% equity interest in IOC directly and through its wholly-owned subsidiary, Hollinger-Hanna Limited, and receives a 7% gross overriding royalty and a 10 cent per tonne commission on all iron ore products produced, sold and shipped by IOC."

In 2016 the IOC lost a court case against a band of Innu. The court continued the $900 million suit that IOC had attempted to thwart.

In 2017 the IOC had revenues of $1.9 billion.

In August 2018 there were rumours afloat that Rio wanted to list its shares of IOC on the Toronto Stock Exchange; this came shortly after a two-month strike at the Labrador mine.

In August 2021 Mike McCann was appointed President of the company.

As of March 2023 the operations consisted a mine in Labrador, a processing plant in Labrador City, a combined furnace stockpile and port installation in Sept-Iles, Quebec, and a 418 kilometre railway that joins these two last parts.

== Technical development ==
=== Autonomous railway system ===
As of 2019, IOC's Carol Lake mine near Labrador City, Labrador utilizes a small fleet of GMD SW1200MG electric locomotives to haul raw ore from the mine to a processing plant. The short electrified railway is the last remaining electrified cargo railway in Canada.

The cargo trains are unmanned and fully automated, advancing block by block based on the condition of the block of track ahead. The motive power is SW1200 MG single units, each having a single phase AC motor driving the standard EMD traction generator and traction motors. A horn blows every few seconds as a constant warning that the trains are unmanned.
