= Electric locomotive =

Locomotive powered by electricity

Electric locomotive ChS7 (ЧС7) Škoda 82E9 in Dnipro railway station

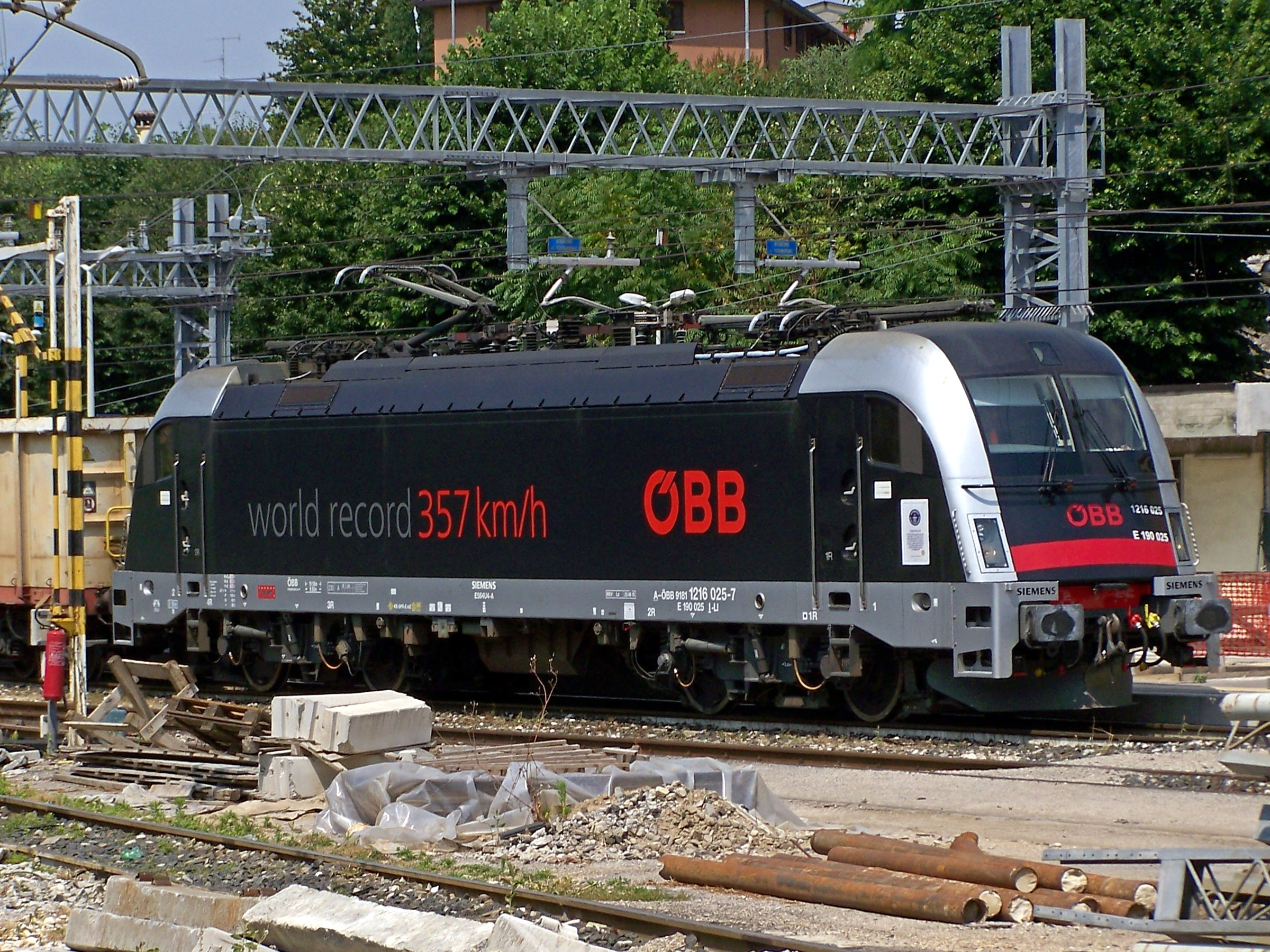
The Siemens ES64U4 is the current confirmed holder as the fastest electric locomotive at 357 km/h (222 mph) in 2006.

The JNR Class EF66 preserved in full condition on display at the Kyoto Railway Museum.

An electric locomotive is a type of locomotive powered by electricity from overhead lines, a third rail or on-board energy storage such as a battery or a supercapacitor. Locomotives with on-board fuelled prime movers, such as diesel engines or gas turbines, are classed as diesel–electric or gas turbine–electric and not as electric locomotives, because the electric generator/motor combination serves only as a power transmission system.

Electric locomotives benefit from the high efficiency of electric motors, often above 90% (not including the inefficiency of generating the electricity). Additional efficiency can be gained from regenerative braking, which allows kinetic energy to be recovered during braking to put power back on the line. Newer electric locomotives use AC motor-inverter drive systems that provide for regenerative braking. Electric locomotives are quiet compared to diesel locomotives since there is no engine and exhaust noise and less mechanical noise. The lack of reciprocating parts means electric locomotives are easier on the track, reducing track maintenance. Power plant capacity is far greater than any individual locomotive uses, so electric locomotives can have a higher power output than diesel locomotives and they can produce even higher short-term surge power for fast acceleration. Electric locomotives are ideal for commuter rail service with frequent stops. Electric locomotives are used on freight routes with consistently high traffic volumes, or in areas with advanced rail networks. Power plants, even if they burn fossil fuels, are far cleaner than mobile sources such as locomotive engines. The power can also come from low-carbon or renewable sources, including geothermal power, hydroelectric power, biomass, solar power, nuclear power and wind turbines. Electric locomotives usually cost 20% less than diesel locomotives, their maintenance costs are 25–35% lower, and cost up to 50% less to run.

The chief disadvantage of electrification is the high cost for infrastructure: overhead lines or third rail, substations, and control systems. The impact depends on the intensity of rail traffic on the line, but railroad electrification is rarely cost-effective on lightly or infrequently used tracks.

== History ==
=== Direct current ===
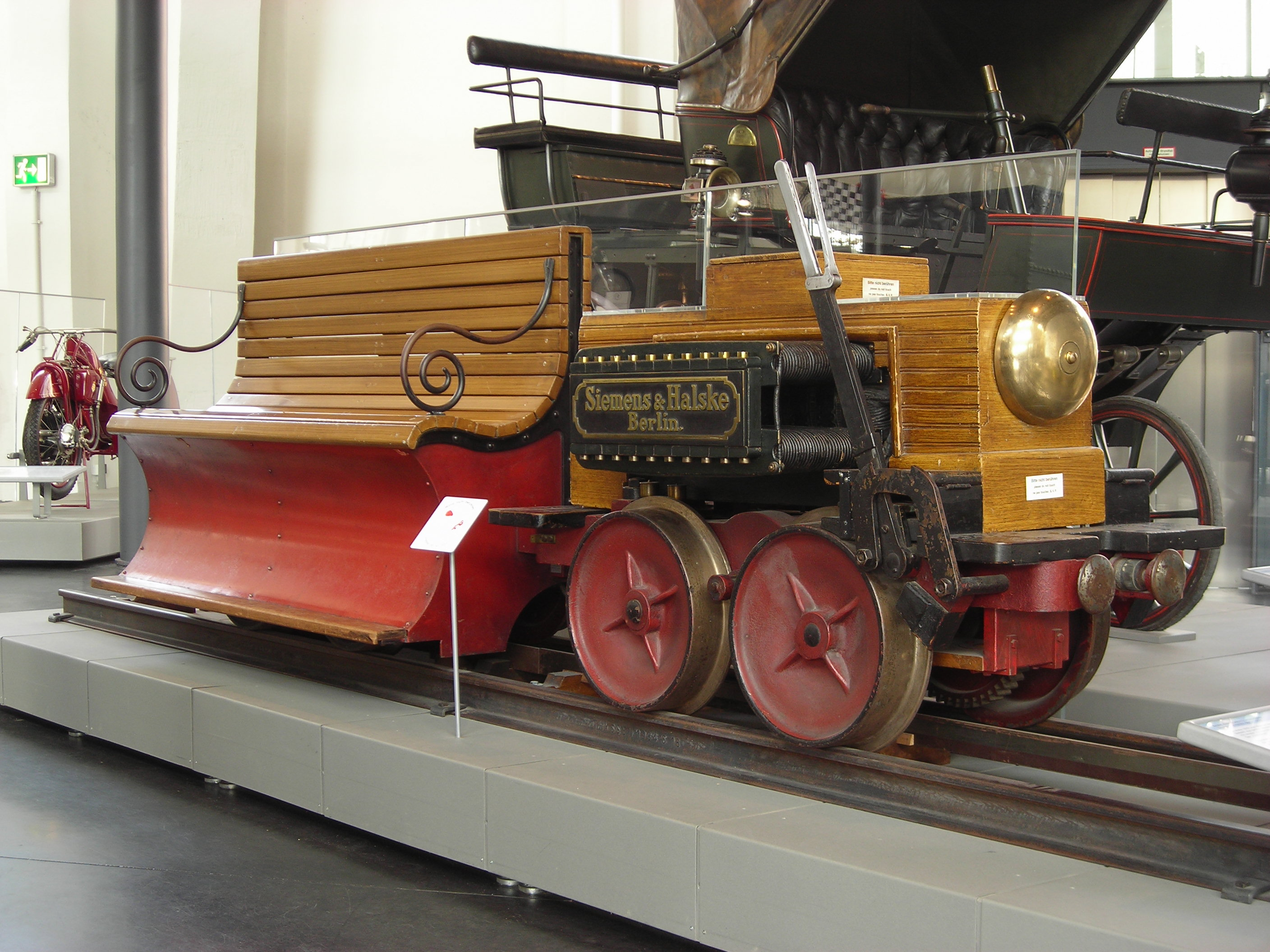
1879 Siemens & Halske experimental train

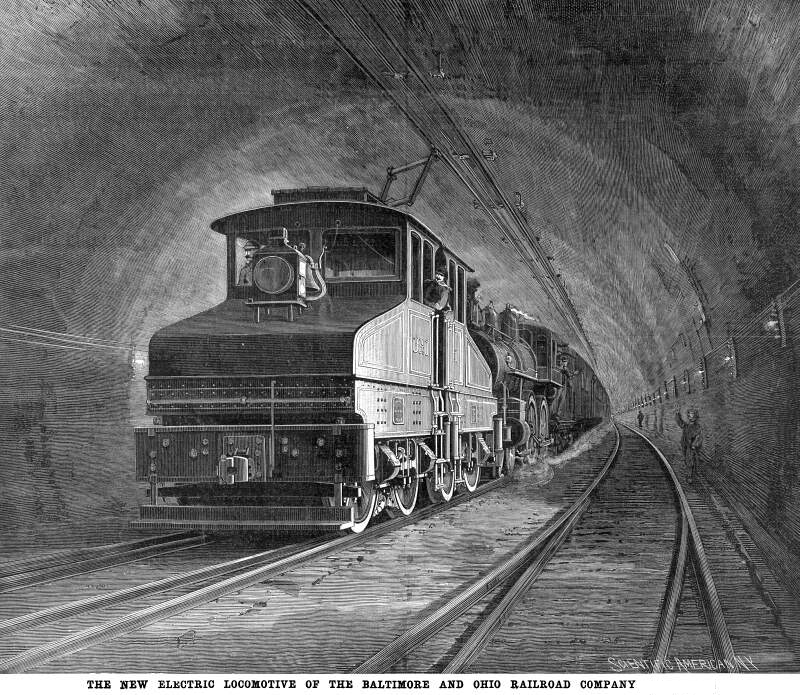
EL-1 Electric locomotive of the Baltimore Belt Line, US 1895: The steam locomotive was not detached for passage through the tunnel. The overhead conductor was a ∩ section bar at the highest point in the roof, so a flexible, flat pantograph was used

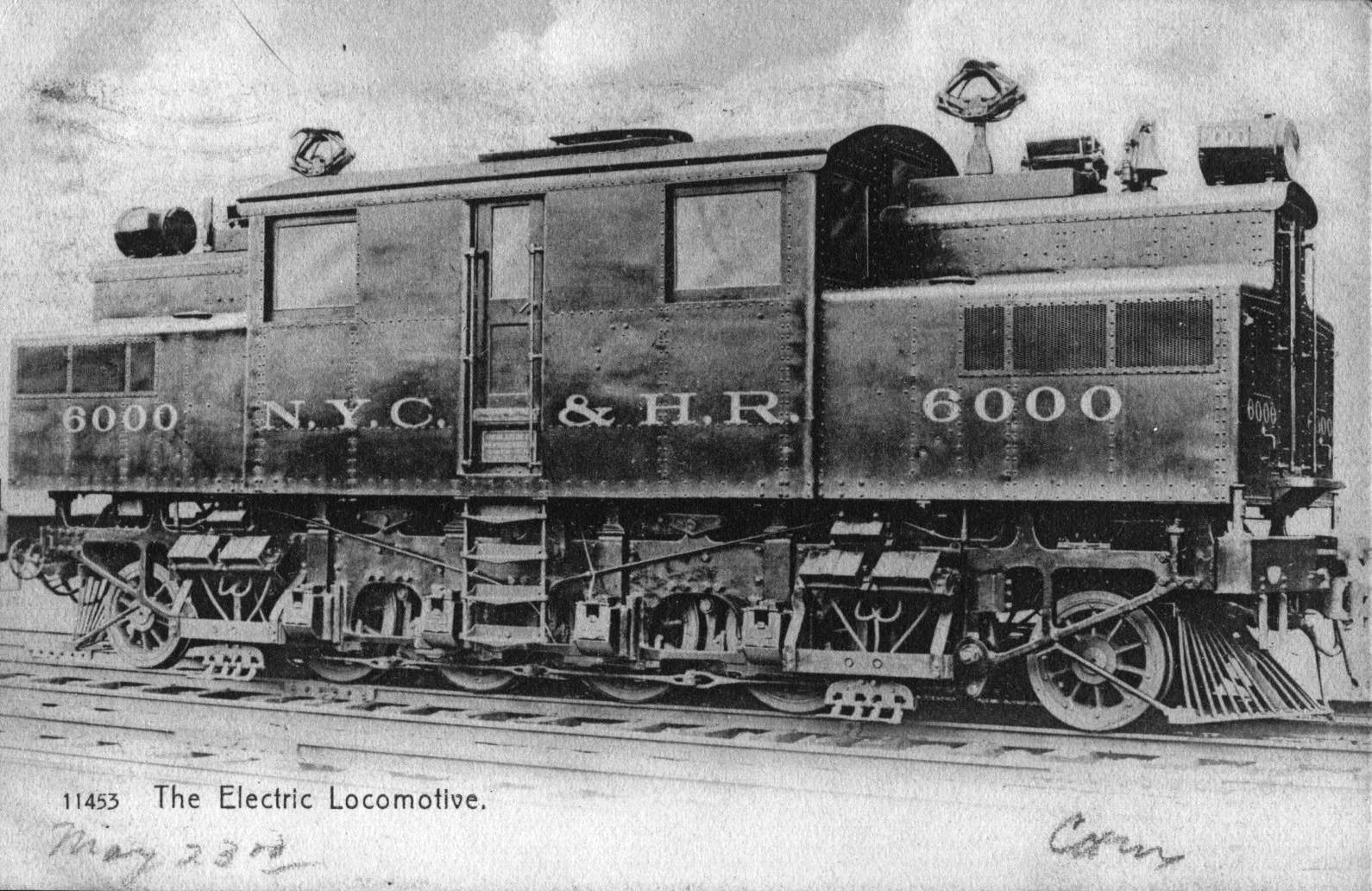
Alco-GE Prototype Class S-1, NYC & HR no. 6000 (DC)

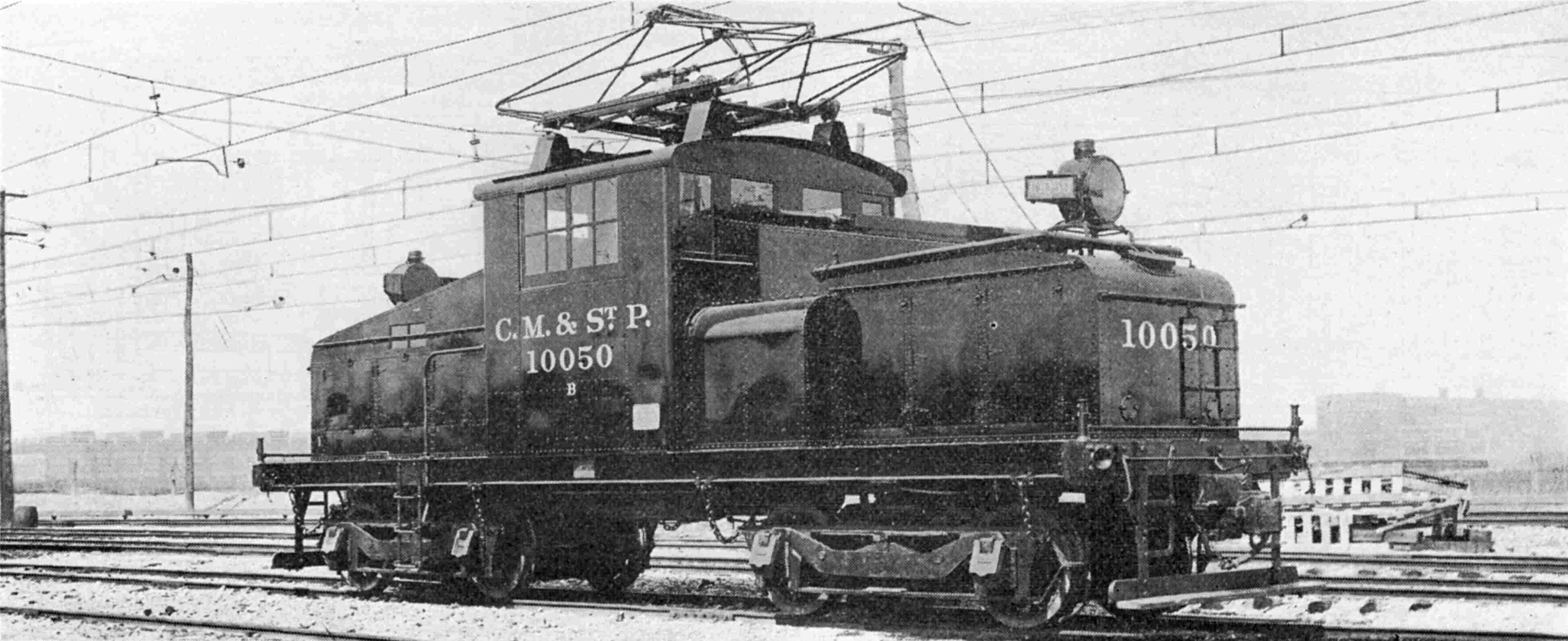
A Milwaukee Road class ES-2, an example of a larger steeplecab switcher for an electrified heavy-duty railroad (DC) 1916

The first known electric locomotive was built in 1837 by chemist Robert Davidson of Aberdeen, and it was powered by galvanic cells (batteries). Davidson later built a larger locomotive named Galvani, exhibited at the Royal Scottish Society of Arts Exhibition in 1841. The seven-ton vehicle had two direct-drive reluctance motors, with fixed electromagnets acting on iron bars attached to a wooden cylinder on each axle, and simple commutators. It hauled a load of six tons at four miles per hour (6 kilometers per hour) for a distance of one and a half miles (2.4 kilometres). It was tested on the Edinburgh and Glasgow Railway in September of the following year, but the limited power from batteries prevented its general use. It was destroyed by railway workers, who saw it as a threat to their job security.

The first electric passenger train and first electric locomotive powered by a generator was presented by Werner von Siemens at Berlin in 1879. The locomotive was driven by a 2.2 kW, series-wound motor, and the train, consisting of the locomotive and three cars, reached a speed of 13 km/h. During four months, the train carried 90,000 passengers on a 300-meter-long (980-foot) circular track. The electricity (150 V DC) was supplied through a third insulated rail between the tracks. A contact roller was used to collect the electricity.

The world's first electric tram line opened in Lichterfelde near Berlin, Germany, in 1881. It was built by Werner von Siemens (see Gross-Lichterfelde Tramway and Berlin Straßenbahn). Volk's Electric Railway opened in 1883 in Brighton. Also in 1883, Mödling and Hinterbrühl Tram opened near Vienna in Austria. It was the first in the world in regular service powered from an overhead line. Five years later, in the U.S. electric trolleys were pioneered in 1888 on the Richmond Union Passenger Railway, using equipment designed by Frank J. Sprague.

The first electrified Hungarian railway lines were opened in 1887. Budapest (See: BHÉV): Ráckeve line (1887), Szentendre line (1888), Gödöllő line (1888), Csepel line (1912).

Much of the early development of electric locomotion was driven by the increasing use of tunnels, particularly in urban areas. Smoke from steam locomotives was noxious and municipalities were increasingly inclined to prohibit their use within their limits. The first electrically worked underground line was the City and South London Railway, prompted by a clause in its enabling act prohibiting the use of steam power. It opened in 1890, using electric locomotives built by Mather and Platt. Electricity quickly became the power supply of choice for subways, abetted by Sprague's invention of multiple-unit train control in 1897. Surface and elevated rapid transit systems generally used steam until forced to convert by ordinance.

The first use of electrification on an American main line was on a four-mile stretch of the Baltimore Belt Line of the Baltimore and Ohio Railroad (B&O) in 1895 connecting the main portion of the B&O to the new line to New York through a series of tunnels around the edges of Baltimore's downtown. Parallel tracks on the Pennsylvania Railroad had shown that coal smoke from steam locomotives would be a major operating issue and a public nuisance. Three Bo+Bo units were initially used, the EL-1 Model. At the south end of the electrified section; they coupled onto the locomotive and train and pulled it through the tunnels. Railroad entrances to New York City required similar tunnels and the smoke problems were more acute there. A collision in the Park Avenue tunnel in 1902 led the New York State legislature to outlaw the use of smoke-generating locomotives south of the Harlem River after 1 July 1908. In response, electric locomotives began operation in 1904 on the New York Central Railroad. In the 1930s, the Pennsylvania Railroad, which had introduced electric locomotives because of the NYC regulation, electrified its entire territory east of Harrisburg, Pennsylvania.

The Chicago, Milwaukee, St. Paul, and Pacific Railroad (the Milwaukee Road), the last transcontinental line to be built, electrified its lines across the Rocky Mountains and to the Pacific Ocean starting in 1915. A few East Coastlines, notably the Virginian Railway and the Norfolk and Western Railway, electrified short sections of their mountain crossings. However, by this point electrification in the United States was more associated with dense urban traffic and the use of electric locomotives declined in the face of dieselization. Diesel shared some of the electric locomotive's advantages over steam and the cost of building and maintaining the power supply infrastructure, which discouraged new installations, brought on the elimination of most main-line electrification outside the Northeast. Except for a few captive systems (e.g. the Deseret Power Railroad), by 2000 electrification was confined to the Northeast Corridor and some commuter service; even there, freight service was handled by diesel. Development continued in Europe, where electrification was widespread. 1,500 V DC is still used on some lines near France and 25 kV 50 Hz is used by high-speed trains.

=== Alternating current ===
The first practical AC electric locomotive was designed by Charles Brown, then working for Oerlikon, Zürich. In 1891, Brown had demonstrated long-distance power transmission for the International Electrotechnical Exhibition, using three-phase AC, between a hydro–electric plant at Lauffen am Neckar and the expo site at Frankfurt am Main West, a distance of 280 km. Using experience he had gained while working for Jean Heilmann on steam–electric locomotive designs, Brown observed that three-phase motors had a higher power-to-weight ratio than DC motors and, because of the absence of a commutator, were simpler to manufacture and maintain. (Note: Heilmann evaluated both AC and DC electric transmission for his locomotives, but eventually settled on a design based on Thomas Edison's DC system.) However, they were much larger than the DC motors of the time and could not be mounted in underfloor bogies: they could only be carried within locomotive bodies. In 1896, Oerlikon installed the first commercial example of the system on the Lugano Tramway. Each 30-tonne locomotive had two 110 kW (150 hp) motors run by three-phase 750 V 40 Hz fed from double overhead lines. Three-phase motors run at a constant speed and provide regenerative braking and are thus well suited to steeply graded routes; in 1899 Brown (by then in partnership with Walter Boveri) supplied the first main-line three-phase locomotives to the 40 km Burgdorf–Thun railway (highest point 770 metres), Switzerland. The first implementation of industrial frequency single-phase AC supply for locomotives came from Oerlikon in 1901, using the designs of Hans Behn-Eschenburg and Emil Huber-Stockar; installation on the Seebach-Wettingen line of the Swiss Federal Railways was completed in 1904. The 15 kV, 50 Hz 345 kW (460 hp), 48 tonne locomotives used transformers and rotary converters to power DC traction motors.

In 1894, Hungarian engineer Kálmán Kandó developed a new type 3-phase asynchronous electric drive motors and generators for electric locomotives at the Fives-Lille Company. Kandó's early 1894 designs were first applied in a short three-phase AC tramway in Évian-les-Bains (France), which was constructed between 1896 and 1898. In 1918, Kandó invented and developed the rotary phase converter, enabling electric locomotives to use three-phase motors whilst supplied via a single overhead wire, carrying the simple industrial frequency (50 Hz) single phase AC of the high voltage national networks.

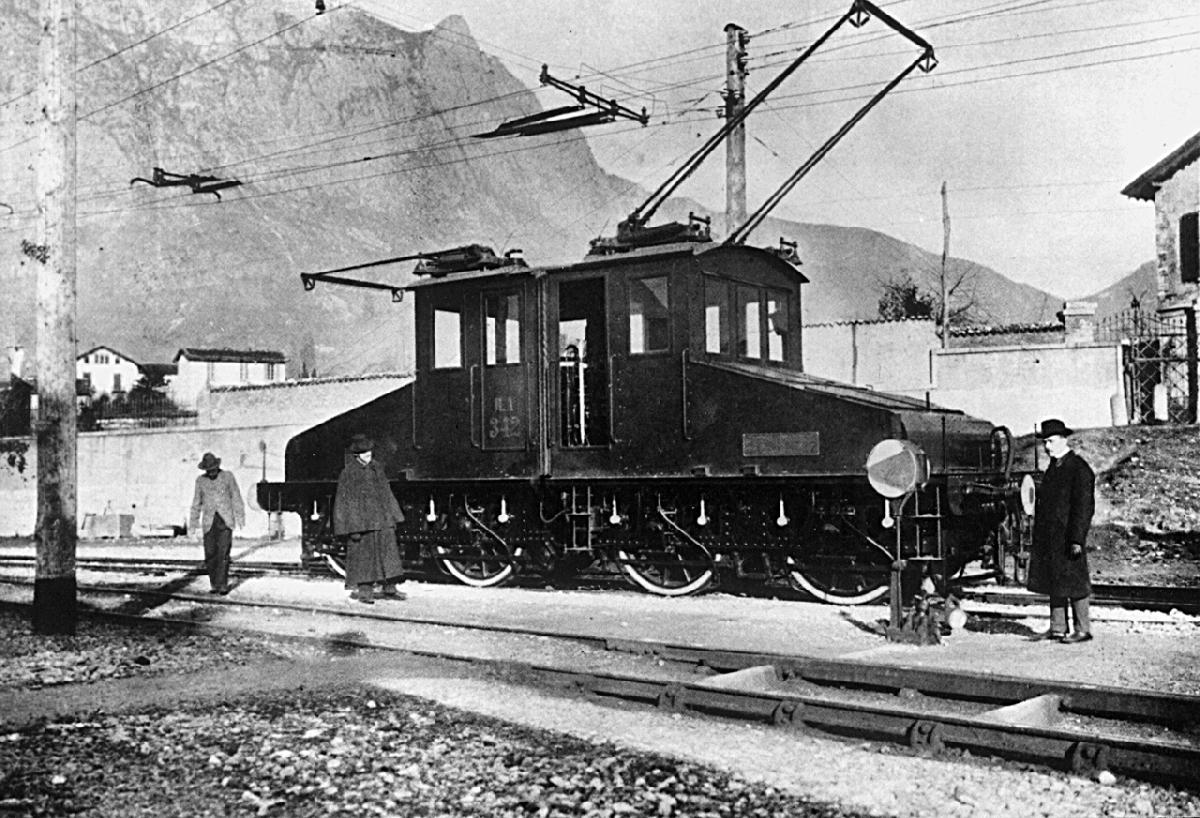
A prototype of a Ganz AC electric locomotive in Valtellina, Italy, 1901

Italian railways were the first in the world to introduce electric traction for the entire length of a mainline rather than just a short stretch. The 106 km Valtellina line was opened on 4 September 1902, designed by Kandó and a team from the Ganz Works. The electrical system was three-phase at 3 kV 15 Hz. The voltage was significantly higher than used earlier and it required new designs for electric motors and switching devices. The three-phase two-wire system was used on several railways in Northern Italy and became known as "the Italian system". Kandó was invited in 1905 to undertake the management of Società Italiana Westinghouse and led the development of several Italian electric locomotives. During the period of electrification of the Italian railways, tests were made as to which type of power to use: in some sections there was a 3,600 V 16 2/3 Hz three-phase power supply, in others there was 1,500 V DC, 3 kV DC and 10 kV AC 45 Hz supply. After WW2, 3 kV DC power was chosen for the entire Italian railway system.

A later development of Kandó, working with both the Ganz works and Societa Italiana Westinghouse, was an electro-mechanical converter, allowing the use of three-phase motors from single-phase AC, eliminating the need for two overhead wires. In 1923, the first phase-converter locomotive in Hungary was constructed on the basis of Kandó's designs and serial production began soon after. The first installation, at 16 kV 50 Hz, was in 1932 on the 56 km section of the Hungarian State Railways between Budapest and Komárom. This proved successful and the electrification was extended to Hegyeshalom in 1934.

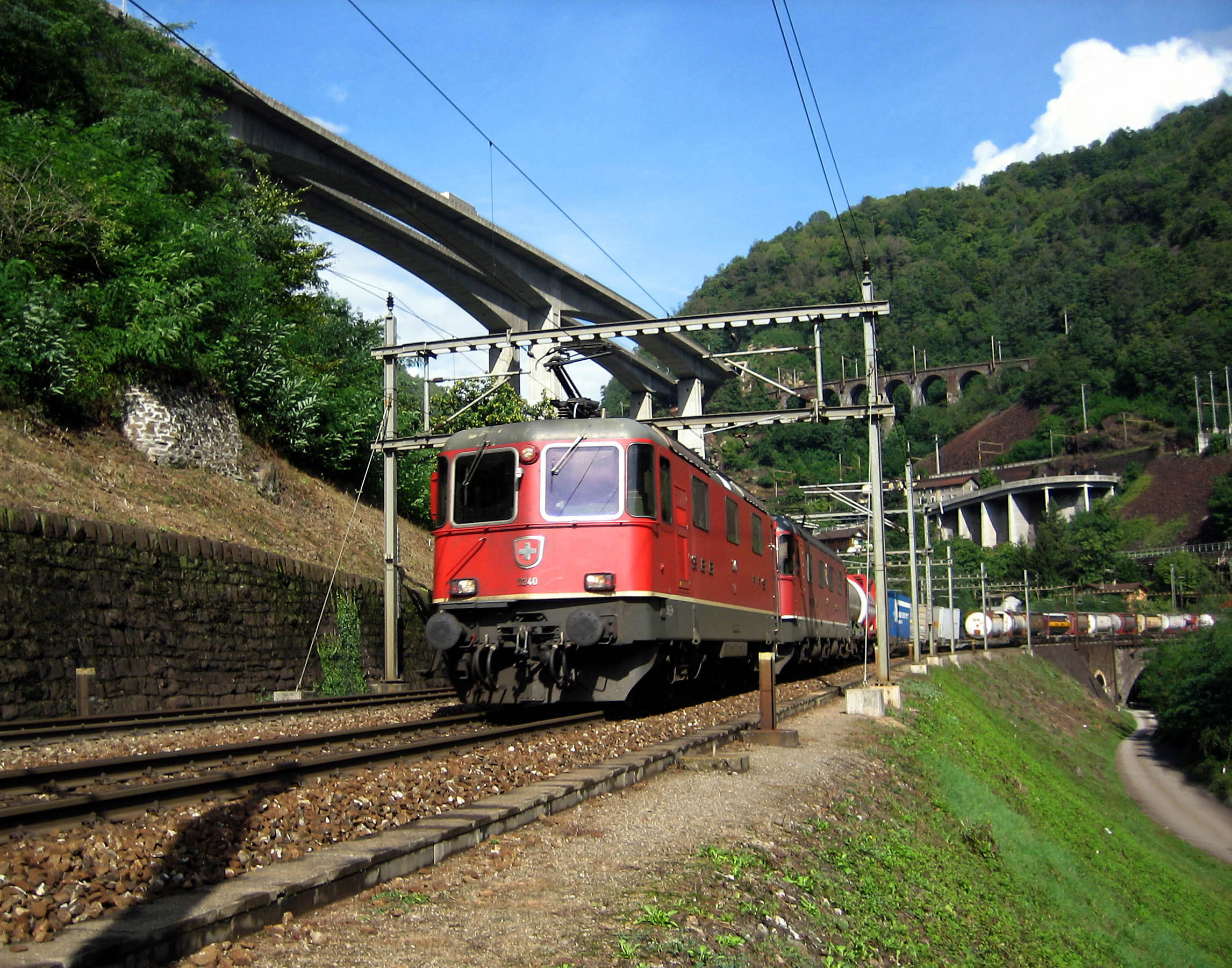
A Swiss Re 420 leads a freight train down the south side of the Gotthard line, which was electrified in 1922. The masts and lines of the catenary can be seen.

In Europe, electrification projects initially focused on mountainous regions for several reasons: coal supplies were difficult, hydroelectric power was readily available, and electric locomotives gave more traction on steeper lines. This was particularly applicable in Switzerland, where almost all lines are electrified. An important contribution to the wider adoption of AC traction came from SNCF of France after World War II. The company had assessed the industrial-frequency AC line routed through the steep Höllental Valley, Germany, which was under French administration following the war. After trials, the company decided that the performance of AC locomotives was sufficiently developed to allow all its future installations, regardless of terrain, to be of this standard, with its associated cheaper and more efficient infrastructure. The SNCF decision, ignoring as it did the 2,000 miles (3,200 km) of high-voltage DC already installed on French routes, was influential in the standard selected for other countries in Europe.

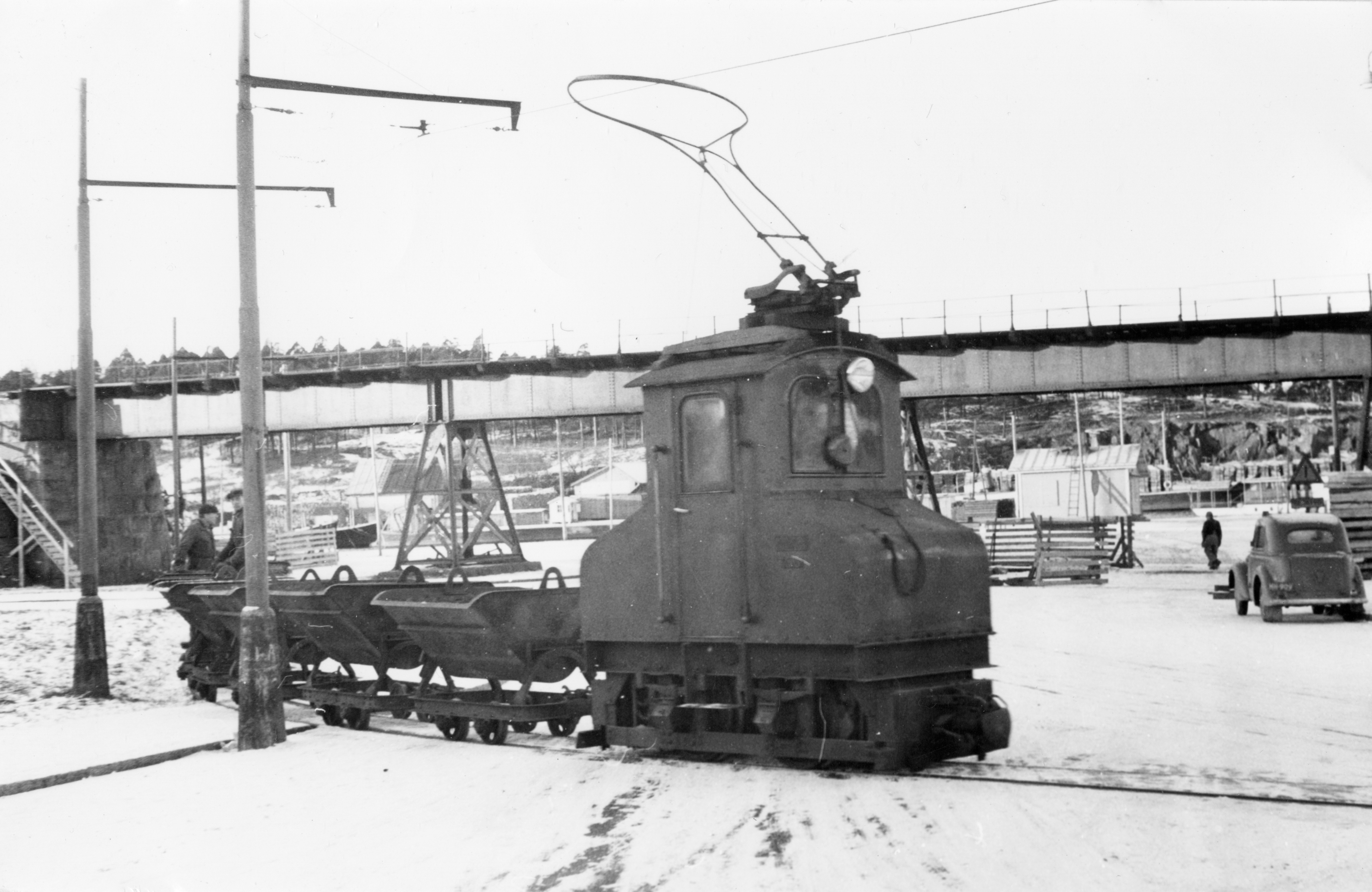
Pikku-Pässi, a small electric locomotive of the Finlayson company in Tampere, Finland, in 1950s

The 1960s saw the electrification of many European main lines. European electric locomotive technology had improved steadily from the 1920s onwards. By comparison, the Milwaukee Road class EP-2 (1918) weighed 240 t, with a power of 3,330 kW and a maximum speed of 112 km/h; in 1935, German E 18 had a power of 2,800 kW, but weighed only 108 tons and had a maximum speed of 150 km/h. On 29 March 1955, French locomotive CC 7107 reached 331 km/h. In 1960 the SJ Class Dm 3 locomotives on Swedish Railways produced a record 7,200 kW. Locomotives capable of commercial passenger service at 200 km/h appeared in Germany and France in the same period. Further improvements resulted from the introduction of electronic control systems, which permitted the use of increasingly lighter and more powerful motors that could be fitted inside the bogies (standardizing from the 1990s onwards on asynchronous three-phase motors, fed through GTO-inverters).

In the 1980s, the development of very high-speed service brought further electrification. The Japanese Shinkansen and the French TGV were the first systems for which devoted high-speed lines were built from scratch. Similar programs were undertaken in Italy, Germany and Spain; in the United States the only new mainline service was an extension of electrification over the Northeast Corridor from New Haven, Connecticut, to Boston, Massachusetts, though new electric light rail systems continued to be built.

On 2 September 2006, a standard production Siemens electric locomotive of the Eurosprinter type ES64-U4 (ÖBB Class 1216) achieved 357 km/h (222 mph), the record for a locomotive-hauled train, on the new line between Ingolstadt and Nuremberg. This locomotive is now employed largely unmodified by ÖBB to haul their Railjet which is however limited to a top speed of 230 km/h due to economic and infrastructure concerns.

== Types ==
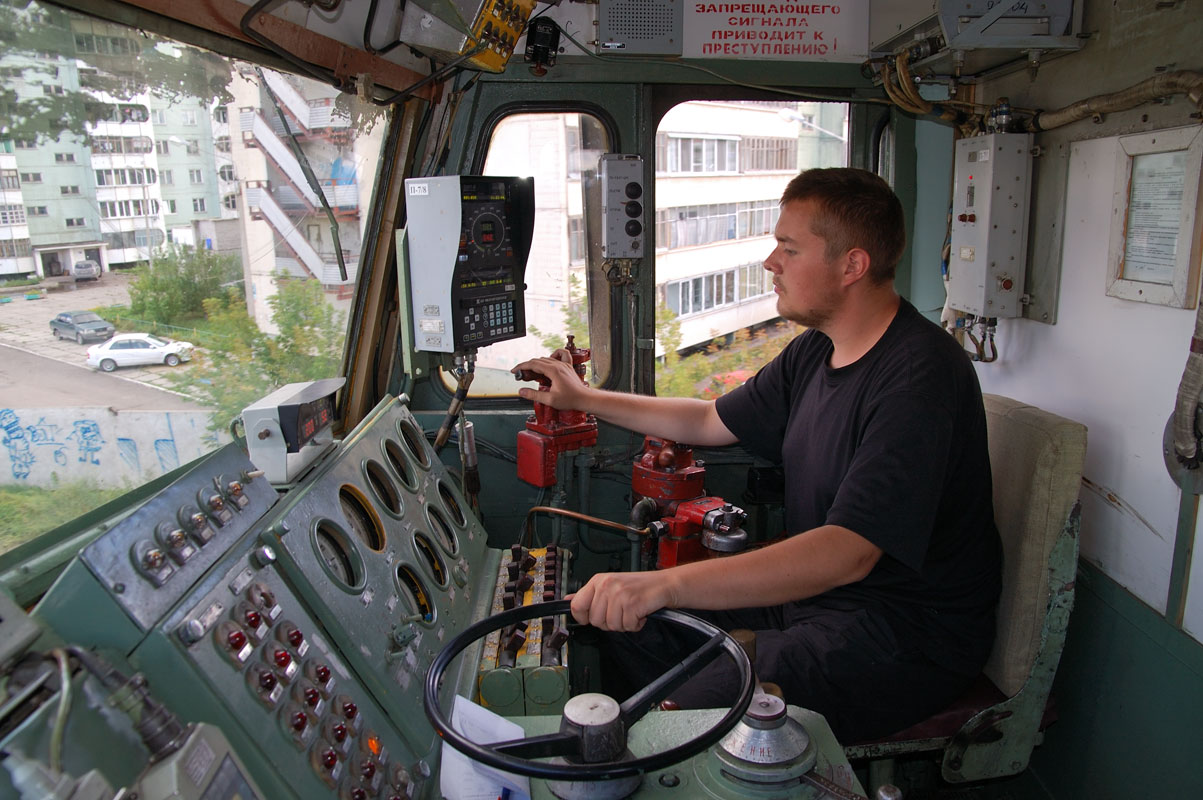
The operating controls of VL80R freight locomotive from Russian Railways. The wheel controls motor power.

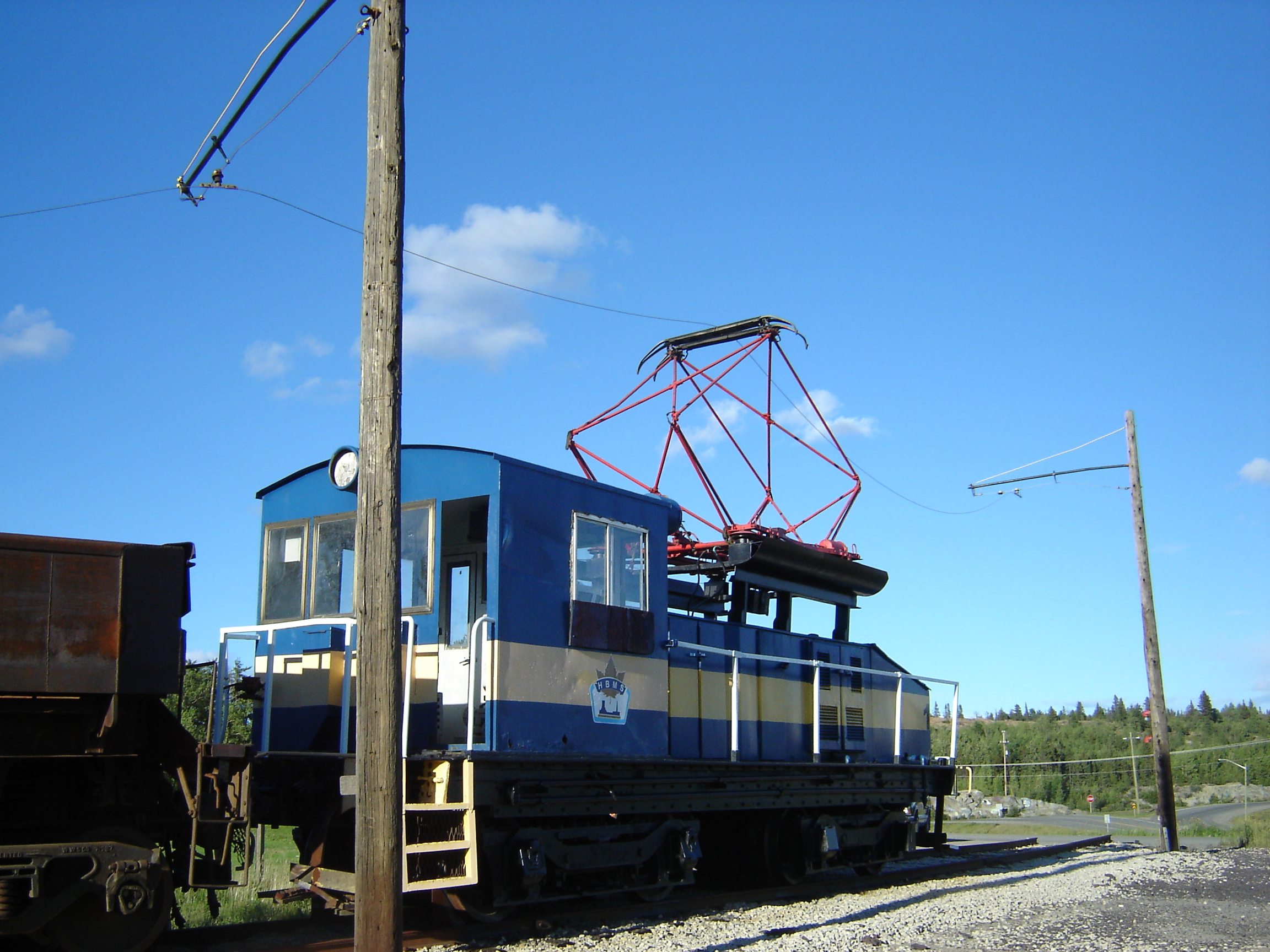
Electric locomotive used in mining operations in Flin Flon, Manitoba. This locomotive is on display and not currently in service.

An electric locomotive can be supplied with power from

- Rechargeable energy storage systems, such as a battery or ultracapacitor-powered mining locomotives.
- A stationary source, such as a third rail or overhead wire.
- A mixture of both.

The distinguishing design features of electric locomotives are:

- The type of electrical power used, AC or DC.
- The method of storing (batteries, ultracapacitors), collecting (transmission) electrical power, and/or mixed method.
- The means used to couple the traction motors to the driving wheels (drivers).

=== Direct and alternating current ===
The most fundamental difference lies in the choice of AC or DC. The earliest systems used DC, as AC was not well understood and insulation material for high voltage lines was not available. DC locomotives typically run at relatively low voltage (600 to 3,000 volts); the equipment is therefore relatively massive because the currents involved are large in order to transmit sufficient power. Power must be supplied at frequent intervals as the high currents result in large transmission system losses.

As AC motors were developed, they became the predominant type, particularly on longer routes. High voltages (tens of thousands of volts) are used because this allows the use of low currents; transmission losses are proportional to the square of the current (e.g. twice the current means four times the loss). Thus, high power can be conducted over long distances on lighter and cheaper wires. Transformers in the locomotives transform this power to a low voltage and high current for the motors. A similar high voltage, low current system could not be employed with direct current locomotives because there is no easy way to do the voltage/current transformation for DC so efficiently as achieved by AC transformers.

AC traction still occasionally uses dual overhead wires instead of single-phase lines. The resulting three-phase current drives induction motors, which do not have sensitive commutators and permit easy realisation of a regenerative brake. Speed is controlled by changing the number of pole pairs in the stator circuit, with acceleration controlled by switching additional resistors in, or out, of the rotor circuit. The two-phase lines are heavy and complicated near switches, where the phases have to cross each other. The system was widely used in northern Italy until 1976 and is still in use on some Swiss rack railways. The simple feasibility of a fail-safe electric brake is an advantage of the system, while speed control and the two-phase lines are problematic.

The Swedish Rc locomotive was the first series locomotive that used thyristors with DC motors.

Rectifier locomotives, which used AC power transmission and DC motors, were common, though DC commutators had problems both in starting and at low velocities. Today's advanced electric locomotives use brushless three-phase AC induction motors. These polyphase machines are powered from GTO-, IGCT- or IGBT-based inverters. The cost of electronic devices in a modern locomotive can be up to 50% of the cost of the vehicle.

Electric traction allows the use of regenerative braking, in which the motors are used as brakes and become generators that transform the motion of the train into electrical power that is then fed back into the lines. This system is particularly advantageous in mountainous operations, as descending locomotives can produce a large portion of the power required for ascending trains. Most systems have a characteristic voltage and, in the case of AC power, a system frequency. Many locomotives have been equipped to handle multiple voltages and frequencies as systems came to overlap or were upgraded. American FL9 locomotives were equipped to handle power from two different electrical systems and could also operate as diesel–electrics.

While today's systems predominantly operate on AC, many DC systems are still in use – e.g., in South Africa and the United Kingdom (750 V and 1,500 V); Netherlands, Japan, Ireland (1,500 V); Slovenia, Belgium, Italy, Poland, Russia, Spain (3,000 V) and Washington, D.C. (750 V).

=== Power transmission ===
A classic pantograph

A modern half-pantograph

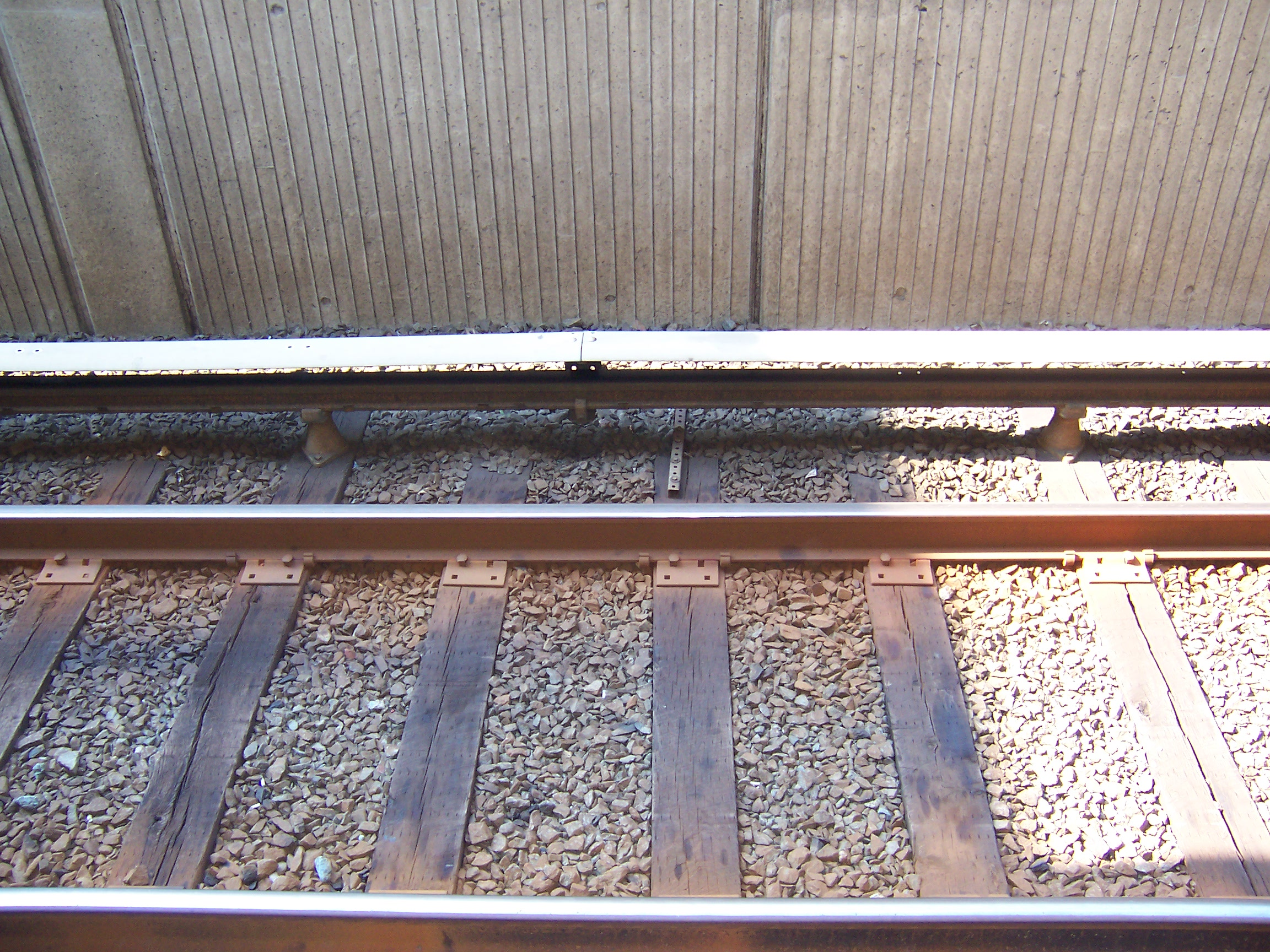
Third rail at the West Falls Church Metro station near Washington, D.C., electrified at 750 volts. The third rail is at the top of the image, with a white canopy above it. The two lower rails are the ordinary running rails; current from the third rail returns to the power station through these.

Electrical circuits require two connections (or for three phase AC, three connections). From the beginning, the track was used for one side of the circuit. Unlike model railroads the track normally supplies only one side, the other side(s) of the circuit being provided separately.

==== Overhead lines ====
Railways generally tend to prefer overhead lines, often called "catenaries" after the support system used to hold the wire parallel to the ground. Three collection methods are possible:

- Trolley pole: a long flexible pole, which engages the line with a wheel or shoe.
- Bow collector: a frame that holds a long collecting rod against the wire.
- Pantograph: a hinged frame that holds the collecting shoes against the wire in a fixed geometry.

Of the three, the pantograph method is best suited for high-speed operation. Some locomotives use both overhead and third rail collection (e.g. British Rail Class 92). In Europe, the recommended geometry and shape of pantographs are defined by standard EN 50367/IEC 60486

==== Third rail ====
Mass transit systems and suburban lines often use a third rail instead of overhead wire. It allows for smaller tunnels and lower clearance under bridges, and has advantages for intensive traffic that it is a very sturdy system, not sensitive to snapping overhead wires. Some systems use four rails, especially some lines in the London Underground. One setback for third rail systems is that level crossings become more complex, usually requiring a gap section.

The original Baltimore and Ohio Railroad electrification used a sliding pickup (a contact shoe or simply the "shoe") in an overhead channel, a system quickly found to be unsatisfactory. It was replaced by a third rail, in which a pickup rides underneath or on top of a smaller rail parallel to the main track, above ground level. There are multiple pickups on both sides of the locomotive in order to accommodate the breaks in the third rail required by trackwork. This system is preferred in subways because of the close clearances it affords.

=== Driving the wheels ===
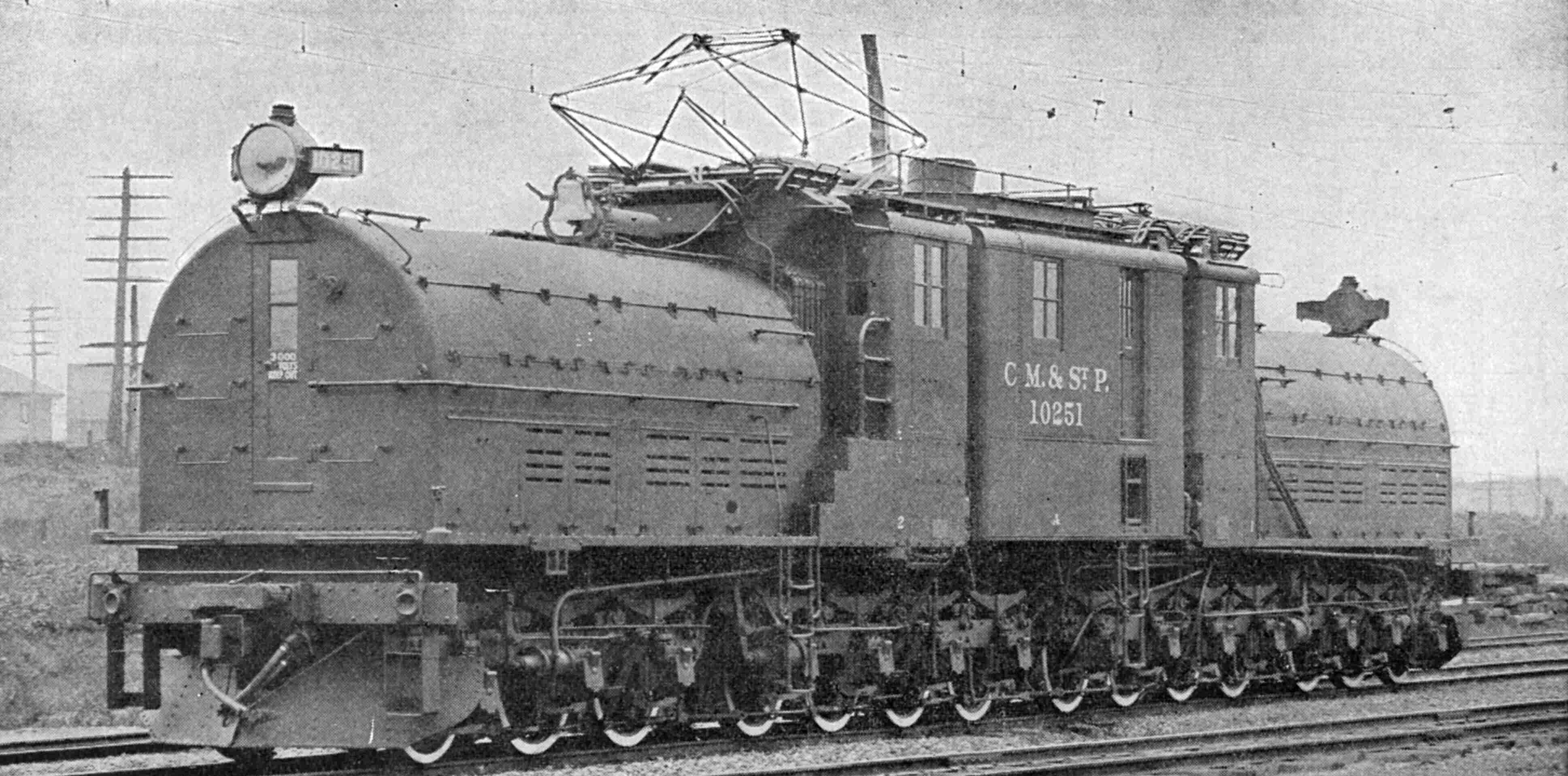
One of the Milwaukee Road EP-2 "Bi-polar" electrics

During the initial development of railroad electrical propulsion, a number of drive systems were devised to couple the output of the traction motors to the wheels. Early locomotives often used jackshaft drives. In this arrangement, the traction motor is mounted within the body of the locomotive and drives the jackshaft through a set of gears. This system was employed because the first traction motors were too large and heavy to mount directly on the axles. Due to the number of mechanical parts involved, frequent maintenance was necessary. The jackshaft drive was abandoned for all but the smallest units when smaller and lighter motors were developed.

Several other systems were devised as the electric locomotive matured. The Buchli drive was a fully spring-loaded system, in which the weight of the driving motors was completely disconnected from the driving wheels. First used in electric locomotives from the 1920s, the Buchli drive was mainly used by the French SNCF and Swiss Federal Railways. The quill drive was also developed about this time and mounted the traction motor above or to the side of the axle and coupled to the axle through a reduction gear and a hollow shaft – the quill – flexibly connected to the driving axle. The Pennsylvania Railroad GG1 locomotive used a quill drive. Again, as traction motors continued to shrink in size and weight, quill drives gradually fell out of favor in low-speed freight locomotives. In high-speed passenger locomotives used in Europe, the quill drive is still predominant.

Another drive was the "bi-polar" system, in which the motor armature was the axle itself, the frame and field assembly of the motor being attached to the truck (bogie) in a fixed position. The motor had two field poles, which allowed a limited amount of vertical movement of the armature. This system was of limited value since the power output of each motor was limited. The EP-2 bi-polar electrics used by the Milwaukee Road compensated for this problem by using a large number of powered axles.

Modern freight electric locomotives, like their diesel–electric counterparts, almost universally use axle-hung traction motors, with one motor for each powered axle. In this arrangement, one side of the motor housing is supported by plain bearings riding on a ground and polished journal that is integral to the axle. The other side of the housing has a tongue-shaped protuberance that engages a matching slot in the truck (bogie) bolster, its purpose being to act as a torque reaction device, as well as support. Power transfer from the motor to the axle is effected by spur gearing, in which a pinion on the motor shaft engages a bull gear on the axle. Both gears are enclosed in a liquid-tight housing containing lubricating oil. The type of service in which the locomotive is used dictates the gear ratio employed. Numerically high ratios are commonly found on freight units, whereas numerically low ratios are typical of passenger engines.

=== Wheel arrangements ===
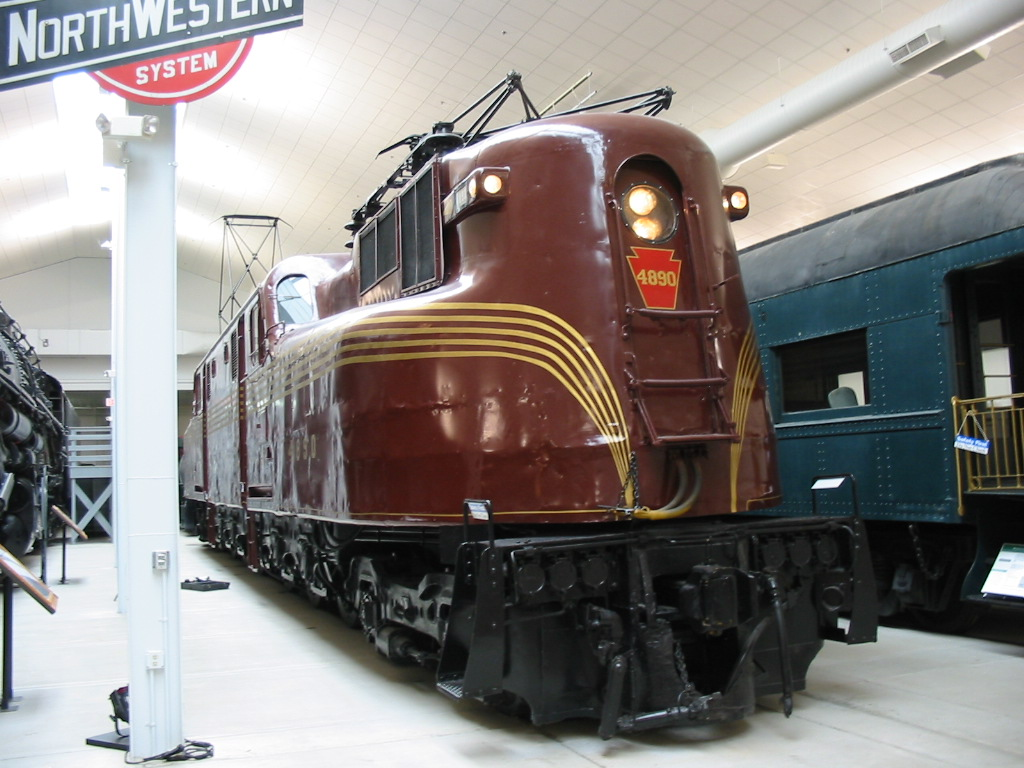
A GG1 electric locomotive

The Whyte notation system for classifying steam locomotives is not adequate for describing the variety of electric locomotive arrangements, though the Pennsylvania Railroad applied classes to its electric locomotives as if they were steam. For example, the PRR GG1 class indicates that it is arranged like two 4-6-0 class G locomotives coupled back-to-back.

UIC classification system was typically used for electric locomotives, as it could handle the complex arrangements of powered and unpowered axles and could distinguish between coupled and uncoupled drive systems.

=== Battery locomotive ===
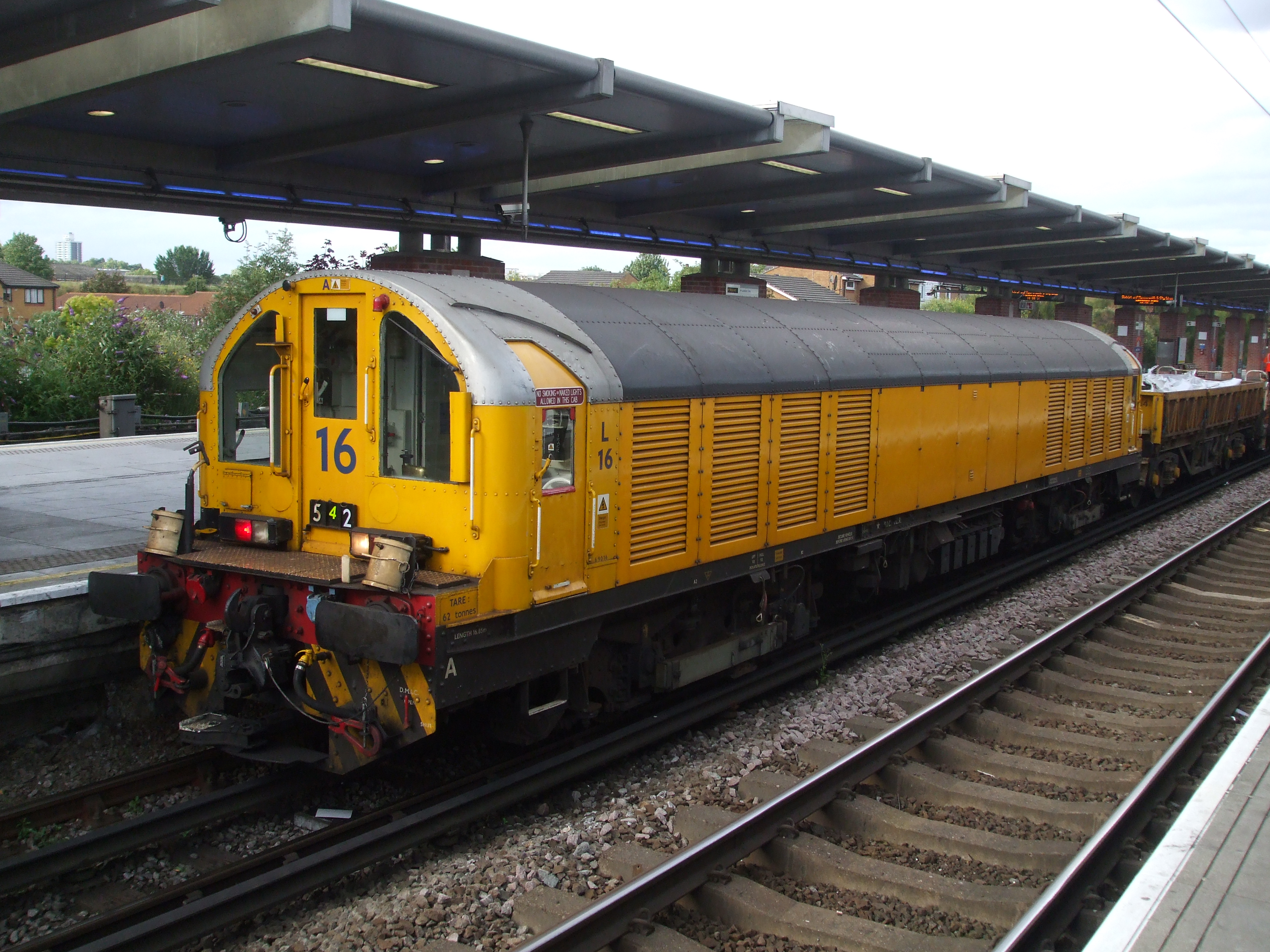
A London Underground battery–electric locomotive at West Ham station used for hauling engineers' trains

A battery–electric locomotive (or battery locomotive) is powered by onboard batteries; a kind of battery electric vehicle.

Such locomotives are used where a diesel or conventional electric locomotive would be unsuitable. An example is maintenance trains on underground lines when the electricity supply is turned off. Another use for battery locomotives is in industrial facilities (e.g. explosives factories, oil, and gas refineries or chemical factories) where a combustion-powered locomotive (i.e., steam- or diesel-powered) could cause a safety issue due to the risks of fire, explosion or fumes in a confined space. Battery locomotives are preferred for mine railways where gas could be ignited by trolley-powered units arcing at the collection shoes, or where excessive electrical resistance could develop in the supply or return circuits, especially due to poor contact at rail joints, and allow dangerous current leakage into the ground.

The first electric locomotive built in 1837 was a battery locomotive. It was built by chemist Robert Davidson of Aberdeen in Scotland, and it was powered by galvanic cells (batteries). Another early example was at the Kennecott Copper Mine, McCarthy, Alaska, wherein 1917 the underground haulage ways were widened to enable working by two battery locomotives of 4 1/2 short tons (4.0 long tons; 4.1 t). In 1928, Kennecott Copper ordered four 700-series electric locomotives with onboard batteries. These locomotives weighed 85 short tons (76 long tons; 77 t) and operated on 750 volts overhead trolley wire with considerable further range whilst running on batteries. The locomotives provided several decades of service using nickel–iron battery (Edison) technology. The batteries were replaced with lead-acid batteries, and the locomotives were retired shortly afterward. All four locomotives were donated to museums, but one was scrapped. The others can be seen at the Boone and Scenic Valley Railroad, Iowa, and at the Western Railway Museum in Rio Vista, California.

The Toronto Transit Commission previously operated on the Toronto subway a battery electric locomotive built by Nippon Sharyo in 1968 and retired in 2009.

London Underground regularly operates battery–electric locomotives for general maintenance work.

As of 2022, battery locomotives with 7 and 14 MWh energy capacity have been ordered by rail lines and are under development. In 2026, two classes of battery locomotives are in testing in Western Australian mining railways, the Wabtec FLXDrive for BHP and another class built by Progress Rail for Fortescue.

In December 2024, the Grand Canyon Railway, which operates passenger excursion trains to the Grand Canyon National Park, announced that they would rebuild one of their EMD F40PHs as a battery-electric locomotive to reduce diesel emissions and maintenance costs. In January 2026, Cuyahoga Valley Scenic Railroad, which operates excursions through the Cuyahoga Valley National Park, similarly announced that they would rebuild two of their MLW FPA-4s as battery-electric units.

Siemens Mobility announced the Charger B+AC passenger locomotive in June 2025, with an order from Metro-North Railroad in the United States. The B+AC Charger locomotives can operate on either overhead catenary wire or from a 3.1 mega-watt hour (MWh) on-board battery. The locomotive is capable of 4.0 megawatts (5,400 hp) when running from overhead wires and 3.3 megawatts (4,400 hp) on battery mode. Claimed range on battery is 100 mi (160 km), dependent on train configuration and route characteristics. The battery can be charged either en-route from overhead catenary wires, or from a 480V plug. Energy recovered from regenerative braking can also charge the battery.

=== Supercapacitor power storage ===
In 2020, Zhuzhou Electric Locomotive Company, manufacturers of stored electrical power systems using supercapacitors initially developed for use in trams, announced that they were extending their product line to include locomotives.

== Electric locomotives around the world ==
=== Europe ===
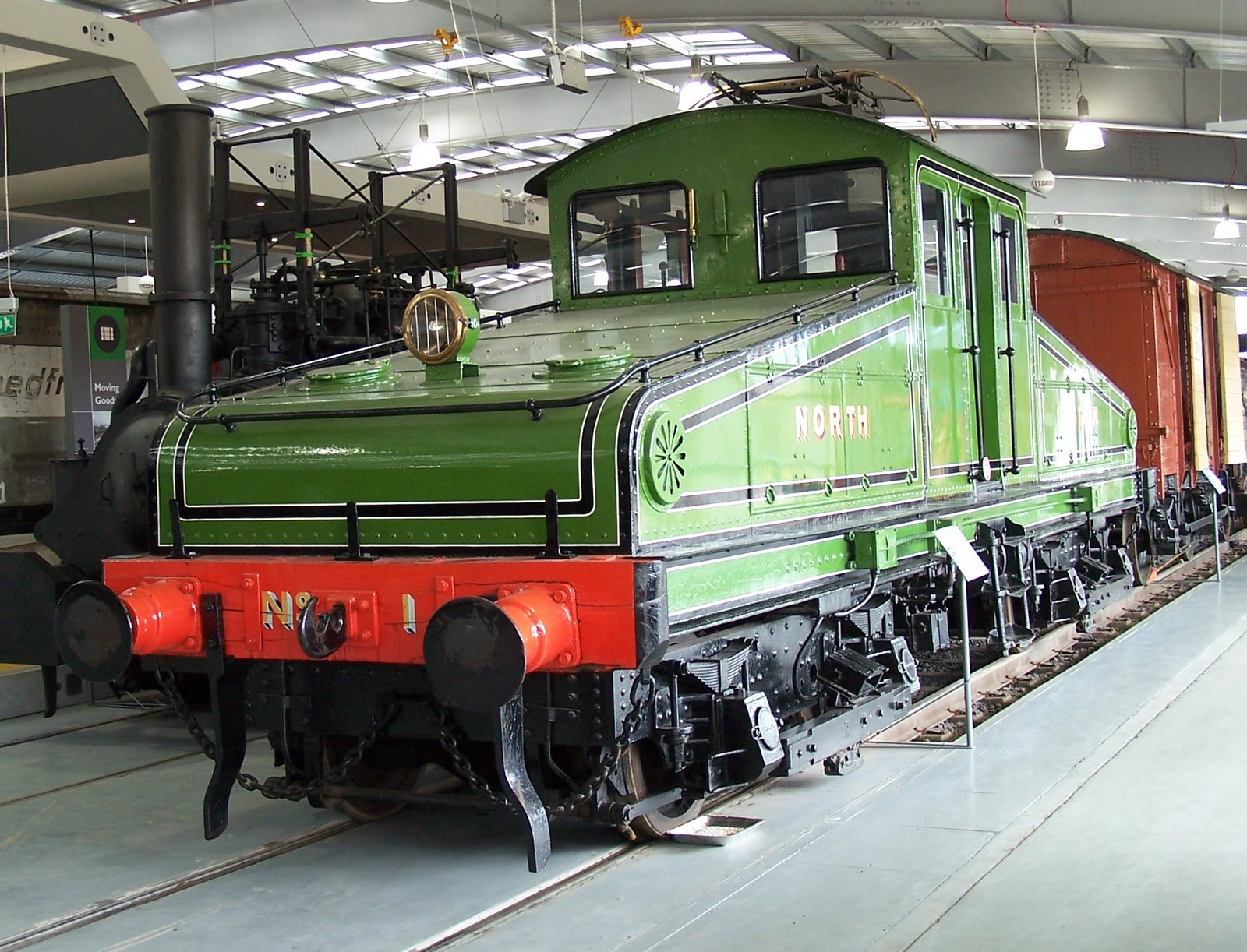
NER No.1, Locomotion museum, Shildon

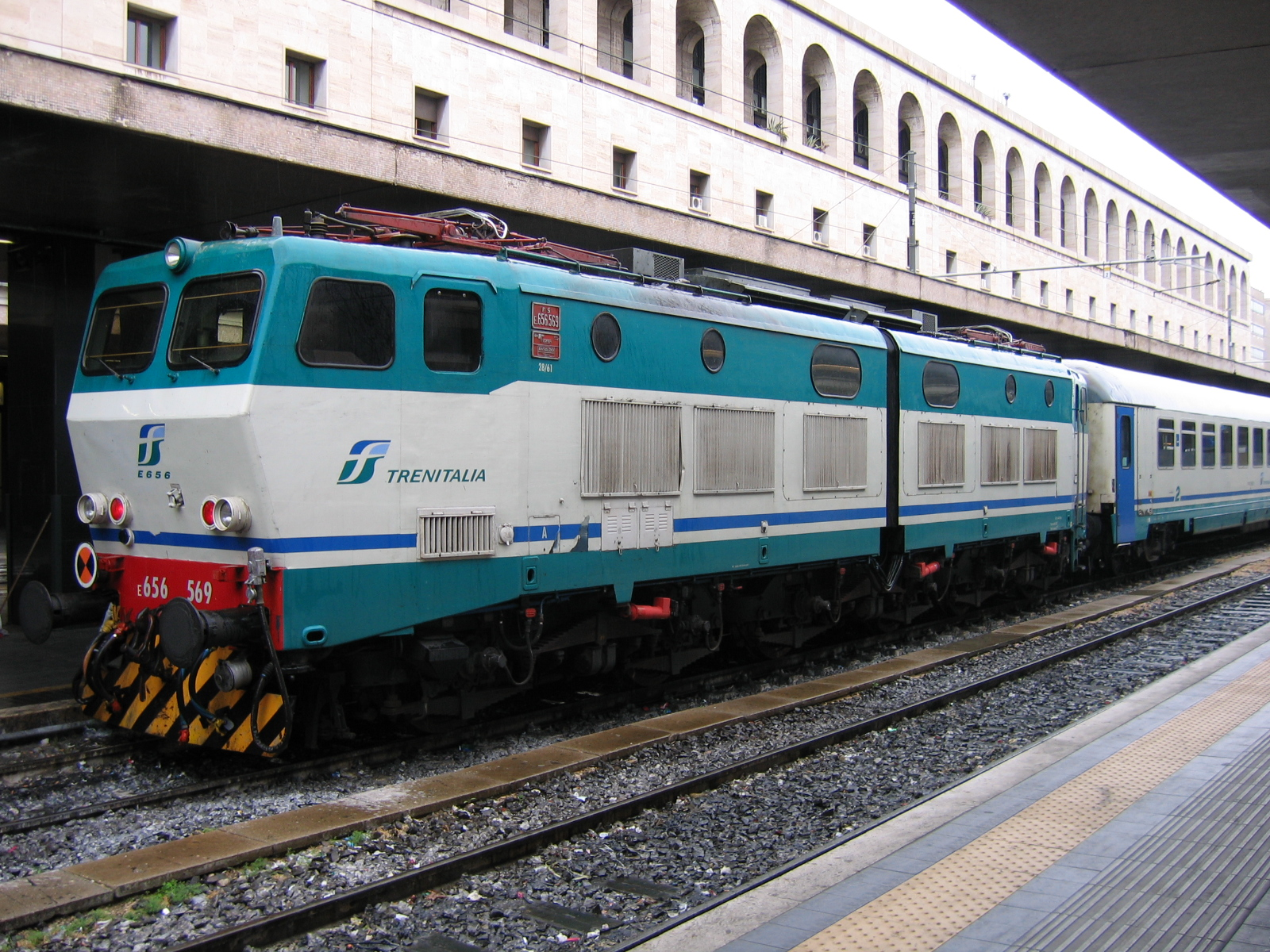
FS Class E656, an articulated Bo'-Bo'-Bo' locomotive, manages more easily the tight curves often found on the Italian railways

Electrification is widespread in Europe, with electric multiple units commonly used for passenger trains. Due to higher density schedules, operating costs are more dominant with respect to the infrastructure costs than in the U.S. and electric locomotives have much lower operating costs than diesel. In addition, governments were motivated to electrify their railway networks due to coal shortages experienced during the First and Second World Wars.

Diesel locomotives have less power compared to electric locomotives for the same weight and dimensions. For instance, the 2,200 kW of a modern British Rail Class 66 diesel locomotive was matched in 1927 by the electric SBB-CFF-FFS Ae 4/7 (2,300 kW), which is lighter. However, for low speeds, the tractive effort is more important than power. Diesel engines can be competitive for slow freight traffic (as it is common in Canada and the U.S.) but not for passenger or mixed passenger/freight traffic as on many European railway lines, especially where heavy freight trains must be run at comparatively high speeds (80 km/h or more).

These factors led to high degrees of electrification in most European countries. In some countries, such as Switzerland, even electric shunters are common and many private sidings are served by electric locomotives. During World War II, when materials to build new electric locomotives were not available, Swiss Federal Railways installed electric heating elements in the boilers of some steam shunters, fed from the overhead supply, to deal with the shortage of imported coal.

Recent political developments in many European countries to enhance public transit have led to another boost for electric traction. In addition, gaps in the unelectrified track are closed to avoid replacing electric locomotives by diesel for these sections. The necessary modernization and electrification of these lines are possible, due to the financing of the railway infrastructure by the state.

British electric multiple units were first introduced in the 1890s, and current versions provide public transit and there are also a number of electric locomotive classes, such as: Class 76, Class 86, Class 87, Class 90, Class 91 and Class 92.

=== Russia and former USSR ===
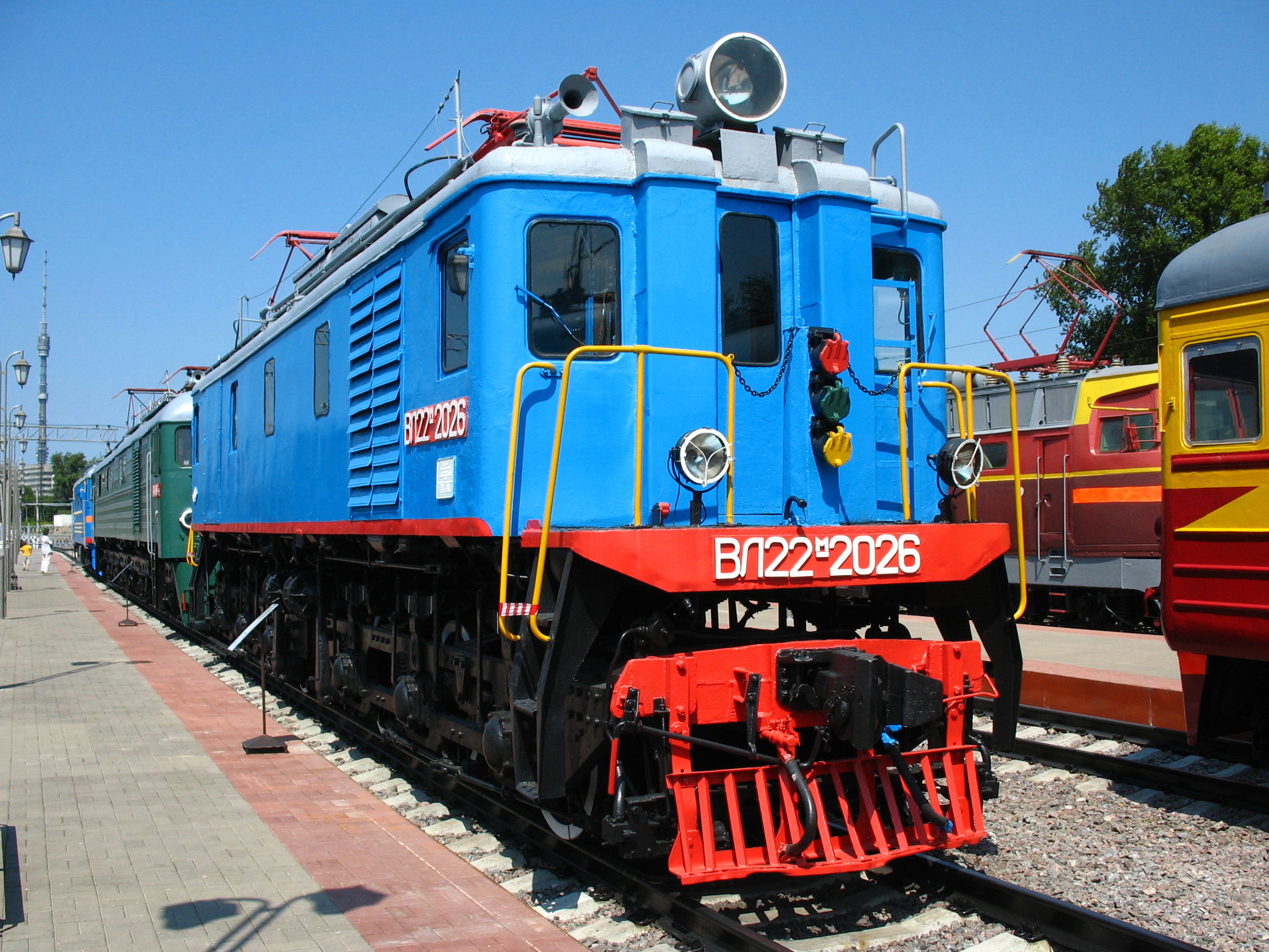
Early Soviet electric locomotive VL22^{m} (ВЛ22^{м})

Soviet electric locomotive VL60^{k} (ВЛ60^{к})

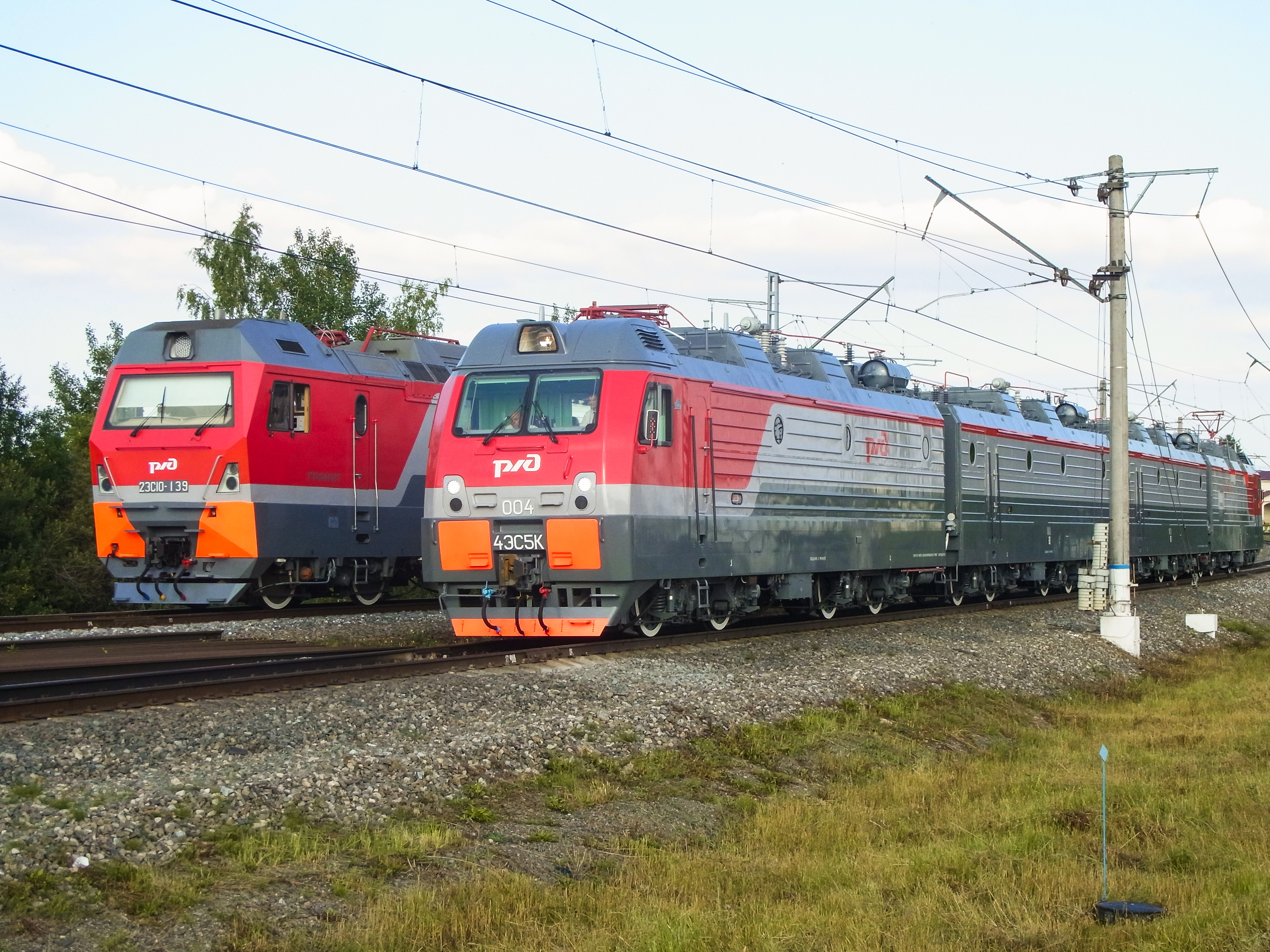
Russia's most powerful freight electric locomotives: 3ES10 (for 3 kV DC, 12,600 kW) and 4ES5K (for 25 kV AC, 12,240 kW)

Russia and other countries of the former Soviet Union have a mix of 3,000 V DC and 25 kV AC for historical reasons.

The special "junction stations" (around 15 over the former USSR – Vladimir, Mariinsk near Krasnoyarsk, etc.) have wiring switchable from DC to AC. Locomotive replacement is essential at these stations and is performed together with the contact wiring switching.

Most Soviet, Czech (the USSR ordered passenger electric locomotives from Škoda), Russian and Ukrainian locomotives can operate on AC or DC only. For instance, VL80 is an AC machine, with VL10 a DC version. There were some half-experimental small series such as VL82, which could switch from AC to DC and were used in small amounts around the city of Kharkiv in Ukraine, where is no junction station at many lines. Also, the latest Russian passenger locomotive EP20 and its half-experimental predecessor EP10 are a dual system.

Historically, 3,000 V DC was used for simplicity. The first experimental track was in the Georgian mountains, then the suburban zones of the largest cities were electrified for EMUs – very advantageous due to the much better dynamic of such a train compared to the steam one, which is important for suburban service with frequent stops. Then the large mountain line between Ufa and Chelyabinsk was electrified.

For some time, electric railways were only considered to be suitable for suburban or mountain lines. In around 1950, a decision was made (according to legend, by Joseph Stalin) to electrify the highly loaded plain prairie line of Omsk-Novosibirsk. After this, electrifying the major railroads at 3,000 V DC became mainstream.

25 kV AC started in the USSR in around 1960 when the industry managed to build the rectifier-based AC-wire DC-motor locomotive (all Soviet and Czech AC locomotives were such; only the post-Soviet ones switched to electronically controlled induction motors). The first major line with AC power was Mariinsk-Krasnoyarsk-Tayshet-Zima; the lines in European Russia such as Moscow-Rostov-on-Don followed.

In the 1990s, some DC lines were rebuilt as AC to allow the usage of the huge 10 MW AC locomotive of VL85. The line around Irkutsk is one of them. The DC locomotives freed by this rebuild were transferred to the St Petersburg region.

The Trans-Siberian Railway has been partly electrified since 1929, entirely since 2002. The system is 25 kV AC 50 Hz after the junction station of Mariinsk near Krasnoyarsk, 3,000 V DC before it, and train weights are up to 6,000 tonnes.

=== North America ===
==== Canada ====
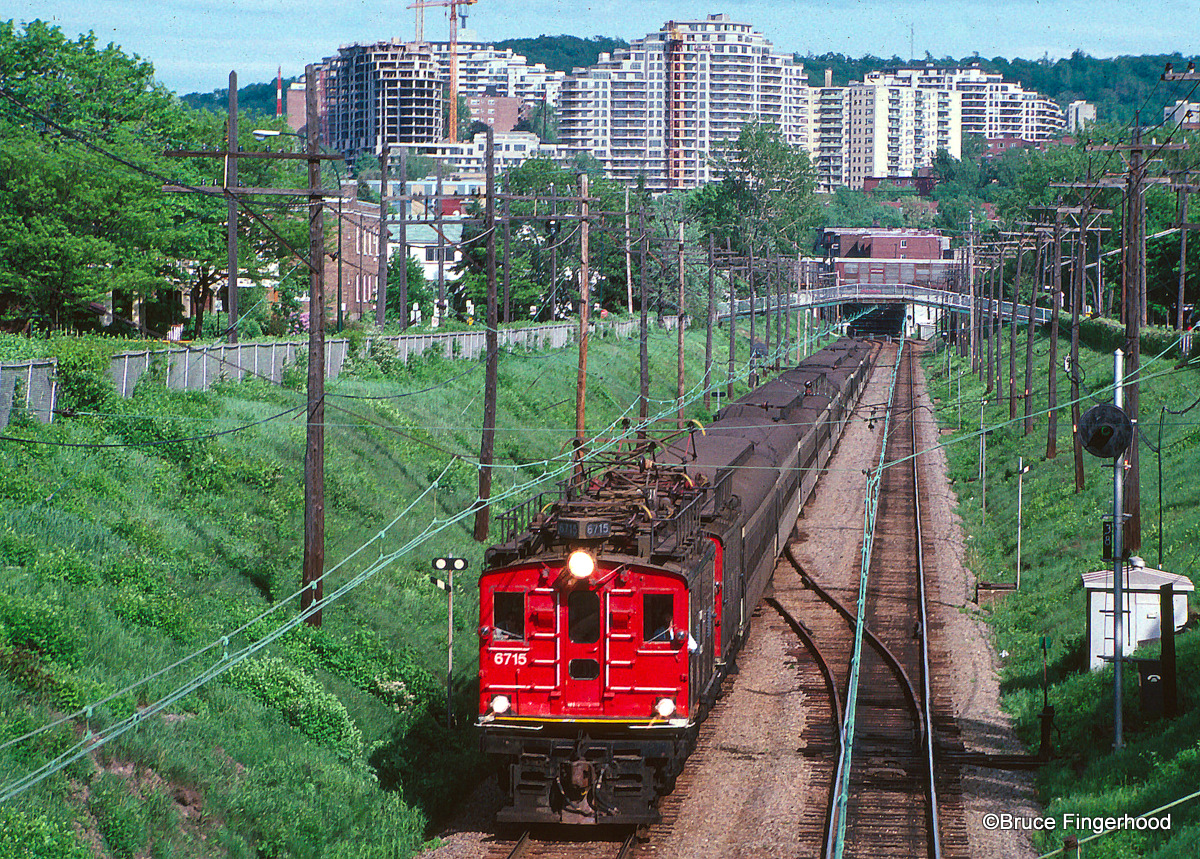
CN Boxcab Electric locomotive leaving Mount Royal Tunnel, in 1989

Historically, Canada has used a variety of electric locomotives, primarily for moving passengers and cargo through poorly ventilated tunnels. Electric locomotives that were in use in Canada include the St. Clair Tunnel Co. Boxcab Electric, CN Boxcab Electric, and GMD GF6C. Exo in Montreal operated ALP-45DP dual-mode electro-diesel locomotives in order to allow the locomotives to traverse the poorly ventilated Mount Royal Tunnel. The locomotives run in electric mode along the entire length of the Deux-Montagnes line and along the Mascouche line between Montreal Central Station and Ahuntsic station. The locomotives run in diesel mode for the remainder of the Mascouche line and along three other non-electrified lines. However, with the conversion of the Mount Royal Tunnel into the mainline of the Réseau express métropolitain light metro system and the permanent truncation of the Mascouche line to Ahuntsic station starting in January 2020, the locomotives are run exclusively in diesel mode.

Similar to the US the flexibility of diesel locomotives and the relatively low cost of their infrastructure has led them to prevail except where legal or operational constraints dictate the use of electricity. Leading to limited electric railway infrastructure and by extension electric locomotives operating in Canada today. As of 2021, only one example exists today, GMD SW1200MG electric locomotives operated by the Iron Ore Company of Canada for a small isolated railway hauling raw ore from their Carol Lake mine to a processing plant.

In the future Toronto's GO Transit plans to operate a fleet of new electric locomotives as a part of its Regional Express Rail initiative. The feasibility of using hydrogen fuel-cell locomotives is also being studied.

==== United States ====
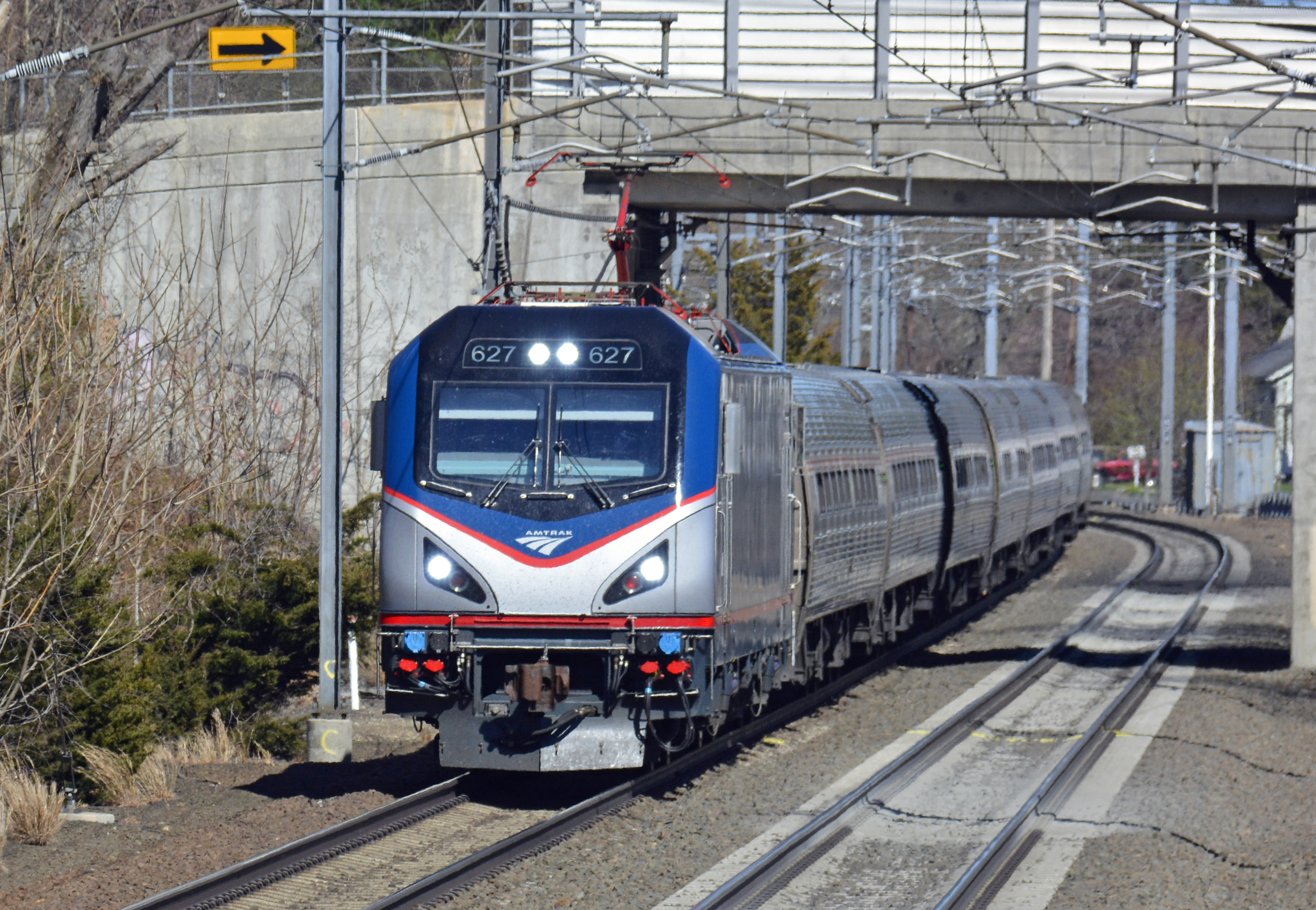
A Siemens ACS-64

Electric locomotives are used for passenger trains on Amtrak's Northeast Corridor between Washington, DC, and Boston, with a branch to Harrisburg, Pennsylvania, and on some commuter rail lines. Mass transit systems and other electrified commuter lines use electric multiple units, where each car is powered. All other long-distance passenger service and, with rare exceptions, all freight is hauled by diesel–electric locomotives.

In North America, the flexibility of diesel locomotives and the relatively low cost of their infrastructure have led them to prevail except where legal or operational constraints dictate the use of electricity. An example of the latter is the use of electric locomotives by Amtrak and commuter railroads in the Northeast Corridor. Amtrak and New Jersey Transit's Northeast Corridor services use electric locomotives, due to the prohibition on diesel operation in Penn Station and the Hudson and East River Tunnels leading to it. Some other trains to Penn Station use dual-mode locomotives that can also operate off third-rail power in the tunnels and the station.

During the steam era, some mountainous areas were electrified but these have been discontinued. The junction between electrified and non-electrified territory is the locale of engine changes; thus Northeast Corridor trains that extend south of Washington, D.C., change locomotives there. Northeast Corridor trains used to make lengthy stops in New Haven, Connecticut, as locomotives were swapped, a delay which contributed to the decision to electrify the New Haven to Boston segment of the Northeast Corridor in 2000.

=== Asia ===
China Railways HXD3D

==== China ====
China has over 100,000 km (62,000 mi) of electrified railway. With most trunk line freight and long-distance passenger trains operated using high power electric locomotives, typically in excess of 7,200 kilowatts (9,700 hp) of power output. Heavy freight is hauled with extremely high power multi-section locomotives, reaching up to 28,800 kilowatts (38,600 hp) on the "Shen 24" series of six section electric locomotives.

==== India ====
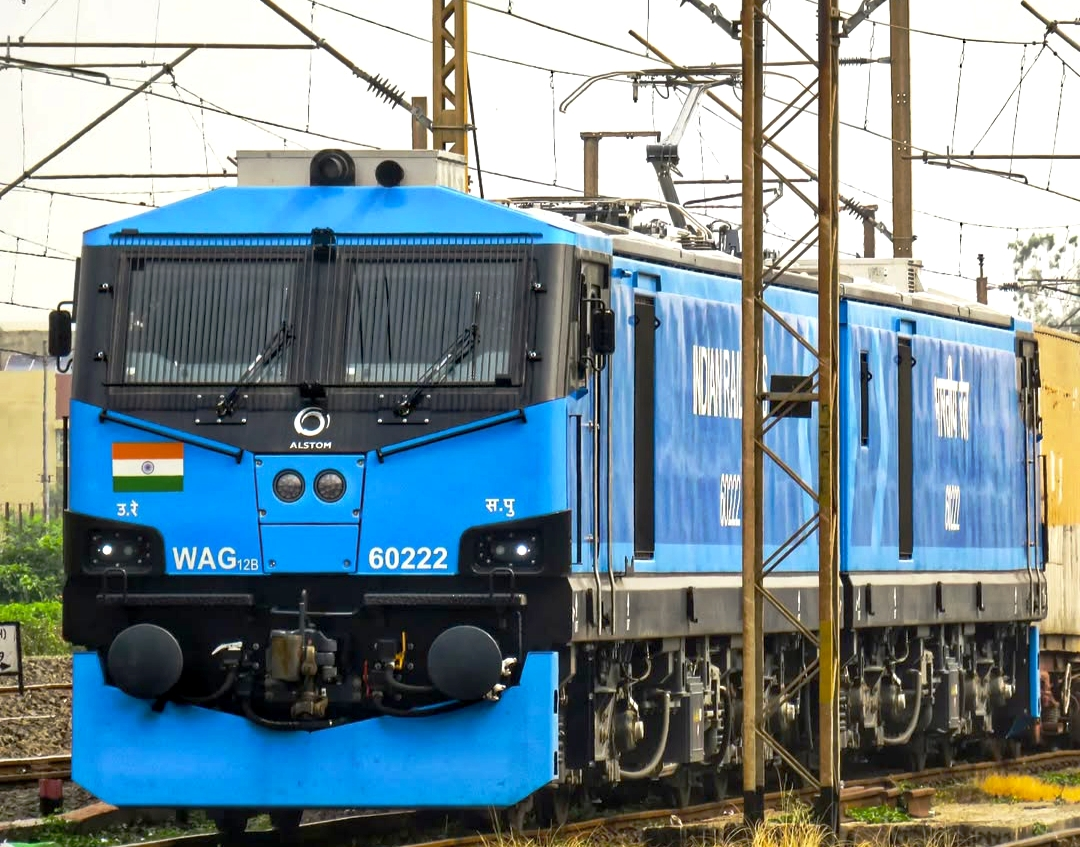
WAG-12B hauling a freight train

The mainline electrified routes in India utilize 25 kV AC overhead electrification at 50 Hz. As of October 2025, about 69,315 km (43,070 mi) (99.1%) of the Indian broad gauge network has been electrified.

The first electric train was introduced in 1925 and ran on 2,400 hp (1,800 kW) on 1500 V DC traction. In 1927, the first electric locomotive hauled passenger train was pulled by an imported WCP-1. In 1957, the Indian Railways adopted 25 kV 50 Hz AC traction with the first runs beginning in December 1959 with the WAM-1 locomotives.

Electric locomotives are manufactured by four state owned companies–Chittaranjan Locomotive Works, Banaras Locomotive Works, BHEL, and Patiala Locomotive Works. Locomotives are also manufactured at Electric Locomotive Factory, Madhepura, which is jointly owned with Alstom. The state owned Integral Coach Factory designs and manufactures self-propelled electric multiple units. The Indian Railways operates a mix of dedicated passenger, freight, and hybrid locomotives. As of October 2025, Indian Railways had 13,035 electric locomotives.

==== Japan ====
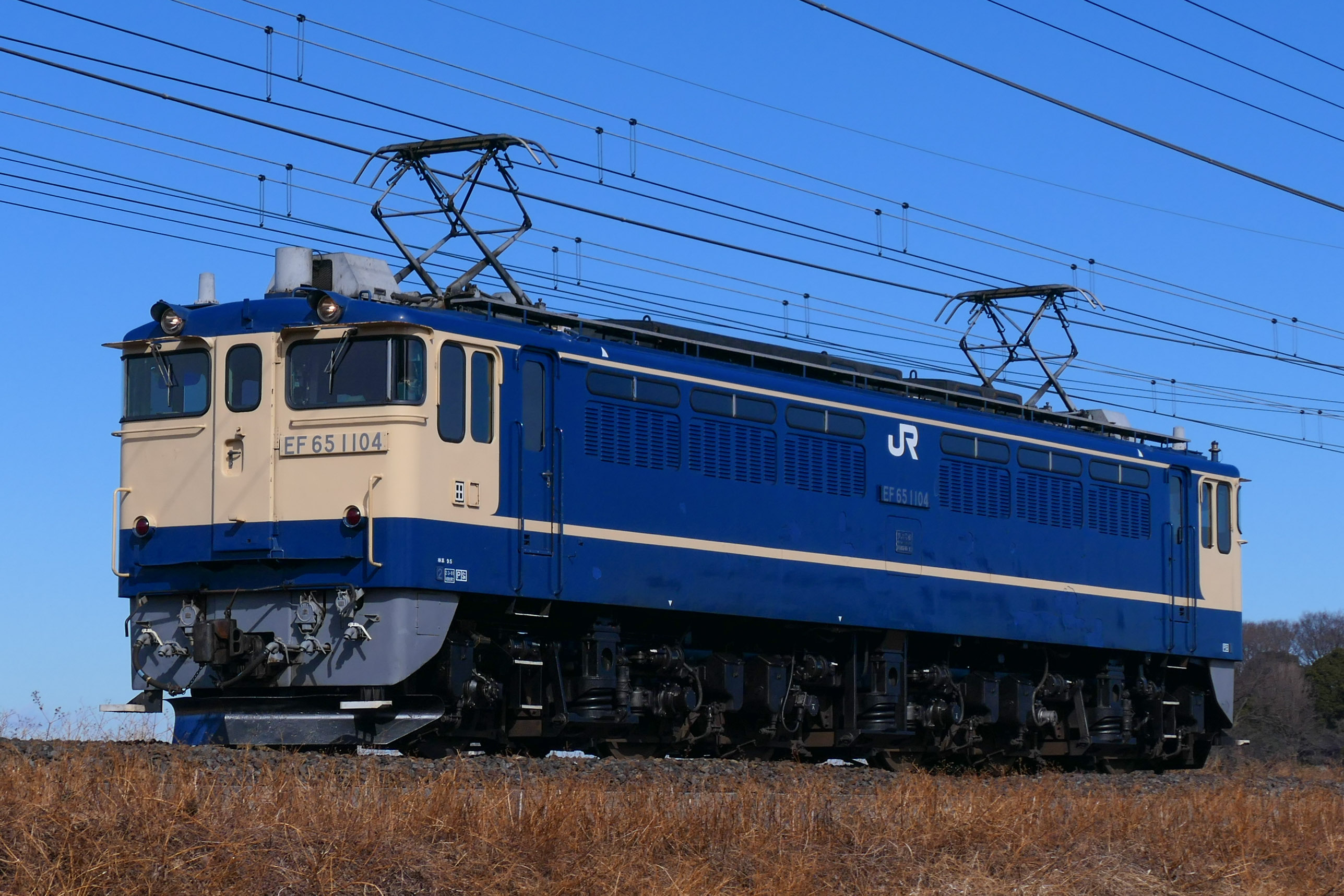
Japan electric locomotive EF65

Japan has come close to complete electrification largely due to the relatively short distances and mountainous terrain, which make electric service a particularly economical investment. Additionally, the mix of freight to passenger service is weighted much more toward passenger service (even in rural areas) than in many other countries, and this has helped drive government investment into the electrification of many remote lines. However, these same factors lead operators of Japanese railways to prefer EMUs over electric locomotives. The vast majority of electric passenger service in Japan is operated with EMUs, relegating electric locomotives to freight and select long-distance services.

=== Australia ===
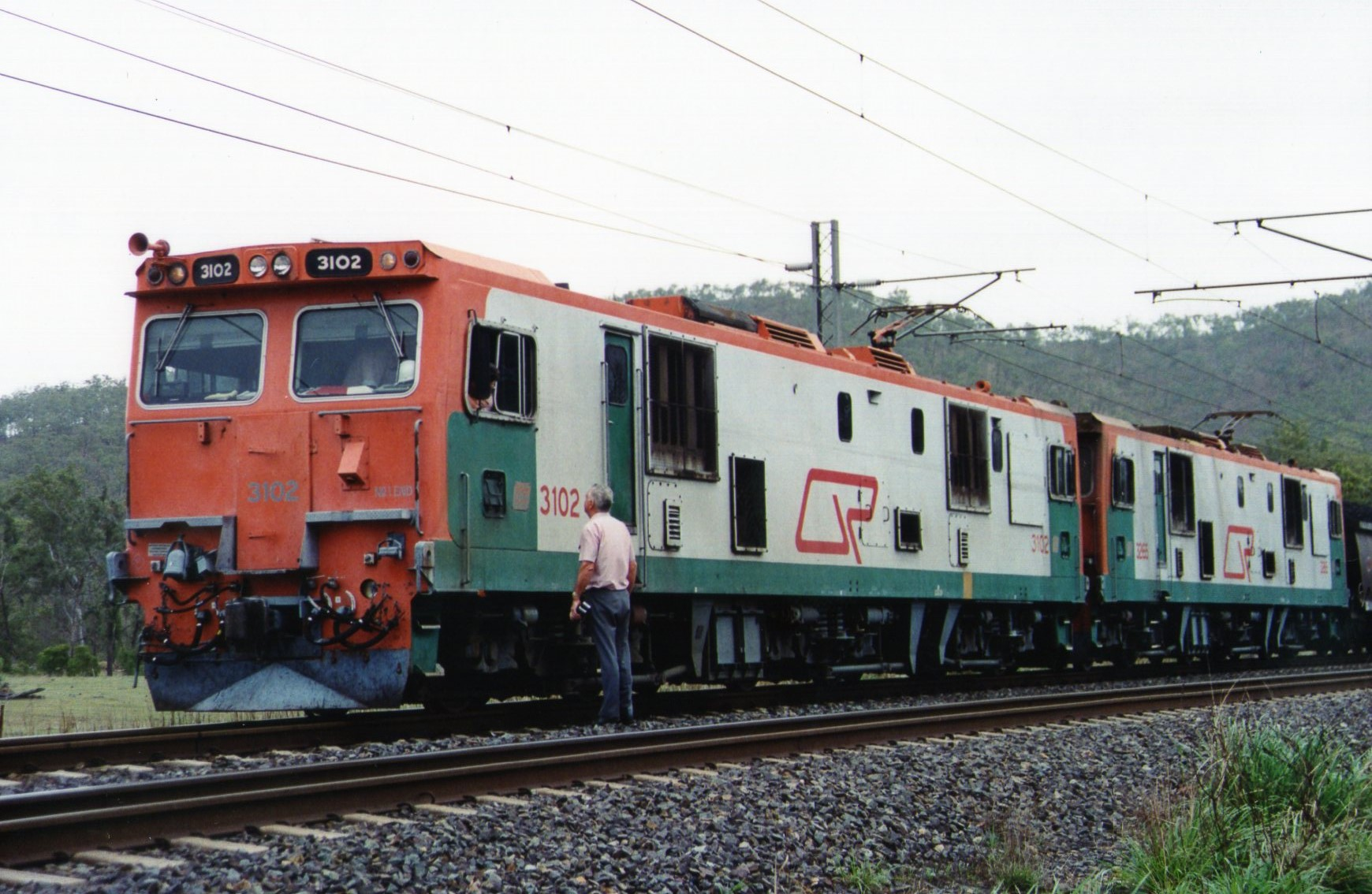
Queensland Railways 3100/3200 class

The Victorian Railways and New South Wales Government Railways, which pioneered electric traction in Australia in the early 20th century and continue to operate 1,500 V DC electric multiple units, have withdrawn their electric locomotives.

In both states, the use of electric locomotives on principal interurban routes proved to be a qualified success. In Victoria, because only the Gippsland line was electrified, the economic advantages of electric traction were not fully realized due to the need to change locomotives for trains that ran beyond the electrified network. The Victorian Railways L class were withdrawn from service by 1987, and the Gippsland line electrification had been dismantled by 2004.

The New South Wales 86 class locomotives introduced to NSW in 1983 had a relatively short life because the cost of maintaining the infrastructure, the need to change locomotives at the extremities of the electrified network, and higher charges levied for electricity, saw diesel locomotives take over services the electrified network.

Queensland Rail implemented electrification in the 1980s and utilises the more recent 25 kV AC technology with around 1,000 km of the narrow gauge network now electrified. It operates a fleet of electric locomotives to transport coal for export, the most recent of which the 3,000 kW (4,020 HP) 3300/3400 class.

== See also ==
- Air brake (rail)
- Baldwin-Westinghouse electric locomotives
- Battery powered railcars
- Boxcab
- Charles Grafton Page – electrical pioneer
- Electric multiple unit
- Electric–steam locomotives
- Electric vehicle battery
- Emily Davenport – electric locomotive pioneer
- Heilmann locomotive
- Hybrid train
- Railway brakes
- Railway electrification system
- Tram

== Sources ==
- Duffy, Michael C. (2003). Electric railways, 1880–1990. Stevenage, England: The Institution of Engineering and Technology (IET). ISBN 978-0-85296-805-5.
- Haut, F.J.G. (1952). The Early History of the Electric Locomotive. Richard Tilling for the author. ASIN B0007JJNNE.
- Haut, F.J.G. (1969). The History of the Electric Locomotive. London: George Allen and Unwin Ltd. ISBN 978-0-04-385042-8.
- Haut, F.J.G. (1970). The Pictorial History of Electric Locomotives (1st ed.). Oak Tree Publications. ISBN 978-0-498-07644-2.
- Haut, F.J.G. (1970). A History of the Electric Locomotive, Volume Two (1st ed.). South Brunswick, NJ: A.S. Barnes & Co. ISBN 978-0-498-02466-5.
- Haut, F.J.G. (1977). Electric locomotives of the World. Barton. ISBN 978-0-85153-256-1.
- Haut, F.J.G. (1981). A History of the Electric Locomotive. Volume 2. A.S. Barnes & Co. ASIN B000RAWB64.
- Haut, F.J.G. (1987). A History of the Electric Locomotive, Vol. 2: Railcars and the Industrial Locomotive. A.S. Barnes & Co. ISBN 978-0-498-02466-5.
