= GMD SW1200MG =

Type and origin
- Power type: Electric
- Builder: General Motors Diesel
- Serial number: A1945–A1949, A2176, A2558–A2560
- Model: SW1200MG
- Build date: 1963 (5), 1968 (1), 1971 (3)
- Total produced: 9
Specifications
- Configuration
  - AAR: B-B
  - UIC: Bo′Bo′
- Electric system/s: 2400 V AC 60 Hz catenary
- Current pickup(s): Pantograph
Career
- Operators: Iron Ore Company of Canada
- Numbers: 431501–431509
- Locale: Labrador City
- Disposition: Still in service

The GMD SW1200MG is a 4-axle electric locomotive built by General Motors Diesel between 1963 and 1971. The locomotive is the electric version of the diesel powered SW1200, with the prime mover replaced by a motor-generator set, hence the MG suffix in the model number.

Locomotives run under 2400V 60 Hz, in automatic control without driver. The difference with SW1200 is that a single-phase electric motor is provided in place of the diesel engine, with adapted control.

Nine examples of this locomotive were built for a single Canadian customer – Iron Ore Company of Canada (IOC).

== See also ==
- List of GMD Locomotives
