= List of Saskatchewan municipal roads (600–699) =

The following is a list of rural municipality highways in the Canadian province of Saskatchewan between the numbers 600 and 699. The 600-series highways run north and south and, generally, the last two digits increase from east to west. Many of these highways are gravel for some of their length.

== SK 600 ==
Highway 600
- Location: Argyle No. 1, Storthoaks No. 31, Antler No. 61, Maryfield No. 91, Moosomin No. 121, Rocanville No. 151, Spy Hill No. 152
- Length: 187.0 km (116.2 mi)

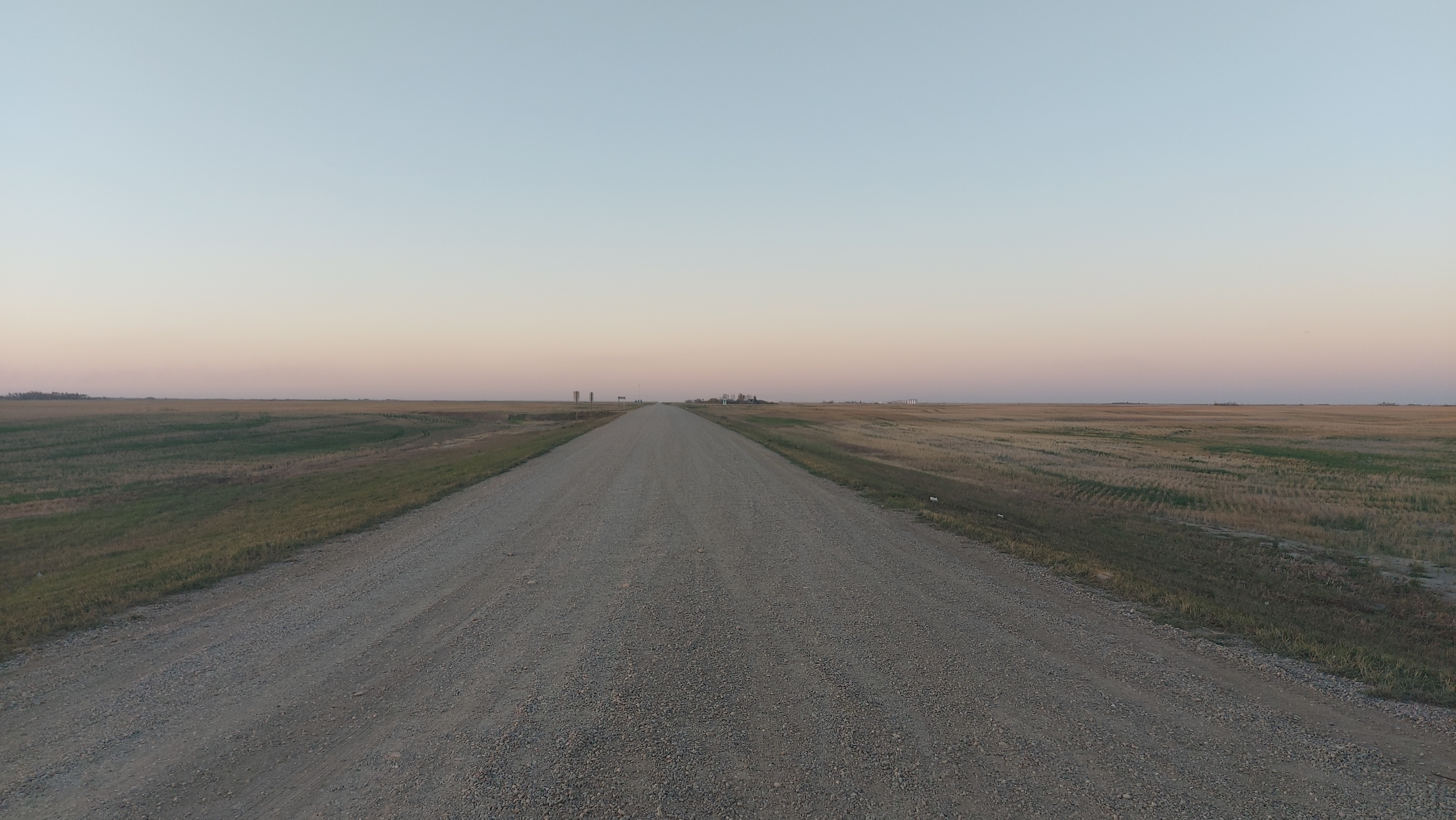
Highway 600

Highway 600 runs from Highway 18 near Gainsborough to Highway 8 at Spy Hill. Highway 600 is about 187 kilometres (116 mi) long, with portions of the highway being both paved or gravel.

Hwy 600 begins in the Rural Municipality of Argyle No. 1 at an intersection with Hwy 18 along the eastern outskirts of Gainsborough, heading north as a paved two-lane highway for couple kilometres, where it crosses Gainsborough Creek, before reverting to gravel as it heads due northward through rural farmland for several kilometres. Entering the Rural Municipality of Storthoaks No. 31, the highway shares a short concurrency (overlap) with Hwy 361 westbound as it passes through the hamlet of Fertile on its way to enter the Rural Municipality of Antler No. 61 and pass through hamlet of Antler, where it crosses a former Canadian Pacific Railway line and shares a short concurrency with westbound Hwy 13 (Red Coat Trail).

Hwy 600 continues on northward through rural farmland into the Rural Municipality of Maryfield No. 91, travelling along the eastern side of the village of Maryfield, where it crosses both Canadian National Railway's Cromer subdivision and Hwy 48, before winding its way through some switchbacks to cross Pipestone Creek before entering the Rural Municipality of Moosomin No. 121 at the town of Fleming, where it crosses both the Trans-Canada Highway (Hwy 1) and Canadian Pacific Railway's Broadview subdivision. Traversing rural areas, the highway has an intersection with the east end of Hwy 709, as well as crossing Hwy 703, on its way to pass through west side of the village of Welwyn, where it crosses both Canadian Pacific Railway's Rocanville subdivision and Hwy 308.

Immediately entering the Rural Municipality of Rocanville No. 151, Hwy 600 travels past Welwyn Centennial Regional Park before curving westward, travelling several kilometres to the south of Ste-Marthe-Rocanville to enter the northeastern corner of the town of Rocanville, where it makes a sharp right onto a paved, two-lane highway. Crossing the Rocanville subdivision a couple more times, the highway heads northeast for several kilometres to the Rocanville Mine, where it makes a sudden left turn onto a gravel road, winding its way past the access road for the Fort Espérance National Historic Site before crossing a bridge over Qu'Appelle River into the Rural Municipality of Spy Hill No. 152.

After a few kilometres, the highway regains asphalt for the final time as it crosses the Canadian National Railway's Rivers subdivision and curves northwest to pass through the locality of Welby. After traversing a mix of farmland and wooded areas for a few more kilometres, Hwy 600 enters the village of Spy Hill and travels through the southern part of town along First Avenue, where it comes to and end at an intersection with Hwy 8. The entire length of Hwy 600 never strays farther than 15 kilometres (9.3 mi) from the Manitoba border.

=== Major intersections ===
From south to north:

Rural municipality	Location	km	mi	Destinations	Notes
Argyle No. 1	Gainsborough	0.0	0.0	Highway 18 – Gainsborough, Pierson	Southern terminus; southern end of paved section
Argyle No. 1		1.0	0.62	Bridge over Gainsborough Creek	
Argyle No. 1		1.7	1.1	Northern end of paved section at Township Road 31	
Storthoaks No. 31	Fertile	23.0	14.3	Highway 361 east – Tilston	Southern end of Hwy 361 concurrency
Storthoaks No. 31	Fertile	24.7	15.3	Highway 361 west – Storthoaks	Northern end of Hwy 361 concurrency
Storthoaks No. 31		34.3	21.3	Southern end of paved section	
Storthoaks No. 31 – Antler No. 61 boundary		41.1	25.5	Northern end of paved section at Township Road 70	
Antler No. 61	Antler	45.0	28.0	Souris Avenue – Antler	
Antler No. 61	Antler	45.2	28.1	Railway Avenue – Antler	
Antler No. 61		46.1	28.6	Highway 13 east (Red Coat Trail) – Sinclair, Reston	Southern end of both Hwy 13 concurrency and paved section
Antler No. 61		51.0	31.7	Highway 13 west (Red Coat Trail) – Redvers	Northern end of both Hwy 13 concurrency and paved section
Maryfield No. 91	Maryfield	81.3	50.5	Highway 48 – Fairlight, Kola	
Maryfield No. 91		94.6	58.8	Bridge over Pipestone Creek	
Moosomin No. 121	Fleming	107.7	66.9	Highway 1 (TCH) – Moosomin, Elkhorn	
Moosomin No. 121		116.0	72.1	Highway 709 west – Moosomin	Eastern terminus of Hwy 709
Moosomin No. 121		125.9	78.2	Highway 703 – Wapella, McAuley	
Moosomin No. 121 – Rocanville No. 151	Welwyn	135.8	84.4	Highway 308 – Rocanville, St. Lazare	
Rocanville No. 151		137.0	85.1	Welwyn Centennial Regional Park access road	
Rocanville No. 151		143.9	89.4	Range Road 1303 – Ste-Marthe-Rocanville	Former Hwy 600 north
Rocanville No. 151	Rocanville	153.7	95.5	Range Road 1313 to Highway 8 south – Moosomin Township Road 164 to Highway 8 north / Highway 719 – Rocanville, Spy Hill	Hwy 600 makes a right onto Range Road 1313; southern end of paved section
Rocanville No. 151		162.7	101.1	Township Road 172 to PR 545 east – St. Lazare	
Rocanville No. 151		167.1	103.8	Range Road 1304 / Rocanville mine main entrance	Hwy 600 makes a left onto Range Road 1304; northern end of paved section; former Hwy 600 south
Rocanville No. 151		168.8	104.9	Fort Espérance National Historic Site access road	
Rocanville No. 151, Spy Hill No. 152 boundary		169.3	105.2	Bridge over the Qu'Appelle River	
Spy Hill No. 152		171.5	106.6	Southern end of paved section	
Spy Hill No. 152	Spy Hill	187.0	116.2	Highway 8 – Rocanville, Langenburg	Northern terminus
1.000 mi = 1.609 km; 1.000 km = 0.621 mi

== SK 601 ==
Highway 601
- Location: Enniskillen No. 3, Mount Pleasant No. 2, Moose Creek No. 33, Reciprocity No. 32, Antler No. 61, Walpole No. 92, Martin No. 122, Rocanville No. 151, Willowdale No. 153
- Length: 208 km (129 mi)

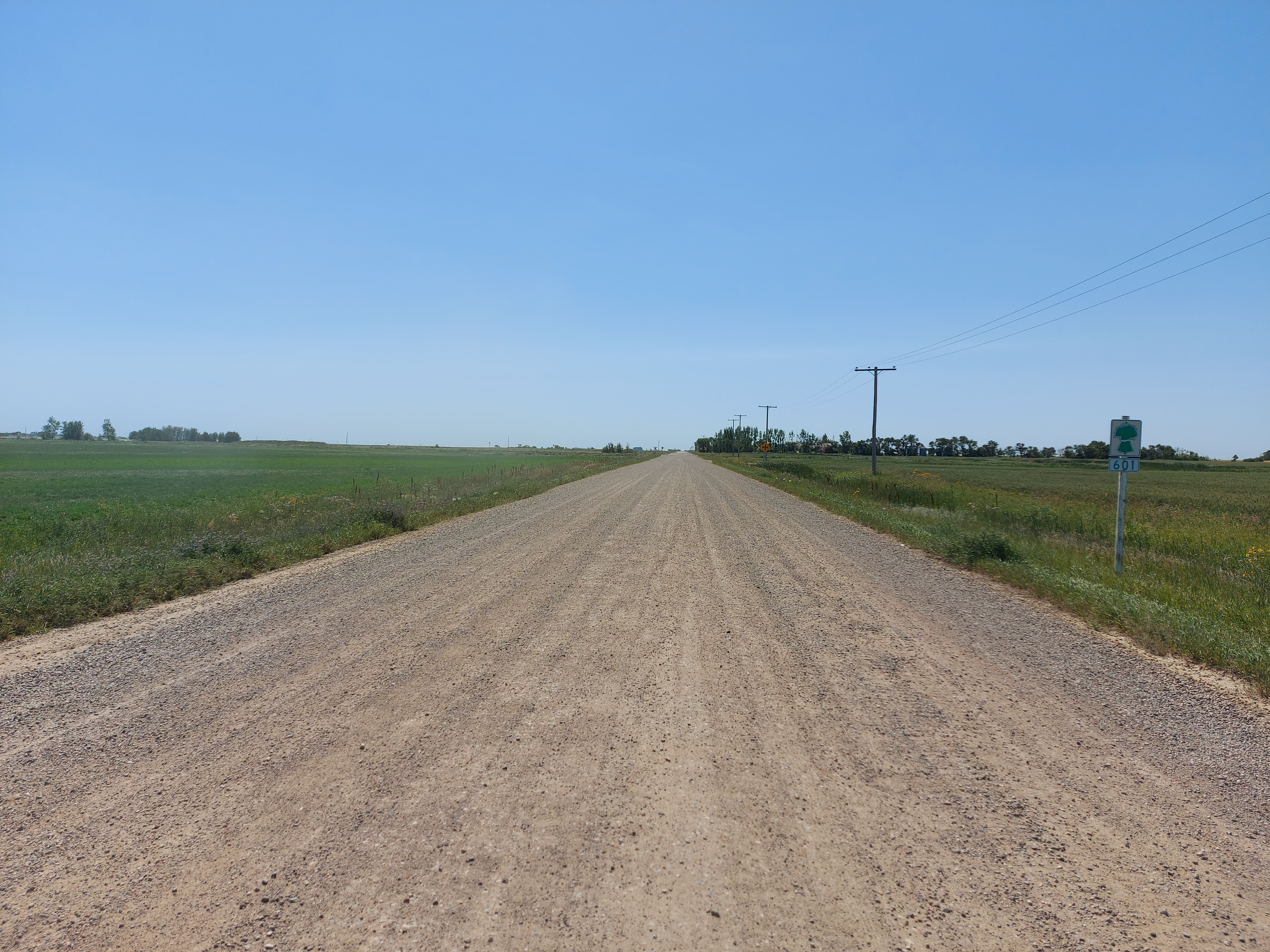
Highway 601 near Glen Ewen in the RM of Enniskillen No. 3

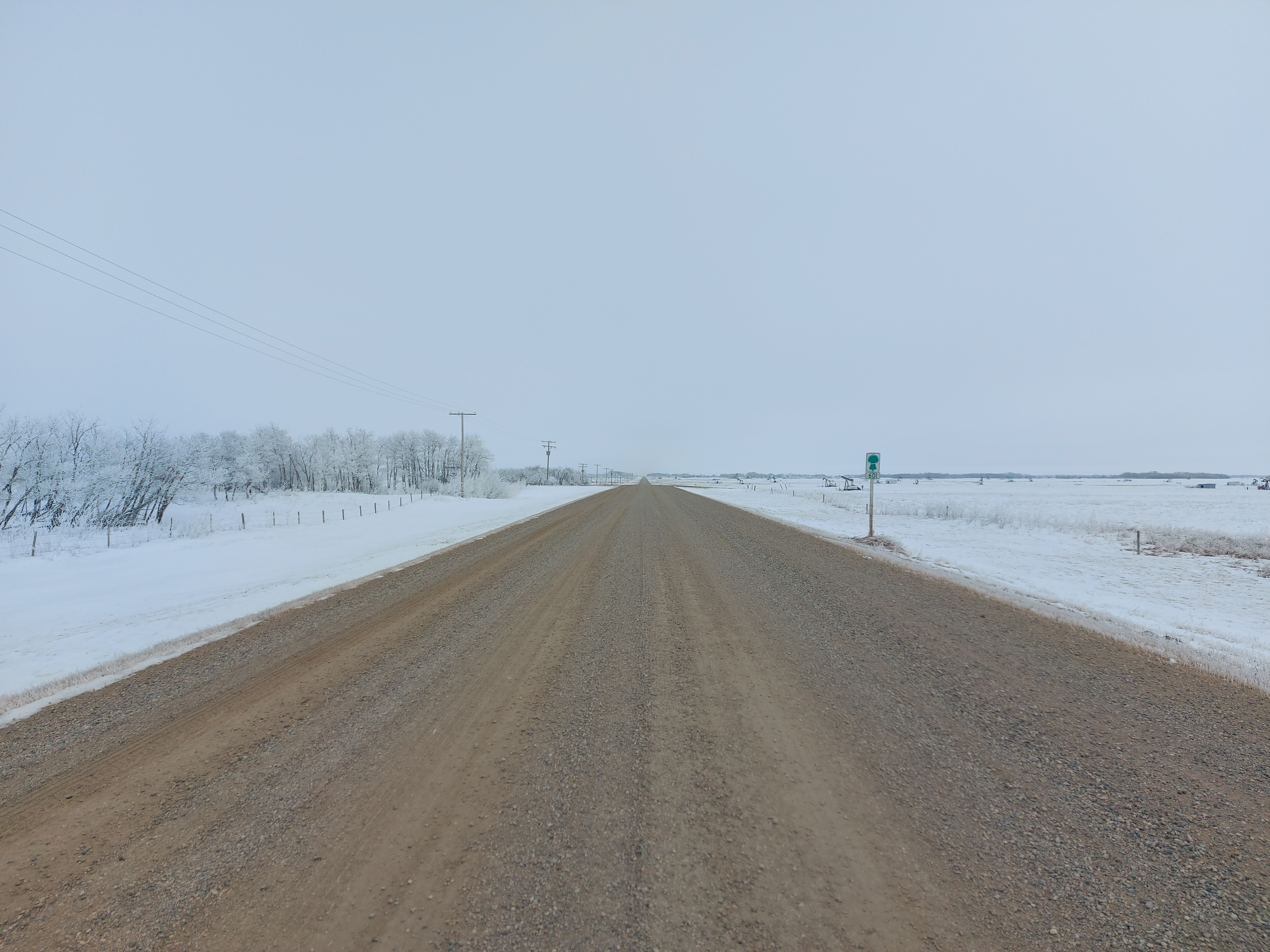
Highway 601 near Wauchope

Highway 601 runs from Highway 9 (Saskota Flyway) north of Whitewood south to Highway 603 south of Oxbow. It is about 208 kilometres (129 mi) long.

Hwy 601 begins within the Rural Municipality of Enniskillen No. 3 at an intersection with Hwy 603 south of Oxbow, just 5 kilometres (3.1 mi) north of the United States border. It heads east as a gravel two-lane road along Township Road 13 for a few kilometres before curving onto Range Road 2011, heading due northward through rural farmland to cross the Souris River and travel through the western and northern sides of the village of Glen Ewen, where it crosses Canadian Pacific Railway's Estevan subdivision and shares a short concurrency (overlap) with eastbound Hwy 18. The highway heads north along the borders with Mount Pleasant No. 2 and Moose Creek No. 33 before curving eastward into the Rural Municipality of Reciprocity No. 32.

Hwy 601 makes a sudden sharp left onto Range Road 1341, crossing the Antler River twice as it becomes concurrent with eastbound Hwy 361, with the pair travelling to the south of Cantal to enter the village of Alida. With the highway gaining asphalt as it travels through the northern part of town, the pair split, with Hwy 601 heading north out of town through rural farmland to traverse a switchback before crossing the Antler River once again and enter the Rural Municipality of Antler No. 61. After several kilometres of rural farmland, it crosses a small creek before passing the hamlet of Wauchope, where it crosses a former railway line and has a short concurrency with westbound Hwy 13 (Red Coat Trail / Ghost Town Trail). With the asphalt reverting to gravel here, Hwy 601 continues through rural areas to enter the Rural Municipality of Walpole No. 92 at the hamlet of Parkman.

The highway traverses a switchback as it passes through the northern part of the hamlet, crossing Canadian National Railway's Lampman subdivision before winding its way northeast across several small creeks to have a short concurrency with westbound Hwy 48 halfway between the town of Wawota and the hamlet of Walpole. It now winds its way northwest through several switchbacks for several kilometres to the hamlet of Kelso, where it crosses Canadian National Railway's Cromer subdivision, before entering the Rural Municipality of Martin No. 122. Hwy 601 travels due north through a mix of farmland and wooded areas, crossing Hwy 709 and Pipestone Creek before becoming concurrent with eastbound Hwy 703 and entering the town of Wapella along Third Avenue.

The pair gain asphalt once again as they travel through neighbourhoods and cross a small stream before making a right onto S Railway Street in downtown. They then make a left onto Fifth Avenue and cross Canadian Pacific Railway's Broadview subdivision, travelling through more neighbourhoods to have a junction with the Trans-Canada Highway (Hwy 1) before Hwy 601 splits off and heads north out of town. Becoming a gravel road once again, the highway enters the Rural Municipality of Rocanville No. 151, travelling through rural farmland for several kilometres to have an intersection with Hwy 719 before making a sharp left onto Township Road 171, entering the Rural Municipality of Willowdale No. 153. Hwy 601 heads due westward through the localities of Clayridge, Forest Farm, and St. Luke, before coming to an end at an intersection with Hwy 9 (Saskota Flyway), with the road continuing west as Township Road 172.

=== Major intersections ===
From south to north:

Rural municipality	Location	km	mi	Destinations	Notes
Enniskillen No. 3		0.0	0.0	Highway 603 to Highway 9 – Port of Northgate, Oxbow	Southern terminus
Enniskillen No. 3		26.5	16.5	Bridge over the Souris River	
Enniskillen No. 3	Glen Ewen	29.8	18.5	Ewen Avenue – Glen Ewen	
Enniskillen No. 3	Glen Ewen	29.9	18.6	Highway 18 west – Oxbow	Southern end of both Hwy 18 concurrency and paved section
Enniskillen No. 3	Glen Ewen	31.6	19.6	Highway 18 east – Carnduff Range Road 1343 – Glen Ewen	Northern end of both Hwy 18 concurrency and paved section
Enniskillen No. 3 – Mount Pleasant No. 2 boundary	No major junctions				
Moose Creek No. 33 – Reciprocity No. 32 boundary	No major junctions				
Reciprocity No. 32		44.1	27.4	Bridge over the Antler River	
Reciprocity No. 32		52.7	32.7	Bridge over the Antler River	
Reciprocity No. 32		55.9	34.7	Highway 361 west – Lampman	Southern end of Hwy 361 concurrency
Reciprocity No. 32		57.6	35.8	Cantal Road (Range Road 1340) – Cantal	
Reciprocity No. 32		57.8	35.9	Bridge over the Antler River	
Reciprocity No. 32		61.1	38.0	Southern end of paved section at Range Road 1334	
Reciprocity No. 32	Alida	62.8	39.0	Highway 361 east to Highway 318 – Carnduff, Storthoaks	Northern end of Hwy 361 concurrency
Reciprocity No. 32		75.8	47.1	Bridge over the Antler River	
Antler No. 61	Wauchope	87.0	54.1	Highway 13 east (Red Coat Trail) – Redvers	Southern end of Hwy 13 concurrency
Antler No. 61	Wauchope	87.9	54.6	Plumer Street – Wauchope	
Antler No. 61	Wauchope	89.0	55.3	Highway 13 west (Red Coat Trail / Ghost Town Trail) – Manor	Northern end of both Hwy 13 concurrency and paved section
Walpole No. 92	Parkman	100.5	62.4	Railway Avenue – Parkman	
Walpole No. 92	Parkman	100.9	62.7	Bridge over the Antler River	
Walpole No. 92	Parkman	101.6	63.1	Railway Avenue – Parkman	
Walpole No. 92		121.3	75.4	Highway 48 east – Fairlight	Southern end of both Hwy 48 concurrency and paved section
Walpole No. 92		122.0	75.8	Highway 48 west – Wawota	Northern end of both Hwy 48 concurrency and paved section
Walpole No. 92	Kelso	134.6	83.6	Range Road 1334 – Kelso	
Martin No. 122		150.6	93.6	Highway 709 – Kipling, Moosomin	
Martin No. 122		153.5	95.4	Bridge over Pipestone Creek	
Martin No. 122		163.8	101.8	Highway 703 west – St. Hubert Mission	Southern end of Hwy 703 concurrency
Martin No. 122	Wapella	167.7	104.2	Southern end of paved section	
Martin No. 122	Wapella	168.9	104.9	Highway 1 (TCH) – Whitewood, Moosomin	
Martin No. 122	Wapella	169.3	105.2	Highway 703 east to Highway 8	Northern end of both Hwy 703 concurrency and paved section
Rocanville No. 151		182.4	113.3	Highway 719 east – Rocanville	Western terminus of eastern section of Hwy 719
Rocanville No. 151		187.3	116.4	Range Road 1333 – Hazel Cliffe	Hwy 601 makes a left onto Township Road 171
Willowdale No. 153		208.5	129.6	Highway 9 (Saskota Flyway) – Whitewood, Stockholm	Northern terminus; road continues west as Township Road 172
1.000 mi = 1.609 km; 1.000 km = 0.621 mi: Concurrency terminus

== SK 602 ==
Highway 602
- Poplar River Mine Road
- Location: Hart Butte No. 11, Bengough No. 40
- Length: 27.7 km (17.2 mi)

Hwy 602, also known as Poplar River Mine Road, runs from an intersection with Hwy 18 / Hwy 36 in the town of Coronach to Hwy 705 at the hamlet of Harptree. With portions of the highway both paved and gravel, it provides access to the Poplar River Coal Mine and runs through a portion of the Big Muddy Badlands. It is approximately 27.7-kilometre-long (17.2 mi).

Hwy 602 begins in the Rural Municipality of Hart Butte No. 11 at the town of Coronach at a junction with Hwy 18 / Hwy 36 on the north side of town. It heads east as a paved, two-lane highway, to cross the Fife Lake Railway and travel along the town's northern boundary. It meets a short spur road, Range Road 2271, connects to Hwy 18 / Hwy 36, before leaving the town and turning north along Range Road 2270. Travelling northward through rural farmland, it crosses both the Poplar River Mine Railway and the East Poplar River before making a sharp right onto Township Road 32, traveling east for around 0.5 kilometres (0.31 mi) before turning left, then right again in front of the Poplar River Mine office. The highway now turns to gravel as it winds its way around the mine for a few kilometres before crossing the Big Muddy Badlands into the Rural Municipality of Bengough No. 40, entering farmland again as it crosses a bridge over a small creek before coming to an end as it enters the hamlet of Harptree at an intersection with Hwy 705.

=== Major intersections ===
From south to north:

Rural municipality	Location	km	mi	Destinations	Notes
Hart Butte No. 11	Coronach	0.0	0.0	Highway 18 / Highway 36 – Willow Bunch, Rockglen, Coronach	Southern terminus; southern end of paved section; road continues west as Township Road 22
Hart Butte No. 11	Coronach	1.7	1.1	Range Road 2271 to Highway 18 / Highway 36 – Coronach, Port of Coronach, Big Beaver	Spur road to Hwy 18 / Hwy 36
Hart Butte No. 11		8.4	5.2	Bridge over the East Poplar River	
Hart Butte No. 11		14.5	9.0	Northern end of paved section at Poplar River Mine office	
Bengough No. 40	Harptree	27.7	17.2	Highway 705 – Willow Bunch, Bengough Range Road 2262 – Harptree	Northern terminus; road continues north as Range Road 2262
1.000 mi = 1.609 km; 1.000 km = 0.621 mi

== SK 603 ==
Highway 603
- Location: Enniskillen No. 3, Moose Creek No. 33, Moose Mountain No. 63, Wawken No. 93
- Length: 117 km (73 mi)

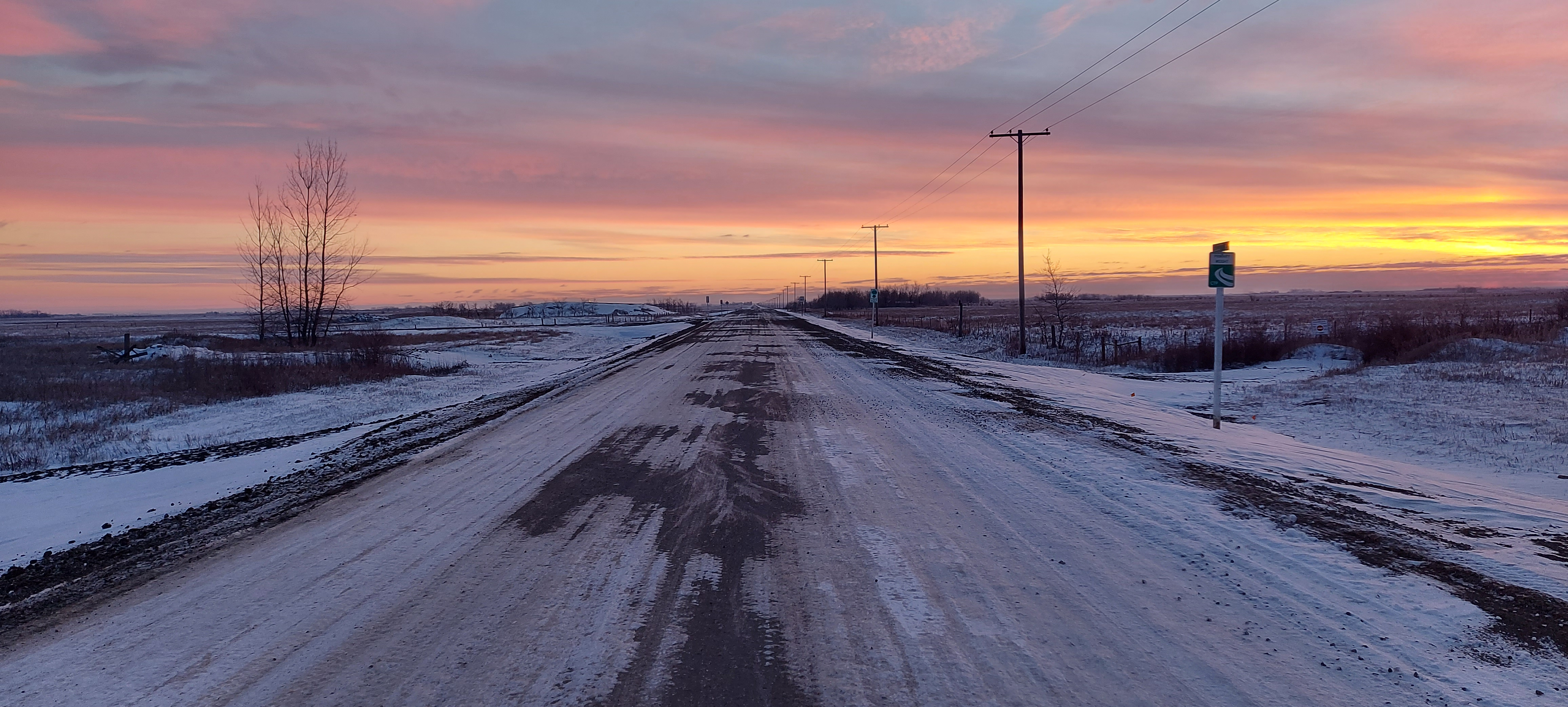
Southern terminus of Highway 603 at Highway 9, near Elcott. This section is known as Elcott Road.

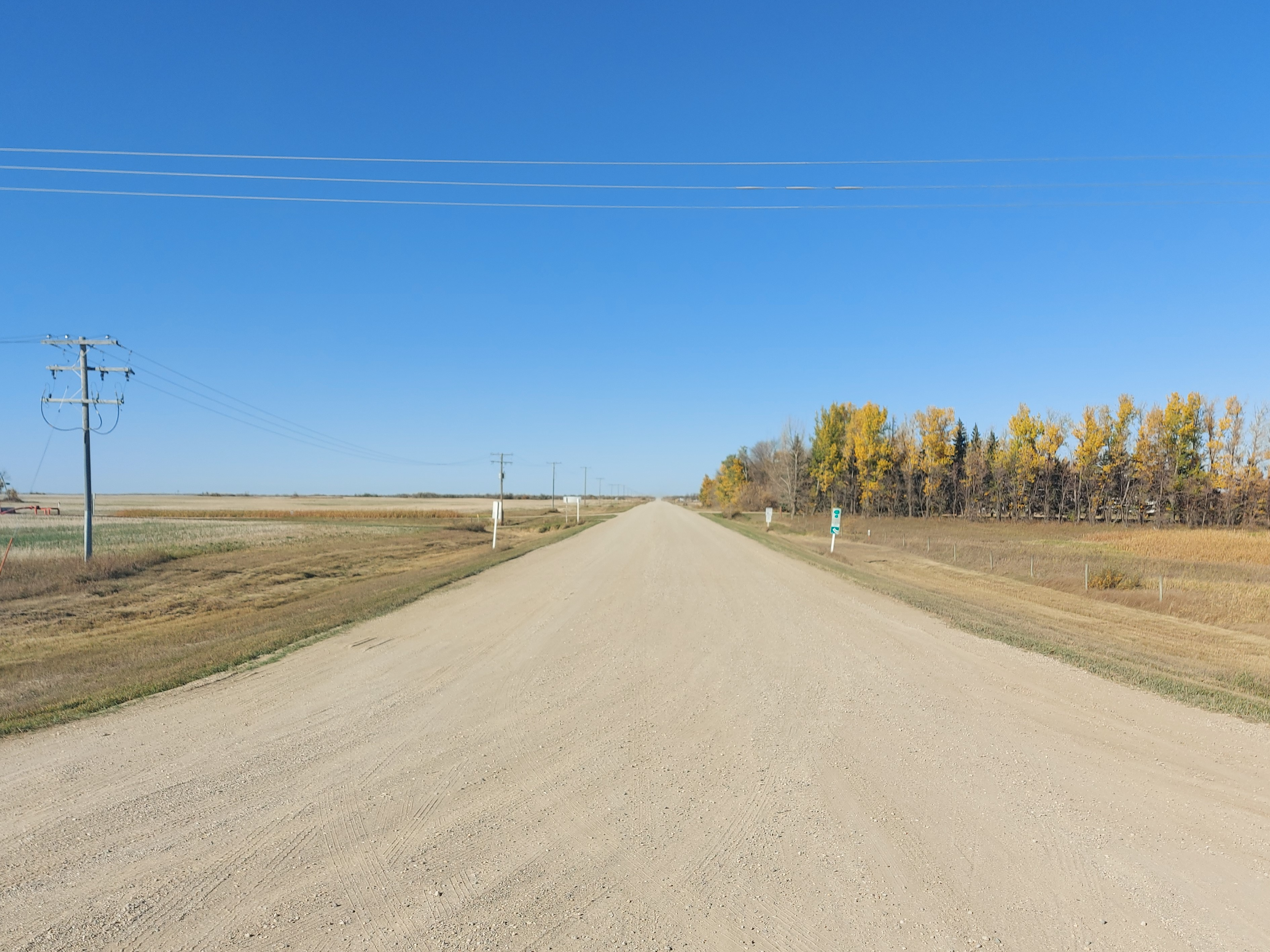
Highway 603, near Manor

Highway 603 runs from Highway 9 at Elcott to Highway 48 near Wawota. Highway 603 passes near the communities of Auburnton, Manor, and Service, as well as providing access to Cannington Manor Provincial Park. It is about 117 kilometres (73 mi) long.

Hwy 603 begins in the Rural Municipality of Enniskillen No. 3 at an intersection with Hwy 9 (Saskota Flyway) just north of Northgate, about 5 kilometres (3.1 mi) north of the United States border. It heads east along Elcott Road through rural farmland for few kilometres to the intersection with Hwy 601, where Hwy 603 makes a sharp left turn and heads north. The highway crosses the Souris River, entering the town of Oxbow along Marconi Road to pass by Bow Valley Park, and cross Canadian Pacific Railway's Estevan subdivision, before becoming concurrent (overlapped) with eastbound Hwy 18 and travelling through an industrial area. Entering downtown along Railway Avenue, the pair run parallel to the railway line as it forms the main thoroughfare through town, leaving downtown after several blocks and travelling through neighbourhoods for a few blocks to leave Oxbow altogether and head southeast through rural farmland. After a few kilometres, Hwy 603 splits off and heads north through rural areas to enter the Rural Municipality of Moose Creek No. 33, crossing Auburnton Creek several times as it passes through the hamlet of Auburnton, where it has an intersection with Hwy 361.

Entering the Rural Municipality of Moose Mountain No. 63, the highway travels along the eastern edge of the village of Manor, where it crosses Hwy 13 (Red Coat Trail / Ghost Town Trail), before travelling several kilometres to the east of both the Moose Mountain Upland and Cannington Lake to cross Canadian National Railway's Lampman subdivision and traverse a switchback, where it passes by Cannington Manor Provincial Park. Hwy 603 now enters the Rural Municipality of Wawken No. 93, crossing the Antler River and passing through rural farmland for several more kilometres before coming to an end as it enters the town of Wawota at a junction with Hwy 48, with the road continuing into downtown as Hall Street. With the exceptions of where it is concurrent with other highways, Hwy 603 is entirely a two-lane gravel road for its entire length.

=== Major intersections ===
From south to north:

Rural municipality	Location	km	mi	Destinations	Notes
Enniskillen No. 3	Elcott	0.0	0.0	Highway 9 (Saskota Flyway) – Port of Northgate, Alameda	Southern terminus
Enniskillen No. 3		8.1	5.0	Highway 601 north – Glen Ewen	Southern terminus of Hwy 601
Enniskillen No. 3	Oxbow	27.6	17.1	Bridge over the Souris River	
Enniskillen No. 3	Oxbow	29.0	18.0	Highway 18 west – Alameda, Frobisher	Southern end of Hwy 18 concurrency
Enniskillen No. 3		37.5	23.3	Highway 18 east – Glen Ewen	Northern end of Hwy 18 concurrency
Moose Creek No. 33	Auburnton	59.0	36.7	Highway 361 – Lampman, Alida	
Moose Mountain No. 63	Manor	80.8	50.2	Railway Avenue – Manor	
Moose Mountain No. 63	Manor	81.6	50.7	Highway 13 (Red Coat Trail / Ghost Town Trail)) – Carlyle, Wauchope	
Moose Mountain No. 63		94.6	58.8	Township Road 91 – Cannington Manor Provincial Park	
Wawken No. 93		107.7	66.9	Bridge over the Antler River	
Wawken No. 93	Wawota	117.0	72.7	Highway 48 – Moose Mountain Provincial Park, Maryfield Hall Street – Wawota	Northern terminus; road continues north as Hall Street
1.000 mi = 1.609 km; 1.000 km = 0.621 mi: Concurrency terminus

== SK 604 ==
Highway 604
- Location: Coalfields No. 4, Browning No. 34, Brock No. 64
- Length: 82.7 km (51.4 mi)

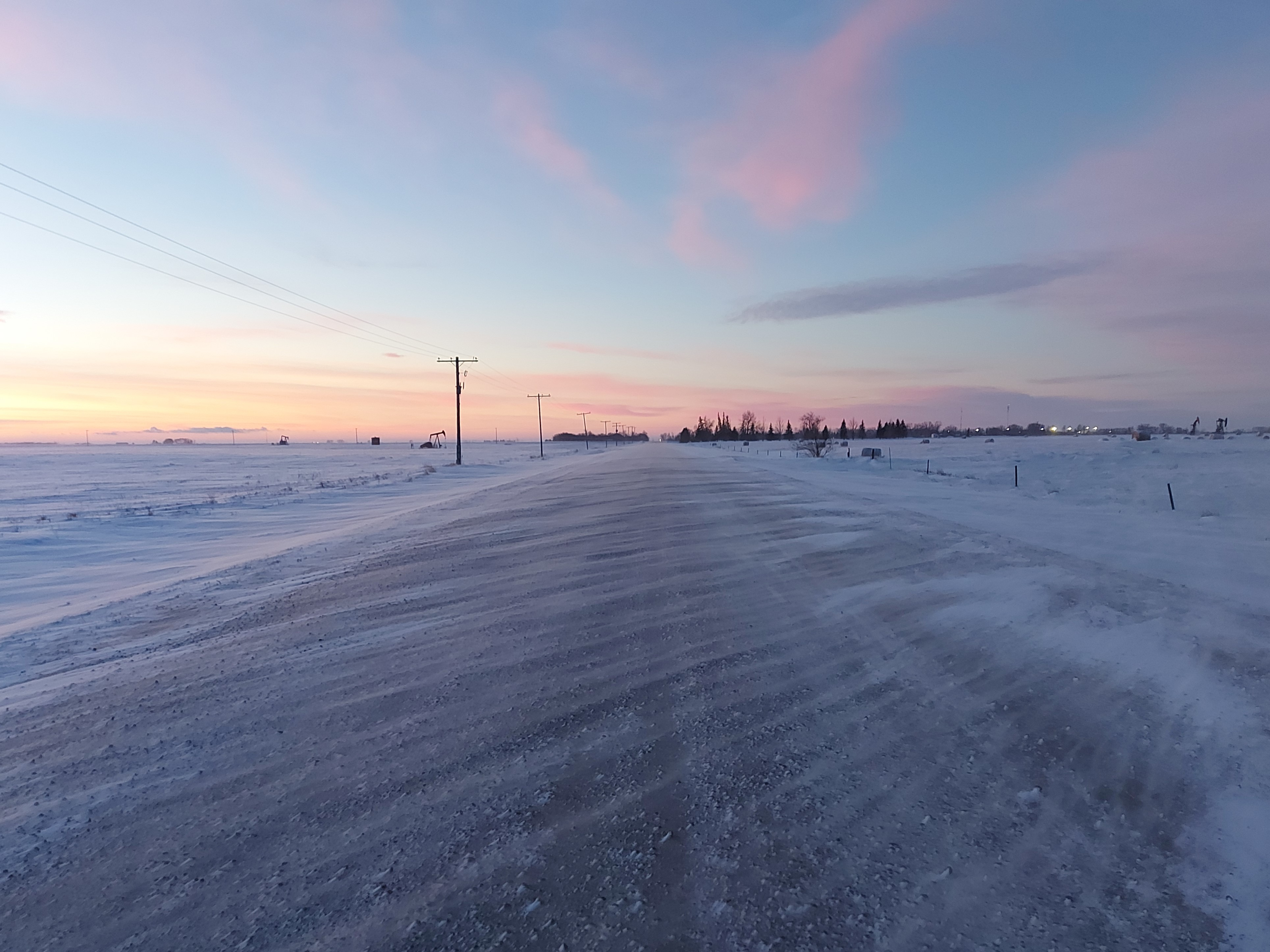
Highway 604 at dawn near North Portal

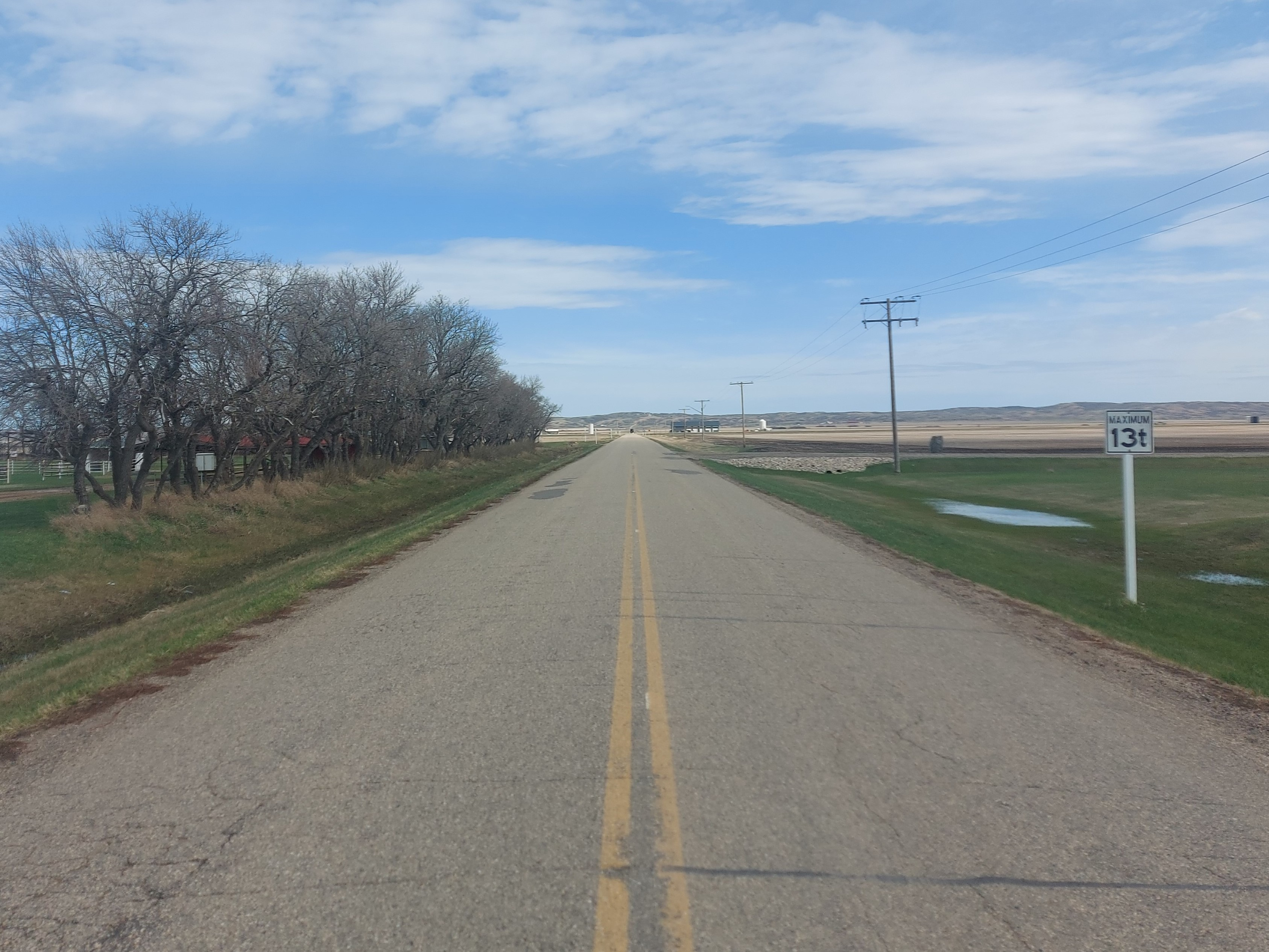
Highway 604 at Arcola

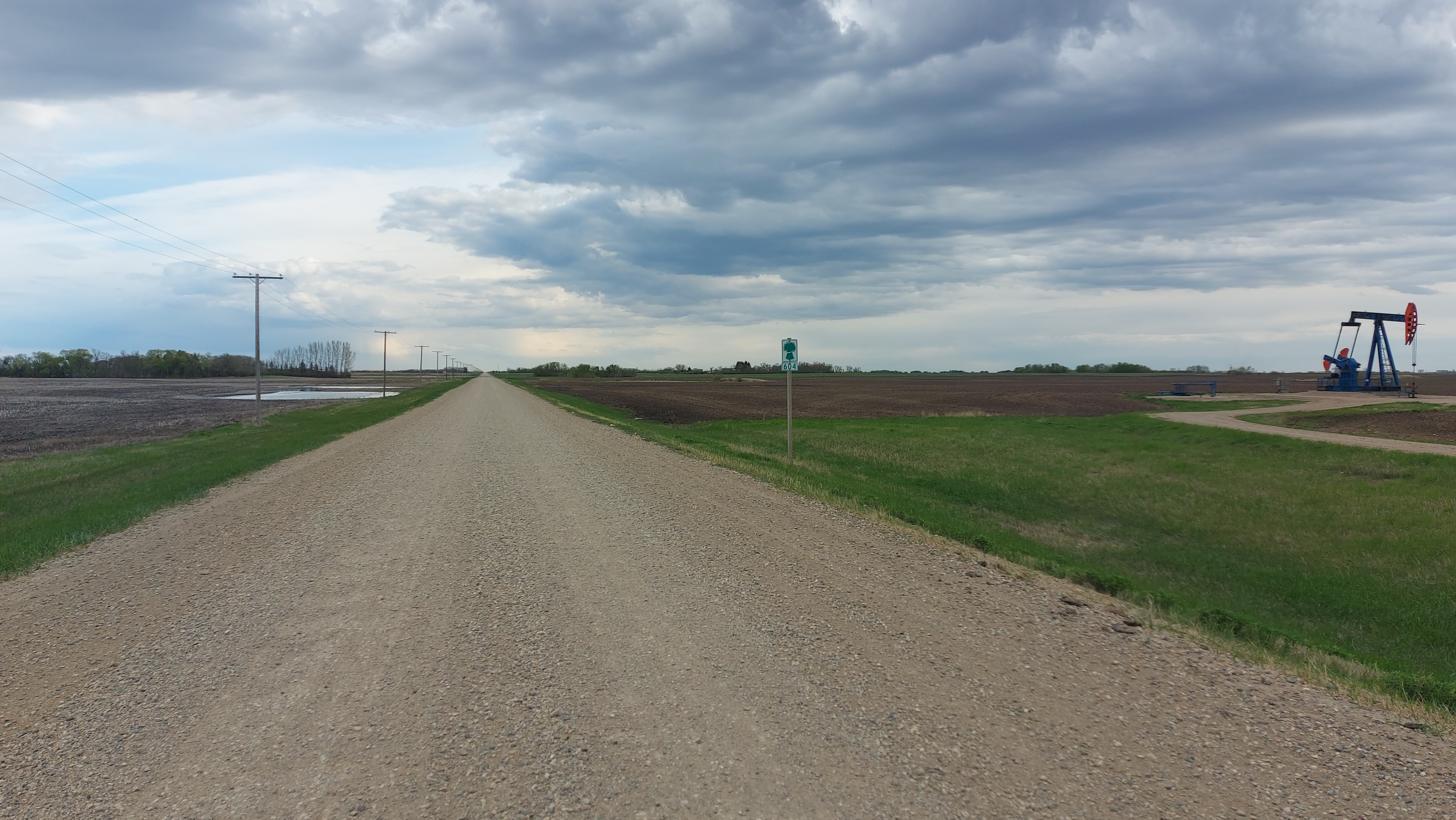
Highway 604

Highway 604 runs from Hwy 39 in the village of North Portal to Hwy 13 (Red Coat Trail / Ghost Town Trail) in the town of Arcola, via Frobisher and Willmar. Portions of the highway are both paved and gravel. It is about 82.7 kilometres (51.4 mi) long.

Hwy 604 begins in the Rural Municipality of Coalfields No. 4 at an intersection with Hwy 39 in the village of North Portal, directly across the street from the Port of North Portal. It meanders through neighbourhoods along First Street, running directly next to the United States border as it crosses over Canadian Pacific Railway's Estevan subdivision and passes through the main part of town, where it turns left away from the border along Portal Grid 604, with the pavement transitioning into gravel as it passes by the Gateway Cities Golf Club. Leaving North Portal, the highway heads due northward through rural farmland for the next several kilometres, having an intersection with Hwy 703 and crossing the Souris River to join Hwy 18 eastbound for a few kilometres (which is paved) before turning off at the village of Frobisher, travelling through the western side of the village along gravel to cross Canadian Pacific Railway's Estevan subdivision before leaving Frobisher along Range Road 2041. After going through a switchback (left onto Township Road 34, right onto Range Road 2042), Hwy 604 enters the Rural Municipality of Browning No. 34 and crosses Hwy 700 east of Steelman before sharing a short concurrency with Hwy 361 westbound, where it officially regains asphalt as it splits off and heads north towards Willmar. After travelling through the west side of the hamlet, where it crosses Canadian National Railway's Lampman subdivision, it enters the Rural Municipality of Brock No. 64, meeting an access road to the hamlet of Wordsworth (Township Road 72) and crossing a bridge over Moose Mountain Creek to enter the town of Arcola, where it passes by the town's airport and travels along the east side of town to come to and end at a junction with Hwy 13 (Red Coat Trail / Ghost Town Trail), with the road continuing north of Range Road 2043. The Moose Mountain Upland, which lies just a few kilometres to the north, is visible from this intersection. The entire length of Hwy 604 is a two-lane highway.

=== Major intersections ===
From south to north:

Rural municipality	Location	km	mi	Destinations	Notes
Coalfields No. 4	North Portal	0.0	0.0	Highway 39 – Port of North Portal, Estevan	Southern terminus; southern end of paved section; across the street from Port of North Portal
Coalfields No. 4	North Portal	1.1	0.68	Border Road / Portal Grid 604	Northern end of paved section; Hwy 604 makes a left onto Grid Road 604
Coalfields No. 4		4.4	2.7	Highway 703 west	Eastern terminus of Hwy 703
Coalfields No. 4		12.9	8.0	Bridge over the Souris River	
Coalfields No. 4		23.5	14.6	Highway 18 west – Hirsch, Estevan	Southern end of both Hwy 18 concurrency and paved section
Coalfields No. 4	Frobisher	30.1	18.7	Highway 18 east – Alameda, Oxbow	Northern end of both Hwy 18 concurrency and paved section
Browning No. 34		41.4	25.7	Highway 700 – Steelman, Alameda	
Browning No. 34		51.1	31.8	Highway 361 east to Highway 9 – Alida	Southern end of both Hwy 361 concurrency and paved section
Browning No. 34		52.8	32.8	Highway 361 west – Lampman	Northern end of Hwy 361 concurrency
Browning No. 34	Willmar	65.7	40.8	Township Road 64 to Main Street – Willmar	
Brock No. 64		72.2	44.9	Township Road 72 – Wordsworth	
Brock No. 64		76.4	47.5	Bridge over Moose Mountain Creek	
Brock No. 64	Arcola	82.7	51.4	Highway 13 (Red Coat Trail / Ghost Town Trail) – Kisbey, Carlyle	Northern terminus; road continues north on gravel as Range Road 2043
1.000 mi = 1.609 km; 1.000 km = 0.621 mi: Concurrency terminus

== SK 605 ==
Highway 605
- Location: Coalfields No. 4, Browning No. 34, Brock No. 64, Hazelwood No. 94, Kingsley No. 124, Elcapo No. 154, Grayson No. 184, Cana No. 214
- Length: 218.1 km (135.5 mi)

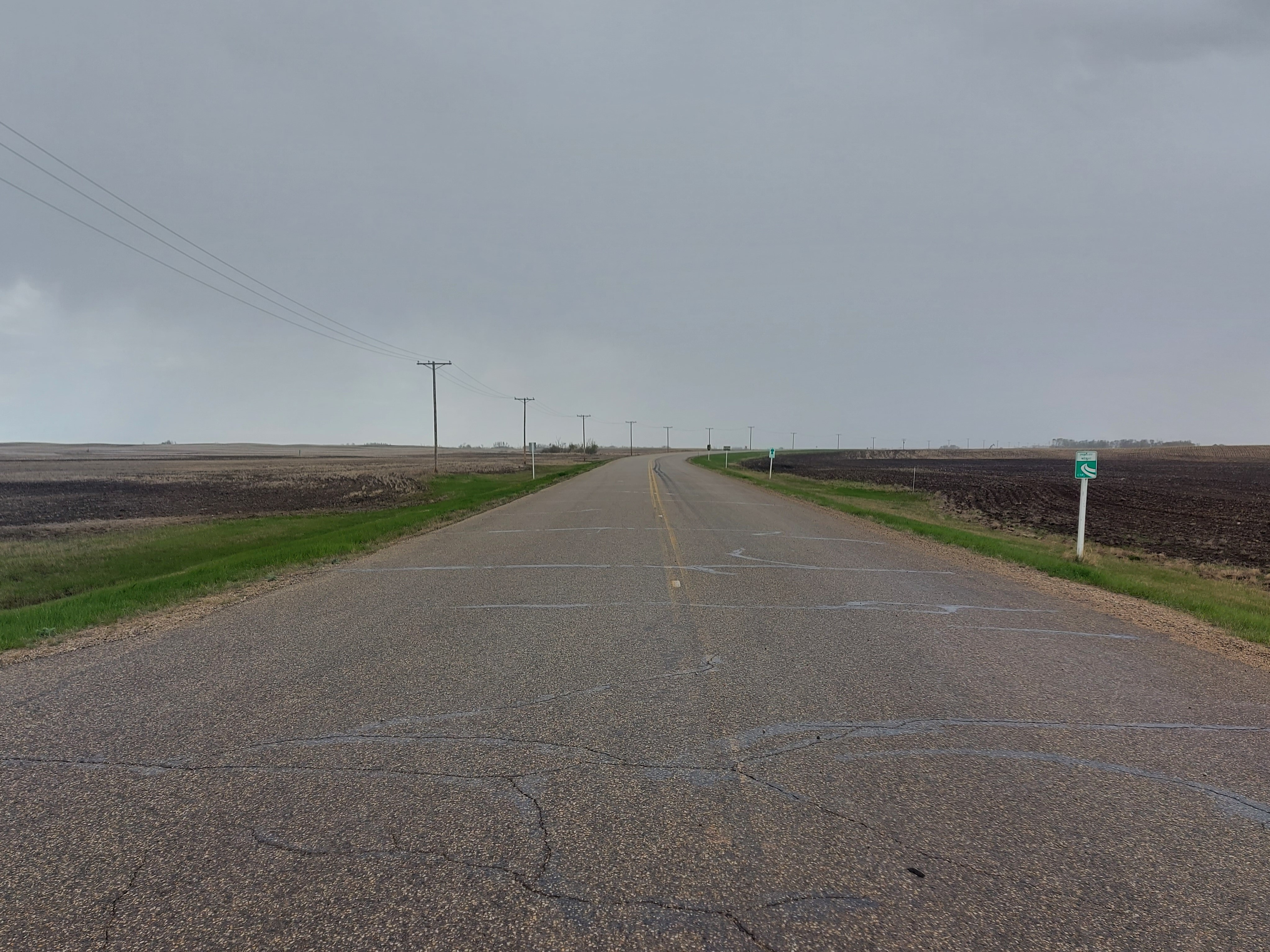
Highway 605, north of Lampman

Highway 605 runs from Highway 15 east of Melville south to Highway 18 east of Bienfait. With portions of it being paved or gravel, it is approximately 218.1 kilometres (135.5 mi) long.

Hwy 605 begins in the Rural Municipality of Coalfields No. 4 at an intersection with Hwy 18 just east of the town of Bienfait, immediately crossing Canadian Pacific Railway's Estevan subdivision as it heads north as a paved two-lane highway across rural farmland to have an intersection with Hwy 704 and enter the Rural Municipality of Browning No. 34, having an intersection with Hwy 700 and entering the town of Lampman. It crosses Canadian National Railway's Lampman subdivision as it travels through an industrial area before making a right at the Lampman Golf Club, joining a concurrency (overlap) with Hwy 361 eastbound as the pair travel along Corrigan Road to cross the same railway line again and traverse neighbourhoods along the south side of downtown. At the eastern end of town, Hwy 605 splits off and heads north, crossing the same railway line for the third and final time as it leaves Lampman and travels to the west of Browning, where it traverses a switchback and enters the Rural Municipality of Brock No. 64. The highway passes through rural areas, where it crosses Moose Mountain Creek to enter the village of Kisbey, travelling along the western side of town along King Street to have a junction with Hwy 13 (Red Coat Trail / Ghost Town Trail). Leaving Kisbey behind, the highway ascends onto the western side of the Moose Mountain Upland, with the asphalt transitioning to gravel at the intersection with Township Road 92. Hwy 605 travels through the Pheasant Rump 68 First Nation Reserve, where it crosses into the Rural Municipality of Hazelwood No. 94 and travels through the community of Warmley, prior to going through a switchback winding its way through mostly wooded terrain, where it crosses Hwy 711 and travels to the west of the hamlets of Hazelwood and Bekevar.

Lowering back down off of the upland, Hwy 605 enters the Kingsley No. 124 and traverses through rural farmland for the next several kilometres to temporarily gain asphalt again as it travels through the eastern side of the town of Kipling, where it crosses Hwy 48, crosses Canadian National Railway's Cromer subdivision, passes by the town's airport, and shares a short concurrency with the western end of Hwy 709, before leaving the town and continuing north along gravel. The highway heads north through rural areas, traversing a switchback (where it has an intersection with Hwy 703) and crossing Pipestone Creek, before entering the Rural Municipality of Elcapo No. 154 and crossing a causeway / bridge over Ekapo Lake. Entering the town of Broadview at the intersection with Rideau Street, it regains asphalt again as travels through neighbourhoods along Sixth Avenue to enter downtown, where it makes a left turn onto Main Street and then a right turn onto Ninth Avenue, where it crosses under the Canadian Pacific Railway's Broadview subdivision and makes a slight right onto Qu'Appelle Road. After crossing Hwy 1 (Trans-Canada Highway), Hwy 605 immediately makes a left turn as it leaves the town behind, running parallel to the Trans-Canada for a couple of kilometres before curving back northward and winding its way through portions of the Kahkewistahaw First Nation reserve and Cowessess 73 as it lowers down into the Qu'Appelle Valley, crossing the Qu'Appelle River into the Rural Municipality of Grayson No. 184.

It immediately crosses Hwy 247 just west of Sunset Beach and climbs its way back out of the valley, heading due northward through rural farmland for the next several kilometres to travel along the eastern side of the village of Grayson via Mission Road (which is paved), where it has an intersection with Hwy 22. Continuing on, the highway enters the Rural Municipality of Cana No. 214 along Cana Road, travelling along the eastern side of the hamlet of Cana (where it crosses Canadian National Railway's Rivers subdivision) before coming to an end at an intersection with Hwy 15 several kilometres to the east of the city of Melville, with the road continuing north as Range Road 2053.

=== Major intersections ===
From south to north:

Rural municipality	Location	km	mi	Destinations	Notes
Coalfields No. 4		0.0	0.0	Highway 18 – Frobisher, Hirsch, Bienfait, Estevan	Southern terminus; southern end of paved section; road continues south as Range Road 2064
Coalfields No. 4		5.2	3.2	Highway 704 west (Township Road 32)	Eastern terminus of Hwy 704
Browning No. 34		14.9	9.3	Highway 700 east (Township Road 42) – Steelman	Western terminus of Hwy 700
Browning No. 34	Lampman	24.6	15.3	Highway 361 west (Corrigan Road) – Midale	Southern end of Hwy 361 concurrency
Browning No. 34	Lampman	26.2	16.3	Highway 361 east (Corrigan Road) – Alida	Northern end of Hwy 361 concurrency
Brock No. 64		58.9	36.6	Bridge over Moose Mountain Creek	
Brock No. 64	Kisbey	62.2	38.6	Highway 13 (Red Coat Trail / Ghost Town Trail) – Forget, Arcola	
Brock No. 64		70.0	43.5	Northern end of paved section at Township Road 92	
Hazelwood No. 94	Moose Valley	97.0	60.3	Highway 711 – Corning, Hazelwood	
Hazelwood No. 94		106.7	66.3	Bekevar Road (Township Road 124) – Bekevar, Kennedy	
Kingsley No. 124	Kipling	115.0	71.5	Southern end of paved section at Kipling Town Cemetery	
Kingsley No. 124	Kipling	115.9	72.0	Highway 48 – Windthorst, Kennedy Highway 709 begins	Northern end of paved section; western terminus of Hwy 709; southern end of Hwy 709 concurrency
Kingsley No. 124	Kipling	116.0	72.1	Kipling Airport	Access road
Kingsley No. 124		119.5	74.3	Highway 709 east – Moosomin	Northern end of Hwy 709 concurrency
Kingsley No. 124		132.5	82.3	Highway 703 east – St. Hubert Mission, Wapella	Western terminus of Hwy 703
Kingsley No. 124		135.7	84.3	Bridge over Pipestone Creek	
Elcapo No. 154		144.7– 145.0	89.9– 90.1	Causeway / bridge across Ekapo Lake	
Elcapo No. 154	Broadview	149.6	93.0	Rideau Street	Southern end of paved section
Elcapo No. 154	Broadview	151.7	94.3	Highway 1 (TCH) – Grenfell, Whitewood	Northern end of paved section
Elcapo No. 154 / Grayson No. 184	Cowessess 73	180.8	112.3	Bridge over the Qu'Appelle River	
Grayson No. 184		181.1	112.5	Highway 247 – Crooked Lake Provincial Park, Sunset Beach, West End	
Grayson No. 184	Grayson	196.0	121.8	Southern end of paved section	
Grayson No. 184	Grayson	196.1	121.9	Railway Avenue – Grayson	
Grayson No. 184	Grayson	196.8	122.3	Highway 22 – Killaly, Dubuc	Northern end of paved section
Grayson No. 184		209.9	130.4	Township Road 215 – Waldron	
Cana No. 214	Cana	214.1	133.0	Cana access road	
Cana No. 214	Cana	214.8	133.5	Cana access road	
Cana No. 214		218.1	135.5	Highway 15 – Melville, Churchbridge	Northern terminus; road continues north as Range Road 2053
1.000 mi = 1.609 km; 1.000 km = 0.621 mi: Concurrency terminus

== SK 606 ==
Highway 606
- Location: Cambria No. 6, Cymri No. 36, Griffin No. 66, Fillmore No. 96, Montmartre No. 126, Indian Head No. 156, Abernethy No. 186
- Length: 185.9 km (115.5 mi)

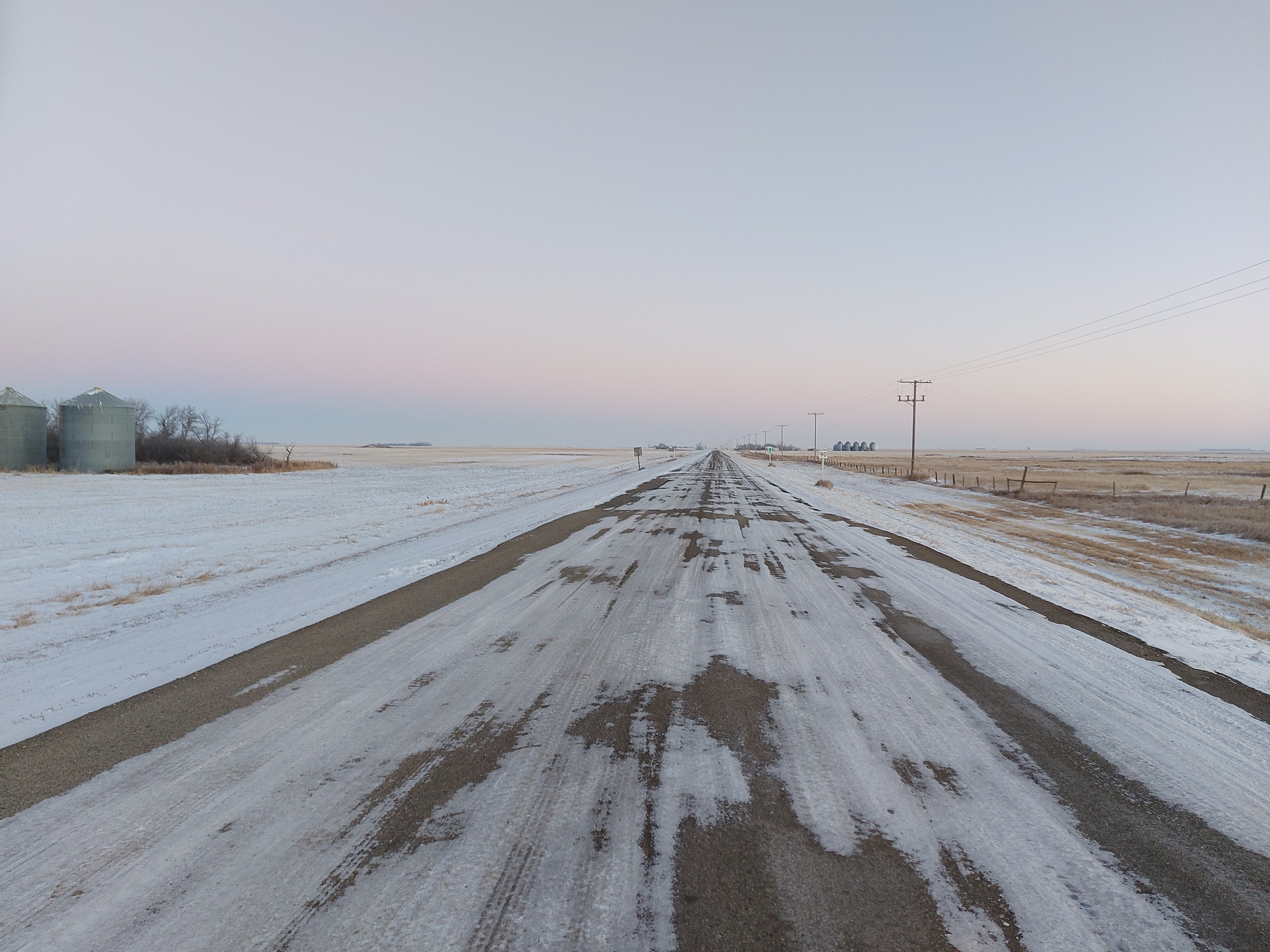
Highway 606 at its southern terminus

Highway 606 runs from Highway 22 near Abernethy south to Highways 18 and 350 at Torquay. The highway is about 185.9 kilometres (115.5 mi) long.

Highway 606 passes near the towns of Sintaluta, Montmartre, Fillmore, Griffin, Midale, and Torquay. Access to Mainprize Regional Park on McDonald Lake is also from Highway 606, as well as Kemoca Regional Park.

The section of the highway between the Trans-Canada at Sintaluta and Hwy 22 near Abernethy is unsigned, with portion within Sintaluta signed solely as Main Street, the portion within the RM of Indian Head No. 156 signed solely as Range Road 2113, Township Road 182, and Range Road 2112, as well as the portion within the RM of Abernethy No. 186 being signed as Pheasant Creek Road.

Hwy 606 begins in the Rural Municipality of Cambria No. 6 on the north side of the village of Torquay at the intersection between Hwy 350 and Hwy 18, heading north as a paved two-lane highway through rural farmland, traversing a switchback and crossing a causeway / bridge over McDonald Lake (Souris River). Entering the Rural Municipality of Cymri No. 36, it meets the access road to Mainprize Regional Park (Township Road 52) and makes a sudden sharp right turn, heading east to enter the town of Midale and make a sharp left turn and cross Hwy 39 via a switchback. After crossing the Canadian Pacific Railway's Weyburn subdivision, the highway leaves the town and heads north through rural farmland to cross Hwy 705 and enter the Rural Municipality of Griffin No. 66 via a switchback, where the pavement transitions to gravel.

Hwy 606 travels through the eastern side of the hamlet of Griffin, where it crosses both a former railway line and Hwy 13 (Red Coat Trail / Ghost Town Trail), before travelling through rural areas to enter both the Rural Municipality of Fillmore No. 96 and the village of Fillmore, where it has an intersection with Hwy 742 and shares a short concurrency (overlap) with westbound Hwy 33 (which is paved). It crosses the Stewart Southern Railway to leave Fillmore and head north along gravel through farmland once again for several kilometres, where it crosses Hwy 711, to enter the Rural Municipality of Montmartre No. 126, crossing Moose Mountain Creek and entering the village of Montmartre as it passes by Kemoca Regional Park (accessed via 5th Street). The highway travels along the eastern side of town, where it crosses Canadian National Railway's Glenavon subdivision, before travelling through neighbourhoods along the northern side of town, where it shares a short concurrency with westbound Hwy 48 (which is paved). Leaving Montmartre behind, Hwy 606 heads north along gravel to cross the Assiniboine 76 First Nation Reserve, where it enters the Rural Municipality of Indian Head No. 156.

Hwy 606 enters the town of Sintaluta at its intersection with the Trans-Canada Highway (Hwy 1), where Hwy 606 signage ends as the highway continues along Main Street to cross Canadian Pacific Railway's Indian Head subdivision and travel through the centre of downtown. This section through Sintaluta is paved, returning to gravel at the northern town limits. The highway winds its way northeast, leaving Sintaluta behind to cross the Qu'Appelle River Valley, and the river itself, into the Rural Municipality of Abernethy No. 186. It meanders northward through farmland for several kilometres, crossing Pheasant Creek just east of the Motherwell Homestead National Historic Site shortly before coming to an end at an intersection with Hwy 22 just east of the village of Abernethy. The road continues north as a Range Road.

=== Major intersections ===
From south to north:

Rural municipality	Location	km	mi	Destinations	Notes
Cambria No. 6	Torquay	0.0	0.0	Highway 18 – Estevan, Oungre Highway 350 south – Torquay, Port of Torquay	Southern terminus; northern terminus of Hwy 350; southern end of paved section; road continues as Hwy 350 southbound
Cambria No. 6		23.9– 24.6	14.9– 15.3	Causeway / bridge across McDonald Lake (Souris River)	
Cymri No. 36		29.1	18.1	Township Road 52 – Mainprize Regional Park	
Cymri No. 36		30.8	19.1	Range Road 2122 to Highway 705 – Halbrite	Hwy 606 makes a right onto Township Road 53
Cymri No. 36	Midale	38.9	24.2	Main Street – Midale	Hwy 606 makes a right onto Range Road 2113
Cymri No. 36	Midale	39.3	24.4	Highway 39 – Halbrite, Midale	
Cymri No. 36	Midale	39.4	24.5	Macoun Road to Highway 702 – Midale	Hwy 606 makes a left
Cymri No. 36	Midale	39.9	24.8	Railway Avenue – Midale	
Cymri No. 36	Midale	40.0	24.9	Railway Avenue N – Midale	
Cymri No. 36		50.3	31.3	Highway 705 – Halbrite, Benson	
Cymri No. 36 – Griffin No. 66 boundary		53.6	33.3	Northern end of paved section at switchback	
Griffin No. 66	Griffin	70.2	43.6	Highway 13 (Red Coat Trail / Ghost Town Trail) – Weyburn, Froude, Stoughton	
Fillmore No. 96	Fillmore	92.8	57.7	Highway 742 west – Cedoux	Eastern terminus of Hwy 742
Fillmore No. 96	Fillmore	93.8	58.3	Highway 33 east – Creelman	Southern end of both Hwy 33 concurrency and paved section
Fillmore No. 96	Fillmore	94.1	58.5	Main Street – Fillmore	
Fillmore No. 96	Fillmore	94.8	58.9	Highway 33 west – Osage	Northern end of both Hwy 33 concurrency and paved section
Fillmore No. 96		103.0	64.0	Highway 711 – Osage, Corning	
Montmartre No. 126		129.7	80.6	Bridge over Moose Mountain Creek	
Montmartre No. 126	Montmartre	131.4	81.6	5th Street – Kemoca Regional Park	
Montmartre No. 126	Montmartre	132.2	82.1	Highway 48 east – Candiac	Southern end of both Hwy 48 concurrency and paved section
Montmartre No. 126	Montmartre	132.9	82.6	Highway 48 west – Kendal 1st Avenue W – Downtown, Kemoca Regional Park	Northern end of both Hwy 48 concurrency and paved section
Indian Head No. 156	Sintaluta	161.9	100.6	Highway 1 (TCH) – Indian Head, Wolseley	Southern end of both unsigned segment and paved section
Indian Head No. 156	Sintaluta	162.7	101.1	Northern end of paved section at Waverly Street	
Indian Head No. 156 – Abernethy No. 186 boundary		174.5	108.4	Bridge over the Qu'Appelle River	
Abernethy No. 186		183.3	113.9	Bridge over Pheasant Creek	
Abernethy No. 186		185.9	115.5	Highway 22 – Abernethy, Lemberg	Northern terminus; northern end of unsigned section; road continues north as a range road
1.000 mi = 1.609 km; 1.000 km = 0.621 mi: Concurrency terminus

== SK 607 ==
Highway 607
- Rosefield Grid Road
- Location: Val Marie No. 17
- Length: 36.0 km (22.4 mi)

Highway 607, also known as Rosefield Grid Road, runs from a dead end at the United States border south of Rosefield to a junction with Highway 4 / Highway 18 south of Val Marie, providing access to the southern section of the West Block of Grasslands National Park. It is entirely a two-lane gravel road, providing the only road access (without going through the national park) to Rosefield, and is entirely within the Rural Municipality of Val Marie No. 17. It is approximately 36.0-kilometre-long (22.4 mi).

Highway 607 begins at a dead end directly on the United States border, heading north through farmland along Range Road 3122 for a couple kilometres before making a right to travel along the south side of Rosefield, with access via Range Road 3123. It curves back northward along Range Road 3124, entering prairie lands as it meets Township Road 21, which provides access to the National Park's Ecotour Scenic Drive and the North Gillespie area. The highway winds its way northeast through a series of switchbacks along the park boundary for the next several kilometres, where it passes by the Three Sisters Trailhead and the access road to the Two Trees Day Use Area, before coming to an end at a junction with Highway 4 / Highway 18 just south of the village of Val Marie.

=== Major intersections ===
From south to north:

Rural municipality	Location	km	mi	Destinations	Notes
Val Marie No. 17		0.0	0.0	Dead end at United States border	Southern terminus
Val Marie No. 17	Rosefield	8.1	5.0	Range Road 3123 – Rosefield	
Val Marie No. 17		16.1	10.0	Township Road 21 – Grasslands National Park – Ecotour Scenic Drive, North Gillespie	
Val Marie No. 17	Grasslands National Park	18.6	11.6	Three Sisters Trailhead	
Val Marie No. 17		34.4	21.4	Grasslands National Park – Two Trees access road	
Val Marie No. 17		36.0	22.4	Highway 4 / Highway 18 – Val Marie, Port of Monchy, Orkney	Northern terminus; access to Grasslands National Park Visitor Centre and 70 Mille Butte is via Hwy 4 north / Hwy 18 east
1.000 mi = 1.609 km; 1.000 km = 0.621 mi

== SK 608 ==
Highway 608
- Location: Stonehenge No. 73, Sutton No. 103
- Length: 38.1 km (23.7 mi)

Highway 608 runs from Hwy 13 (Red Coat Trail) just east of Limerick northward to Hwy 718 west of Mossbank via Mazenod, where it crosses Hwy 43. It is about 38 kilometres (24 mi) long and is a gravel, two-lane road for its entire length.

=== Major intersections ===
From south to north:

Rural municipality	Location	km	mi	Destinations	Notes
Stonehenge No. 73		0.0	0.0	Highway 13 (Red Coat Trail) – Limerick, Assiniboia	Southern terminus
Sutton No. 103	Mazenod	24.9	15.5	Railway Avenue – Mazenod	
Sutton No. 103	Mazenod	25.6	15.9	Highway 43 – Gravelbourg, Mossbank	
Sutton No. 103		38.1	23.7	Highway 718 – Mossbank, Courval, Coderre	Northern terminus
1.000 mi = 1.609 km; 1.000 km = 0.621 mi

== SK 609 ==
Highway 609
- Location: Auvergne No. 76, Whiska Creek No. 106, Coulee No. 136
- Length: 47.7 km (29.6 mi)

Highway 609 runs from the junction of Highways 363 and 721, just south of Hallonquist, south to the intersection with Highway 13 (Red Coat Trail / Ghost Town Trail), just west of Aneroid. Hwy 609 also passes through the village of Vanguard, where it crosses both Hwy 43 and Notukeu Creek. It is approximately 47.7 kilometres (29.6 mi) long.

Hwy 609 begins in the Rural Municipality of Auvergne No. 76 at an intersection with Hwy 13 (Red Coat Trail / Ghost Town Trail) just west of Aneroid, with the road continuing south towards Hwy 18 and the Rural Municipality of Glen McPherson No. 46 as Range Road 3104. It heads north across the Shaunavon subdivision of the Great Western Railway to have an intersection with an access road to Aneroid (Railway Avenue) before heading north through rural farmland for several kilometres to enter the Rural Municipality of Whiska Creek No. 106, going through a switchback and crossing a bridge over Notukeu Creek to enter the village of Vanguard. Travelling along the western side of downtown through neighbourhoods along Division Street, it passes by the village's Health Centre and crosses both Great Western Railway's Vanguard subdivision and Hwy 43. Leaving Vanguard and winding its way northeastward (via a switchback), the highway climbs over some hilly terrain as it enters the Rural Municipality of Coulee No. 136, coming to an end shortly thereafter at an intersection between Hwy 363 and the eastern end of Hwy 721, just across Wiwa Creek from Hallonquist. With the exclusion of the section within Vanguard, which is paved, the entire length of Hwy 609 is a gravel, two-lane road.

=== Major intersections ===
From south to north:

Rural municipality	Location	km	mi	Destinations	Notes
Auvergne No. 76	Aneroid	0.0	0.0	Highway 13 (Red Coat Trail / Ghost Town Trail) – Hazenmore, Ponteix	Southern terminus; road continues south as Range Road 3104
Auvergne No. 76	Aneroid	0.6	0.37	Railway Avenue – Aneroid	
Whiska Creek No. 106		21.0	13.0	Bridge over Notukeu Creek	
Whiska Creek No. 106	Vanguard	21.9	13.6	Southern end of paved section beside of Vanguard Health Centre	
Whiska Creek No. 106	Vanguard	22.6	14.0	Highway 43 – Pambrun, Gravelbourg	Northern end of paved section
Coulee No. 136		47.7	29.6	Highway 363 – Neidpath, Hallonquist, Hodgeville Highway 721 west – McMahon, Wymark	Northern terminus; eastern terminus of Hwy 721
1.000 mi = 1.609 km; 1.000 km = 0.621 mi

== SK 610 ==
Highway 610
- Location: Waverley No. 44, Wood River No. 74, Gravelbourg No. 104
- Length: 67 km (42 mi)

Highway 610 runs from Highway 18 to Highway 718 near Bateman. Highway 610 also passes near the community of Woodrow. It intersects Highways 13 and 43. It is about 67 kilometres (42 mi) long.

Hwy 610 begins in the Rural Municipality of Waverley No. 44 at an intersection with Hwy 18 halfway between McCord and Glentworth, heading north through rural farmland for several kilometres to cross both a former railway line and Six Mile Creek before entering the Rural Municipality of Wood River No. 74, crossing both the Wood River and Pinto Creek as it traverses a switchback and enters Woodrow via crossing the Great Western Railway. After travelling along the western side of town and intersecting Hwy 13 (Red Coat Trail / Ghost Town Trail), it leaves Woodrow behind and heads north through rural areas into the Rural Municipality of Gravelbourg No. 104, sharing a short concurrency (overlap) with westbound Hwy 43 just west of the town of Gravelbourg before crossing Notukeu Creek and entering the hamlet of Bateman, where the highway comes to an end at an intersection with Hwy 720 (Railway Avenue). With the exclusion of the concurrency with Hwy 43, which is paved, the entire length of Hwy 610 is a gravel, two-lane road.

=== Major intersections ===
From south to north:

Rural municipality	Location	km	mi	Destinations	Notes
Waverley No. 44		0.0	0.0	Highway 18 – Glentworth, McCord	Southern terminus; road continues south as Range Road 3063
Waverley No. 44		3.7	2.3	Bridge over Six Mile Creek	
Wood River No. 74		12.1	7.5	Bridge over the Wood River	
Wood River No. 74		26.9	16.7	Bridge over Pinto Creek	
Wood River No. 74	Woodrow	30.5	19.0	Highway 13 (Red Coat Trail / Ghost Town Trail) – Meyronne, Lafleche	
Gravelbourg No. 104		49.9	31.0	Highway 43 east – Gravelbourg	Southern end of both Hwy 43 concurrency and paved section
Gravelbourg No. 104		52.0	32.3	Highway 43 west – Glenbain, Vanguard	Northern end of both Hwy 43 concurrency and paved section
Gravelbourg No. 104		64.9	40.3	Bridge over Notukeu Creek	
Gravelbourg No. 104	Bateman	67.5	41.9	Highway 718 east (Railway Avenue) / Railway Avenue to Highway 19 / Highway 58 – Hodgeville, Mossbank	Northern terminus; western terminus of Hwy 718
1.000 mi = 1.609 km; 1.000 km = 0.621 mi: Concurrency terminus

== SK 611 ==
Highway 611
- Location: Mankota No. 45, Pinto Creek No. 75
- Length: 27.5 km (17.1 mi)

Highway 611 runs from Highway 18 near McCord north to Highway 13 near Meyronne. Highway 611 is about 27.5 kilometres (17.1 mi) long.

Hwy 611 begins in the Rural Municipality of Mankota No. 45 at an intersection with Hwy 18 on the northern side of McCord, with the road continuing south into town as Range Road 3071. It heads north along gravel to cross a bridge over McDonald Creek and heads north through a mix of farmland and prairie lands for several kilometres to enter the Rural Municipality of Pinto Creek No. 75. The highway crosses both a bridge over Pinto Creek and the Great Western Railway to enter Meyronne, gaining asphalt as it passes through the centre of town before coming to an end at an intersection with Hwy 13 (Red Coat Trail / Ghost Town Trail), with the road continuing north along Range Road 3071.

=== Major intersections ===
From south to north:

Rural municipality	Location	km	mi	Destinations	Notes
Mankota No. 45	McCord	0.0	0.0	Highway 18 – Glentworth, Ferland Range Road 3071 – McCord	Southern terminus; road continues south as Range Road 3071
Mankota No. 45	McCord	0.1	0.062	Bridge over McDonald Creek	
Pinto Creek No. 75	Meyronne	25.6	15.9	Bridge over Pinto Creek; southern end of paved section	
Pinto Creek No. 75		27.5	17.1	Highway 13 (Red Coat Trail / Ghost Town Trail) – Kincaid, Woodrow	Northern terminus; road continues north as Range Road 3071
1.000 mi = 1.609 km; 1.000 km = 0.621 mi

== SK 612 ==
Highway 612
- Location: Morse No. 165
- Length: 20.3 km (12.6 mi)

Highway 612 runs from Highway 1 (Trans-Canada Highway) in Herbert to Highway 738 near Gouldtown. Highway 612 is about 20 kilometres (12 mi) long.

Highway 612 begins at Highway 1 (Trans-Canada Highway) in the town of Herbert, where it heads north through downtown along Shaw Street (which is paved), crossing Canadian Pacific Railway's Swift Current subdivision and having an intersection with Highway 645 (Herbert Avenue). It enters the Rural Municipality of Morse No. 165 and crosses a short causeway over a small lake, Highway 612's asphalt reverts to gravel as it heads due north through rural farmland for several kilometres to come to an end just immediately south of Gouldtown at an intersection with Highway 738, with the road continuing north into Gouldtown as Range Road 3095.

=== Major intersections ===
From south to north:

Rural municipality	Location	km	mi	Destinations	Notes
Morse No. 165	Herbert	0.0	0.0	Highway 1 (TCH) west – Moose Jaw, Swift Current	Highway 612 southern terminus
Morse No. 165	Herbert	0.6	0.37	Highway 645 north (Herbert Avenue) – Main Centre, Herbert Ferry Regional Park	
Morse No. 165		1.5	0.93	Northern end of paved section at causeway over small lake	
Morse No. 165		20.3	12.6	Highway 738 (Township Road 192) – Main Centre, Glen Kerr, Riverhurst Ferry Range Road 3095 – Gouldtown	Highway 612 northern terminus; road continues north as Range Road 3095
1.000 mi = 1.609 km; 1.000 km = 0.621 mi

== SK 613 ==
Highway 613
- Location: Frontier No. 19, White Valley No. 49, Arlington No. 79
- Length: 63.9 km (39.7 mi)

Highway 613 runs from Highway 724 south to Highway 18 at Frontier. It is about 63.9 kilometres (39.7 mi) long.

Hwy 613 begins in the Rural Municipality of Frontier No. 19 at an intersection with Hwy 18 in the village of Frontier, with the road continuing south towards the village's airport as Friggstad Road (Range Road 3200). It heads north along 2nd Street E through neighbourhoods along the eastern side of downtown before crossing Great Western Railway's Notukeu subdivision and leaving town, winding its way northward via several switchbacks into the Rural Municipality of White Valley No. 49, crossing a bridge over the Frenchman River before entering the Rural Municipality of Arlington No. 79. The highway shares a short concurrency (overlap) with Hwy 13 (Red Coat Trail / Ghost Town Trail) eastbound before travelling through Dollard, where it crosses Great Western Railway's Altawan subdivision. Leaving Dollard, Hwy 613 heads due north through rural farmland for several kilometres to come to an end at an intersection with Hwy 724, with the road continuing north as Range Road 3200. The entire length of Hwy 613, with the exclusion of the section within the village of Frontier and the concurrency with Hwy 13, both of which are paved, is a gravel two-lane road.

=== Major intersections ===
From south to north:

Rural municipality	Location	km	mi	Destinations	Notes
Frontier No. 19	Frontier	0.0	0.0	Highway 18 – Climax, Loomis, Claydon Friggstad Road (Range Road 3200) – Frontier Airport, Honey Bee Manufacturing Plant	Southern terminus; road continues south as Friggstad Road
White Valley No. 49		25.0	15.5	Bridge over the Frenchman River	
Arlington No. 79		49.0	30.4	Highway 13 west (Red Coat Trail / Ghost Town Trail) – South Fork, Eastend	Southern end of Hwy 13 concurrency
Arlington No. 79	Dollard	50.7	31.5	Highway 13 east (Red Coat Trail / Ghost Town Trail) – Shaunavon	Northern end of Hwy 13 concurrency
Arlington No. 79		63.9	39.7	Highway 724 – Piapot, Instow	Northern terminus; road continues north as Range Road 3200
1.000 mi = 1.609 km; 1.000 km = 0.621 mi: Concurrency terminus

== SK 614 ==
Highway 614
- Location: Frontier No. 19, White Valley No. 49, Piapot No. 110
- Length: 105.0 km (65.2 mi)

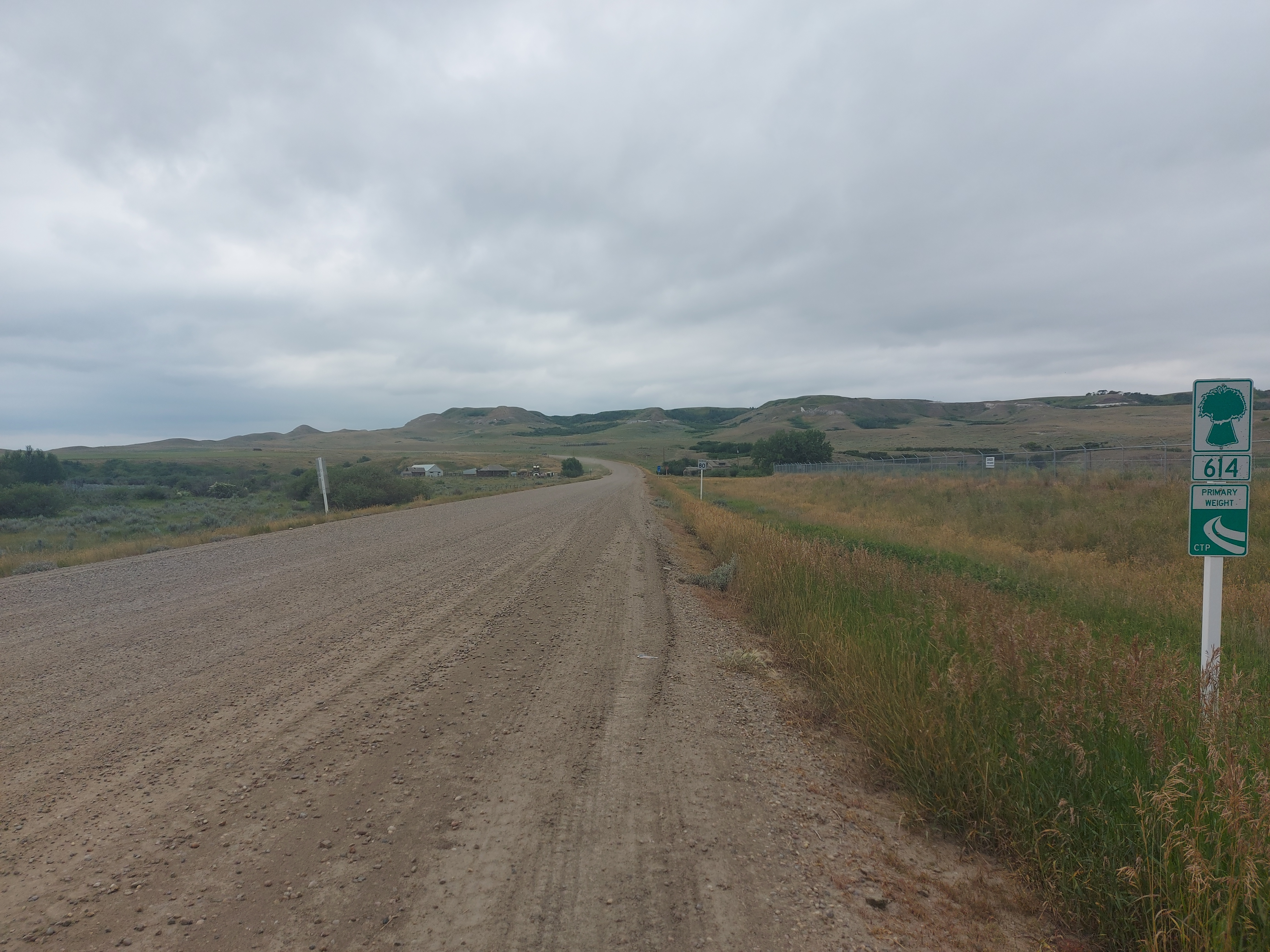
Highway 614

Highway 614 runs from Highway 18 near Loomis north to Highway 1 near Piapot through the Cypress Hills. It passes near the communities of Eastend, Klintonel, Carnagh, and Skull Creek, as well as providing access to the T.rex Discovery Centre. The section north out of Eastend is known as Brady Coulee Road. Highway 614 connects with Highways 13, 706, and 724. It is about 105 kilometres (65 mi) long.

Hwy 614 begins in the Rural Municipality of Frontier No. 19 at an intersection with Hwy 18 in the hamlet of Loomis, heading north along gravel across the Notukeu subdivision of the Great Western Railway to leave Loomis and travel through rural farmland for several kilometres into the Rural Municipality of White Valley No. 49, traversing a couple of switchbacks before lowering itself down into the Frenchman River and entering the town of Eastend. Entering town along Maple Avenue, it crosses Great Western Railway's Altawan subdivision before making a left onto Railway Street at the southern end of downtown, travelling through neighbourhoods along asphalt for several blocks to cross Hwy 13 (Red Coat Trail / Ghost Town Trail) via a zig-zag. After crossing a bridge over the Frenchman River and having an intersection with Hwy 706, Hwy 614 meets an access road to the T.rex Discovery Centre and leaves Eastend along gravel and winds its way northwest through the Cypress for several kilometres to pass through Klintonel before reaching the Rural Municipality of Piapot No. 110. It joins a concurrency (overlap) with westbound Hwy 724 as the pair goes through a switchback and pass through Carnagh, with Hwy 614 splitting off and continuing north shortly thereafter. After travelling through Skull Creek, the highway passes through rural prairie land for several kilometres to arrive at the locality of Sidewood, where it crosses Canadian Pacific Railway's Maple Creek subdivision before coming to an end at an intersection with the Trans-Canada Highway (Hwy 1). The road continues north as Range Road 3223.

=== Major intersections ===
From south to north:

Rural municipality	Location	km	mi	Destinations	Notes
Frontier No. 19	Loomis	0.0	0.0	Highway 18 – Frontier, Claydon	Southern terminus; road continues south as Range Road 3212
White Valley No. 49	Eastend	37.7	23.4	Maple Avenue / Railway Street	Southern end of paved section; Hwy 614 makes a left onto Railway Street
White Valley No. 49	Eastend	38.4– 38.5	23.9– 23.9	Highway 13 (Red Coat Trail / Ghost Town Trail) – Dollard, South Fork, Robsart	Northern end of paved section; crosses Hwy 13 via a zig-zag
White Valley No. 49	Eastend	38.6	24.0	Bridge over the Frenchman River	
White Valley No. 49	Eastend	38.8	24.1	Riverside Boulevard – T.rex Discovery Centre	
White Valley No. 49		40.4	25.1	Highway 706 west (Ravenscrag Road) – Ravenscrag	Eastern terminus of eastern section of Hwy 706
Piapot No. 110		67.9	42.2	Highway 724 east to Highway 37 – Instow	Southern end of Hwy 742 concurrency
Piapot No. 110		82.1	51.0	Highway 724 east – Piapot, Maple Creek	Northern end of Hwy 724 concurrency
Piapot No. 110	Sidewood	105.0	65.2	Highway 1 (TCH) – Piapot, Tompkins	Northern terminus; road continues north as Range Road 3223
1.000 mi = 1.609 km; 1.000 km = 0.621 mi: Concurrency terminus

== SK 615 ==
Highway 615
- Location: Reno No. 51, Maple Creek No. 111
- Length: 48 km (30 mi)

Highway 615 runs from Highway 13 / Highway 21 near Senate to Highway 271 just outside of both the West Block of Cypress Hills Interprovincial Park and the Fort Walsh National Historic Site. Highway 615 passes near the communities of West Plains, Battle Creek, and Merryflat. It is about 48 kilometres (30 mi) long.

Hwy 615 begins in the Rural Municipality of Reno No. 51 at an intersection with Hwy 13 / Hwy 21 (Red Coat Trail / Ghost Town Trail) just immediately north of Senate, heading due northward through rural farmland for several kilometres before winding it way northwest through prairie lands, where it crosses Battle Creek and passes by the localities of West Plains, Battle Creek, and Merryflat. The highway now enters both the Cypress Hills and the Rural Municipality of Maple Creek No. 111, winding its way north across hilly terrain for several kilometres before coming to an end at an intersection with Hwy 271 just outside of the West Block of Cypress Hills Interprovincial Park, with the road continuing north as eastbound Hwy 271 towards the town of Maple Creek. Hwy 615 is a gravel, two-lane road for its entire length.

=== Major intersections ===
From south to north:

Rural municipality	Location	km	mi	Destinations	Notes
Reno No. 51		0.0	0.0	Highway 13 / Highway 21 (Red Coat Trail / Ghost Town Trail) – Consul, Senate	Southern terminus
Reno No. 51		15.4	9.6	Bridge over Battle Creek	
Maple Creek No. 111		48.0	29.8	Highway 271 – Cypress Hills Interprovincial Park West Block, Fort Walsh National Historic Site, Maple Creek	Northern terminus; road continues north as eastbound Hwy 271
1.000 mi = 1.609 km; 1.000 km = 0.621 mi

== SK 616 ==
Highway 616
- Location: Tecumseh No. 65, Golden West No. 95, Chester No. 125, Elcapo No. 154
- Length: 84.3 km (52.4 mi)

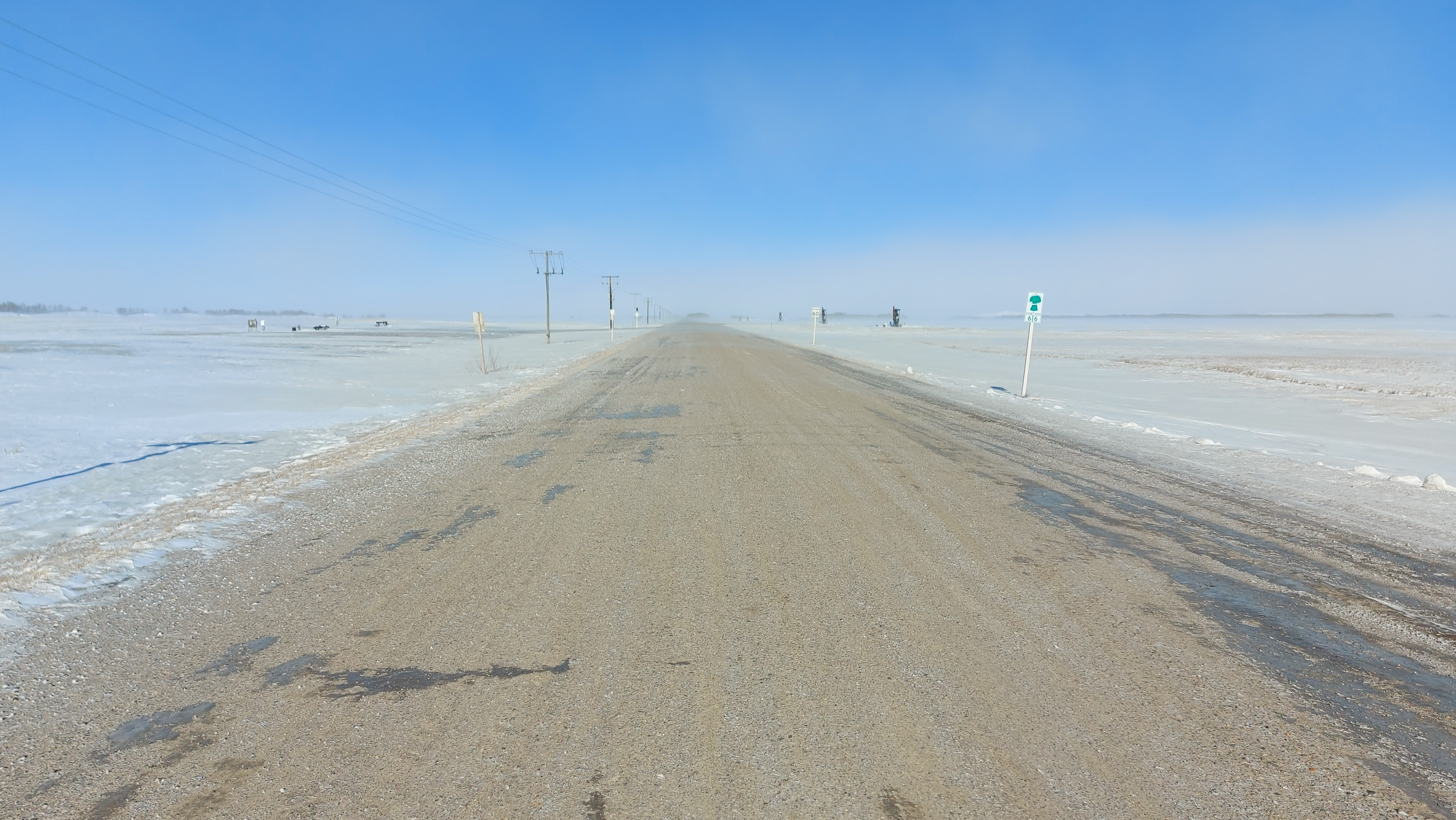
Highway 616 at its southern terminus, near Forget

Highway 616 runs from Highway 13 near Forget to Highway 1 near Grenfell. It has a 5.6-kilometre (3.5 mi) long concurrency with Highway 48 near Peebles. The highway is about 84 kilometres (52 mi) long.

Hwy 616 begins in the Rural Municipality of Tecumseh No. 65 just north of the village of Forget at an intersection with Hwy 13 (Red Coat Trail / Ghost Town Trail), heading north through rural farmland for several kilometres to cross a bridge over Moose Mountain Creek into the Rural Municipality of Golden West No. 95, travelling through portions of the Ocean Man First Nation (Ocean Man 69S, Ocean Man 69N, Ocean Man 69D, Ocean Man 69H, and Ocean Man 69I) and having intersections with both Hwy 701 east of Handsworth and Hwy 711 east of Corning.

Entering the Rural Municipality of Chester No. 125, Hwy 616 joins a short concurrency with westbound Hwy 48 just west of the village of Windthorst to the hamlet of Peebles, where it splits off, crosses Canadian National Railway's Cromer subdivision, and heads north through rural farmland for several kilometres into the Rural Municipality of Elcapo No. 154, entering the town of Grenfell and coming to an end at an intersection with the Trans-Canada Highway (Hwy 1 / Hwy 47), with the road continuing north into town as Range Road 2075. Excluding the concurrency with Hwy 48, which is paved, the entire length of Hwy 616 is a gravel two-lane road.

=== Major intersections ===
From south to north:

Rural municipality	Location	km	mi	Destinations	Notes
Tecumseh No. 65		0.0	0.0	Highway 13 (Red Coat Trail / Ghost Town Trail) – Kisbey, Stoughton Range Road 2072 – Forget, Woodley	Southern terminus; road continues south as Range Road 2072
Tecumseh No. 65 / Golden West No. 95 boundary		13.5	8.4	Bridge over Moose Mountain Creek	
Golden West No. 95	Ocean Man 69D	19.8	12.3	Highway 701 west – Handsworth	Eastern terminus of Hwy 701
Golden West No. 95		33.1	20.6	Highway 711 – Corning, Hazelwood	
Chester No. 125		50.5	31.4	Highway 48 east – Windthorst	Southern end of Hwy 48 concurrency
Chester No. 125	Peebles	56.0	34.8	Highway 48 west – Peebles, Glenavon	Northern end of Hwy 48 concurrency
Elcapo No. 154	Grenfell	84.3	52.4	Highway 1 (TCH) / Highway 47 – Regina, Estevan, Whitewood Range Road 2075 – Grenfell	Northern terminus; road continues north into Grenfell as Range Road 2075
1.000 mi = 1.609 km; 1.000 km = 0.621 mi: Concurrency terminus

== SK 617 ==
Highway 617
- Location: Golden West No. 95, Chester No. 125, Montmartre No. 126, Wolseley No. 155, McLeod No. 185, Stanley No. 215, Garry No. 245, Insinger No. 275, Invermay No. 305, Hazel Dell No. 335
- Length: 262.9 km (163.4 mi)

Highway 617 runs from Highway 49 / Highway 759 at Lintlaw south to Highway 711 12 kilometres (7.5 mi) west of Corning. It runs through the communities of Invermay, Sheho, Parkerview, Goodeve, Lemberg, Wolseley, Candiac, and Glenavon. The highway is approximately 263 kilometres (163 mi) long.

Hwy 617 begins in the Rural Municipality of Golden West No. 95 at an intersection with Hwy 711 several kilometres west of Corning, heading due northward through rural areas to enter the Rural Municipality of Chester No. 125, crossing a bridge over Moose Mountain Creek before entering the village of Glenavon, where it crosses Canadian National Railway's Glenavon and becomes concurrent with westbound Hwy 48. Entering the Rural Municipality of Montmartre No. 126, the pair travel along the north side of the hamlet of Candiac before Hwy 617 splits off and heads north through rural farmland for several kilometres to enter the Rural Municipality of Wolseley No. 155 at the locality of Moffat, crossing a small creek before entering the town of Wolseley along Garnet Street, where it joins a concurrency (overlap) with eastbound Hwy 1 (Trans-Canada Highway). Leaving Wolseley and the Trans-Canada behind, The highway crosses Canadian Pacific Railway's Indian Head subdivision and lowers down into the Qu'Appelle River Valley, where it passes through the hamlet of Ellisboro before crossing a bridge over the river into the Rural Municipality of McLeod No. 185.

Travelling northeast via some switchbacks, Hwy 617 climbs out of the river valley and travels along the south side of the town of Lemberg, where it shares a short concurrency with westbound Hwy 22, before crossing Pheasant Creek just west of the hamlet of Pheasant Forks. The highway crosses both Hwy 10 and Canadian National Railway's Qu'Appelle subdivision halfway between Lorlie and Duff before entering the Rural Municipality of Stanley No. 215, travelling through portions of both the Okanese First Nation and the Star Blanket Cree Nation to have a short concurrency with eastbound Hwy 740 via a switchback and travel through the south side of the town of Goodeve along 1st Avenue, where it crosses Canadian National Railway's Watrous subdivision and shares a concurrency with westbound Hwy 15. After passing by the Thomas Battersby Wildlife Protected Area, Hwy 617 enters the Rural Municipality of Garry No. 245 and head north through rural farmland for several kilometres to cross Hwy 52 at the locality of Homefield and traverse a couple of switchbacks as it travels through more wooded areas, where it passes through the hamlet of Parkerview.

Entering both farmland again and the Rural Municipality of Insinger No. 275, Hwy 617 enters the village of Sheho as it crosses both the Yellowhead Highway (Hwy 16) and Canadian Pacific Railway's Wynyard subdivision, travelling through neighbourhoods on the eastern side of town along Road Allowance before leaving Sheho and curving eastward towards an intersection with Hwy 746, where Hwy 617 curves back northward to enter both woodlands and the Rural Municipality of Invermay No. 305. It goes through a switchback as it passes through the hamlet of Netherton and curves past Newburn Lake, where it crosses the Whitesand River. Re-entering farmland, the highway crosses the narrow isthmus and creek separating Saline Lake and Stonewall Lake to pass through the very western edge of the village of Invermay, where it crosses both Canadian National Railway's Margo subdivision and Hwy 5.

Entering the Rural Municipality of Hazel Dell No. 335, Hwy 617 makes a sharp left turn onto Township Road 342, heading west for several kilometres before making a sharp right turn onto Range Road 2094, having an intersection with Hwy 755 on its way northward through rural farmland to enter the village of Lintlaw and travel through the centre of town along Main Street, where it comes to an end at an intersection with Hwy 49. The road continues north as eastbound Hwy 759. The entire length of Hwy 617, excluding concurrencies with other highways, which are paved, is a two-lane gravel road.

=== Major intersections ===
From south to north:

Rural municipality	Location	km	mi	Destinations	Notes
Golden West No. 95		0.0	0.0	Highway 711 – Corning, Osage	Southern terminus
Chester No. 125		13.2– 13.4	8.2– 8.3	Bridge over Moose Mountain Creek	
Chester No. 125		16.2	10.1	Highway 708 to Highway 47 – Francis	
Chester No. 125	Glenavon	26.2	16.3	Highway 48 east – Peebles Third Street W – Glenavon	Southern end of Hwy 48 concurrency
Montmartre No. 126	Candiac	34.8	21.6	Main Street / Range Road 2101 – Candiac, Calvary Memorial Shrine	
Montmartre No. 126		35.8	22.2	Highway 48 west – Montmartre	Northern end of Hwy 48 concurrency
Wolseley No. 155	Wolseley	57.1	35.5	Highway 1 (TCH) west – Sintaluta, Regina Garnet Street – Wolseley	Southern end of Hwy 1 concurrency
Wolseley No. 155		60.4	37.5	Highway 1 (TCH) east – Grenfell	Northern end of Hwy 1 concurrency
Wolseley No. 155		61.9	38.5	Township Road 172 – Wolseley, Summerberry	
Wolseley No. 155 / McLeod No. 185 boundary	Ellisboro	73.5	45.7	Bridge over the Qu'Appelle River	
McLeod No. 185	Lemberg	96.8	60.1	Highway 22 east – Neudorf	Southern end of Hwy 22 concurrency
McLeod No. 185	Lemberg	98.6	61.3	Highway 22 west – Abernethy	Northern end of Hwy 22 concurrency
McLeod No. 185		104.1	64.7	Bridge over Pheasant Creek	
McLeod No. 185	Okanese 82M	112.8	70.1	Highway 10 – Lorlie, Duff	
Stanley No. 215	Star Blanket 83E	123.0– 123.3	76.4– 76.6	Highway 740 west – Star Blanket 83, Okanese 82	Southern end of Hwy 740 concurrency
Stanley No. 215		125.7	78.1	Highway 740 east – Melville	Northern end of Hwy 740 concurrency
Stanley No. 215	Goodeve	138.1	85.8	Highway 15 east – Fenwood, Melville	Southern end of Hwy 15 concurrency
Stanley No. 215		143.7	89.3	Highway 15 east – Ituna Range Road 2095 – Thomas Battersby Wildlife Protected Area	Northern end of Hwy 15 concurrency
Garry No. 245	Homefield	158.0	98.2	Highway 52 – Willowbrook, Ituna	
Insinger No. 275	Sheho	201.2	125.0	Highway 16 (TCH/YH) – Saskatoon, Yorkton	
Insinger No. 275		204.0	126.8	Highway 746 east	Western terminus of Hwy 746
Invermay No. 305	Netherton	216.4	134.5	Bridge over the Whitesand River	
Invermay No. 305	Invermay	229.3	142.5	Highway 5 – Margo, Rama	
Hazel Dell No. 335		248.7	154.5	Highway 755 (Lone Tree Road) – Wadena, Hazel Dell	
Hazel Dell No. 335	Lintlaw	262.9	163.4	Highway 49 – Nut Mountain, Okla Highway 759 east (Main Street) – Endeavour	Northern terminus; road continues north as eastbound Hwy 759
1.000 mi = 1.609 km; 1.000 km = 0.621 mi: Concurrency terminus

== SK 618 ==
Highway 618
- Location: McLeod No. 185, Stanley No. 215
- Length: 19.1 km (11.9 mi)

Highway 618 runs from Highway 22 halfway between Neudorf and Killaly north to Highway 10 between Duff and Melville. It is entirely a two-lane gravel road and is about 19 kilometres (12 mi) long.

=== Major intersections ===
From south to north:

Rural municipality	Location	km	mi	Destinations	Notes
McLeod No. 185		0.0	0.0	Highway 22 – Neudorf, Killaly	Southern terminus; road continues south as Range Road 2074
Stanley No. 215		19.1	11.9	Highway 10 – Melville, Duff Range Road 2074 – Birmingham	Northern terminus; road continues north as Range Road 2074
1.000 mi = 1.609 km; 1.000 km = 0.621 mi

== SK 619 ==
Highway 619
- Location: Montmartre No. 126, Indian Head No. 156, Abernethy No. 186
- Length: 75.7 km (47.0 mi)

Highway 619 runs from Highway 48 at Kendal to the intersection of Highway 10 (Highway 22) and Highway 310 in Balcarres. Highway 619 is concurrent with Highway 1 (Trans-Canada Highway) for 2 kilometres (1.2 mi) in Indian Head, and later concurrent with Highway 56 for 26 kilometres (16 mi). The highway provides access to Katepwa Lake of the Fishing Lakes. It is about 76 kilometres (47 mi) long.

Hwy 619 begins in the Rural Municipality of Montmartre No. 126 at an intersection with Hwy 48 in the village of Kendal. It heads north along the eastern side of village before leaving Kendal and travelling through farmland before traversing some hilly terrain for a few kilometres (where it crosses Redfox Creek a couple times) to enter the Rural Municipality of Indian Head No. 156. The highway crosses more farmland, as well as Indianhead Creek, as it heads toward the town of Indian Head, where it shares a short concurrency with westbound Hwy 1 (Trans-Canada Highway) on the south side of town before heading north out of town concurrent with Hwy 56. The pair travel through rural areas for the next several kilometres, travelling past Bell Farm and crossing several small creeks before entering the resort village of Katepwa, lowering itself down into the Qu'Appelle River valley and passing through the neighbourhood of Katepwa South (accessed via Katepwa Road) as it curves around the south shore of Katepwa Lake to cross the river into both the Rural Municipality of Abernethy No. 186 and the neighbourhood of Katepwa Beach. Curving around the eastern shore of the lake, the highway passes by numerous lakeside cottages and homes before Hwy 619 splits off and heads east, leaving the lake behind as it climbs its way out of the valley into rural farmland, curving northward through rural areas for several kilometres to enter the town of Balcarres, where it comes to an end on the south side of town at the intersection between Hwy 10 (Hwy 22) and Hwy 310, with the road continuing north as Hwy 310. With the exclusion of concurrencies with other highways, which are paved, the entire length of Hwy 619 is a gravel, two-lane road.

=== Major intersections ===
From south to north:

Rural municipality	Location	km	mi	Destinations	Notes
Montmartre No. 126	Kendal	0.0	0.0	Highway 48 – Montmartre, Odessa	Southern terminus; road continues south as Range Road 2124
Indian Head No. 156	Indian Head	32.3	20.1	Highway 1 (TCH) east – Grenfell	Southern end of both paved section and Hwy 1 concurrency
Indian Head No. 156	Indian Head	33.9	21.1	Highway 1 (TCH) west – Regina Highway 56 begins	Northern end of Hwy 1 concurrency; southern terminus of Hwy 56; southern end of Hwy 56 concurrency
Indian Head No. 156	Katepwa South	54.3	33.7	Katepwa Road – Katepwa South, Lake View Beach, Taylor Beach	
Indian Head No. 156 / Abernethy No. 186 boundary	Katepwa South	55.0	34.2	Bridge over the Qu'Appelle River	
Abernethy No. 186	Katepwa Beach	57.7	35.9	Highway 56 north – Sandy Beach, Lebret, Fort Qu'Appelle	Northern end of both Hwy 56 concurrency and paved section
Abernethy No. 186	Balcarres	75.7	47.0	Highway 10 (Hwy 22) – Regina, Yorkton Highway 310 north – Balcarres, Ituna	Northern terminus; southern terminus of Hwy 310; road continues north as Hwy 310
1.000 mi = 1.609 km; 1.000 km = 0.621 mi: Concurrency terminus

== SK 620 ==
Highway 620
- Location: Francis No. 127, Lajord No. 128, South Qu'Appelle No. 157
- Length: 51.5 km (32.0 mi)

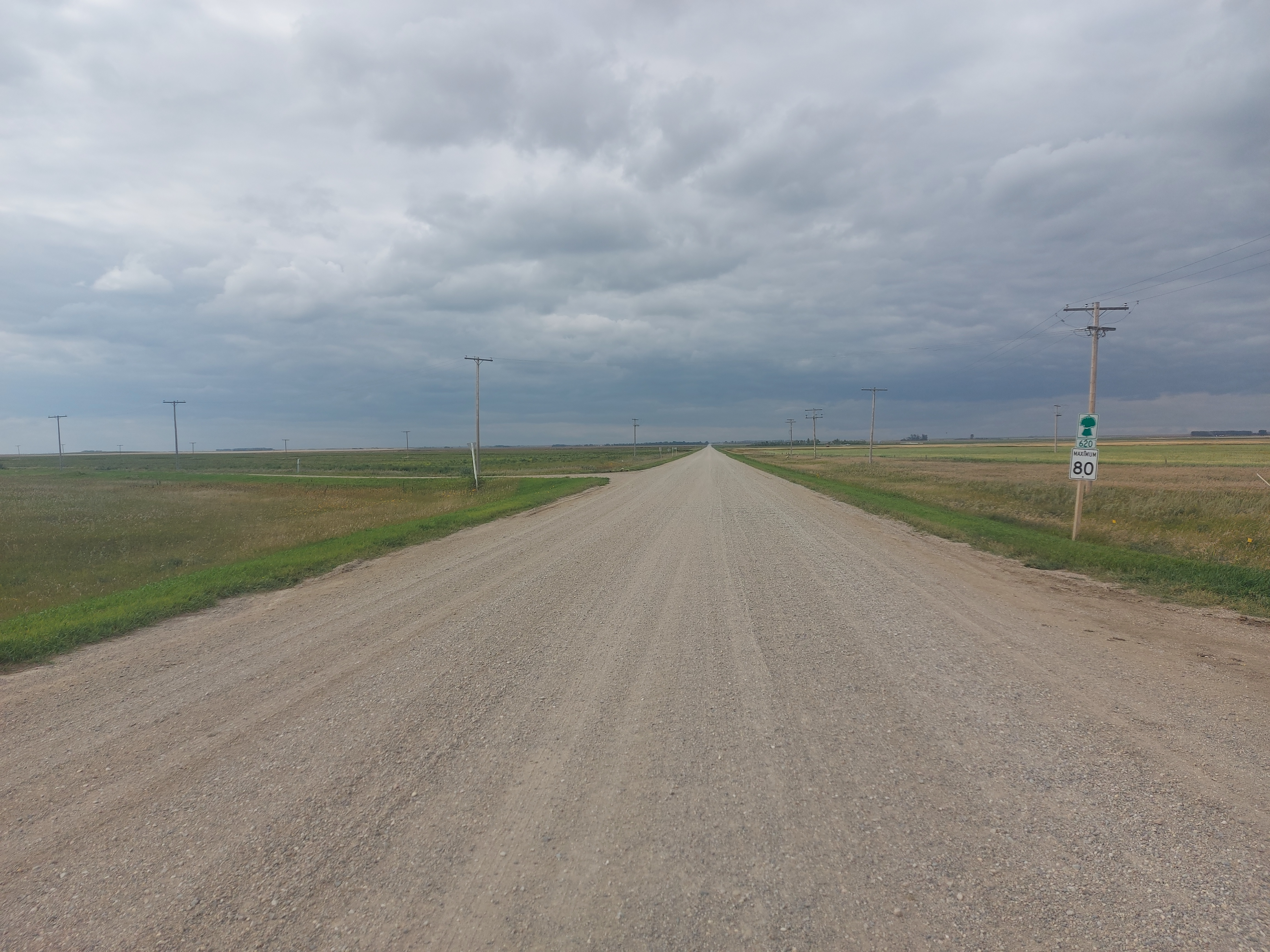
Highway 620

Highway 620 runs from Highway 33 at Sedley north to the intersection of Highway 10 and Highway 734 between Balgonie and Edgeley. It intersects Highways 48 and 1, runs through McLean as Main Street, and crosses Echo Creek. It is about 52 kilometres (32 mi) long.

Hwy 620 begins in the Rural Municipality of Francis No. 127 at an intersection with Hwy 33 in the village of Sedley, with the road continuing south as Range Road 2154. It heads north across the Stewart Southern Railway and through rural farmland for several kilometres, crossing Wascana Creek before joining a concurrency with westbound Hwy 48 just west of Vibank as it crosses Canadian National Railway's Glenavon subdivision. The pair head northwest for a couple kilometres to the border with the Rural Municipality of Lajord No. 128, where Hwy 620 splits off just east of the hamlet of Davin and head northward into the Rural Municipality of South Qu'Appelle No. 157. The highway enters the village of McLean after traversing several kilometres of rural farmland along Main Street, crossing Hwy 1 (Trans-Canada Highway) before travelling straight through the centre of downtown and crossing Canadian Pacific Railway's Indian Head subdivision. Leaving McLean, Hwy 620 heads due north through rural areas, crossing Echo Creek before making a sharp left onto Township Road 190, heading west for a couple kilometres to come to an end at an intersection with Hwy 10, with the road continuing west towards Frankslake and Zehner as westbound Hwy 734. The entire length of Hwy 620, with the exclusion of both the concurrency with Hwy 48 and the section through downtown McLean, which are paved, is a gravel two-lane road.

=== Major intersections ===
From south to north:

Rural municipality	Location	km	mi	Destinations	Notes
Francis No. 127	Sedley	0.0	0.0	Highway 33 – Kronau, Lajord, Francis Range Road 2154 – Sedley	Southern terminus; road continues south as Range Road 2154
Francis No. 127		17.4	10.8	Bridge over Wascana Creek	
Francis No. 127		20.4	12.7	Highway 48 east – Vibank	Southern end of both Hwy 48 concurrency and paved section
Francis No. 127 / Lajord No. 128 boundary		25.8	16.0	Highway 48 west – Davin	Northern end of both Hwy 48 concurrency and paved section
South Qu'Appelle No. 157	McLean	41.9	26.0	Highway 1 (TCH) – Qu'Appelle, Balgonie	Southern end of paved section
South Qu'Appelle No. 157	McLean	42.2	26.2	Northern end of paved section at Railway Avenue	
South Qu'Appelle No. 157		45.1	28.0	Bridge over Echo Creek	
South Qu'Appelle No. 157		51.5	32.0	Highway 10 – Balgonie, Edgeley Highway 734 west – Frankslake	Northern terminus; eastern terminus of Hwy 734; road continues as Hwy 734 westbound
1.000 mi = 1.609 km; 1.000 km = 0.621 mi: Concurrency terminus

== SK 621 ==
Highway 621
- Location: Brokenshell No. 68, Scott No. 98, Lajord No. 128, South Qu'Appelle No. 157
- Length: 104.8 km (65.1 mi)

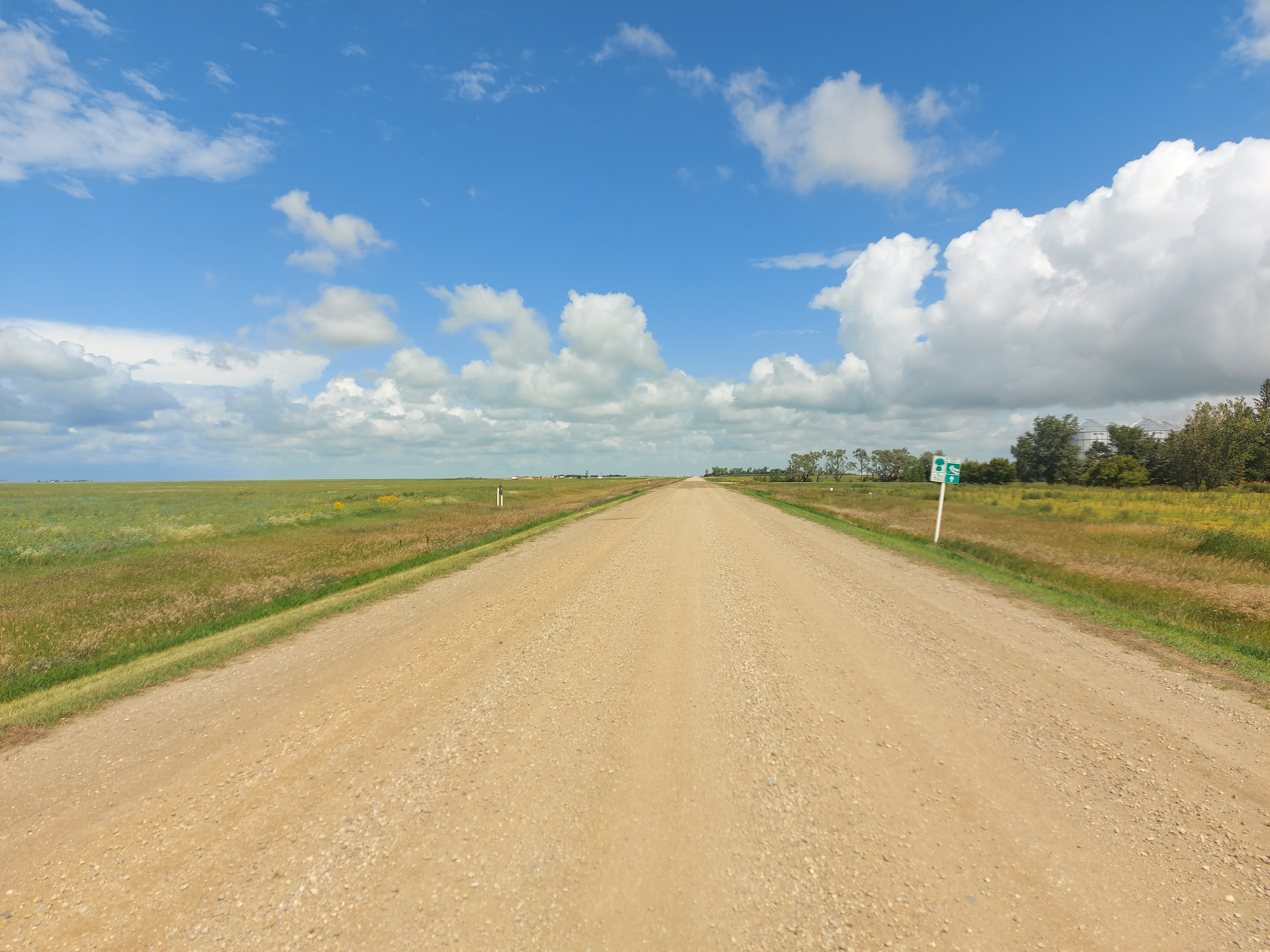
Highway 621 at Yellow Grass

Highway 621 runs from an intersection with Highway 13 (Red Coat Trail / Ghost Town Trail) just northeast of Trossachs to an intersection with the Trans-Canada Highway (Highway 1) on the eastern edge of St. Joseph's. The section of the between Highway 33 at the hamlet of Lajord and the Trans-Canada is unsigned. Highway 621 also provides access to Oyama Regional Park and is approximately 105 kilometres (65 mi) long.

Hwy 621 begins in the Rural Municipality of Brokenshell No. 68 at an intersection with Hwy 13 (Red Coat Trail / Ghost Town Trail) northeast of the hamlet of Trossachs, heading north along Range Road 2170 through a mix of farmland and wooded areas to enter the Rural Municipality of Scott No. 98. It enters the town limits of Yellow Grass, having an intersection with Southern Road (provides access to downtown) before joining a concurrency (overlap) with southbound Hwy 39 (CanAm Highway), with the pair travelling southeast along Railway Avenue through downtown, running parallel to Canadian Pacific Railway's Weyburn subdivision. Hwy 621 now splits off and heads north, leaving Yellow Grass as it crosses the railway and travels through rural farmland for several kilometres to cross the Souris River (via a switchback) and travel through the hamlet of Lewvan, where it meets both Hwy 306 and Hwy 710.

Entering the Rural Municipality of Lajord No. 128, Hwy 621 winds its way northwest through rural areas for several kilometres, where it crosses Wascana Creek, to travel through the western edge of the hamlet of Lajord, where it crosses Hwy 33, Stewart Southern Railway, and Railway Avenue (provides access to downtown). Becoming unsigned, it heads north through farmland to cross Township Road 160 (provides access to Oyama Regional Park), Manybone Creek, and Canadian National Railway's Glenavon subdivision before entering the Rural Municipality of South Qu'Appelle No. 157 at its intersection with Hwy 48. Continuing due north through rural areas, the highway passes just to the east of St. Joseph's (with access via St. Paul Street and Equine Lane) before coming to an end at an intersection with the Trans-Canada Highway (Hwy 1), with the road continuing north as Range Road 2164. The entire length of Hwy 621, with the exclusion of the paved concurrency with the CanAm Highway (Hwy 39), is a gravel two-lane road.

=== Major intersections ===
From south to north:

Rural municipality	Location	km	mi	Destinations	Notes
Brokenshell No. 68		0.0	0.0	Highway 13 (Red Coat Trail / Ghost Town Trail) – Weyburn, Trossachs	Southern terminus; road continues south as Range Road 2170
Scott No. 98	Yellow Grass	14.7	9.1	Southern Road – Yellow Grass	
Scott No. 98		16.4	10.2	Highway 39 north / CanAm Highway – Lang, Regina	Southern end of both paved section and wrong-way Hwy 39 concurrency
Scott No. 98	Yellow Grass	18.4	11.4	Highway 39 south / CanAm Highway – McTaggart, Weyburn	Northern end of both paved section and wrong-way concurrency with Hwy 39
Scott No. 98		27.1	16.8	Bridge over the Souris River	
Scott No. 98		40.0	24.9	Lewvan (Farr Air) Airport access road	
Scott No. 98		42.4	26.3	Bridge over the Souris River	
Scott No. 98	Lewvan	43.6	27.1	To Highway 710 west – Milestone	
Scott No. 98	Lewvan	43.7	27.2	Highway 306 – Riceton, Colfax	
Lajord No. 128		67.9	42.2	Bridge over Wascana Creek	
Lajord No. 128	Lajord	75.4	46.9	Highway 33 – Kronau, Sedley	Hwy 621 becomes unsigned
Lajord No. 128	Lajord	75.5	46.9	Railway Avenue – Lajord	
Lajord No. 128		83.0	51.6	Township Road 160 – Oyama Regional Park	
Lajord No. 128		86.1	53.5	Bridge over Manybone Creek	
Lajord No. 128 / South Qu'Appelle No. 157 boundary		92.7	57.6	Highway 48 – Regina, Davin	
South Qu'Appelle No. 157		103.2	64.1	St. Paul Street – St. Joseph's	
South Qu'Appelle No. 157		104.0	64.6	Equine Lane – St. Joseph's	
South Qu'Appelle No. 157		104.8	65.1	Highway 1 (TCH) – Balgonie, McLean	Northern terminus; road continues north as Range Road 2164
1.000 mi = 1.609 km; 1.000 km = 0.621 mi: Concurrency terminus

== SK 622 ==
Highway 622
- Location: Lajord No. 128, Edenwold No. 158
- Length: 43.9 km (27.3 mi)

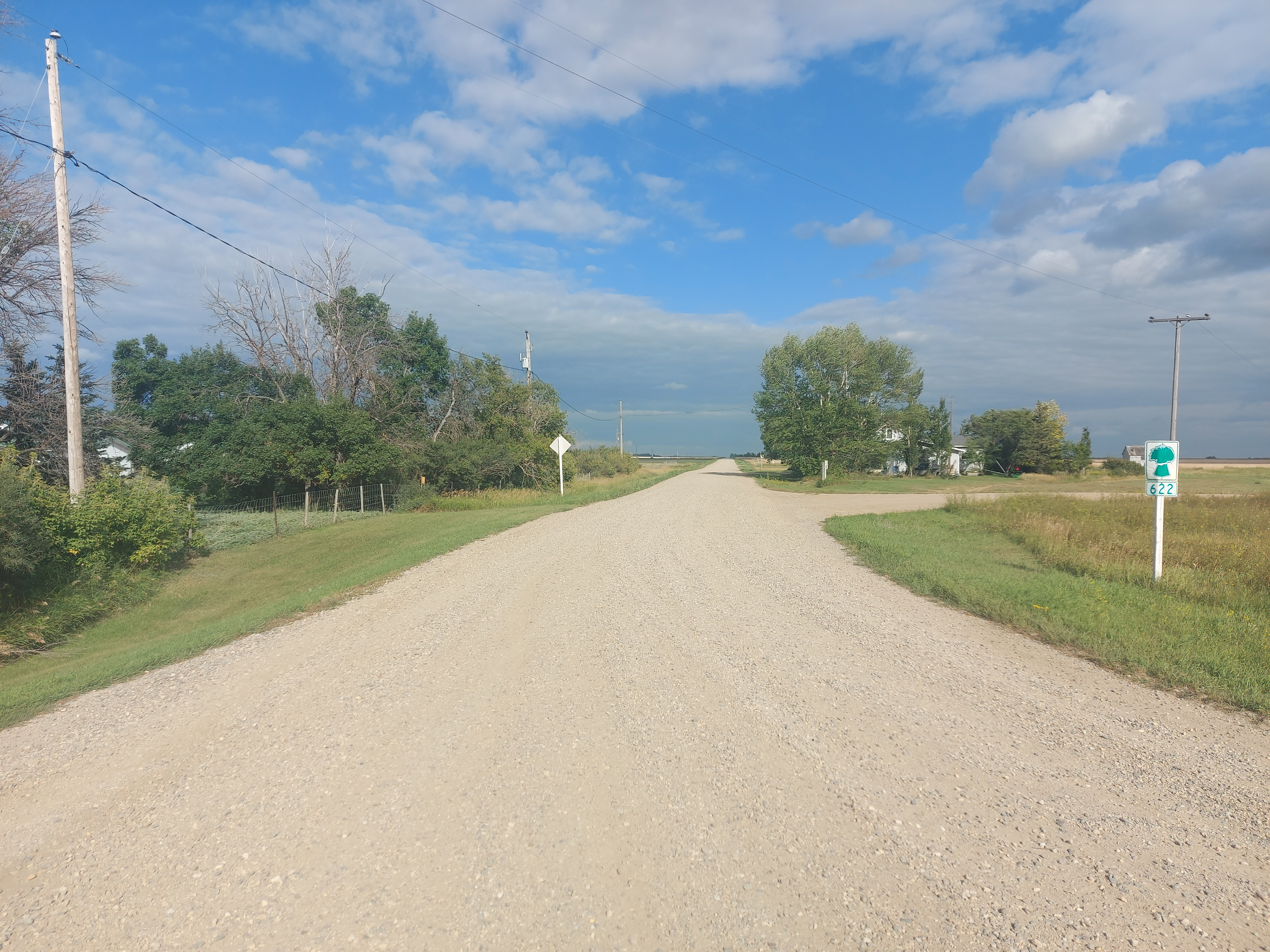
Highway 622 in Kronau

Highway 622 runs from Highway 306 at Riceton, across Highway 33, through Kronau, to the Highway 1 / Highway 46 intersection near Balgonie. It is about 44 kilometres (27 mi) long.

Hwy 622 begins in the Rural Municipality of Lajord No. 128 on the eastern edge of the hamlet of Riceton at an intersection with Hwy 306, heading north along Range Road 2175 to travel through rural farmland for several kilometres, traversing a short switchback and crossing bridges over both Wascana Creek and Manybone Creek to enter the hamlet of Kronau, where it travels along the western side of town to cross both Hwy 33 and the Stewart Southern Railway into the Rural Municipality of Edenwold No. 158. Leaving Kronau, Hwy 622 turns east for a short distance along Township Road 160 before turning back north along Range Road 2173 across Kronau Creek to travel through far for a few kilometres to have pass through the locality of Jameson, where it crosses the Canadian National Railway's Glenavon subdivision, and have an intersection with Hwy 48. Entering the outskirts of the town of Balgonie, the road curves west a short distance before coming to an end at the interchange between the Trans-Canada Highway (Hwy 1, Exit 217) and Hwy 46, with the road continuing northwest as Hwy 46. The entire length of Hwy 622 is a gravel two-lane road.

=== Major intersections ===
From south to north:

Rural municipality	Location	km	mi	Destinations	Notes
Lajord No. 128		0.0	0.0	Highway 306 – Riceton, Lewvan	Southern terminus; road continues south as Range Road 2175
Lajord No. 128		15.5	9.6	Bridge over Wascana Creek	
Lajord No. 128		20.1	12.5	Bridge over Manybone Creek	
Lajord No. 128	Kronau	22.5	14.0	Main Street – Kronau	
Lajord No. 128	Kronau	23.2	14.4	Railway Avenue – Kronau	
Lajord No. 128	Kronau	23.3	14.5	Highway 33 – Regina, Lajord	Hwy 622 curves right onto Township Road 160
Edenwold No. 158		25.0	15.5	Hwy 622 makes a left and heads north along Range Road 2173	
Edenwold No. 158		25.7	16.0	Bridge over Kronau Creek	
Edenwold No. 158	Jameson	36.2	22.5	Highway 48 – White City, Davin	
Edenwold No. 158	Balgonie	43.9	27.3	Highway 1 (TCH) – Regina, Winnipeg Highway 46 west to Highway 364 – Balgonie, Edenwold	Hwy 1 Exit 217; northern terminus; eastern terminus of Hwy 46; road continues north as westbound Hwy 46
1.000 mi = 1.609 km; 1.000 km = 0.621 mi

== SK 623 ==
Highway 623
- Location: Key West No. 70, Elmsthorpe No. 100, Redburn No. 130, Pense No. 160
- Length: 95.6 km (59.4 mi)

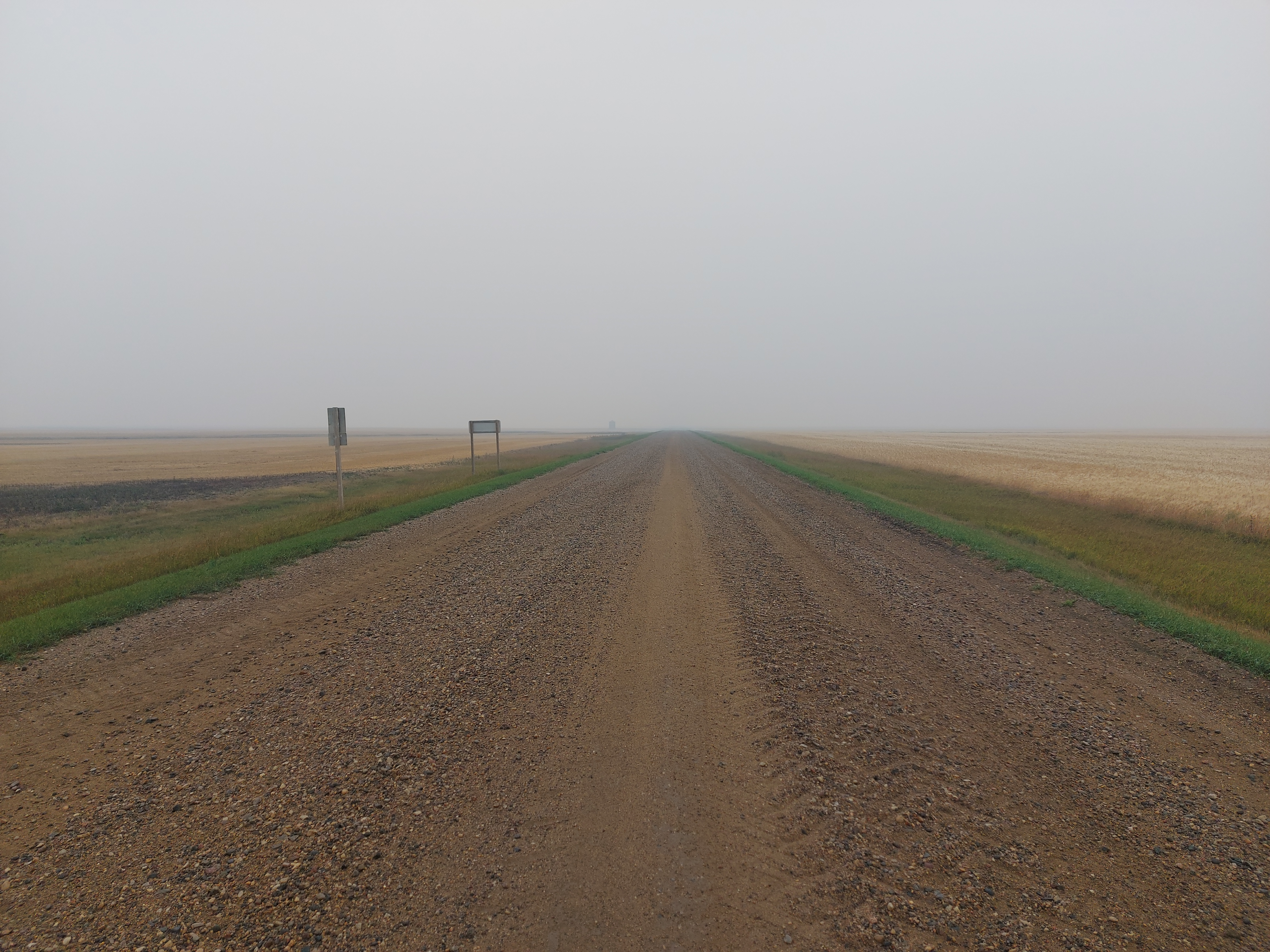
Highway 623 north-west of Rouleau

Highway 623 runs from Highway 1 south of Pense to Highway 13 at Ogema. It crosses, and has a 2-kilometre Concurrency with, Highway 39 north-west of Rouleau. The highway runs through the RMs of Key West No. 70 and Elmsthorpe No. 100 and the Piapot 75H Indian reserve. The communities of Ogema and Truax are located along the route. Access to Ogema Regional Park is at the southern terminus of Highway 623, on the southern side of Ogema. It is about 96 kilometres (60 mi) long.

Hwy 623 begins in the Rural Municipality of Key West No. 70 in the town of Ogema at an intersection with Hwy 13 (Red Coat Trail / Ghost Town Trail) on the south side of town, with the road continuing south as Range Road 2223. It heads north as a paved two-lane road past the main entrance to Ogema Regional Park and across the Red Coat Road and Rail to travel through neighbourhoods along the western side of town before the pavement transitions to gravel at the intersection with Main Street, with the highway leaving Ogema shortly thereafter. After travelling through rural farmland for several kilometres, Hwy 623 crosses into the Rural Municipality of Elmsthorpe No. 100 at an intersection with the western end of Hwy 712 within a section of the Piapot First Nation reserve, travelling through the reserve for a few kilometres before leaving it as the road goes through a switchback. The highway runs through the eastern side of the hamlet of Truax, where it crosses a former railway line (now abandoned section of Southern Rails Cooperative), and crosses a bridge over Avonlea Creek before having a short concurrency (overlap) with westbound Hwy 334 just immediately east of the town of Avonlea. Hwy 623 splits off and travels northward into the Rural Municipality of Redburn No. 130 through rural areas, crossing a second bridge over Avonlea Creek before crossing a bridge over the Moose Jaw River and having a short concurrency with Hwy 39 northbound between the town of Rouleau and the hamlet of Pitman, where it crosses Canadian Pacific Railway's Weyburn subdivision. The highway heads due northward for a couple kilometres, entering the Rural Municipality of Pense No. 160 to come to an at an intersection between the Trans-Canada Highway (Hwy 1) and the southern end of Hwy 641, with the road continuing north into the town of Pense as northbound Hwy 641. With the exception of the section Hwy 623 that is within Ogema, as well as its concurrencies with other highways, all of which are paved, the entire length of Hwy 623 is a gravel, two-lane road.

=== Major intersections ===
From south to north:

Rural municipality	Location	km	mi	Destinations	Notes
Key West No. 70	Ogema	0.0	0.0	Highway 13 (Red Coat Trail / Ghost Town Trail) – Pangman, Horizon	Southern terminus; southern end of paved section; road continues south as Range Road 2223
Key West No. 70	Ogema	0.2	0.12	Ogema Regional Park main entrance	Access road into park
Key West No. 70	Ogema	1.2	0.75	North Road / Main Street	Northern end of paved section
Key West No. 70 / Elmsthorpe No. 100 boundary	Piapot 75J	23.8	14.8	Highway 712 east – Parry	Western terminus of Hwy 712
Elmsthorpe No. 100	Piapot 75E / Piapot 75J	30.0– 30.5	18.6– 19.0	Township Road 104 – Dummer	
Elmsthorpe No. 100	Truax	38.1	23.7	Township Road 112 to Highway 334 – Kayville, Avonlea	
Elmsthorpe No. 100	Truax	38.3	23.8	Railway Avenue – Truax	
Elmsthorpe No. 100		41.9	26.0	Bridge over Avonlea Creek	
Elmsthorpe No. 100		47.8	29.7	Township Road 122 – Dunnet Regional Park	
Elmsthorpe No. 100		51.1	31.8	Highway 334 east – Corinne	Southern end of both Hwy 334 concurrency and paved section
Elmsthorpe No. 100		52.7	32.7	Highway 334 west – Avonlea	Northern end of both Hwy 334 concurrency and paved section
Redburn No. 130		66.1	41.1	Bridge over Avonlea Creek	
Redburn No. 130		70.0	43.5	Bridge over the Moose Jaw River	
Redburn No. 130		74.8	46.5	Highway 39 south – Rouleau	Southern end of both Hwy 39 concurrency and paved section
Redburn No. 130		76.7	47.7	Highway 39 north – Pitman, Drinkwater	Northern end of both Hwy 39 concurrency and paved section
Pense No. 160		95.6	59.4	Highway 1 (TCH) – Belle Plain, Regina Highway 641 north – Pense	Northern terminus; southern terminus of Hwy 641; road continues as northbound Hwy 641
1.000 mi = 1.609 km; 1.000 km = 0.621 mi: Concurrency terminus

== SK 624 ==
Highway 624
- Location: Edenwold No. 158
- Length: 60.4 km (37.5 mi)

Highway 624 runs approximately 60.4 kilometres (37.5 mi) from Hwy 33 near Richardson northwards to Hwy 640 in the Muscowpetung 80 Indian Reserve, entirely located within the Rural Municipality of Edenwold No. 158. It crosses the Trans-Canada Highway (Hwy 1) at Exit 229 in Emerald Park and passes through the hamlet of Zehner. The highway is paved between the communities of Emerald Park and Pilot Butte, with the rest of the route being a two-lane gravel road.

Hwy 624 begins at a junction with Hwy 33 just east of the hamlet of Richardson, located a few kilometres southeast of the city of Regina. It heads due north as a two-lane gravel road, immediately crossing the Stewart Southern Railway as it passes through rural farmland along Range Road 2183 to enter the western extremities of Emerald Park, where it crosses the Canadian National Railway's Glenavon subdivision, asphalt begins, and makes a sharp left turn onto S Plains Road, running parallel to the Trans-Canada Highway (Hwy 1) for 1.8 kilometres (1.1 mi) to a roundabout, where it makes a right onto the Pilot Butte Access Road (Range Road 2184) and crosses the Trans-Canada via an interchange (Exit 229), where Hwy 362 begins. Hwy 624 / Hwy 362 head north concurrently through residential areas for 4.2 kilometres (2.6 mi), crossing Canadian Pacific Railway's Indian Head subdivision as they travel along the western side of Pilot Butte, where Hwy 362 ends at the junction with Hwy 46 while Hwy 624 continues north along gravel. Hwy 624 shares a short concurrency with westbound Hwy 734 as it passes through the hamlet of Zehner, where it crosses Canadian National Railway's Qu'Appelle subdivision, before travelling northward through rural areas, crossing Hwy 729 before passing through the Piapot 75 Indian Reserve, curving eastward as the highway winds down in elevation into the Qu'Appelle River valley. Running along the south bank of the river, Hwy 624 now enters the Muscowpetung 80 Indian Reserve, coming to an end shortly thereafter at an intersection with Hwy 640.

Prior to the freeway conversion of the Trans-Canada (Hwy 1) between the Regina Bypass and Balgonie, Hwy 624 shared a short concurrency with Hwy 1 westbound between Emerald Park and Hwy 362. When that project was completed, Hwy 624 was rerouted onto S Plains Road.

=== Major intersections ===
From south to north:

Rural municipality	Location	km	mi	Destinations	Notes
Edenwold No. 158		0.0	0.0	Highway 33 – Kronau, Regina	Southern terminus; road continues south as Range Road 2183
Edenwold No. 158		6.6	4.1	Southern end of paved section at railway crossing	
Edenwold No. 158	Emerald Park	9.1	5.7	To Highway 1 (TCH) east – Winnipeg S Plains Road – Emerald Park	Eastbound exit and entrance on Hwy 1; Hwy 1 Exit 227
Edenwold No. 158		11.2– 11.6	7.0– 7.2	Highway 1 (TCH) – Regina, Winnipeg Highway 362 begins	Diverging Diamond Interchange; Hwy 1 Exit 229; southern terminus of Hwy 362; southern end of Hwy 362 concurrency
Edenwold No. 158	Pilot Butte	14.7	9.1	1st Avenue – Pilot Butte	
Edenwold No. 158	Pilot Butte	15.6	9.7	Highway 46 – Regina, Balgonie Highway 362 ends	Northern terminus of Hwy 362; northern end of Hwy 362 concurrency
Edenwold No. 158		18.7	11.6	Northern end of paved section at Township Road 182	
Edenwold No. 158	Zehner	25.2	15.7	Highway 734 east – Frankslake	Southern end of Hwy 734 concurrency
Edenwold No. 158	Zehner	26.6	16.5	Highway 734 west to CanAm Highway / Highway 6 – Brora	Northern end of Hwy 734 concurrency
Edenwold No. 158		39.6	24.6	Highway 729 – Craven, Edenwold	
Edenwold No. 158	Muscowpetung 80	60.4	37.5	Highway 640 – Cupar, Edenwold	Northern terminus; road continues east as an unnamed gravel road into the reservation
1.000 mi = 1.609 km; 1.000 km = 0.621 mi: Concurrency terminus; Incomplete access

== SK 625 ==
Highway 625
- Location: Swift Current No. 137
- Length: 20.4 km (12.7 mi)

Highway 625 runs Highway 721 north to Highway 1 (Trans-Canada Highway) on the west side of Swift Current. The highway connects, via Range Road 3143 and Hwy 343, the city with Lac Pelletier Regional Park. It lies entirely within the Rural Municipality of Swift Current No. 137 and is about 20 kilometres (12 mi) long. Hwy 625 includes a bridge across Swift Current Creek.

=== Major intersections ===
From south to north:

Rural municipality	Location	km	mi	Destinations	Notes
Swift Current No. 137		0.0	0.0	Highway 721 – Simmie, Wymark Range Road 3143 to Highway 343 – Lac Pelletier Regional Park	Southern terminus; southern end of unpaved section; road continues south as Range Road 3143
Swift Current No. 137		14.1	8.8	Bridge over Swift Current Creek	
Swift Current No. 137		19.6	12.2	Township Road 154 / South Railway Street SW	Northern end of unpaved section
Swift Current No. 137		20.4	12.7	Highway 1 (TCH) – Medicine Hat, Swift Current	Northern terminus; road continues north for a short distance to a service road as Range Road 3142
1.000 mi = 1.609 km; 1.000 km = 0.621 mi

== SK 626 ==
Highway 626
- Location: Rodgers No. 133, Wheatlands No. 163
- Length: 41.5 km (25.8 mi)

Highway 626 runs from Highway 1 at Mortlach south to Highway 363 at Old Wives Lake. It is about 41.5 kilometres (25.8 mi) long.

Hwy 626 begins in the Rural Municipality of Rodgers No. 133 at an intersection with Hwy 363 on the northwestern shore of Old Wives Lake, roughly 5 kilometres (3.1 mi) east of Courval. It winds its way northward through rural prairie lands as a gravel two-lane road for several kilometres, passing through the locality of Eastleigh before entering the Rural Municipality of Wheatlands No. 163. It joins a concurrency (overlap) with eastbound Hwy 735 (Township Road 163), with the pair curving northward onto Range Road 3020 through farmland before making a sharp right onto Township Road 170 after a few kilometres. Hwy 626 splits off and heads north along Range Road 3013, entering the village of Mortlach along Saskatchewan Street to cross Canadian Pacific Railway's Swift Current subdivision and travel through neighbourhoods along the western side of town. The highway makes a right onto Alexandra Avenue, passing just to the north of downtown to make a left onto Rose Street, where it gains asphalt pavement as it heads north of town to come to an end at an intersection with the Trans-Canada Highway (Hwy 1). The road continues north as Eskbank Road (Range Road 3013).

=== Major intersections ===
From south to north:

Rural municipality	Location	km	mi	Destinations	Notes
Rodgers No. 133		0.0	0.0	Highway 363 – Courval, Moose Jaw	Southern terminus
Wheatlands No. 163		20.8	12.9	Highway 735 west (Township Road 163)	Southern end of Hwy 735 concurrency
Wheatlands No. 163		33.6	20.9	Highway 735 east (Township Road 170) – Boharm	Northern end of Hwy 735 concurrency
Wheatlands No. 163	Mortlach	40.5	25.2	Alexandra Avenue / Rose Street	Southern end of paved section
Wheatlands No. 163	Mortlach	41.5	25.8	Highway 1 (TCH) – Swift Current, Moose Jaw	Northern terminus; northern end of town paved section; road continues north as Eskbank Road (Range Road 3013)
1.000 mi = 1.609 km; 1.000 km = 0.621 mi: Concurrency terminus

== SK 627 ==
Highway 627
- Location: Sutton No. 103, Rodgers No. 133, Wheatlands No. 163, Eyebrow No. 193, Huron No. 223, Willner No. 253
- Length: 158.6 km (98.5 mi)

Highway 627 runs from Highway 749 south to Highway 43 at Palmer. The highway crosses three major rivers, including the Qu'Appelle River at Eyebrow Lake, Thunder Creek, and Wood River. Major highways it intersects with include the Trans-Canada Highway and Highway 42. It is about 158.6 kilometres (98.5 mi) long.

Hwy 627 begins in the Rural Municipality of Sutton No. 103, just immediately to the northwest of the hamlet of Palmer, at a junction with Hwy 43, heading north through rural farmland for a few kilometres to cross Hwy 718 shortly before entering the Rural Municipality of Rodgers No. 133. After crossing a bridge over the Wood River at the site of the former Wood Valley School, roughly 7 kilometres (4.3 mi) east of Shamrock Regional Park, the highway travels through the eastern edge of the village of Coderre to become concurrent with eastbound Hwy 363 for a short distance, with the pair crossing a bridge over Chaplin Creek together. Hwy 627 now splits off and winds its way northeast through prairie lands via Range Road 3033, Township Road 152, Range Road 3035, Township Road 160, Range Road 3034, Township Road 162, Range Road 3032, and Township Road 163, where it enters the Rural Municipality of Wheatlands No. 163 and comes to an intersection with the western end of Hwy 735, with Hwy 627 turning left and heading north along Range Road 3025.

Hwy 627 enters the hamlet of Parkbeg and winding through hilly terrain for a few kilometres, travelling through town along Railway Avenue before making an abrupt sharp right turn onto Range Road 3030 to cross both Canadian Pacific Railway's Swift Current subdivision and the Trans-Canada Highway (Hwy 1), which has a rather wide median (almost 1 kilometre (0.62 mi)) at this particular point. Leaving Parkbeg behind, the highway enters the Rural Municipality of Eyebrow No. 193, crossing Thunder Creek and travelling just to the east of the hamlet of Darmody to have an intersection with Hwy 42 west of the village of Eyebrow.

Entering the Rural Municipality of Huron No. 223, it travels through the eastern edge of the village of Tugaske, where it crosses both Hwy 367 and Canadian Pacific Railway's Outlook subdivision, before winding its way northeast through farmland to cross a bridge over the Qu'Appelle River at western reaches of Eyebrow Lake. After crossing into the Rural Municipality of Willner No. 253, the highway comes to an end shortly thereafter at an intersection with Hwy 749 roughly halfway between Elbow and Girvin. With the exclusion of the concurrency (overlap) with Hwy 363 and the section within Parkbeg along Railway Avenue, both of which are paved, the entire length of Hwy 627 is a two-lane gravel road.

=== Major intersections ===
From south to north:

Rural municipality	Location	km	mi	Destinations	Notes
Sutton No. 103		0.0	0.0	Highway 43 – Palmer, Mazenod, Gravelbourg	Southern terminus
Sutton No. 103		13.0	8.1	Highway 718 – Bateman, Mazenod	
Rodgers No. 133		22.1	13.7	Bridge over the Wood River	
Rodgers No. 133		22.7	14.1	Township Road 132 – Shamrock Regional Park	
Rodgers No. 133	Coderre	29.2	18.1	Central Avenue – Coderre	
Rodgers No. 133		32.0	19.9	Highway 363 west – Shamrock	Southern end of both Hwy 363 concurrency and paved section
Rodgers No. 133		32.6	20.3	Bridge over Chaplin Creek	
Rodgers No. 133		33.6	20.9	Highway 363 east – Courval	Northern end of both Hwy 363 and paved section
Rodgers No. 133 / Wheatlands No. 163 boundary		52.8	32.8	Township Road 160 – Secretan	Hwy 627 turns right
Wheatlands No. 163		66.9	41.6	Highway 735 east – Mortlach	Western terminus of Hwy 735
Wheatlands No. 163	Parkbeg	78.5	48.8	Range Road 3030 to Highway 1 (TCH)	Southern end of paved section
Wheatlands No. 163	Parkbeg	80.0– 80.7	49.7– 50.1	Highway 1 (TCH) – Swift Current, Moose Jaw	Northern end of paved section; Hwy 1 has a nearly 1 kilometre (0.62 mi) median
Eyebrow No. 193		102.4	63.6	Bridge over Thunder Creek	
Eyebrow No. 193	Darmody	108.6	67.5	Darmody access road	
Eyebrow No. 193		112.3	69.8	Township Road 210 – Mawer	
Eyebrow No. 193		118.8	73.8	Highway 42 – Central Butte, Eyebrow	
Huron No. 223	Tugaske	126.3	78.5	Highway 367 – Bridgeford, Eyebrow	
Huron No. 223		141.4	87.9	Bridge over the Qu'Appelle River	
Huron No. 223		148.9	92.5	Highway 732 east – Craik	Western terminus of Hwy 732
Willner No. 253		158.6	98.5	Highway 749 – Elbow, Girvin	Northern terminus; road continues north as Range Road 3023
1.000 mi = 1.609 km; 1.000 km = 0.621 mi: Concurrency terminus

== SK 628 ==
Highway 628
- Location: Glen McPherson No. 46, Auvergne No. 76, Whiska Creek No. 106, Coulee No. 136, Excelsior No. 166
- Length: 164.5 km (102.2 mi)

Highway 628 runs from Highway 18 in the Rural Municipality of Glen McPherson No. 46 to Beaver Flat on Lake Diefenbaker, passing through the towns of Ponteix, Pambrun, and Waldeck. It also provides access to Notukeu Regional Park and the Millar College of the Bible. The highway is approximately 164.5 kilometres (102.2 mi) long.

Hwy 628 begins in the Rural Municipality of Glen McPherson No. 46 at an intersection with Hwy 18, roughly 5.5 kilometres (3.4 mi) northwest of Broncho. It heads north through rural prairie lands along gravel for several kilometres to enter the Rural Municipality of Auvergne No. 76, traversing a switchback as it crosses over Pinto Creek and gains asphalt for several kilometres to enter the town of Ponteix after crossing Hwy 13 (Red Coat Trail / Ghost Town Trail). The highway travels through the western part of town along 4th Street W, passing through neighbourhoods just to the west of downtown before leaving Ponteix at an intersection with Railway Avenue (provides access to Notukeu Regional Park) and crossing over both the Great Western Railway's Shaunavon subdivision and Notukeu Creek. With the pavement transitioning back to gravel Hwy 628 continues north into the Rural Municipality of Whiska Creek No. 106, traversing a switchback and crossing a bridge over Russell Creek before entering the hamlet of Pambrun at an intersection with Hwy 43, with the road continuing into town and towards the Millar College of the Bible as Pangman Street while Hwy 628 joins a concurrency with eastbound Hwy 43. After roughly 1.6 kilometres (0.99 mi), Hwy 628 splits off and heads north, crossing the Vanguard subdivision of the Great Western Railway as it leaves Pambrun continues through rural areas for the next several kilometres, entering the Rural Municipality of Coulee No. 136 and crossing Hwy 721 just west of Braddock before sharing an extremely short concurrency with westbound Hwy 363.

Continuing on into the Rural Municipality of Excelsior No. 166, joining a several kilometre long concurrency with the Trans-Canada Highway (Hwy 1) to the village of Waldeck, with Hwy 628 splitting off and travelling through the eastern side of town, where it crosses both Canadian Pacific Railway's Swift Current subdivision and a bridge over Swift Current Creek. Leaving Waldeck, the highway continues north through rural areas for several kilometres, crossing a second bridge over Swift Current Creek and having an intersection with Hwy 736 before joining a concurrency with westbound Hwy 738 for a few kilometres. Hwy 628 now splits off and heads north, winding its way down into the South Saskatchewan River valley to enter the resort village of Beaver Flat, where the highway comes to an end near the shoreline of Lake Diefenbaker at an intersection with Steele Street. With the exception of the paved section through Ponteix, as well as the concurrencies with other highways, which are paved, the entire length of Hwy 628 is a gravel two-lane road.

=== Major intersections ===
From south to north:

Rural municipality	Location	km	mi	Destinations	Notes
Glen McPherson No. 46	Glen McPherson	0.0	0.0	Highway 18 – Val Marie, Mankota	Southern terminus; road continues as westbound Hwy 18
Auvergne No. 76		11.2	7.0	Bridge over Pinto Creek	
Auvergne No. 76		24.8	15.4	Southern end of paved section	
Auvergne No. 76		32.6	20.3	Highway 13 (Red Coat Trail / Ghost Town Trail) – Cadillac, Aneroid	
Auvergne No. 76	Ponteix	33.8	21.0	Centre Street – Ponteix	Hwy 628 makes a slight left
Auvergne No. 76	Ponteix	35.1	21.8	Railway Avenue – Ponteix, Notukeu Regional Park	Northern end of paved section
Auvergne No. 76	Ponteix	35.8	22.2	Bridge over Notukeu Creek	
Whiska Creek No. 106	Pambrun	57.4	35.7	Highway 43 west – Neville Pangman Street – Pambrun, Millar College of the Bible	Southern end of both paved section and Hwy 43 concurrency
Whiska Creek No. 106	Pambrun	59.0	36.7	Highway 43 east – Vanguard	Northern end of both paved section and Hwy 43 concurrency
Coulee No. 136		78.4	48.7	Highway 721 – Wymark, Braddock, Hodgeville	
Coulee No. 136		97.2– 93.5	60.4– 58.1	Highway 363 – Swift Current, Neidpath	Extremely short concurrency / paved section with westbound Hwy 363
Excelsior No. 166		112.0	69.6	Highway 1 (TCH) east – Rush Lake, Moose Jaw	Southern end of both paved section and Hwy 1 concurrency
Excelsior No. 166	Waldeck	121.1	75.2	Highway 1 (TCH) west – Swift Current	Northern end of both paved section and Hwy 1 concurrency
Excelsior No. 166		122.5	76.1	Bridge over Swift Current Creek	
Excelsior No. 166		126.4	78.5	Bridge over Swift Current Creek	
Excelsior No. 166		136.7	84.9	Highway 736 west (Leinan Road / Township Road 181) – Leinan	Eastern terminus of Hwy 736
Excelsior No. 166		138.3	85.9	Prairie View Road (Township Road 182) – Prairie View	
Excelsior No. 166		145.5	90.4	Highway 738 east (Township Road 190) – Main Centre	Southern end of Hwy 738 concurrency; the pair turn left onto Range Road 3122
Excelsior No. 166		155.2	96.4	Highway 738 west (Main Centre Road / Township Road 192) – Stewart Valley	Northern end of Hwy 738 concurrency
Excelsior No. 166	Beaver Flat	164.5	102.2	Steele Street	Northern terminus
1.000 mi = 1.609 km; 1.000 km = 0.621 mi: Concurrency terminus

== SK 629 ==
Highway 629
- Location: Fertile Belt No. 183, Saltcoats No. 213
- Length: 33.4 km (20.8 mi)

Highway 629 runs from the Yellowhead Highway (Highway 16) between Rokeby and Saltcoats south to 1 Ave at Atwater, crossing Highway 15 roughly halfway along its journey. It is about 33.4 kilometres (20.8 mi) long and is entirely a two-lane gravel road.

=== Major intersections ===
From south to north:

Rural municipality	Location	km	mi	Destinations	Notes
Fertile Belt No. 183	Atwater	0.0	0.0	1st Avenue – Atwater Township Road 210 – Bangor	Southern terminus; road continues south as Range Road 2024
Saltcoats No. 213		15.3	9.5	Highway 15 – Melville, Churchbridge	
Saltcoats No. 213		33.4	20.8	Highway 16 (TCH/YH) – Rokeby, Saltcoats	Northern terminus
1.000 mi = 1.609 km; 1.000 km = 0.621 mi

== SK 630 ==
Highway 630
- Location: Lac Pelletier No. 107, Swift Current No. 137
- Length: 26.7 km (16.6 mi)

Highway 630 runs from Highway 343 north to the Trans-Canada Highway (Highway 1) near Beverley. The highway passes near the community of Duncairn and provides access to Duncairn Dam. It is about 27 kilometres (17 mi) long.

Hwy 630 begins in the Rural Municipality of Lac Pelletier No. 107 at an intersection with Hwy 343 at the locality of Vesper, located between Simmie and Lac Pelletier. It heads north into the Rural Municipality of Swift Current No. 137, travelling past the locality of Duncairn and the Duncairn Dam (both accessible via Township Road 132) before having an intersection with eastbound Hwy 721 and crossing a bridge over Swift Current Creek. The highway continues north through rural farmland for several kilometres, crossing some hilly terrain to have an intersection with the former alignment of Hwy 1 (provides access to the hamlet of Beverley) before crossing Canadian Pacific Railway's Maple Creek subdivision and coming to an end at an intersection with the Trans-Canada Highway (Hwy 1). The entire length of Hwy 630 is a gravel, two-lane road.

=== Major intersections ===
From south to north:

Rural municipality	Location	km	mi	Destinations	Notes
Lac Pelletier No. 107	Vesper	0.0	0.0	Highway 343 – Darlings Beach, Lac Pelletier Regional Park, Simmie	Southern terminus; road continues south as westbound Hwy 343
Swift Current No. 137		6.5	4.0	Township Road 132 – Duncairn, Duncairn Dam	
Swift Current No. 137		9.4	5.8	Highway 721 east – Wymark	Western terminus of Hwy 721
Swift Current No. 137		9.5	5.9	Bridge over Swift Current Creek	
Swift Current No. 137		25.4	15.8	Old Highway 1 – Webb, Beverley	
Swift Current No. 137		26.7	16.6	Highway 1 (TCH) – Medicine Hat, Swift Current	Northern terminus
1.000 mi = 1.609 km; 1.000 km = 0.621 mi

== SK 631 ==
Highway 631
- Location: Bone Creek No. 108, Webb No. 138, Gull Lake No. 139
- Length: 68.0 km (42.3 mi)

Highway 631 runs from Highway 13 at Scotsguard north to Highway 37 in Gull Lake. The highway passes near the communities of Simmie and Ferguson Bay, as well as providing access to Reid Lake. It is about 68 kilometres (42 mi) long.

Hwy 631 begins in the Rural Municipality of Bone Creek No. 108 at an intersection with Hwy 13 (Red Coat Trail / Ghost Town Trail) at the hamlet of Scotsguard, with the road continuing south into the hamlet as Range Road 3165 and Railway Avenue. It heads northeast through rural farmland for several kilometres, traversing a switchback travelling to the immediate west of the hamlet of Simmie, where it meets the western end of Hwy 343. The highway now traverses the Swift Current Creek valley to cross a bridge over the river at the western end of Reid Lake, entering the Rural Municipality of Webb No. 138 as it curves past the hamlet of Ferguson Bay. Hwy 631 meanders northwest for several kilometres, travelling through rural farmland to make a sharp left onto Township Road 133 to enter both the Rural Municipality of Gull Lake No. 139 and the town of Gull Lake. Gaining asphalt as it enters town along 6th Street, the highway travels west through mix of neighbourhoods and a business district on the north side of town before coming to an end at an intersection with Hwy 37 (Rutland Avenue) on the northern edge of downtown. With the exclusion of the paved section in Gull Lake, the entire length of Hwy 631 is a gravel two-lane road.

=== Major intersections ===
From south to north:

Rural municipality	Location	km	mi	Destinations	Notes
Bone Creek No. 108	Scotsguard	0.0	0.0	Highway 13 (Red Coat Trail / Ghost Town Trail) – Admiral, Instow Range Road 3165 to Railway Avenue / Highway 722 – Scotsguard	Southern terminus; road continues south as Range Road 3165
Bone Creek No. 108		26.0	16.2	Highway 343 east – Simmie	Western terminus of Hwy 343
Bone Creek No. 108 / Webb No. 138 boundary		27.9	17.3	Bridge over Swift Current Creek	
Webb No. 138	Ferguson Bay	29.4– 29.9	18.3– 18.6	Township Road 121 – Ferguson Bay	
Webb No. 138		43.3	26.9	Ears Grid (Township Road 124) to Highway 37	
Webb No. 138		51.4	31.9	Clairbank Road (Range Road 3173) to Highway 1 (TCH) – Webb	Hwy 631 makes a sharp left onto Township Road 133
Gull Lake No. 139	Gull Lake	67.0	41.6	Southern end of paved section	
Gull Lake No. 139	Gull Lake	68.0	42.3	Highway 37 (Rutland Avenue) to Highway 1 (TCH) – Shaunavon, Downtown, Roseray, Cabri	Northern terminus; road continues as 6th Street
1.000 mi = 1.609 km; 1.000 km = 0.621 mi

== SK 632 ==
Highway 632
- Location: Webb No. 138, Riverside No. 168
- Length: 54.2 km (33.7 mi)

Highway 632 runs from Highway 1 (the Trans-Canada Highway) near Webb north to Highway 738. It intersects with Highways 728, 332, and 32. The village of Pennant – at the junction of 32 and 632 – is the only community along the highway's route. It is about 54 kilometres (34 mi) long.

Hwy 632 begins in the Rural Municipality of Webb No. 138 at an intersection with the Trans-Canada Highway (Hwy 1) on the northern outskirts of the village of Webb, winding its way through hilly prairie lands for a few kilometres to share a short concurrency with westbound Hwy 728 as it enters the Rural Municipality of Riverside No. 168. It now crosses Hwy 332 roughly halfway between Hazlet and Cantuar as it heads north through rural farmland for a few kilometres to make a sharp right turn onto Fosterton Road (Township Road 172), only to later make a sharp left onto Range Road 3171 and enter the village of Pennant. Becoming paved as it passes through neighbourhoods along the eastern end of town, the highway bypasses downtown and crosses over the Great Sandhills Railway to have an intersection with Hwy 32. Leaving Pennant behind and reverting to gravel, the heads north through rural farmland for a few kilometres before coming to and end at an intersection with Hwy 738, roughly 6.5 kilometres (4.0 mi) south of the South Saskatchewan River. Access to Cabri Regional Park is via westbound Hwy 738, north on Range Road 3174, and then east along Township Road 200. With the exclusion of the paved section in Pennant, the entire length of Hwy 632 is a gravel two-lane road.

=== Major intersections ===
From south to north:

Rural municipality	Location	km	mi	Destinations	Notes
Webb No. 138		0.0	0.0	Highway 1 (TCH) – Swift Current, Medicine Hat Allowance Road W (Range Road 3171) – Webb	Southern terminus; road continues south as Allowance Road W (Range Road 3171)
Webb No. 138 / Riverside No. 168 boundary		13.5	8.4	Highway 728 east – Swift Current	Southern end of Hwy 728 concurrency
Webb No. 138 / Riverside No. 168 boundary		18.4	11.4	Highway 728 west – Verlo, Antelope Lake Regional Park	Northern end of Hwy 728 concurrency
Riverside No. 168		25.6	15.9	Highway 332 – Hazlet, Cantuar	
Riverside No. 168		31.4	19.5	Range Road 3173 / Fosterton Road (Township Road 172)	Hwy 632 makes a right onto Fosterton Road
Riverside No. 168		34.6	21.5	Fosterton Road (Township Road 172) / Range Road 3171	Hwy 632 makes a left onto Range Road 3171
Riverside No. 168	Pennant	45.8	28.5	Southern end of paved section	
Riverside No. 168	Pennant	46.5	28.9	Highway 32 – Battrum, Success	Northern end of paved section
Riverside No. 168		54.2	33.7	Highway 738 – Cabri, Cabri Regional Park, Stewart Valley	Northern terminus
1.000 mi = 1.609 km; 1.000 km = 0.621 mi: Concurrency terminus

== SK 633 ==
Highway 633
- Location: Arlington No. 79, Carmichael No. 109, Gull Lake No. 139, Pittville No. 169, Miry Creek No. 229
- Length: 148.4 km (92.2 mi)

Highway 633 runs from Highway 13 near South Fork north past Highway 1 to the village of Shackleton at Highway 32. Highway 633 is about 148 kilometres (92 mi) long.

Along the route, near Highway 13, is Pine Cree Regional Park. Also along the highway, about 6 kilometres (3.7 mi) west of Hazlet, is the historical Standing Rock.

Hwy 633 begins in the Rural Municipality of Arlington No. 79 roughly halfway between Eastend and Dollard at an intersection with Hwy 13 (Red Coat Trail / Ghost Town Trail), with the road continuing south as Range Road 3210. It heads north along asphalt through the hamlet of South Fork, where it crosses a bridge over Swift Current Creek, before winding its way northwest through hilly terrain to pass by Pine Cree Regional Park, where the pavement transitions to gravel, and the Cole Ranch Monument to have an intersection with Hwy 724 and enter the Rural Municipality of Carmichael No. 109.

The highway goes through a switchback as it passes through the locality of Stone and crosses a bridge over Bone Creek as it heads north to have an intersection with Garden Head Road (Township Road 104) just west of Garden Head before winding its way across some more hilly terrain. Hwy 633 now enters mostly flat farmland, gaining asphalt at an intersection with Township Road 122 as it heads north to cross into the Rural Municipality of Gull Lake No. 139 at the intersection with 139 Boundary Road (Township Road 130) shortly before entering the village of Tompkins. It travels along the western side of town, passing by a golf course and neighbourhoods before crossing Canadian Pacific Railway's Maple Creek subdivision and having an intersection with the Trans-Canada Highway (Hwy 1). Leaving Tompkins along gravel, Hwy 633 winds its way across the eastern edge of the Great Sand Hills for several kilometres to enter the Rural Municipality of Pittville No. 169 at an intersection with Hwy 728 at the locality of Nadeauville.

The highway traverses some more of the Great Sand Hills before making an abrupt right onto Township Road 170, leaving the hills for farmland as it heads due east past the Standing Rock to enter the village of Hazlet, gaining asphalt as it travels through downtown, where it makes a left onto Railway Avenue at an intersection with Hwy 332. Leaving Hazlet behind and returning to gravel, Hwy 633 heads due north through rural farmland to have an intersection with Township Road 171, which provides access to Hazlet Regional Park, before going through a switchback via a left onto Township Road 184 and curving right onto Range Road 3200. Now entering the Rural Municipality of Miry Creek No. 229, the highway gains the street name Shackleton Road and crosses Hwy 738 at Waldensian Valley (directly beside of the historic Waldensian Valley Schoolhouse) before travelling through the western side of Shackleton, where it is known as Government Road and crosses the Great Sandhills Railway to come to an end at an intersection with Hwy 32. The entire length of Hwy 633 is a two-lane highway.

=== Major intersections ===
From south to north:

Rural municipality	Location	km	mi	Destinations	Notes
Arlington No. 79		0.0	0.0	Highway 13 (Red Coat Trail / Ghost Town Trail) – Dollard, Eastend	Southern terminus; road continues south as Range Road 3210; southern end of paved section
Arlington No. 79	South Fork	4.2	2.6	Railway Avenue – South Fork	
Arlington No. 79	South Fork	4.8	3.0	Bridge over Swift Current Creek	
Arlington No. 79		7.7	4.8	Pine Cree Regional Park	Access road into park; northern end of paved section
Arlington No. 79		13.5	8.4	Cole Ranch Monument	Access road to monument
Arlington No. 79		20.6	12.8	Highway 724 – Piapot, Instow	
Carmichael No. 109	Stone	31.3	19.4	Bridge over Bone Creek	
Carmichael No. 109		34.8	21.6	Garden Head Road (Township Road 104) – Garden Head	Provides access to the historic Bone Creek Schoolhouse and Bone Creek Manor
Carmichael No. 109		52.2	32.4	Township Road 122	Southern end of paved section
Carmichael No. 109 / Gull Lake No. 139 boundary		58.7	36.5	139 Boundary Road (Township Road 130) – Carmichael	
Gull Lake No. 139	Tompkins	60.4	37.5	C.P.R. Avenue – Tompkins	
Gull Lake No. 139	Tompkins	70.0	43.5	Highway 1 (TCH) – Medicine Hat, Swift Current	Northern end of paved section
Gull Lake No. 139 / Pittville No. 169 boundary	Nadeauville	88.6	55.1	Highway 728 (Township Road 160) to Highway 21 – Golden Prairie, Verlo, Swift Current	
Pittville No. 169		98.6	61.3	Range Road 3213 / Township Road 170	Hwy 633 makes a right onto Township Road 170
Pittville No. 169		107.8	67.0	Standing Rock Historic Site	Access road into historic site
Pittville No. 169	Hazlet	114.1	70.9	3rd Avenue	Southern end of paved section
Pittville No. 169	Hazlet	114.3	71.0	Highway 332 east – Cantuar	Western terminus of Hwy 332; Hwy 633 makes a right onto Railway Avenue
Pittville No. 169	Hazlet	114.8	71.3	2nd Street	Northern end of paved section
Pittville No. 169		115.9	72.0	Township Road 171 – Hazlet Regional Park	
Pittville No. 169		130.5	81.1	Range Road 3195 / Township Road 184	Hwy 633 makes a left onto Township Road 184
Pittville No. 169		131.9– 132.2	82.0– 82.1	Township Road 184 / Range Road 3200	Hwy 633 curves right onto Range Road 3200
Miry Creek No. 229	Waldensian Valley	138.5	86.1	Highway 738 (Transcanada Road) – Abbey, Cabri	Located at the historic Waldensian Valley Schoolhouse
Miry Creek No. 229	Shackleton	147.3	91.5	Franklin Street – Shackleton	
Miry Creek No. 229	Shackleton	148.2	92.1	Railway Avenue – Shackleton	
Miry Creek No. 229	Shackleton	148.4	92.2	Highway 32 – Abbey, Cabri	Northern terminus; road continues north as Range Road 3195
1.000 mi = 1.609 km; 1.000 km = 0.621 mi

== SK 634 ==
Highway 634
- Location: Miry Creek No. 229 – Snipe Lake No. 259
- Length: 32.1 km (19.9 mi)

Highway 634 runs from Hwy 32 in Lancer north to Hwy 30 near Eston Riverside Regional Park. The highway does traverse some switchbacks as it approaches and leaves the South Saskatchewan River, while crossing the river via the Lancer Ferry. It is entirely a two-lane gravel road. Hwy 634 is approximately 32 kilometres (20 mi) long.

=== Major intersections ===
From south to north:

Rural municipality	Location	km	mi	Destinations	Notes
Miry Creek No. 229	Lancer	0.0	0.0	Highway 32 – Abbey, Portreeve, Sceptre	Southern terminus; road continues south as Range Road 3215
Miry Creek No. 229	Lancer	0.2	0.12	Hussar Avenue – Lancer	
Miry Creek No. 229		15.2	9.4	Township Road 230 – Lemsford Ferry	Provides access to ferry
Miry Creek No. 229 / Snipe Lake No. 259 boundary		22.7– 22.9	14.1– 14.2	Lancer Ferry across the South Saskatchewan River	
Snipe Lake No. 259		32.1	19.9	Highway 30 – Eston, Eston Riverside Regional Park	Northern terminus
1.000 mi = 1.609 km; 1.000 km = 0.621 mi

== SK 635 ==
Highway 635
- Location: Maple Creek No. 111, Enterprise No. 142, Deer Forks No. 232, Chesterfield No. 261
- Length: 181.5 km (112.8 mi)

Highway 635 runs from Highway 1 near the Alberta border north to Highway 44 at Laporte. The highway provides access to McLaren Lake Regional Park and crosses the South Saskatchewan River via the Estuary Ferry. It is about 181 kilometres (112 mi) long.

Hwy 635 begins in the Rural Municipality of Maple Creek No. 111 at an intersection with the Trans-Canada Highway (Hwy 1) roughly 13 kilometres (8.1 mi) east of the Alberta border and 25 kilometres (16 mi) northwest of the town of Maple Creek, with the road continuing south as Red Lake Road (Range Road 3290). It winds its way north across hilly prairie lands to passing through the hamlet of Hatton, where it crosses Canadian Pacific Railway's Hatton and Maple Creek subdivisions, and crosses a narrow causeway across Bitter Lake, where it crosses the Hatton subdivision again before entering the Rural Municipality of Enterprise No. 142. Entering flat farmland as it crosses the railway for a third time, it joins a concurrency (overlap) with westbound Hwy 728 for several kilometres just west of the village of Golden Prairie, with Hwy 635 then splitting and passing by McLaren Lake Regional Park. Upon entering the hamlet of Horsham, the highway crosses a former railway line and joins a concurrency with eastbound Hwy 371 as it passes through the eastern side of the community, with the heading north, then curving eastward through rural areas for several kilometres to enter the western edge of the village of Richmound, where Hwy 635 splits off and heads north along Range Road 3282 through rural areas for several kilometres into the Rural Municipality of Deer Forks No. 232.

Hwy 635 traverses several switchbacks to cross Hwy 321 a few kilometres east of Burstall and pass by the locality of Gascoigne, where it crosses the Burstall subdivision of the Great Sandhills Railway, and to the west of Mendham, with access via Township Road 212. The highway now makes a sharp left onto Township Road 222 before making a right onto Range Road 3283, joining a concurrency with westbound Hwy 741 as the pair travel through the eastern side of the hamlet of Estuary before crossing the South Saskatchewan River via the Estuary Ferry, entering the Rural Municipality of Chesterfield No. 261. After winding its way up out of the river valley, the highway arrives at an intersection with Township Road 234, with Hwy 741 turning left while Hwy 635 turns right, winding its way northeast through farmland for several kilometres to make a sharp left onto Range Road 3261, heading due northward for several kilometres to the hamlet of Laporte, where it comes to an end at an intersection with Hwy 44. The road continues north as Range Road 3261. With the exclusion of the concurrency with Hwy 371, which is paved, the entire length of Hwy 635 is a gravel two-lane road.

=== Major intersections ===
From south to north:

Rural municipality	Location	km	mi	Destinations	Notes
Maple Creek No. 111		0.0	0.0	Highway 1 (TCH) – Swift Current, Medicine Hat	Southern terminus; road continues south as Red Lake Road (Range Road 3290)
Maple Creek No. 111		17.1– 17.3	10.6– 10.7	Causeway / bridge over Bitter Lake	
Enterprise No. 142		30.7	19.1	Highway 728 east (Township Road 150) – Golden Prairie	Southern end of Hwy 728 concurrency
Enterprise No. 142		40.7	25.3	Highway 728 west (Township Road 152) To Highway 528 west / Highway 41 (Buffalo Trail)	Northern end of Hwy 728 concurrency
Enterprise No. 142	McLaren Lake Regional Park	45.5	28.3	McLaren Lake Regional Park main entrance	Access road into park
Enterprise No. 142	Horsham	60.1	37.3	Highway 371 west To Highway 537 west / Highway 41 (Buffalo Trail)	Southern end of both paved section and Hwy 371 concurrency
Enterprise No. 142	Richmound	71.4	44.4	Highway 371 east – Richmound, Fox Valley	Northern end of both paved section and Hwy 371 concurrency
Deer Forks No. 232		95.4	59.3	Highway 321 – Burstall, Liebenthal	
Deer Forks No. 232		109.7	68.2	Township Road 212 – Mendham	
Deer Forks No. 232		119.4	74.2	Range Road 3282 / Township Road 222	Hwy 635 makes a left onto Township Road 222
Deer Forks No. 232		122.7	76.2	Township Road 222 / Range Road 3283	Hwy 635 makes a right onto Range Road 3283
Deer Forks No. 232		125.9	78.2	Highway 741 east (Township Road 224) – Leader	Southern end of Hwy 741 concurrency
Deer Forks No. 232	Estuary	130.6	81.2	Railway Avenue – Estuary	
Deer Forks No. 232 / Chesterfield No. 261 boundary		131.9– 132.0	82.0– 82.0	Estuary Ferry across South Saskatchewan River	
Chesterfield No. 261		136.2	84.6	Highway 741 west (Township Road 234) To Highway 562 west – Empress	Northern end of Hwy 741 concurrency; Hwy 635 makes a right onto Township Road 234
Chesterfield No. 261		162.1	100.7	Township Road 242 / Range Road 3261	Hwy 635 makes a left onto Range Road 3261
Chesterfield No. 261	Laporte	181.5	112.8	Highway 44 – Mantario, Eatonia Range Road 3261 – Laporte	Northern terminus; road continues north as Range Road 3261
1.000 mi = 1.609 km; 1.000 km = 0.621 mi: Concurrency terminus

== SK 636 ==
Highway 636
- Location: Spy Hill No. 152, Langenburg No. 181, Churchbridge No. 211
- Length: 23.8 km (14.8 mi)

Highway 636 runs from Highway 22 near Gerald north to the Yellowhead Highway (Highway 16) between Churchbridge and Langenburg. Between Hwy 22 and Main Street in Gerald, the highway is paved, with the rest of its length to the Yellowhead being gravel. Hwy 636 includes a crossing of the Canadian Pacific Railway's Bredenbury subdivision. It is about 24 kilometres (15 mi) long.

=== Major intersections ===
From south to north:

Rural municipality	Location	km	mi	Destinations	Notes
Spy Hill No. 152		0.0	0.0	Highway 22 – Esterhazy, Binscarth	Southern terminus; southern end of paved section; road continues south as Range Road 1320
Spy Hill No. 152	Gerald	1.6	0.99	Main Street / Century Road	Northern end of paved section
Langenburg No. 181	No major junctions				
Churchbridge No. 211		23.8	14.8	Highway 16 (TCH/YH) – Churchbridge, Langenburg	Northern terminus; road continues north as Range Road 1320
1.000 mi = 1.609 km; 1.000 km = 0.621 mi

== SK 637 ==
Highway 637
- Location: Fertile Belt No. 183, Saltcoats No. 213, Wallace No. 243, Sliding Hills No. 273, Keys No. 303
- Length: 190.2 km (118.2 mi)

Highway 637 runs from Highway 9 (Saskota Flyway) near Round Lake to Highway 8 / Highway 49 in Norquay. Highway 637 passes either near or through the communities of Esterhazy, Zeneta, Bredenbury, Saltcoats, Tonkin, Dunleath, Rhein, Dneiper, and Veregin. It also provides access to Kaposvar Historic Site, Esterhazy Regional Park, Saltcoats & District Regional Park, and Fort Pelly National Historic Site. Throughout its journey, Hwy 637 shares concurrencies (overlaps) with the Yellowhead Highway (Hwy 16), Hwy 10, and Hwy 5. It is about 190 kilometres (120 mi) long.

Hwy 637 begins in the Rural Municipality of Fertile Belt No. 183 at an intersection with Hwy 9 (Saskota Flyway), just immediately north of its intersection with Hwy 247. It meanders northeast along gravel through the Qu'Appelle River valley along the north bank of the river for several kilometres to an intersection between Range Road 2013 and Township Road 183, with the highway making a left onto Range Road 2013. Climbing up out of the river valley, the highway heads due north through farmland past the Kaposvar Historic Site (access via Township Road 191) to gain asphalt as it enters the town of Esterhazy along Sumner Street. It travels through a business district on the south side of town to have an intersection with Hwy 22 (Park Avenue) before travelling through neighbourhoods along the eastern side of downtown, where it has an intersection with 4th Avenue, which provides access to Esterhazy Regional Park. Leaving Esterhazy behind, Hwy 637 reverts to gravel as it crosses over Kaposvar Creek and passes through rural areas for the next several kilometres, travelling just to the west of Zeneta (connected via a short access road) and crossing the Rivers subdivision of the Canadian National Railway.

Entering the Rural Municipality of Saltcoats No. 213, it immediately goes through a switchback as it crosses over Cutarm Creek, continuing due north for a few kilometres to cross Hwy 15 before joining a concurrency (overlap) with the Yellowhead Highway (westbound Hwy 16) on the southern edge of Bredenbury, with the road continuing north into town as Dominion Street. The pair head northwest along asphalt for a few kilometres to pass by Saltcoats & District Regional Park and along the western side of the town of Saltcoats, where they have an intersection with eastbound Hwy 725. Not long after leaving Saltcoats, they share an intersection with Hwy 629 before Hwy 637 splits off along gravel once again and heads north along Range Road 2025, crossing Canadian Pacific Railway's Bredenbury subdivision and entering the Rural Municipality of Wallace No. 243.

Sharing a concurrency with eastbound Hwy 10 between Tonkin and Dunleath (which is paved), the highway heads north through farmland to cross a few small streams and enter the village of Rhein, travelling just to the west of downtown along Church Street and gaining asphalt for a short distance between a former railway crossing and the intersection between Hwy 726 and the eastern terminus of Hwy 309. Leaving Rhein, Hwy 637 enters the Rural Municipality of Sliding Hills No. 273, travelling through rural areas for several kilometres to pass through the locality of Dneiper along Dneiper Road and crossing Canadian National Railway's Togo subdivision. Now sharing a concurrency with Hwy 5 to the hamlet of Veregin, with Hwy 637 splitting off and heading north to cross a bridge over the Whitesand River into the Rural Municipality of Keys No. 303.

After passing by the former site of the Christian Community of Universal Brotherhood's Leader's Residence, Hwy 637 makes a right onto Township Road 315 at an intersection with Hwy 754, heading east for a couple kilometres before making a left onto Range Road 2011 and crossing a bridge over the Assiniboine River. Continuing north, the highway passes just to the west of Fort Pelly National Historic Site (accessed via Township Road 324A) and traverses several switchbacks to come to an intersection with Hwy 650, where Hwy 637 makes a sharp right, passing through rural areas before coming to an end on the southern edge of Norquay at an intersection with Hwy 8 / Hwy 49. The entire length of Hwy 637 is a two-lane highway, and with the exception of the above-mentioned paved sections, is entirely a gravel road.

=== Major intersections ===
From south to north:

Rural municipality	Location	km	mi	Destinations	Notes
Fertile Belt No. 183		0.0	0.0	Highway 9 west (Saskota Flyway) to Highway 247 – Round Lake, Stockholm	Southern terminus; intersection lies 0.3 kilometres (0.19 mi) north of Hwy 9's intersection with Hwy 247
Fertile Belt No. 183		16.0	9.9	Township Road 183 – Hazel Cliffe, Tantallon Range Road 2013 – Burrows	Hwy 637 makes a left onto Range Road 2013
Fertile Belt No. 183		21.9	13.6	Township Road 191 – Kaposvar Historic Site	
Fertile Belt No. 183		25.1	15.6	Southern end of paved section at Township Road 193	
Fertile Belt No. 183	Esterhazy	27.2	16.9	Highway 22 north (Park Avenue) to Highway 80 – Stockholm, Gerald, Churchbridge	
Fertile Belt No. 183	Esterhazy	27.8	17.3	4th Avenue – Esterhazy Regional Park	
Fertile Belt No. 183	Esterhazy	28.4	17.6	Northern end of paved section at Township Road 195	
Fertile Belt No. 183		29.5	18.3	Bridge over Kaposvar Creek	
Fertile Belt No. 183		36.2	22.5	Zeneta access road	
Saltcoats No. 213		52.4	32.6	Bridge over Cutarm Creek	
Saltcoats No. 213		57.7	35.9	Highway 15 – Melville, Churchbridge	
Saltcoats No. 213	Bredenbury	60.2	37.4	Highway 16 (TCH/YH) east – Churchbridge Dominion Street – Bredenbury	Southern end of both paved section and Hwy 16 concurrency
Saltcoats No. 213	Bredenbury	61.2	38.0	Highway 723 east (Broadway Avenue) – Bredenbury	Western terminus of Hwy 723
Saltcoats No. 213	Saltcoats	73.8	45.9	Crescent Lake Road – Saltcoats, Saltcoats & District Regional Park	
Saltcoats No. 213	Saltcoats	74.4	46.2	Hill Street – Saltcoats	
Saltcoats No. 213	Saltcoats	75.5	46.9	Highway 725 east – Saltcoats, Esstshore Estates	
Saltcoats No. 213		80.8	50.2	Highway 629 south (Atwater Road) – Atwater	Northern terminus of Hwy 629
Saltcoats No. 213		83.2	51.7	Highway 16 (TCH/YH) west – Romeby, Yorkton	Northern end of both paved section and Hwy 16 concurrency
Wallace No. 243	Tonkin	96.4	59.9	Highway 10 west – Yorkton	Southern end of both paved section and Hwy 10 concurrency
Wallace No. 243		101.3	62.9	Highway 10 east – Wroxton	Northern end of both paved section and Hwy 10 concurrency
Wallace No. 243	Rhein	117.3	72.9	Southern end of paved section at former railway crossing	
Wallace No. 243	Rhein	117.7	73.1	Highway 309 west / Highway 726 to Highway 9 (Saskota Flyway) – Ebenezer	Eastern terminus of Hwy 309; northern end of paved section
Sliding Hills No. 273		144.5	89.8	Highway 5 west – Mikado	Southern end of both paved section and Hwy 5 concurrency
Sliding Hills No. 273	Veregin	152.9	95.0	Highway 5 east – Kamsack Road Allowance – Veregin	Northern end of both paved section and Hwy 5 concurrency
Sliding Hills No. 273 / Keys No. 303 boundary		160.0	99.4	Bridge over the Whitesand River	
Keys No. 303	notes	165.1	102.6	Highway 754 west – Canora	Eastern terminus of Hwy 754; Hwy 637 makes a right onto Township Road 315
Keys No. 303		166.8	103.6	Township Road 315 / Range Road 2011	Hwy 637 makes a left onto Range Road 2011
Keys No. 303		167.8	104.3	Bridge over the Assiniboine River	
Keys No. 303		175.7	109.2	Township Road 324A	
Keys No. 303		181.8	113.0	Highway 650 south – Mikado	Northern terminus of Hwy 650; Hwy 637 makes a right
Keys No. 303	Norquay	190.2	118.2	Highway 8 / Highway 49 – Norquay, Pelly	Northern terminus
1.000 mi = 1.609 km; 1.000 km = 0.621 mi: Concurrency terminus

== SK 638 ==
Highway 638
- Range Road 2044, Township Road 191, Range Road 2042
- Location: Rural Municipality of Grayson No. 184
- Length: 19.4 km (12.1 mi)

Highway 638 is a 19.4-kilometre-long (12.1 mi) mostly gravel highway in the Rural Municipality of Grayson No. 184. Serving essentially as a northerly extension of Hwy 201, it runs from the intersection of Hwy 247 in the Qu'Appelle River valley near West End to the junction with Hwy 9 / Hwy 22 (Saskota Flyway) in Dubuc.

=== Major intersections ===
From south to north:

Rural municipality	Location	km	mi	Destinations	Notes
Grayson No. 184		0.0	0.0	Highway 201 south to Highway 1 (TCH) – Broadview; Highway 247 – Round Lake, West End, Sunset Beach, Crooked Lake Provincial Park	Southern terminus; northern terminus of Hwy 201; southern end of unpaved section
Grayson No. 184	Dubuc	18.5	11.5	Township Road 200	Northern end of unpaved section
Grayson No. 184	Dubuc	19.4	12.1	Highway 9 / Highway 22 (Saskota Flyway) – Grayson, Yorkton, Stockholm	Northern terminus
1.000 mi = 1.609 km; 1.000 km = 0.621 mi

== SK 639 ==
Highway 639
- Location: Lipton No. 217, Kellross No. 247, Emerald No. 277, Elfros No. 307
- Length: 110.0 km (68.4 mi)

Highway 639 runs from Hwy 727 just north of Pasqua Lake to the Yellowhead Highway (Hwy 16) just to the south of both Mozart and the Quill Lakes. It is approximately 110 kilometres (68 mi) long.

Hwy 639 begins in the Rural Municipality of Lipton No. 217 at an intersection with Hwy 727 just to the north of Pasqua Lake, heading north along gravel to curve eastward and make an immediate left to join a concurrency (overlap) with paved westbound Hwy 22. The pair travel along the western side of Dysart before Hwy 639 splits off and heads north along gravel to cross Jumping Deer Creek and enter the Rural Municipality of Kellross No. 247, sharing a short concurrency with westbound Hwy 731 and pass through several sections of the Muskowekwan First Nation, which lie just to the east of the Touchwood Hills, to reach Lestock. Traveling along the west side of town, it crosses both Canadian National Railway's Watrous subdivision and Hwy 15 (Arpad Avenue) before leaving Lestock and meandering around a small lake as it passes through several more sections of the First Nation to enter the Rural Municipality of Emerald No. 277.

The highway travels due northward through rural farmland for several kilometres, passing by the locality of Wynot and through the hamlet of Wishart, where it crosses Hwy 743. Entering the Rural Municipality of Elfros No. 307, Hwy 639 comes to an end at an intersection with the Yellowhead Highway (Hwy 16) just to the south of Mozart, with the road continuing north toward both Mozart and the Quill Lakes as Range Road 2150. With the exclusion of the aforementioned concurrency with Hwy 22 is Dysart, which is paved, the entire length of Hwy 639 is a gravel two-lane road.

=== Major intersections ===
From south to north:

Rural municipality	Location	km	mi	Destinations	Notes
Lipton No. 217		0.0	0.0	Highway 727 (Township Road 214) – Edenwold, Pasqua Lake, Fort Qu'Appelle	Southern terminus
Lipton No. 217		14.1	8.8	Highway 22 east – Lipton	Southern end of both paved section and Hwy 22 concurrency
Lipton No. 217	Dysart	15.9	9.9	Railway Avenue – Dysart	
Lipton No. 217	Dysart	16.2	10.1	Highway 22 west – Cupar Qu'Appelle Avenue (Dysart)	Northern end of both paved section and Hwy 22 concurrency
Lipton No. 217		27.5	17.1	Bridge over Jumping Deer Creek	
Kellross No. 247		39.3	24.4	Highway 731 east (Township Road 254) – Ituna	Southern end of Hwy 731 concurrency
Kellross No. 247		42.5	26.4	Highway 731 west (Township Road 260)	Northern end of Hwy 731 concurrency; Hwy 639 turns right
Kellross No. 247	Lestock	59.2	36.8	Highway 15 (Arpad Avenue) – Punnichy, Touchwood Hills Post Provincial Park, Lestock, Leross	
Kellross No. 247	Lestock	59.3	36.8	Touchwood Hills Avenue – Lestock	
Emerald No. 277	Wishart	85.6	53.2	Railway Avenue – Wishart	
Emerald No. 277	Wishart	86.0	53.4	Highway 743 – Bankend, West Bend	
Elfros No. 307		110.0	68.4	Highway 16 (TCH/YH) – Wynyard, Elfros Range Road 2150 – Mozart	Northern terminus; road continues north as Range Road 2150
1.000 mi = 1.609 km; 1.000 km = 0.621 mi: Concurrency terminus

== SK 640 ==
Highway 640
- Location: Edenwold No. 158, Cupar No. 218, North Qu'Appelle No. 187, Touchwood No. 248, Mount Hope No. 279, Big Quill No. 308, Lakeside No. 338, Spalding No. 368, Ponass Lake No. 367, Pleasantdale No. 398, Barrier Valley No. 397
- Length: 231.0 km (143.5 mi)

Highway 640 runs from south to north beginning at Highway 364 near Edenwold and ending at Highway 349 just north of Saint-Front. Highway 640 intersects with Highway 16 near Wynyard and provides access to Wynyard Regional Park. It is about 231 kilometres (144 mi) long.

Hwy 640 begins in the Edenwold No. 158 at an intersection between Hwy 364 and Township Road 194 just immediately west of Edenwold, with Hwy 640 heading north along gravel through rural farmland to cross Canadian National Railway's Qu'Appelle subdivision and having an intersection with Hwy 729 before passing through Muscowpetung Saulteaux Nation reserve as it winds its way through the Qu'Appelle River valley, where it has an intersection with Hwy 624 and crosses a bridge over the river to enter the Rural Municipality of Cupar No. 218.

Winding its way back out of the river valley, Hwy 640 makes an abrupt left hand turn at an intersection with Hwy 727, heading due north along the boundary with the Rural Municipality of North Qu'Appelle No. 187 for a short distance before fully reentering the RM and heading due north for a few kilometres to enter the town of Cupar, becoming paved as it crosses over Canadian Pacific Railway's Bulyea subdivision and travels through neighbourhoods along the western side of town along Donald Road for several blocks before joining a short concurrency (overlap) with eastbound Hwy 22 on the north side of town. Leaving Cupar, Hwy 640 splits off and heads north along gravel once again for several kilometres to enter the Rural Municipality of Touchwood No. 248, passing through farmland and the locality of Zala to share a short concurrency with westbound Hwy 731 just north of Arbury. Hwy 640 then crosses the George Gordon First Nation to enter the Rural Municipality of Mount Hope No. 279.

After traversing the Touchwood Hills, the highway enters the village of Punnichy and curves around the western and northern sides of the village along South Road to make an abrupt sharp left turn to cross Canadian National Railway's Watrous subdivision and join a short concurrency with eastbound Hwy 15. Leaving Punnichy, Hwy 640 splits off and winds its way north past the Kawacatoose and Day Star First Nations to join a concurrency with westbound Hwy 743 as the pair enter the Rural Municipality of Big Quill No. 308. The highway travels just to the west of Kranse, where Hwy 743 splits off, and Hwy 640 continues north past Wynyard Regional Park to travel along the western side of Wynyard, where it crosses both the Yellowhead Highway (Hwy 16) and Canadian Pacific Railway's Wynyard subdivision, as well as having a short paved section. Leaving Wynyard and continuing along gravel, it goes through a switchback before crossing a causeway / bridge across the Quill Lakes into the Rural Municipality of Lakeside No. 338. The highway crosses both Hwy 5 and Canadian National Railway's Margo subdivision as it travels along the eastern edge of the village of Quill Lake before having an intersection with Hwy 758 (Hendon Road). Entering the Rural Municipality of Spalding No. 368, Hwy 640 passes through rural areas west of Scrip to have a concurrency with eastbound Hwy 756 before running along the boundary with the Rural Municipality of Ponass Lake No. 367, where it travels through the hamlet of Saint-Front. Now travelling along the boundary between the Rural Municipalities of Pleasantdale No. 398 and Barrier Valley No. 397 for a few kilometres through rural farmland, the highway comes to an end at an intersection with Hwy 349, with the road continuing north as Range Road 2160. The entire length of Hwy 640, minor some aforementioned paved sections, is a gravel two-lane road.

=== Major intersections ===
From south to north:

Rural municipality	Location	km	mi	Destinations	Notes
Edenwold No. 158		0.0	0.0	Highway 364 (Range Road 2172 / Township Road 194) – Balgonie, Edenwold	Southern terminus
Edenwold No. 158		0.8	0.50	1st Avenue – Edenwold	
Edenwold No. 158		6.5	4.0	Highway 729 west – Craven	Eastern terminus of Hwy 729
Edenwold No. 158	Muscowpetung 80	16.7	10.4	Highway 624 south – Piapot 75, Zehner	Northern terminus of Hwy 624
Edenwold No. 158 / Cupar No. 218 boundary	Muscowpetung 80	17.8	11.1	Bridge over the Qu'Appelle River	
Cupar No. 218 / Rural Municipality of North Qu'Appelle No. 187 boundary		23.2	14.4	Highway 727 east – Pasqua Lake, Fort Qu'Appelle	Western terminus of Hwy 727; Hwy 640 turns left
Cupar No. 218	Cupar	38.8	24.1	Southern end of paved section at railway crossing	
Cupar No. 218	Cupar	39.6	24.6	Highway 22 west – Markinch	Southern end of Hwy 22 concurrency
Cupar No. 218		41.2	25.6	Highway 22 east – Dysart	Northern end of both paved section and Hwy 22
Touchwood No. 248		67.1	41.7	Highway 731 east – Lestock	Southern end of Hwy 731 concurrency
Touchwood No. 248		73.6	45.7	Highway 731 west – Serath	Northern end of Hwy 731 concurrency
Mount Hope No. 279	Punnichy	95.9	59.6	Highway 15 west – Quinton	Southern end of both paved section and Hwy 15 concurrency
Mount Hope No. 279		97.9	60.8	Highway 15 east – Lestock	Northern end of both paved section and Hwy 15 concurrency
Mount Hope No. 279	Day Star 87	117.1	72.8	Township Road 292 – Day Star 87	
Mount Hope No. 279		122.0	75.8	Highway 743 east – Wishart	Southern end of Hwy 743 concurrency
Big Quill No. 308		129.9	80.7	Krasne Road (Township Road 303) – Krasne	
Big Quill No. 308		131.5	81.7	Highway 743 west (Copeland Road)	Northern end of Hwy 743 concurrency
Big Quill No. 308		145.0	90.1	Wynyard Regional Park	Access road into park
Big Quill No. 308	Wynyard	137.5	85.4	Highway 16 (TCH/YH) – Dafoe, Kandahar, Mozart	Southern end of paved section
Big Quill No. 308	Wynyard	148.0	92.0	Avenue B West – Wynyard	
Big Quill No. 308	Wynyard	148.1	92.0	Avenue A West – Wynyard	
Big Quill No. 308	Wynyard	148.2	92.1	Northern end of paved section at railway crossing	
Lakeside No. 338		164.3– 170.4	102.1– 105.9	Causeway / bridge over the Quill Lakes	
Lakeside No. 338	Quill Lake	183.2	113.8	Highway 5 – Watson, Quill Lake, Clair	
Lakeside No. 338	Quill Lake	183.8	114.2	Saskatchewan Avenue – Quill Lake	
Lakeside No. 338		185.4	115.2	Highway 758 (Hendon Road) to Highway 5 – Hendon	
Spalding No. 368		211.3	131.3	Highway 756 west – Spalding	Southern end of Hwy 756 concurrency
Spalding No. 368 / Ponass Lake No. 367 boundary		216.7	134.7	Highway 756 east – Rose Valley	Northern end of Hwy 756 concurrency
Pleasantdale No. 398 / Barrier Valley No. 397 boundary		231.0	143.5	Highway 349 – Naicam, Archerwill	Northern terminus; road continues north as Range Road 2160
1.000 mi = 1.609 km; 1.000 km = 0.621 mi: Concurrency terminus

== SK 641 ==
Highway 641
- Length: 131.2 km (81.5 mi)

Highway 641 runs from Highway 1 (Trans-Canada Highway) / Hwy 623 near Pense north to Highway 15 at Semans. The highway intersects both Hwy 11 (Louis Riel Trail) and Highway 20 at Lumsden, as well as Highway 22 at Earl Grey. It is about 131.2 kilometres (81.5 mi) long.

== SK 642 ==
Highway 642
- Location: Pense No. 160, Dufferin No. 190
- Length: 37.7 km (23.4 mi)

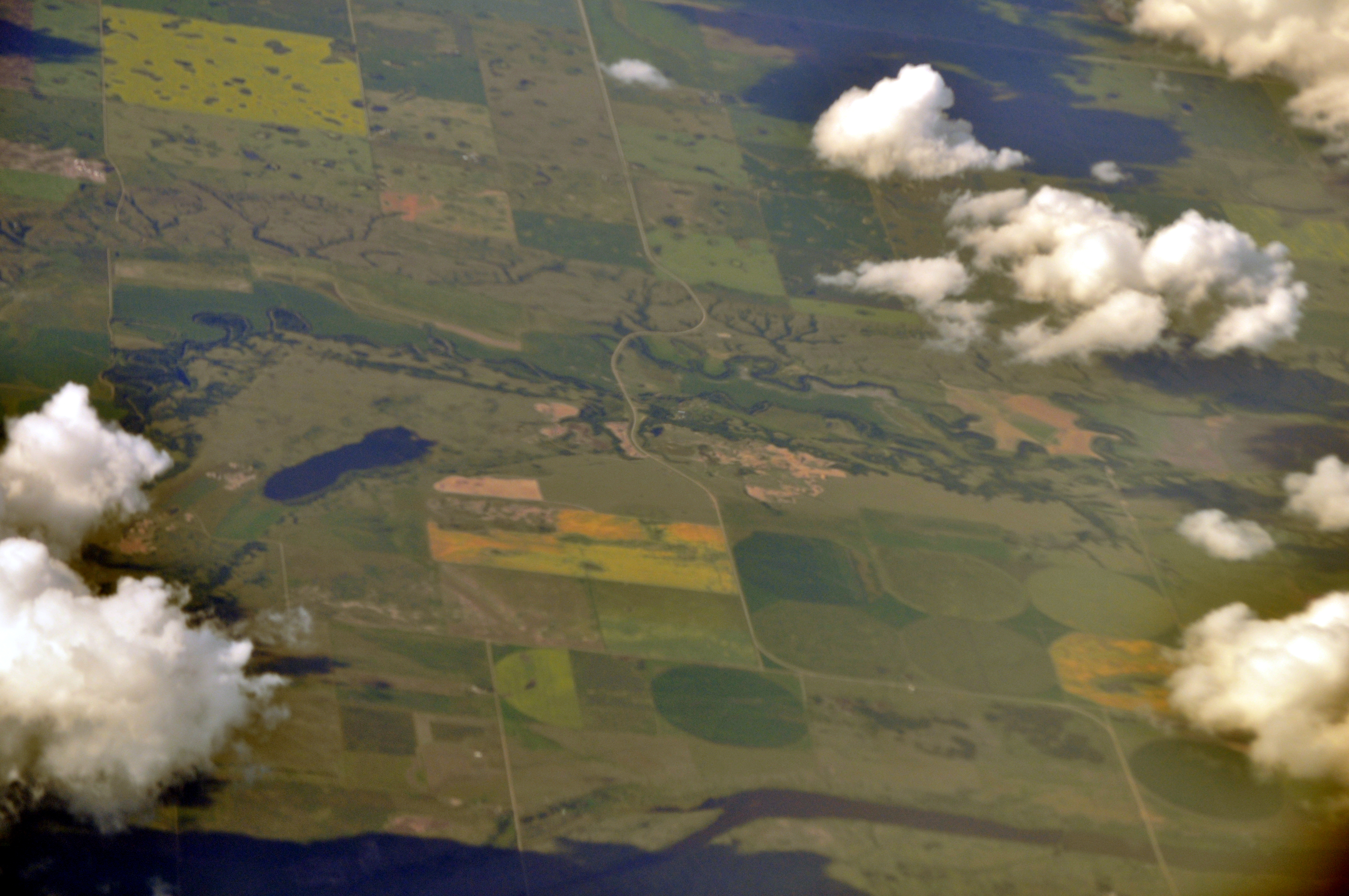
Aerial view of part of Highway 642, taken from roughly south by south-west. The highway runs roughly vertical near the middle of the image, with a jog near the centre as it crosses a stream.

Highway 642 is a runs from Highway 1 near Belle Plaine to the junction between Highway 11 and Highway 354 near Bethune. Highway 642 also passes near Stony Beach. It is about 38 kilometres (24 mi) long.

Hwy 642 begins in the Rural Municipality of Pense No. 160 at an intersection with the Trans-Canada Highway (Hwy 1) in the village of Belle Plaine, with the road continuing south as Range Road 2240. It heads north along the western boundary of the village, where it has an intersection with Railway Avenue, before crossing the Canadian Pacific Railway's Belle Plain subdivision before leaving the village, crossing a spur line to the nearby Mosaic Potash plant twice as it passes through rural areas. After having an intersection with the western end of Hwy 730, the highway travels the western side of the hamlet of Stony Beach, where it crosses Canadian National Railway's Central Butte subdivision, before continuing north through rural farmland for several kilometres to cross Rocky Lake via a causeway and enter the Dufferin No. 190.

Hwy 642 traverses some switchbacks as it crosses the Qu'Appelle River valley, where it crosses a bridge the river itself, before heading due north across farmland for several kilometres to pass just to the east of the village of Bethune, where it has an intersection with Rink Avenue and crosses the Last Mountain Railway, before coming to an end at the intersection between Hwy 11 (Louis Riel Trail) and the southern end of Hwy 354. The entire length of Hwy 642 is a gravel two-lane road.

=== Major intersections ===
From south to north:

Rural municipality	Location	km	mi	Destinations	Notes
Pense No. 160	Belle Plaine	0.0	0.0	Highway 1 (TCH) – Regina, Moose Jaw	Southern terminus; road continues south as Range Road 2240
Pense No. 160	Belle Plaine	0.3	0.19	Railway Avenue – Belle Plaine	
Pense No. 160		7.1	4.4	Highway 730 east – Keystown, Grand Coulee	Western terminus of Hwy 730
Pense No. 160	Stony Beach	8.6	5.3	First Avenue – Stony Beach	
Pense No. 160		18.6– 18.8	11.6– 11.7	Causeway across Rocky Lake	
Dufferin No. 190		25.0	15.5	Bridge over the Qu'Appelle River	
Dufferin No. 190		36.8	22.9	Rink Avenue – Bethune	
Dufferin No. 190		37.7	23.4	Highway 11 (Louis Riel Trail) – Saskatoon, Regina Highway 354 north – Dilke, Last Mountain Lake	Northern terminus; southern terminus of Hwy 354; road continues as northbound Hwy 354
1.000 mi = 1.609 km; 1.000 km = 0.621 mi

== SK 643 ==
Highway 643
- Length: 82 km (51 mi)

Highway 643 runs from Highway 735 just south of Caron to Highway 11 (Louis Riel Trail) at Craik. The highway passes near the communities of Caron, Grayburn, Rowletta, and Keeler. It connects with the Trans-Canada Highway (Highway 1), as well as Highways 42 and 732. It is about 82 kilometres (51 mi) long.

== SK 644 ==
Highway 644
- Length: 62 km (39 mi)

Highway 644 runs from Highway 1 near Morse to Highway 42 near Riverhurst. Highway 644 passes near the communities of Glen Kerr and Log Valley. It is about 62 kilometres (39 mi) long.

== SK 645 ==
Highway 645
- Length: 25 km (16 mi)

Highway 645 runs from Highway 612 near Herbert to Range Road 3103 near Old Main Centre and New Main Centre. It is about 25 kilometres (16 mi) long.

== SK 646 ==
Highway 646
- Length: 46 km (29 mi)

Highway 646 runs from the Demaine Access Road near Demaine to Highway 45 near Birsay. Highway 646 connects with Highways 737 and 42. At the intersection with Highway 42 is the community of Lucky Lake. It is about 46 kilometres (29 mi) long.

== SK 647 ==
Highway 647
- Length: 23 km (14 mi)

Highway 647 runs from Highway 342 near Lacadena to Highway 4 near Sanctuary. It is about 23 kilometres (14 mi) long.

== SK 648 ==
Highway 648
- Length: 20.3 km (12.6 mi)

Highway 648 runs from Arran at Highways 49 and Highway 660 north to Whitebeech at Highway 753. It is about 20.3 kilometres (12.6 mi) long.

== SK 649 ==
Highway 649
- Length: 47 km (29 mi)

Highway 649 runs from Highway 32 near Lemsford to the Highway 21 / Highway 44 junction near Glidden. It crosses the South Saskatchewan River via the Lemsford Ferry. The highway is about 47 kilometres (29 mi) long.

== SK 650 ==
Highway 650
- Length: 87 km (54 mi)

Highway 650 runs from Highway 753 near Danbury to Highway 9 near Gorlitz. The highway passes near the communities of Hyas, Mikado, Donwell, and Hamton and shares a brief concurrences with Highway 49 near Hyas and with Highway 5 near Mikado. It is about 87 kilometres (54 mi) long.

== SK 651 ==
Highway 651
- Length: 20 km (12 mi)

Highway 651 runs from Highway 16 at Theodore north to Highway 746 north of Goldenvale. Highway 651 is about 20 kilometres (12 mi) long.

== SK 652 ==
Highway 652
- Algrove Road
- Location: Rural Municipality of Barrier Valley No. 397
- Length: 24.5 km (15.2 mi)

Highway 652 is a 24.5-kilometre-long (15.2 mi) two-lane gravel road within the Rural Municipality of Barrier Valley No. 397, running across the Barrier River Valley while connecting the town of Archerwill with the hamlet of Algrove, the western shore of Barrier Lake, Barrier Lake Resort, and Hwy 773. It does includes a bridge across the Barrier River at the western tip of Barrier Lake.

From south to north:

Rural municipality	Location	km	mi	Destinations	Notes
Barrier Valley No. 397	Archerwill	0.0	0.0	Highway 349 to Highway 35 – Nobleville	Southern terminus; road continues south as Algrove Road
Barrier Valley No. 397	Archerwill	0.8	0.50	Old Highway 35 to Highway 35	
Barrier Valley No. 397		6.5	4.0	Township Road 410 – Algrove	
Barrier Valley No. 397		12.4	7.7	Lakeshore Drive – Barrier Lake Resort	
Barrier Valley No. 397		14.0	8.7	Bridge over the Barrier River	
Barrier Valley No. 397		24.5	15.2	Highway 773 – McKague, Chelan	Northern terminus; road continues north as Range Road 2134
1.000 mi = 1.609 km; 1.000 km = 0.621 mi

== SK 653 ==
Highway 653
- Length: 56.4 km (35.0 mi)

Highway 653 runs from Highway 732 west of Craik north to Highway 15 near Farrerdale. Highway 747 meets Highway 653 passes through Davidson and is about 56 kilometres (35 mi) long.

== SK 654 ==
Highway 654
- Length: 17 km (11 mi)
- Existed: ?–2005

Highway 654 is a former highway. It ran from the Conquest Access Road near Conquest to Highway 45. As of 2005, Range Road 3094 and Township Road 310, the two municipal roads making up Highway 654, are no longer designated as Highway 654. The highway was 17 kilometres (11 mi) long.

== SK 655 ==
Highway 655
- Length: 102 km (63 mi)

Highway 655 runs from Highway 15 near Milden to Highway 376. The highway passes near the communities of Feudal, Catherwood, Leney, and Perdue. It connects with Highways 7, 768, and 14 and is 102 kilometres (63 mi) long.

== SK 656 ==
Highway 656
- Length: 176 km (109 mi)

Highway 656 runs from Highway 7 at Fiske north to Highway 4 at Battleford near the mouth of the Battle River. The highway passes through the communities of Herschel, Springwater, Landis, and Cando. Attractions along the highway include the Ancient Echoes Interpretive Centre at Herschel and Eagle Creek Valley. The highway is 176 kilometres (109 mi) long.

=== Major intersections ===
Rural municipality	Location	km	mi	Destinations	Notes
Pleasant Valley No. 288	Fiske	0.0	0.0	Highway 7 – Rosetown, Kindersley	Southern terminus
Mountain View No. 318	Herschel	18.1	11.2		
Mountain View No. 318		20.5	12.7	Highway 31 east – Rosetown	
Mountain View No. 318	Gap in route				
Mountain View No. 318		26.3	16.3	Highway 31 – Kerrobert	
Biggar No. 347	Springwater	58.3	36.2	Highway 51 – Kerrobert	
Biggar No. 347	Gap in route				
Biggar No. 347		68.8	42.8	Highway 51 – Biggar	
Grandview No. 349		76.0	47.2	Handel Access Road	
Reford No. 379	Landis	90.7	56.4	Highway 14 – Wilkie	
Reford No. 379	Gap in route				
Reford No. 379		92.3	57.4	Highway 14 – Biggar	
Rosemount No. 378	Cando	127.6	79.3	Highway 4 – Biggar	To Highway 784 east
Gap in route
Buffalo No. 409– Battle River No. 438 boundary	Red Pheasant 108	135.4	84.1	Highway 4 – The Battlefords	East end of Highway 784 concurrency
Buffalo No. 409– Battle River No. 438 boundary	Mosquito 109	146.4	91.0	Highway 784 west – Wilkie	West end of Highway 784 concurrency
Battle River No. 438	Battleford	176.2	109.5	Highway 4 – Biggar, North Battleford	Northern terminus
1.000 mi = 1.609 km; 1.000 km = 0.621 mi: Concurrency terminus

== SK 657 ==
Highway 657
- Length: 103.5 km (64.3 mi)

Highway 657 runs from Highway 14 south to Highway 7 about 3.2 kilometres (2.0 mi) north of Brock. The highway intersects Highways 51, 31, and 771. Its southern terminus continues south as Highway 30. It is about 103.5 kilometres (64.3 mi) long. Until the 1940s, this highway was the southern section of Highway 29.

== SK 658 ==
Highway 658
- Length: 105 km (65 mi)

Highway 658 runs from Highway 44 at Snipe Lake north to Highway 51 north of Dodsland. The highway passes near the communities of Netherhill and Beadle; and shares a short concurrency with Highway 7. The highway is 105 kilometres (65 mi) long.

== SK 659 ==
Highway 659
- Length: 72 km (45 mi)

Highway 659 runs from Highway 51 north to Highway 784 east of Wilkie. The highway has a concurrency with Highways 374 and 14. It provides access to Broadacres, Tramping Lake, and Scott. It is about 72 kilometres (45 mi) long.

== SK 660 ==
Highway 660
- Length: 25 km (16 mi)

Highway 660 runs from Highway 8 near St. Philips to Highway 49 near Arran. It is about 25 kilometres (16 mi) long.

== SK 661 ==
Highway 661
- Length: 22 km (14 mi)

Highway 661 runs from the Highway 8 / Highway 49 junction at Pelly to Highway 753. It is about 22 kilometres (14 mi) long. An access road from Highway 661 leads to Fort Livingstone – the first capital of the North-West Territories from 1874 to 1876.

== SK 662 ==
Highway 662
- Length: 18 km (11 mi)

Highway 662 runs from Highway 49 near Stenen to Highway 753. It is about 18 kilometres (11 mi) long.

== SK 663 ==
Highway 663
- Length: 31 km (19 mi)

Highway 663 runs from Highway 11 near Dundurn north to Highway 16. It is about 32 kilometres (20 mi) long and runs along the routing of Range Road 3042.

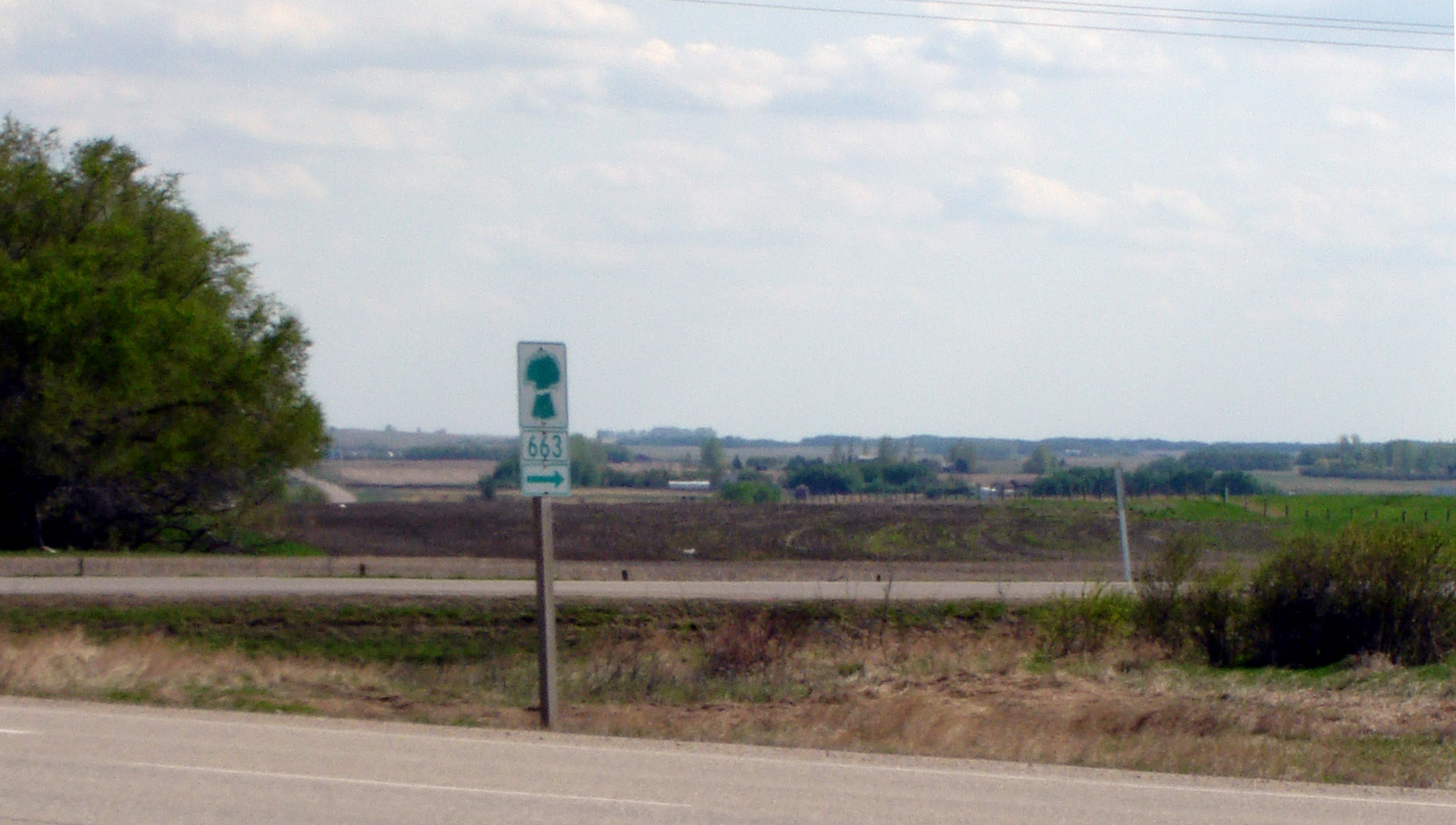
Highway 663 road sign located at Highway 16

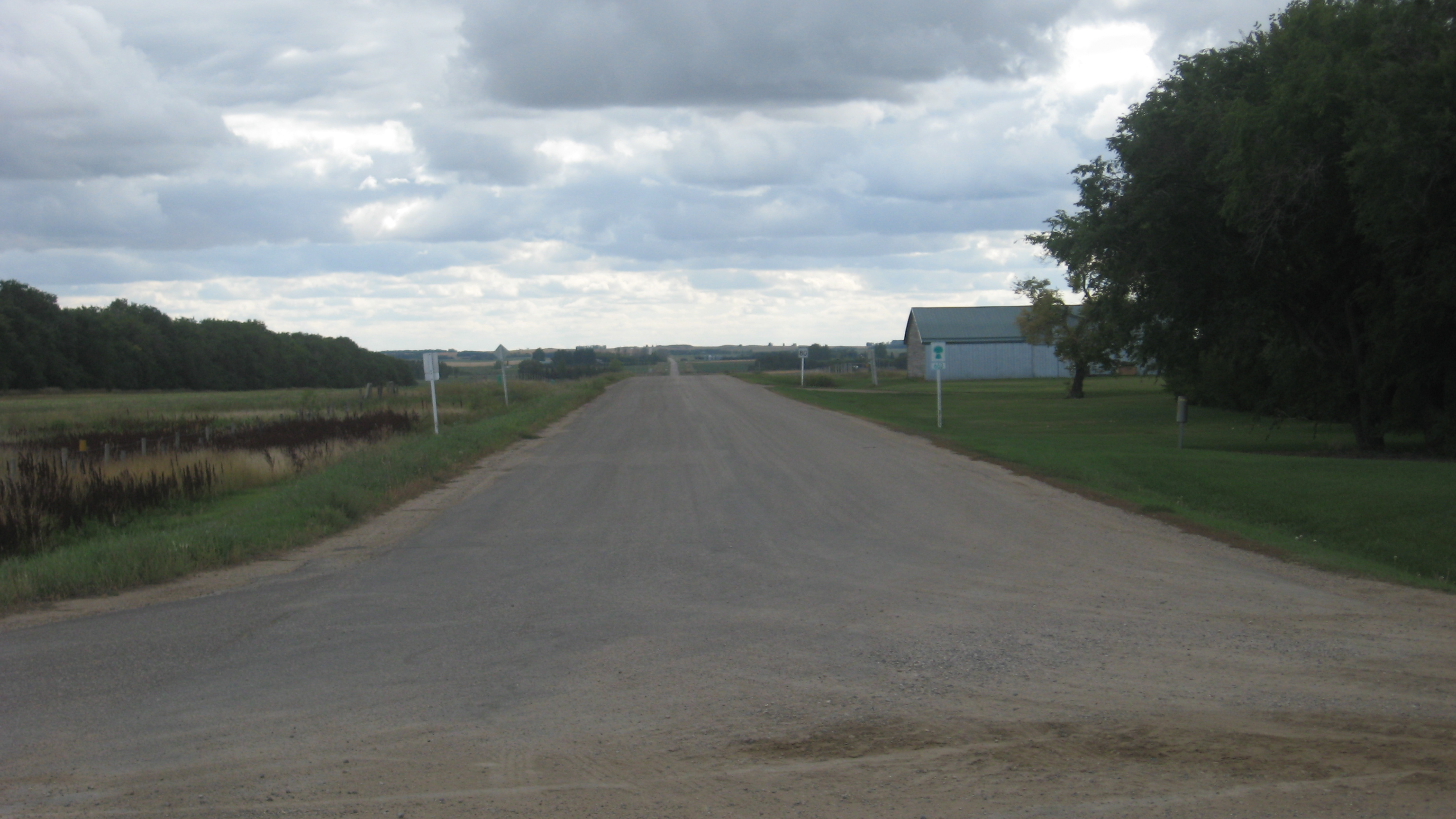

== SK 664 ==
Highway 664
- Length: 32 km (20 mi)

Highway 664 runs Highway 5 at Tiny north to Highway 9 / Highway 49 at Sturgis. Access to Sturgis & District Regional Park is from the highway. It is about 32 kilometres (20 mi) long.

== SK 665 ==
Highway 665
- Length: 28 km (17 mi)

Highway 665 runs from Highway 5 at Kylemore north to Highway 49. It is about 28 kilometres (17 mi) long.

== SK 667 ==
Highway 667
- Length: 40 km (25 mi)

Highway 667 runs from Highway 16 near Esk to Highway 5 near St. Gregor. Access to Leroy Leisureland Regional Park is where Highway 667 begins a concurrency with Highway 761. The highway is about 40 kilometres (25 mi) long.

== SK 668 ==
Highway 668
- Length: 37 km (23 mi)

Highway 668 runs from Highway 365 near Watrous to Highway 16 near Guernsey. The northern 3 kilometres (1.9 mi) used to be Highway 396 until it was combined into Highway 668. Highway 668 intersects Highway 761 and provides access to the Nutrien potash mine at Lanigan. It is about 37 kilometres (23 mi) long.

== SK 669 ==
Highway 669
- Length: 16 km (9.9 mi)

Highway 669 runs from Highway 5 to Highway 20. It is about 16 kilometres (9.9 mi) long.

== SK 670 ==
Highway 670
- Length: 28 km (17 mi)

Highway 670 runs from Highway 2 near Young to Highway 16 near Viscount. It is about 28 kilometres (17 mi) long.

== SK 671 ==
Highway 671
- Length: 30 km (19 mi)

Highway 671 runs from Highway 5 near St. Denis to Highway 41. About 18 kilometres (11 mi) north of Highway 5, Highway 671 passes through the town of Vonda and intersects Highway 27. The highway is about 30 kilometres (19 mi) long.

== SK 672 ==
Highway 672
- Length: 51 km (32 mi)

Highway 672 runs from Highway 762 and former Highway 7 alignment in Vanscoy to Highway 16 west of Langham. The goes north from Vanscoy for its first 15 kilometres (9.3 mi). It then runs concurrently with Highway 14 for 8 kilometres (5.0 mi) before taking another northbound route. At km 44, Highway 672 begins a 2-km concurrency with Highway 784. After this concurrency, Highway 672 goes north as the Ceepee Grid until its terminus at Highway 16. The highway is about 51 kilometres (32 mi) long.

== SK 673 ==
Highway 673
- Length: 28 km (17 mi)

Highway 673 runs from Railway Avenue (former Highway 7 alignment) in Delisle west for about 5.5 kilometres (3.4 mi) then north to Highway 14 near Asquith. It is about 28 kilometres (17 mi) long.

== SK 674 ==
Highway 674
- Length: 80 km (50 mi)

Highway 674 runs from Highway 40 near Cut Knife to Highway 697. Highways that connect with Highway 674 include Highways 16 and 26. Highway 674 crosses the North Saskatchewan River via the Paynton Ferry. The highway passes near the communities of Paynton and Edam, as well as the Little Pine Band and the Poundmaker Band. It is about 80 kilometres (50 mi) long.

== SK 675 ==
Highway 675
- Length: 250 km (160 mi)

Highway 675 runs from Highway 307 to Highway 798. It is about 250 kilometres (160 mi) long.

== SK 676 ==
Highway 676
- Length: 60 km (37 mi)

Highway 676 runs from Highway 14 south to Highway 51 near Major. It is about 60 kilometres (37 mi) long.

== SK 677 ==
Highway 677
- Length: 38 km (24 mi)

Highway 677 runs from Highway 23 at Carragana north to Highway 3 near Prairie River. The highway crosses the Red Deer River about 6 kilometres (3.7 mi) south of Highway 3. It is about 38 kilometres (24 mi) long.

== SK 678 ==
Highway 678
- Length: 43 km (27 mi)

Highway 678 runs from Highway 3 to Township Road 404 near High Tor. The highway intersects Highway 23 and passes through the town of Porcupine Plain. It is about 43 kilometres (27 mi) long.

== SK 679 ==
Highway 679
- Length: 36 km (22 mi)

Highway 679 runs from Highway 349 near Nobleville to Highway 23 near Bjorkdale. Highway 679 passes near Greenwater Lake Provincial Park and Marean Lake Resort. Marean Lake is accessible from the highway and Greenwater Provincial Park is off Highway 38. Highway 679 also has a four-kilometre Concurrency with Highway 773 just east of Pré-Ste-Marié. The highway is about 36 kilometres (22 mi) long.

== SK 680 ==
Highway 680
- Location: Rural Municipality of Heart's Hill No. 352, Rural Municipality of Eye Hill No. 382, Rural Municipality of Manitou Lake No. 442
- Length: 59.0 km (36.7 mi)

Highway 680 exists in two sections near the Alberta border, connected via Hwy 31, Hwy 17, and Township Road 432 through Macklin, SK and Butze, AB, totalling a length of 59.0 kilometres (36.7 mi).

=== Southern section ===
The southern section begins in the Rural Municipality of Heart's Hill No. 352 at an intersection with Hwy 317 south of the hamlet of Cactus Lake. It heads west along Township Road 360 as a two-lane gravel road for a couple kilometres before making a sharp right and heading due northward along Range Road 3283 as a paved two-lane highway, having a junction with the western end of Hwy 771 and passing through the hamlet of Cosine, where it crosses a former railway line. The highway crosses into the Rural Municipality of Eye Hill No. 382 shortly thereafter, travelling through rural farmland for several kilometres as it passes just to the west of Cactus Lake and crosses Hallam Lake via a causeway before coming to an end at an intersection with Hwy 31 just south of the town of Macklin. This southern section of Hwy 680 is approximately 37.6-kilometre-long (23.4 mi).

Rural municipality	Location	km	mi	Destinations	Notes
Heart's Hill No. 352		0.0	0.0	Highway 317 – Cactus Lake, Marengo	Southern terminus; southern end of unpaved section; road continues east as Township Road 360
Heart's Hill No. 352		8.2	5.1	Township Road 360 / Range Road 3283	Northern end of unpaved section
Heart's Hill No. 352		11.4	7.1	Highway 771 east (Township Road 362) – Luseland	Eastern terminus of Hwy 771
Heart's Hill No. 352		14.6	9.1	Township Road 364 – Cactus Lake	
Heart's Hill No. 352	Cosine	17.4	10.8	Railway Avenue	
Eye Hill No. 382		36.0– 36.6	22.4– 22.7	Causeway across Hallam Lake	
Eye Hill No. 382		37.6	23.4	Highway 31 – Macklin, Primate	Northern terminus of southern section; connection via Hwy 31, Hwy 17, and Township Road 432
1.000 mi = 1.609 km; 1.000 km = 0.621 mi

=== Northern section ===
The northern section of Hwy 680 begins at the Alberta border in the Rural Municipality of Manitou Lake No. 442, with the road continuing west for a short distance to the intersection of Hwy 17 and Alberta Highway 610 at Butze as Township Road 432. It heads northeast as a two-lane gravel road through rural prairie lands past the Reflex Lakes for a few kilometres before making a sharp left onto Artland Road (Range Road 3275) just north of the locality of Artland and Suffern Lake Regional Park, where it gains pavement. Heading due northward, the highway travels through rural farmland for several kilometres before coming to an end at an intersection with Hwy 40 (Poundmaker Trail) on the other side of Wells Lake from the village of Marsden. This northern section of Hwy 680 is approximately 21.4-kilometre-long (13.3 mi)

Rural municipality	Location	km	mi	Destinations	Notes
MD of Wainwright No. 61 (Alberta)		−3.2	−2.0	Highway 610 west – Rivercourse, Chauvin Highway 17 – Macklin, Lloydminster	Continuation into Alberta; continues as Highway 610
Manitou Lake No. 442		0.0	0.0	Alberta – Saskatchewan border	Southern terminus of northern section; southern end of unpaved section
Manitou Lake No. 442		8.5	5.3	Artland Road (Range Road 3275) – Artland, Suffern Lake Regional Park	Northern end of unpaved section
Manitou Lake No. 442		21.4	13.3	Highway 40 (Poundmaker Trail) – Wainwright, Marsden	Northern terminus; road continues north as Range Road 3275
1.000 mi = 1.609 km; 1.000 km = 0.621 mi: Closed/former

== SK 681 ==
Highway 681
- Length: 21 km (13 mi)

Highway 681 runs from Highway 776 to Highway 335. For a six-kilometre segment after its intersection with Highway 3, Highway 681 is the Star City access road. Highway 681 passes through Star City at the end of this segment. Highway 681 later passes through the community of Brooksby. It is about 44 kilometres (27 mi) long.

== SK 682 ==
Highway 682
- Length: 60 km (37 mi)

Highway 682 runs from Highway 41 near Meskanaw to the southern terminal of the Weldon Ferry across the South Saskatchewan River, which connects to Highway 302. Highway 682 also passes near the communities of Kinistino and Weldon. It connects with Highways 3 and 778. It is about 60 kilometres (37 mi) long.

== SK 683 ==
Highway 683
- Length: 20 km (12 mi)

Highway 683 runs from Highway 312 to Highway 212 near Titanic. It is about 20 kilometres (12 mi) long.

== SK 684 ==
Highway 684
- Length: 78 km (48 mi)

Highway 684 is the name given to two different highways in Saskatchewan. The north-western Highway 684 is approximately 57 kilometres (35 mi) long. It begins near Waseca at Highway 16 and it ends at Highway 3. The south-eastern Highway 684 is approximately 21 kilometres (13 mi) long. It begins at the junction of Highway 14 (22nd Street West) and Highway 7 inside Saskatoon (the junction, along with a stretch of Highway 684 extending northward beyond 33rd Street West, was annexed in the early 2000s, and ends at Highway 305, 3 km (1.9 mi) south of Dalmeny, and is unsigned. Long known as Dalmeny Road, in 2012 the section of Highway 684 within Saskatoon's city limits was renamed Neault Road.

The city of Saskatoon and the province plan to ultimately construct an interchange at the junction of Highway 684 and Highway 14 as part of the Blairmore Suburban Centre development and, in particular, the buildout of the Kensington neighbourhood. Concept maps indicate plans to reroute Highway 684 to link with the Yellowhead Highway at a junction with Marquis Road in north Saskatoon.

== SK 685 ==
Highway 685
- Length: 40 km (25 mi)

Highway 685 runs from Highway 16 near Borden to Highway 340. The highway passes through the rural municipalities of Great Bend No. 405 and Redberry No. 435. It is about 40 kilometres (25 mi) long.

== SK 686 ==
Highway 686
- Location: Meeting Lake No. 466
- Length: 22.7 km (14.1 mi)

Highway 686 runs from Highway 324 in Mayfair north to Highway 378 east of Meeting Lake. It is entirely a two-lane gravel road and is about 22.7 kilometres (14.1 mi) long.

Major intersections

The entire route is in Meeting Lake No. 466.

Location	km	mi	Destinations	Notes
Mayfair	0.0	0.0	Highway 324 (Township Road 464 / Range Road 3120) – Mayfair, The Battlefords; Township Road 464 – Ravenhead, Lorenzo, Sand Beach, Lucky Man Reserve, Lake Pitihkwakew 102B	Southern terminus; road continues as Hwy 324 eastbound
	10.8	6.7	Township Road 474 – Mullingar	
	22.7	14.1	Highway 378 – Rabbit Lake, Spiritwood	Northern terminus; road continues as northbound Hwy 378
1.000 mi = 1.609 km; 1.000 km = 0.621 mi

== SK 687 ==
Highway 687
- Length: 20 km (12 mi)

Highway 687 runs from Highway 16 near Denholm to Highway 378. The highway also connects with Highway 40. It is about 20 kilometres (12 mi) long.

== SK 688 ==
Highway 688
- Length: 41.3 km (25.7 mi)

Highway 688 begins at Highway 17 on the Alberta side of the border and heads in an easterly direction towards Lone Rock, Saskatchewan. About 6.5 kilometres (4.0 mi) east of Lone Rock, it heads north and intersects Highway 16 at Marshall. From Marshall, the highway continues north until its northern terminus at Highway 303. It is about 41.3 kilometres (25.7 mi) long.

== SK 689 ==
Highway 689
- Length: 20 km (12 mi)

Highway 689 runs from Highway 29 to Highway 40 near Prongu. It is about 20 kilometres (12 mi) long.

== SK 690 ==
Highway 690
- Length: 37.8 km (23.5 mi)

Highway 690 runs from Highway 23 near Arborfield in a zigzag pattern north-east to Highway 55 west of Smoky Burn. The highway passes through the RMs of Arborfield No. 456 and Moose Range No. 486. It is 37.8 kilometres (23.5 mi) long.

== SK 691 ==
Highway 691
- Length: 16 km (9.9 mi)

Highway 691 runs from Highway 55 near Snowden to Highway 106. It is about 16 kilometres (9.9 mi) long.

== SK 692 ==
Highway 692
- Length: 28 km (17 mi)

Highway 692 runs from Highway 55 near Choiceland to Highway 106. It is about 28 kilometres (17 mi) long. Highway 6's northern terminus is at Highway 692 in Choiceland.

== SK 693 ==
Highway 693
- Length: 37.8 km (23.5 mi)

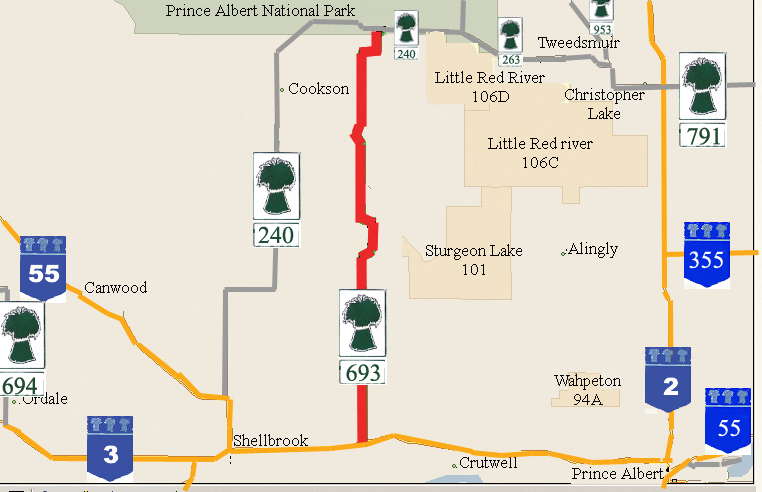
Highway 693

Highway 693 begins at the junction of the concurrency of Highway 55 and Highway 3 near Shellbrook in the RM of Shellbrook No. 493 and extends north 37.8 kilometres (23.5 mi) to Highway 240 in Prince Albert National Park. Shellbrook is west of the beginning terminus by 13.2 km (8.2 mi), and Crutwell is east 11.8 km (7.3 mi). At km 0.0, travel on Highway 693 is north. At km 17.8, Highway 693 turns east. At km 18.6, it returns to northward travel along the western edge of Sturgeon Lake Indian reserve. Highway 693 continues north until Km 21.8 when it turns west departing from the western boundary of the Indian reserve. At Km 24.4, Highway 693 travels north. Then at Km 40.4, it turns east for 1.5 km (0.93 mi). At Km 41.9, the highway returns to its northern routing. At Km 43.3, there is a turn in a north-east direction. The final mile post is Km 44.2 when Highway 693 connects with the terminal junction at Highway 240 in Prince Albert National Park. The highway is 44.2 kilometres (27.5 mi) long.

== SK 694 ==
Highway 694
- Length: 22.9 km (14.2 mi)

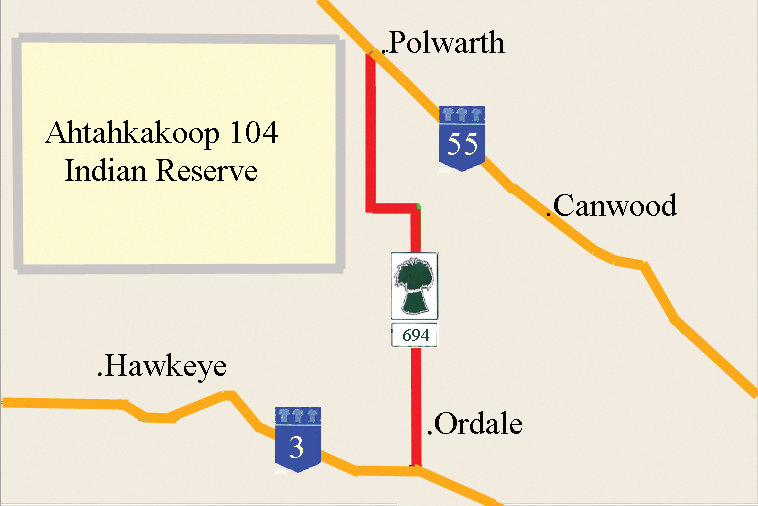
Highway 694

Highway 694 connects Highway 3 in the Rural Municipality of Canwood No. 494 to Highway 55 at Polwarth. South of Highway 55, Highway 694 is named Hilldrop Road.

Highway 694 begins west of Shellbrook and east of Shell Lake. The highway extends north 22.9 kilometres (14.2 mi) to the Highway 55 intersection. At Km 2.0, Highway 694 intersects with a range road which provides access to Ordale west of the highway. The highway turns sharply to the west at Km 13.2. It continues bearing west until Km 15.3 at which point it returns to the northerly direction. The Ahtahkakoop 104 Indian reserve is west of the highway. Continuing west on the range road will provide a thoroughfare into the Indian reserve. The terminus of Highway 694 is at Polwarth, at the Highway 5 intersection. The highway is about 22.9 kilometres (14.2 mi) long.

== SK 695 ==
Highway 695
- Length: 28 km (17 mi)

Highway 695 runs from Highway 3 to Highway 793 near Victoire. The highway provides access to Morin Lake Regional Park, passes near the community of Shell Lake, and through the Big River Indian reserve. It is about 28 kilometres (17 mi) long.

== SK 696 ==
Highway 696
- Length: 31 km (19 mi)

Highway 696 runs from Highway 3 to Highway 24. The highway passes through the community of Ranger. It is about 31 kilometres (19 mi) long.

== SK 697 ==
Highway 697
- Length: 75 km (47 mi)

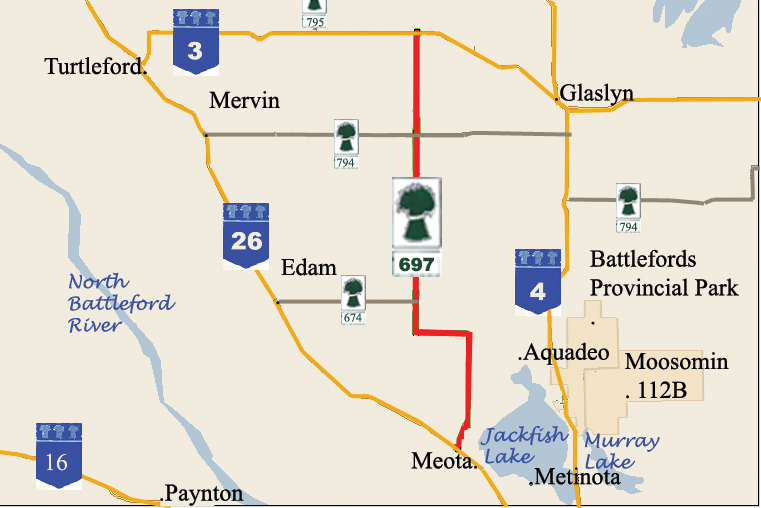
Highway 697

Highway 697 travels from Highway 26 in the RM of Meota No. 468 to near Turtle View at Turtle Lake in the RM of Parkdale No. 498. It is located in the north-western region of Saskatchewan, west of North Battleford.

The highway begins by heading in a northerly direction at the intersection with Highway 26. To the west along Highway 26 is the town of Vawn, and to the east along highway 26 is the town of Meota. The beginning terminus circumnavigates around the western shoreline of Jackfish Lake. At Km 11.3, Highway 697 turns west sharply. At Km 16.1, Highway 697 then returns to its northerly routing. At Km 19.3, the highway meets with the junction with Highway 674. At Km 35.5, Highway 697 intersects with Highway 794. Travel west on Highway 794 provides access to the town of Mervin, travel east on Highway 794 provides joins Highway 4 south of the town of Glaslyn. At Km 45.4, Highway 697 meets Highway 3 where it has a short 2-mile concurrency to the west. At that point, the highway resumes its northerly routing towards Turtle Lake where it provides access to the lake's eastern shore and its amenities.

Communities along the highway include Jackfish Lake, Minnehaha, Moosomin 112K Indian reserve, Longhope, and Turtle View. Near the highway's northern terminus is Turtle Lake Recreation Site. Highway 697 is about 75 kilometres (47 mi) long.

== SK 698 ==
Highway 698
- Length: 13 km (8.1 mi)

Highway 698 runs from Highway 55 to Highway 799. The highway is the only access road to the community of Matchee. It is about 13 kilometres (8.1 mi) long.

== SK 699 ==
Highway 699
- Length: 58 km (36 mi)

Highway 699 runs from Highway 21 to Highway 55. The western end of Highway 699 begins at Highway 21 near Ministikwan Lake and then passes through the villages of Whelan and Loon Lake as it heads east. The highway provides access to Murphy Lake, Fowler Lake, Makwa Lake, Jumbo Lake, Little Jumbo Lake, Makwa Sahgaiehcan First Nation, and the provincial parks of Makwa Lake and Steele Narrows. For 1 kilometre (0.62 mi) east of Loon Lake, Highway 699 runs concurrently with Highway 26. The last community that Highway 699 passes through after Highway 26 is Loon River, which is near its terminus at Highway 55. The highway is about 58 kilometres (36 mi) long.

== See also ==
- List of Saskatchewan municipal roads (700–799)
- List of Saskatchewan provincial highways
- Roads in Saskatchewan
