= Division No. 4, Saskatchewan =

Census division in Canada

Coordinates: 49°54′13″N 109°28′47″W

Division No. 4
- Census division in Saskatchewan
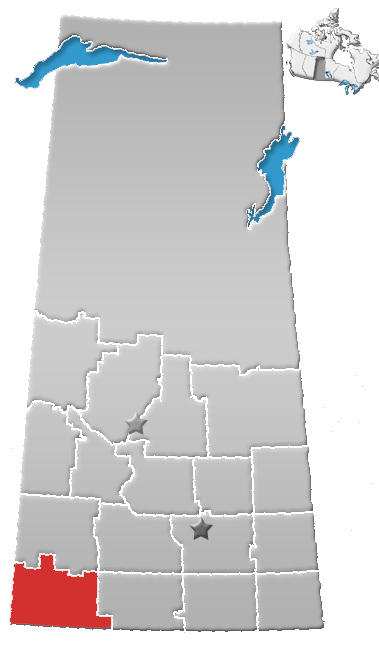
- Country: Canada
- Province: Saskatchewan

Area
  - Total: 21,149.45 km^{2} (8,165.85 sq mi)
- As of 2021

Population (2021)
  - Total: 10,872
  - Density: 0.51406/km^{2} (1.3314/sq mi)

Division No. 4 is one of eighteen census divisions in the province of Saskatchewan, Canada, as defined by Statistics Canada. It is located in the southwest corner of the province, bordering Alberta to the west and Montana, United States, to the south. The most populous community in this division is Maple Creek.

== Demographics ==
In the 2021 Census of Population conducted by Statistics Canada, Division No. 4 had a population of 10,872 living in 4,204 of its 5,337 total private dwellings, a change of 0.2% from its 2016 population of 10,854. With a land area of 21,149.45 km^{2} (8,165.85 sq mi), it had a population density of 0.5/km^{2} (1.3/sq mi) in 2021.

Knowledge of languages in Division No. 4 (1991−2021)
Language	2021		2011		2001		1991	
Language	Pop.	%	Pop.	%	Pop.	%	Pop.	%
English	9,285	99.95%	10,670	99.35%	11,475	99.48%	12,550	99.48%
French	240	2.58%	280	2.61%	415	3.6%	605	4.8%
Tagalog	245	2.64%	165	1.54%	10	0.09%	15	0.12%
Cree (Note: Combined responses of the Cree-Innu languages, previously categorized under "Cree" in past censuses.)	120	1.29%	60	0.56%	115	1%	90	0.71%
German (Note: Combined responses of the High German languages, including Standard German, Pennsylvania German, Swiss German, and Yiddish.)	115	1.24%	235	2.19%	1,320	11.44%	1,275	10.11%
Chinese (Note: Combined responses of the Chinese languages, including Mandarin, Cantonese, Min Nan, Hakka, Wu (Shanghainese), Min Dong, Chinese, n.o.s., and Chinese languages, n.i.e..)	65	0.7%	0	0%	40	0.35%	70	0.55%
Spanish	40	0.43%	0	0%	40	0.35%	10	0.08%
Hindustani (Note: Combined responses of Hindi and Urdu as they form mutually intelligible registers of the Hindustani language.)	15	0.16%	0	0%	0	0%	0	0%
Ukrainian	10	0.11%	0	0%	50	0.43%	65	0.52%
Arabic	10	0.11%	0	0%	10	0.09%	10	0.08%
Dutch	10	0.11%	0	0%	0	0%	10	0.08%
Greek	0	0%	0	0%	30	0.26%	0	0%
Portuguese	0	0%	0	0%	20	0.17%	0	0%
Russian	0	0%	0	0%	10	0.09%	30	0.24%
Polish	0	0%	0	0%	10	0.09%	10	0.08%
Hungarian	0	0%	0	0%	0	0%	10	0.08%
Total responses	9,290	85.45%	10,740	98.72%	11,535	98.47%	12,615	98.61%
Total population	10,872	100%	10,879	100%	11,714	100%	12,793	100%

== Census subdivisions ==
The following census subdivisions (municipalities or municipal equivalents) are located within Saskatchewan's Division No. 4.

=== Towns ===
- Eastend
- Maple Creek
- Shaunavon

=== Villages ===
- Bracken
- Cadillac
- Carmichael
- Climax
- Consul
- Frontier
- Neville
- Val Marie

=== Rural municipalities ===
- RM No. 17 Val Marie
- RM No. 18 Lone Tree
- RM No. 19 Frontier
- RM No. 49 White Valley
- RM No. 51 Reno
- RM No. 77 Wise Creek
- RM No. 78 Grassy Creek
- RM No. 79 Arlington
- RM No. 107 Lac Pelletier
- RM No. 108 Bone Creek
- RM No. 109 Carmichael
- RM No. 110 Piapot
- RM No. 111 Maple Creek

=== Other communities ===
Special service areas

- Admiral

Organized hamlets

- Darlings Beach

Hamlets

- Orkney
- Piapot
- Simmie

Unincorporated communities

- Battle Creek
- Beaver Valley
- Belanger
- Blumenort
- Canuck
- Carnagh
- Claydon
- Cross
- Cummings
- Divide
- Dollard
- East Fairwell
- Edgell
- Fort Walsh, National historic site
- Garden Head
- Govenlock
- Hatton
- Hillandale
- Illerbrun
- Instow
- Kealey Springs
- Klintonel
- Lac Pelletier
- Loomis
- Masefield
- Merryflat
- Nashlyn
- Neighbour
- Neuhoffnung
- Olga
- Oxarat
- Palisade
- Rangeview
- Ravenscrage
- Robsart
- Rosefield
- Scotsguard
- Senate
- Sidewood
- Skull Creek
- South Fork
- Staynor Hall
- Vidora
- West Plains
- Willow Creek

=== Indian reserves ===
- Nekaneet Cree Nation
  - Nekaneet Reserve
- Little Pine First Nation
  - Little Pine 116
- Carry the Kettle Nakoda Nation
  - Carry the Kettle 76-7
  - Carry the Kettle 76-69
  - Carry the Kettle 76-70
  - Carry the Kettle 76-71
  - Carry the Kettle 76-72
  - Carry the Kettle 76-73
  - Carry the Kettle 76-74
  - Carry the Kettle 76-75
  - Carry the Kettle 76-76
  - Carry the Kettle 76-77
  - Carry the Kettle 76-78
  - Carry the Kettle 76-79
  - Carry the Kettle 76-80
  - Carry the Kettle 76-81
  - Carry the Kettle 76-82
  - Carry the Kettle 76-84

== See also ==
- List of census divisions of Saskatchewan
- List of communities in Saskatchewan
