= Saskatchewan Highway 343 =

Provincial highway in Saskatchewan, Canada

Highway 343

Route information
- Maintained by Ministry of Highways and Infrastructure
- Length: 33.8 km (21.0 mi)

Major junctions
- West end: Highway 631 at Simmie
- East end: Highway 4 near Blumenort

Location
- Country: Canada
- Province: Saskatchewan
- Rural municipalities: Bone Creek, Webb, Lac Pelletier

Highway system
- Provincial highways in Saskatchewan
← Highway 342	→ Highway 349

Highway 343 is a provincial highway in the Canadian province of Saskatchewan. It runs from Highway 4 near Blumenort to Simmie near Highway 631. It is about 34 kilometres (21 mi) long.

The highway provides access to Lac Pelletier Regional Park and connects to Highway 630.

== Route description ==
Hwy 343 begins in the Rural Municipality of Bone Creek No. 108 at an intersection with Hwy 631 just west of Simmie, heading east as a two-lane gravel road to pass through the hamlet, where it gains asphalt and makes a sharp left, heading north to cross a former railway line and enter into the Rural Municipality of Webb No. 138. The highway goes through a switchback before curving eastward, having an intersection with Range Road 3161, which provides access to Sunridge Resort, before entering the Rural Municipality of Lac Pelletier No. 107. Continuing on through rural areas, Hwy 343 curves northward for a short distance before making a sharp right turn at the junction with Hwy 630 at the locality of Vesper, travelling due eastward to cross the Pelletier Creek Valley just to the immediate north of Lac Pelletier, where it has an intersection with Maple Drive, which provides access to Lac Pelletier Regional Park, Darlings Beach, Camp Elim, and Camp Lemieux, before coming to an end at an intersection with Hwy 4 just to the north of Blumenort and just to the west of Blumenhof. The road continues east into Blumenhof as Township Road 124.

== Major intersections ==
From west to east:

Rural municipality	Location	km	mi	Destinations	Notes
Bone Creek No. 108		0.0	0.0	Highway 631 (Range Road 3163) – Scotsguard, Ferguson Bay, Gull Lake	Western terminus; western end of unpaved section
Bone Creek No. 108	Simmie	0.8	0.50	Eastern end of unpaved section	
Webb No. 138		7.8	4.8	Range Road 3161 – Sunridge Resort	
Lac Pelletier No. 107	Vesper	15.8	9.8	Highway 630 north – Duncairn Dam, Beverley	Southern terminus of Hwy 630
Lac Pelletier No. 107		22.0	13.7	Maple Drive – Lac Pelletier Regional Park, Darlings Beach, Camp Elim, Camp Lemieux	
Lac Pelletier No. 107		33.8	21.0	Highway 4 – Swift Current, Cadillac; Township Road 124 – Blumenhof	Eastern terminus; road continues east as Township Road 124.
1.000 mi = 1.609 km; 1.000 km = 0.621 mi

== See also ==
- Transportation in Saskatchewan
- Roads in Saskatchewan
