= Lac Pelletier =

Lake in Saskatchewan, Canada

- Location in Saskatchewan Lac Pelletier (Canada)
- Location: RM of Lac Pelletier No. 107, Saskatchewan
- Coordinates: 49.9834°N 107.9340°W
- Part of: Saskatchewan River drainage basin
- Primary inflows: Spring fed
- Primary outflows: Pelletier Creek
- Basin countries: Canada
- Surface area: 301.9 ha (746 acres)
- Max. depth: 9.2 m (30 ft)
- Shore length^{1}: 12 km (7.5 mi)
- Surface elevation: 851 m (2,792 ft)
- Settlements: Darlings Beach
- ^{1} Shore length is not a well-defined measure.

Lac Pelletier is a natural, spring fed lake in the south-west region of the Canadian province of Saskatchewan. It is located in the RM of Lac Pelletier No. 107 in the semi arid Palliser's Triangle. The lake is named after Norbert Pelletier, who was a Métis man that held the first land grant in the area. The lake has one community, a regional park, and two Bible camps along its shores. Access to the lake and its amenities is from Highway 343.

== Description ==
Lac Pelletier sits in a glacial spillway in the Swift Current Creek drainage basin. In 1937, a low dam was built at the lake's northern end that raised the water level by about 60 centimetres (24 in). The dam was rebuilt in 1956. When the water levels reach a wooden culvert at the dam, water is released into Pelletier Creek which flows through the valley until it meets the Swift Current Creek north-east and down stream from Reid Lake. The dam was operated by the Prairie Farm Rehabilitation Administration from 1938 until the 1970s, at which point Lac Pelletier Regional Park took control.

On the eastern shore of the lake is the community of Darlings Beach. Lac Pelletier Regional Park and the associated golf course are on the eastern and southern shores. There are over 300 cottages around the lake. Camp Lemieux is on the western shore and Camp Elim is on the northern shore.

== Lac Pelletier Regional Park ==
Lac Pelletier Regional Park (49.9839°N 107.9256°W), founded in 1964, is a regional park on the eastern and southern shores of Lac Pelletier. The park has a golf course, cottages, lake access, a campground, and hiking trails.

There are four campgrounds with 224 campsites, electric hookups, and modern washrooms / showers. The park also has two beaches, boat launches, playgrounds, mini golf, and two pickleball courts.

Lac Pelletier Regional Park Golf Club, built in 1965, is a 9-hole, grass greens course. It has a licensed clubhouse, rentals, and is a par 35 with 3,058 total yards.

== Fish species ==
Fish commonly found in the lake include walleye, northern pike, whitefish, and yellow perch.

== See also ==
- List of lakes of Saskatchewan
- List of golf courses in Saskatchewan
