= Palisade, Saskatchewan =

Community in Saskatchewan, Canada

Palisade
- Unincorporated community
- Location of Palisade in Saskatchewan
- Coordinates: 49.250°N 109.100°W
- Country: Canada
- Province: Saskatchewan
- Region: Southwest Saskatchewan
- Census division: 4
- Rural Municipality: Reno

Government
  - Administrator: Lacelle Kim
  - Governing body: Reno No. 51
- Time zone: CST
- Area code: 306
- Waterways: Cypress Lake Middle Creek

Palisade is an unincorporated community within the Rural Municipality of Reno No. 51, Saskatchewan, Canada. The town site (33-5-24-W3) is located 5 kilometres (3.1 mi) north of Highway 13, about 40 kilometres (25 mi) west of the town of Eastend.

== Education ==
Palisade no longer has a school, but those who live in the surrounding area are sent to the neighbouring village of Consul, which has a school that covers Kindergarten to Grade 12 serving approximately 100 students.

== See also ==
- List of communities in Saskatchewan
- Lists of ghost towns in Canada
- List of ghost towns in Saskatchewan
