= Lawrence Lake =

Lawrence Lake may refer to:

- Lawrence Lake, in the Houston County, Minnesota, USA
- Lawrence Lake (Saskatchewan), in the southwestern part of the province in or near the municipality Arlington No. 79
- Lawrence Lake (Algoma District), Ontario
- Lawrence Lake (Sudbury District), Ontario
- Lawrence Lake (Haliburton County), Ontario
- Lawrence Lake (Hill Lake, Kenora District), Ontario
- Lawrence Lake (Bloodvein River, Kenora District), Ontario
