= Battle Creek (Milk River tributary) =

River in central North America

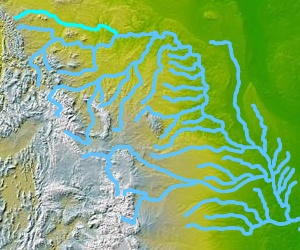
- The Milk River shown highlighted

- Location of mouth in Montana Battle Creek (Milk River tributary) (North America)

Location
- Countries: United States and Canada
- State: Montana
- Province: Alberta; Saskatchewan

Physical characteristics
- Source: Cypress Hills
  - location: 49°37′44″N 110°13′14″W
- Mouth: Milk River
  - location: Blaine County, Montana
  - coordinates: 48°34′39″N 109°06′26″W
- Length: 203 km (126 mi)
- Basin size: 2,600 km^{2} (1,000 sq mi)

Basin features
- River system: Missouri River

Battle Creek is a river that begins in the south-eastern region of the Canadian province of Alberta, near the border with Saskatchewan, in the Cypress Hills Interprovincial Park. From Alberta, Battle Creek flows east and across the border into Saskatchewan. It flows south out of Saskatchewan across the Canada–United States border into Montana, where it joins the Milk River in Blaine County, Montana.

== Description ==
Battle Creek begins in the Cypress Hills and Palliser's Triangle region of Alberta, is 203 kilometres (126 mi) long, has a drainage area of 2,600 square kilometres (1,000 sq mi), and flows through Alberta, Saskatchewan, and Montana en route to its mouth at the Milk River. The landscape it runs though is semi-arid with rolling hills, deep-cut valleys, coulees, badlands, and grasslands. Due to the semi-arid climate, the area is prone to drought so several dams and irrigation projects have been built in its watershed. In the 1930s, two notable dam projects were built to help regulate the river's water levels. Near the headwaters of Battle Creek, a dam was built along Adams Creek – a tributary of Battle Creek – that created Adams Lake (49.6582°N 109.8455°W). During the dry months, water can be released from Adams Lake to help prevent Battle Creek from dying up, which allows for irrigation throughout the growing season. Another project involved the building of two dams that created Cypress Lake. Cypress Lake, while not along the course of Battle Creek, is supplied by Battle Creek plus other nearby creeks. Cypress Lake is an interbasin transfer reservoir as it is the source of the Frenchman River and can re-supply Battle Creek during dry years.

Battle Creek and the other tributaries of the Milk River watershed in Alberta and Saskatchewan, is one of only three watersheds in Canada where the water ultimately flows into the Gulf of Mexico. The other two watersheds are Poplar River and Big Muddy Creek.

Near the community of Nashlyn in Saskatchewan, Battle Creek flows through a portion of the Govenlock-Nashlyn-Battle Creek Grasslands Important Bird Area (IBA) of Canada.

Fort Walsh was established on the river on the Saskatchewan side of Cypress Hills Interprovincial Park.

== Fish species ==
Fish species commonly found in the river include northern pike, rainbow trout, brook trout, brown trout, burbot, common carp, white sucker, and shorthead redhorse. The Battle Creek, along with Lake Diefenbaker, are the only two bodies of water in Saskatchewan that support a reproducing population of rainbow trout. There is concern that Asian carp, particularly silver carp, may spread up the river and to the other south flowing rivers that drain into the Milk River, such as the Frenchman River.

== See also ==
- List of rivers of Saskatchewan
- List of rivers of Alberta
- List of rivers of Montana
- List of tributaries of the Missouri River
