= Blumenort =

Blumenort can refer to:

- Blumenort, Manitoba
- Blumenort, Saskatchewan
