= Oxarat =

Community in Saskatchewan, Canada

- Unincorporated community
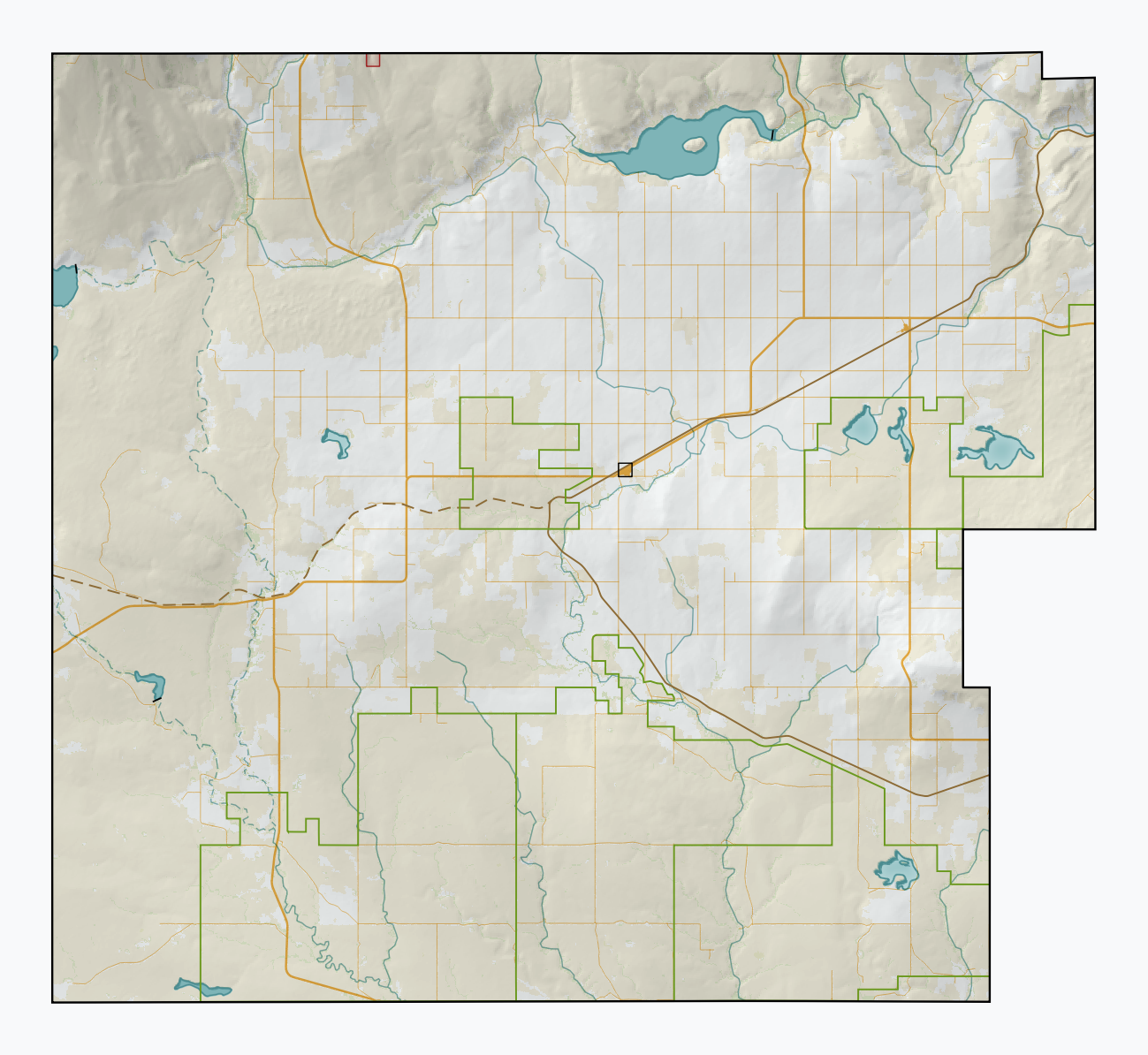
- Location within Reno No. 51 Location within Saskatchewan
- Coordinates: 49.433°N 109.584°W
- Country: Canada
- Province: Saskatchewan
- Region: Southwest
- Census division: 4
- Rural Municipality: Reno
- Established: 1910

Government
  - Administrator: Lacelle Kim
  - Governing body: Reno No. 51

Population (2006)
  - Total: 0
- Time zone: CST
- Postal code: S0N 2G0
- Area code: 306
- Highways: TWP Rd. 60
- Railways: None

Oxarat is an unincorporated community within Rural Municipality of Reno No. 51, Saskatchewan, Canada. The former town-site is located 15 km west of Highway 21, about 15 kilometres (9.3 mi) north of the village of Consul and Highway 13.

== Population ==
Oxarat, like many other communities throughout Saskatchewan, has struggled to maintain a sturdy population causing it to become a ghost town, with few or no residents.

== Education ==
Oxarat no longer has a school, but those who may live in Oxarat and area are sent to the neighboring village of Consul which has a school that covers Kindergarten to Grade 12 serving approximately 100 students.

== See also ==
- List of communities in Saskatchewan
