= Rangeview =

- Unincorporated community
- Location of Rangeview in Saskatchewan
- Coordinates: 49.2°N 109.351°W
- Country: Canada
- Province: Saskatchewan
- Region: Southwest Saskatchewan
- Census division: 4
- Rural Municipality: Reno

Government
  - Governing body: Rural Municipality of Reno
- Time zone: CST
- Area code: 306
- Railways: Former - Canadian Pacific Railway

Rangeview is an unincorporated community within the Rural Municipality of Reno No. 51, Saskatchewan, Canada. The former townsite is located 5 km west of Highway 18, about 15 km south of the community of Robsart and Highway 13.

== Education ==
Rangeview no longer has a school. Those who live in Rangeview and area are sent to the neighbouring village of Consul which has a Kindergarten to Grade 12 school serving approximately 100 students.

== See also ==
- List of communities in Saskatchewan
