= Rural Municipality of Reno No. 51 =

Rural municipality in Saskatchewan, Canada

Reno No. 51 RM of Reno
- Rural municipality
- Rural Municipality of Reno No. 51
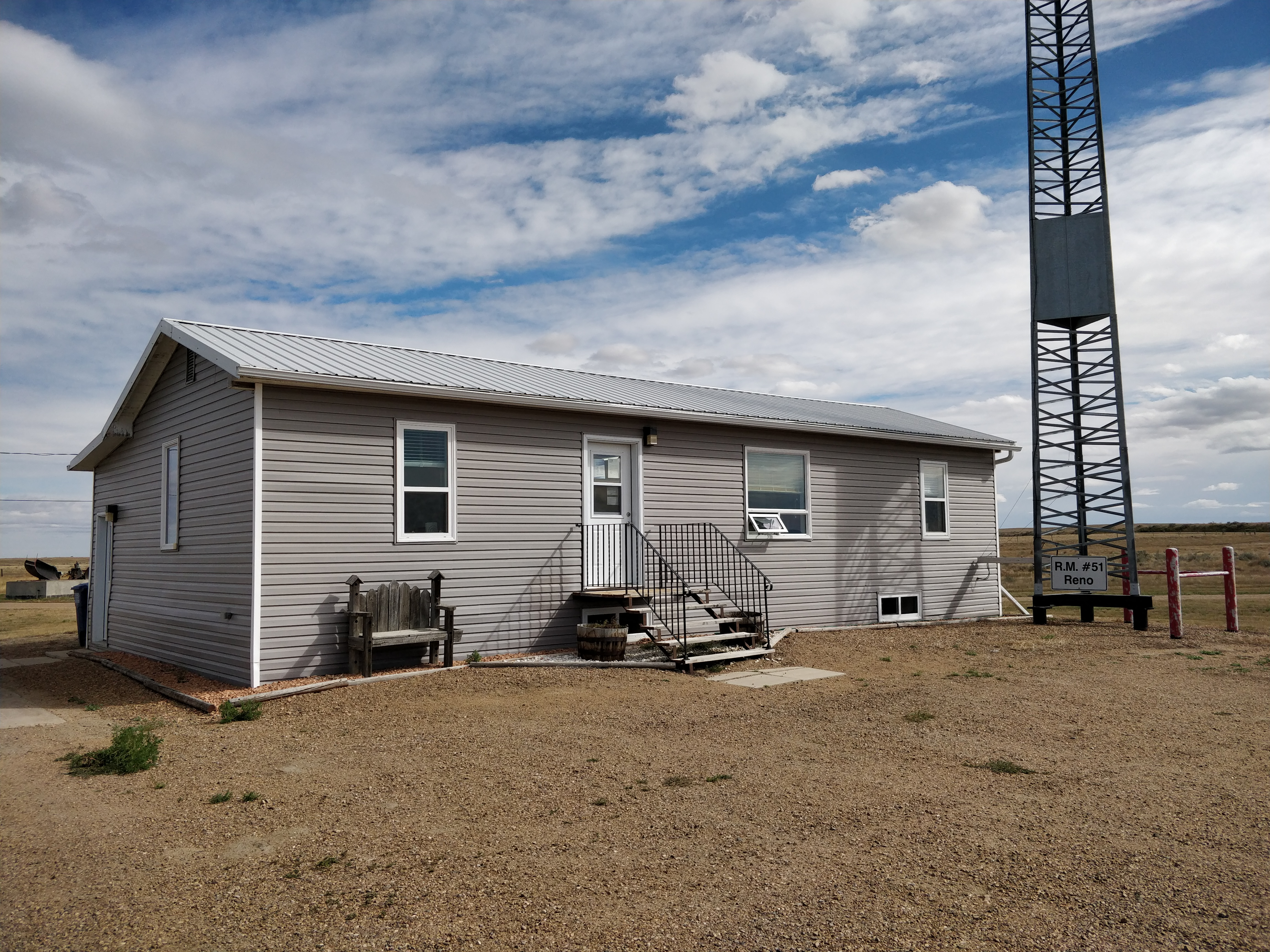
- RM office in Consul

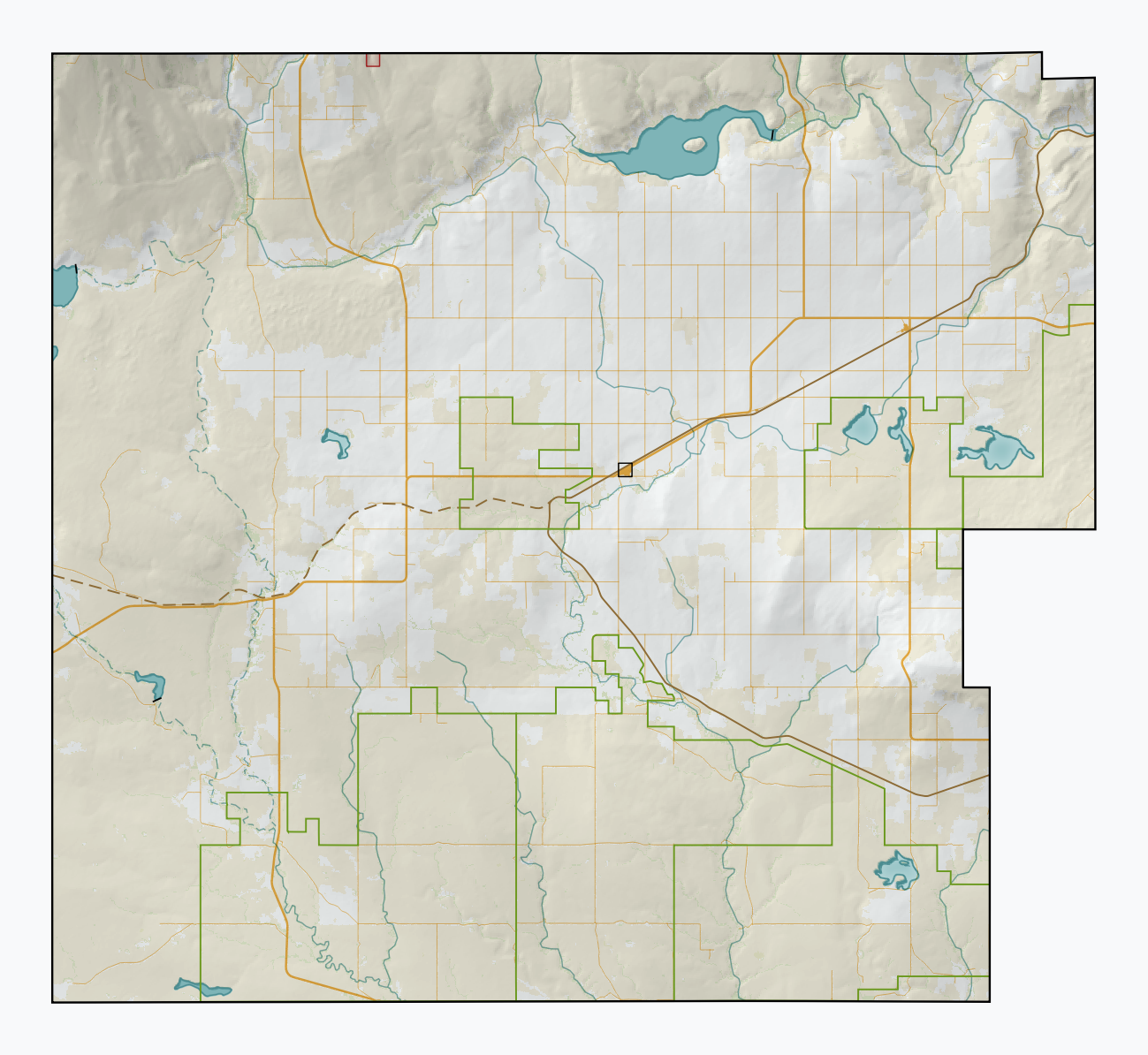

- Location of the RM of Reno No. 51 in Saskatchewan
- Coordinates: 49.342°N 109.551°W
- Country: Canada
- Province: Saskatchewan
- Census division: 4
- SARM division: 3
- Federal riding: Cypress Hills—Grasslands
- Provincial riding: Cypress Hills
- Formed: December 11, 1911

Government
  - Reeve: Brian McMillan
  - Governing body: RM of Reno No. 51 Council
  - Administrator: Tanya Howell
  - Office location: Consul

Area (2016)
  - Land: 3,461.61 km^{2} (1,336.54 sq mi)

Population (2021)
  - Total: 343
  - Density: 0.1/km^{2} (0.26/sq mi)
- Time zone: CST
  - Summer (DST): CST
- Postal code: S0N 0P0
- Area codes: 306 and 639
- Highway(s): Highway 13; Highway 18; Highway 21; Highway 615
- Waterway(s): Cypress Lake; Battle Creek

The Rural Municipality of Reno No. 51 (2021 population: 343) is a rural municipality (RM) in the Canadian province of Saskatchewan within Census Division No. 4 and SARM Division No. 3. Located in the southwest corner of the province, it is adjacent to the United States border to the south and the Alberta boundary to the west.

== History ==
The RM of Reno No. 51 incorporated as a rural municipality on December 11, 1911. Reno, Nevada and Reno County, Kansas are both named for Jesse Lee Reno, a Union general in the American Civil War. However, no record exists of why the Saskatchewan RM's name might derive from this source. An alternative explanation is that RENO is an acronym of four rural post offices in the vicinity - Russthorn (near Robsart), Eden Valley (southwest of Cypress Lake), Nashlyn (south of Consul), and Oxarat (west of Cypress Lake). Although Nashlyn then lay outside the boundary of the RM, similar acronymic names are not unknown on the Canadian prairies; see also Sangudo, Alberta.

== Geography ==
The RM of Reno No. 51 is in the southwest corner of the province. It neighbours Hill County and Blaine County in Montana to the south and Cypress County in Alberta to the west. Within Saskatchewan, it is adjacent to the RMs of Maple Creek No. 111, White Valley No. 49, and Frontier No. 19.

=== Communities and localities ===
The following urban municipalities are surrounded by the RM.

Villages

- Consul

The following unincorporated communities are located in the RM.

Localities

- Altwan
- Battle Creek
- Govenlock, dissolved as a village January 1, 1976
- Merryflat
- Nashlyn
- Notukeu
- Oxarat
- Palisade
- Rangeview
- Robsart, dissolved as a village January 1, 2002
- Senate, dissolved as a village January 1, 1994
- Supreme
- Tyro
- Vidora, dissolved as a village January 1, 1952
- West Plains
- Willow Creek

=== Climate ===
Climate data for WILLOW CREEK, SK (~Southwestern Reno No. 51, 1971-2000 Normals)
Month	Jan	Feb	Mar	Apr	May	Jun	Jul	Aug	Sep	Oct	Nov	Dec	Year
Mean daily maximum °C (°F)	−5.4 (22.3)	−1.6 (29.1)	4.8 (40.6)	13.5 (56.3)	19.3 (66.7)	24.1 (75.4)	27.8 (82.0)	27.7 (81.9)	20.9 (69.6)	13.3 (55.9)	2.3 (36.1)	−3.3 (26.1)	12 (54)
Mean daily minimum °C (°F)	−17.8 (0.0)	−14.4 (6.1)	−7.8 (18.0)	−1.8 (28.8)	3.9 (39.0)	8.3 (46.9)	10.6 (51.1)	9.8 (49.6)	3.8 (38.8)	−2.2 (28.0)	−10 (14)	−16.1 (3.0)	−2.8 (27.0)
Average precipitation mm (inches)	12.4 (0.49)	7.8 (0.31)	16 (0.6)	15.6 (0.61)	47.1 (1.85)	60.6 (2.39)	41.3 (1.63)	30.9 (1.22)	32.3 (1.27)	16.3 (0.64)	17 (0.7)	16.6 (0.65)	313.8 (12.35)
Source: Environment Canada

== Demographics ==
Population history (1981–2016)
Year	Pop.	±%
1981	648	—
1986	594	−8.3%
1991	574	−3.4%
1996	539	−6.1%
2001	442	−18.0%
2006	462	+4.5%
2011	399	−13.6%
2016	379	−5.0%
2021	343	−9.5%
Source: Statistics Canada via Saskatchewan Bureau of Statistics

In the 2021 Census of Population conducted by Statistics Canada, the RM of Reno No. 51 had a population of 343 living in 144 of its 175 total private dwellings, a change of −9.5% from its 2016 population of 379. With a land area of 3,424.73 km^{2} (1,322.30 sq mi), it had a population density of 0.1/km^{2} (0.3/sq mi) in 2021.

In the 2016 Census of Population, the RM of Reno No. 51 recorded a population of 379 living in 156 of its 179 total private dwellings, a −5% change from its 2011 population of 399. With a land area of 3,461.61 km^{2} (1,336.54 sq mi), it had a population density of 0.1/km^{2} (0.3/sq mi) in 2016.

== Attractions and parks ==
- Red Coat Trail
- Robsart Art Works
- Old Man on His Back Prairie and Heritage Conservation Area
- Cypress Lake Recreation Site
- Heglund Island Wildlife Refuge

== Govenlock-Nashlyn-Battle Creek Grasslands IBA ==
Govenlock-Nashlyn-Battle Creek Grasslands (SK 039) is an Important Bird Area (IBA) of Canada located at the south-western corner of the RM of Reno. It is a rectangular-shaped IBA site with the southern boundary running along the border with Montana. The western boundary runs up for 35 kilometres (22 mi) along the border with Alberta and the northern boundary (township 6) extends straight along the southern boundary of the RM of Maple Creek #111, for 64 kilometres (40 mi). Then south to the Montana border. The site totals 840.03 km^{2} (324.34 sq mi) and has an elevation range of 903 to 1,001 metres. Access is from Highway 21.

The landscape of Govenlock-Nashlyn-Battle Creek Grasslands consists of large expanses of native grassland and rugged valleys with steep cliffs and cut banks. Originating from the Cypress Hills to the north, several of the streams that run through the site have been dammed to provide water for cattle. McRae, Lodge, and Middle Creeks are the primary waterways through the site while Battle Creek skirts the north-eastern edge. A variety of birds are found in the IBA, including the sage grouse, prairie falcon, golden eagle, ferruginous hawk, violet-green swallow, burrowing owl, rock wren, short-eared owl, sage thrasher, rough-legged hawk, long-billed curlew, Sprague's pipit, Baird's sparrow, Brewer's sparrow, chestnut-collared longspur, McCown's longspur, and the Bullock's oriole. The creeks and dams also provide important habit for fawning and wintering pronghorn.

== Government ==
The RM of Reno No. 51 is governed by an elected municipal council and an appointed administrator that meets on the second Wednesday of every month. The reeve of the RM is Brian McMillan while its administrator is Tanya Howell. The RM's office is located in Consul.

== Transportation ==
The following is a list of Saskatchewan highways, railways, and other forms of transportation that service the area.

- Highway 13
- Highway 18
- Highway 21
- Highway 615
- Highway 271
- Great Western Railway – a Canadian short line railway company operating on former Canadian Pacific Railway trackage in southwest Saskatchewan

== See also ==
- List of rural municipalities in Saskatchewan
