= Nashlyn =

Community in Saskatchewan, Canada

- Unincorporated community
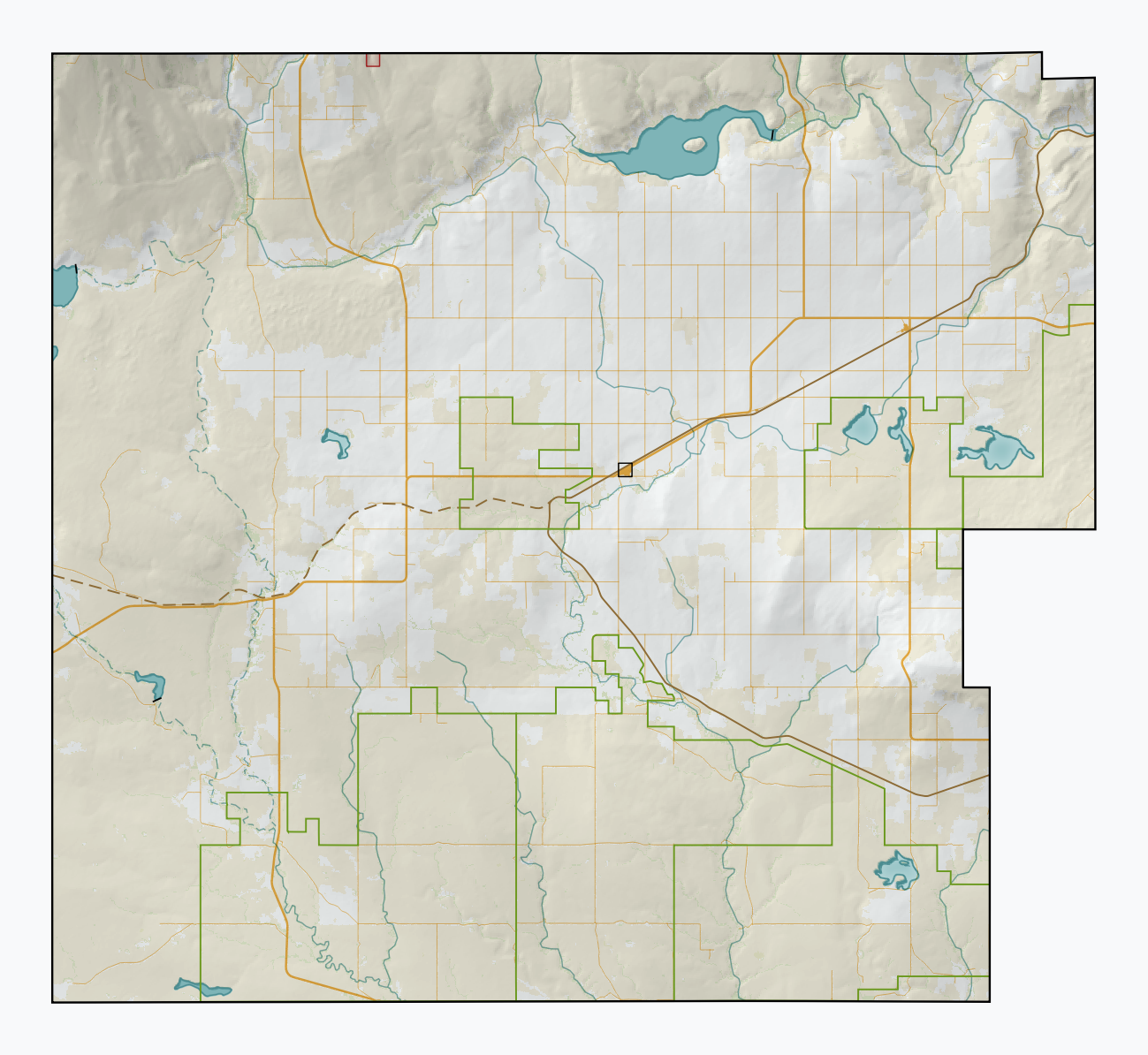
- Location within Reno No. 51 Location within Saskatchewan
- Coordinates: 49.204°N 109.5244°W
- Country: Canada
- Province: Saskatchewan
- Region: Southwest
- Census division: 4
- Rural Municipality: Reno
- Established: N/A
- Incorporated (Village): N/A
- Incorporated (Town): Never

Government
  - Administrator: Kim Lacelle
  - Governing body: Reno No. 51

Population (2006)
  - Total: 0
- Time zone: CST
- Postal code: S0N 2G0
- Area code: 306
- Highways: TWP Rd. 32; Rge Rd. 271
- Waterways: Cypress Lake

Nashlyn is an unincorporated community within the Rural Municipality of Reno No. 51, Saskatchewan, Canada. The former townsite is located 15 kilometres (9.3 mi) west of Highway 18, about 10 kilometres (6.2 mi) south of the village of Consul and Highway 13.

== Education ==
Nashlyn no longer has a school. Those who live in Nashlyn and area are sent to the neighbouring village of Consul which has a school that covers Kindergarten to Grade 12 serving approximately 100 students.

== Climate ==
Nashlyn holds the record for the hottest month ever recorded in Canada with an average daily maximum of 35.8 °C recorded in July 1936.

== See also ==
- List of communities in Saskatchewan
