= South Fork, Saskatchewan =

Community in Saskatchewan, Canada

South Fork Home of Nicholas Herlinger
- Unincorporated community
- Location within Arlington No. 79 Location within Saskatchewan
- Coordinates: 49°25′37″N 108°43′10″W
- Country: Canada
- Province: Saskatchewan
- Region: Southwest Saskatchewan
- Census division: 4
- Rural Municipality: Arlington No. 79
- Post office Founded: 1913
- Incorporated (Village): 1913

Government
  - Governing body: Rural Municipality of Arlington
- Time zone: CST
- Area code: 306
- Highways: Highway 633

South Fork is an unincorporated community within the Rural Municipality of Arlington No. 79, Saskatchewan, Canada in the Cypress Hills along the course of Swift Current Creek.

== History ==
South Fork began in 1913. By 1923 there were three grain elevators, a lumber yard, cafe, blacksmith, pool hall, feed mill, and general store.

A fire in 1928, the depression, and better roads started South Fork on a decline.

The last grain elevator closed in 1974 and moved to a farm south of Dollard.

== See also ==
- List of communities in Saskatchewan
- List of hamlets in Saskatchewan
- Lists of ghost towns in Canada
- List of ghost towns in Saskatchewan
