= Illerbrun =

Illerbrun may refer to:

- Illerbrun, Saskatchewan, unincorporated community in Canada
- Bryan Illerbrun, (1957–2013), Canadian football player
