= Darlings Beach =

Community in Saskatchewan, Canada

- Organized Hamlet
- Location within Saskatchewan Location within Canada
- Coordinates: 49.9828°N 107.9263°W
- Country: Canada
- Province: Saskatchewan
- Region: Southwest
- Census division: 4
- Rural municipality: Lac Pelletier No. 107

Area
  - Land: 0.21 km^{2} (0.081 sq mi)

Population (2016)
  - Total: 0
- Time zone: CST
- Area code: 306
- Highways: Highway 343
- Railways: None

Darlings Beach is a hamlet in Rural Municipality of Lac Pelletier No. 107, Saskatchewan, Canada. Listed as a designated place by Statistics Canada, the hamlet had a population of 0 in the Canada 2011 Census. The hamlet is located on the eastern shore of Lac Pelletier, within the Lac Pelletier Regional Park. It is approximately 48 kilometres (30 mi) south and west of Swift Current, 4.4 kilometres (2.7 mi) south of Highway 343.

== Demographics ==
Canada census – Darlings Beach community profile

	2016	2011
Population	0 (0% from 2011)	0 (-100.0% from 2006)
Land area	0.21 km^{2} (0.081 sq mi)	0.21 km^{2} (0.081 sq mi)
Population density	0.0/km^{2} (0/sq mi)	0.0/km^{2} (0/sq mi)
Median age
Private dwellings	0 (total)	0 (total)
Median household income	$N/A	$N/A

References: 2016 2011

== See also ==
- List of communities in Saskatchewan
- List of hamlets in Saskatchewan
