= Cummings, Saskatchewan =

Community in Saskatchewan, Canada

Cummings
- Unincorporated community
- Location within Saskatchewan Location within Canada
- Coordinates: 50.025°N 109.562°W
- Country: Canada
- Province: Saskatchewan
- Region: Southwest Saskatchewan
- Census division: 4
- Rural Municipality: Maple Creek

Government
  - Reeve: Greg Link
  - Administrator: Barbi-Rose Weisgerber
  - Governing body: Maple Creek No. 111
- Time zone: CST
- Postal code: S0N 1N0
- Area code: 306
- Highways: Trans Canada Highway
- Railway: Canadian Pacific

Cummings is an unincorporated community within the Rural Municipality of Maple Creek No. 111, Saskatchewan, Canada. The community is located on Range road 295, 30 km northwest of Maple Creek.

== Demographics ==
Cummings, like so many smaller communities throughout Saskatchewan, has struggled to maintain a sturdy population causing it to become a ghost town.

== Education ==
Cummings no longer has a school, but those who live in or around Cummings are sent to the neighboring town of Maple Creek which has a school that covers Kindergarten to Grade 12 serving approximately 400 students.

== See also ==
- List of communities in Saskatchewan
- List of ghost towns in Saskatchewan
