= Rural Municipality of Lac Pelletier No. 107 =

Rural municipality in Saskatchewan, Canada

Lac Pelletier No. 107
- Rural municipality
- Rural Municipality of Lac Pelletier No. 107
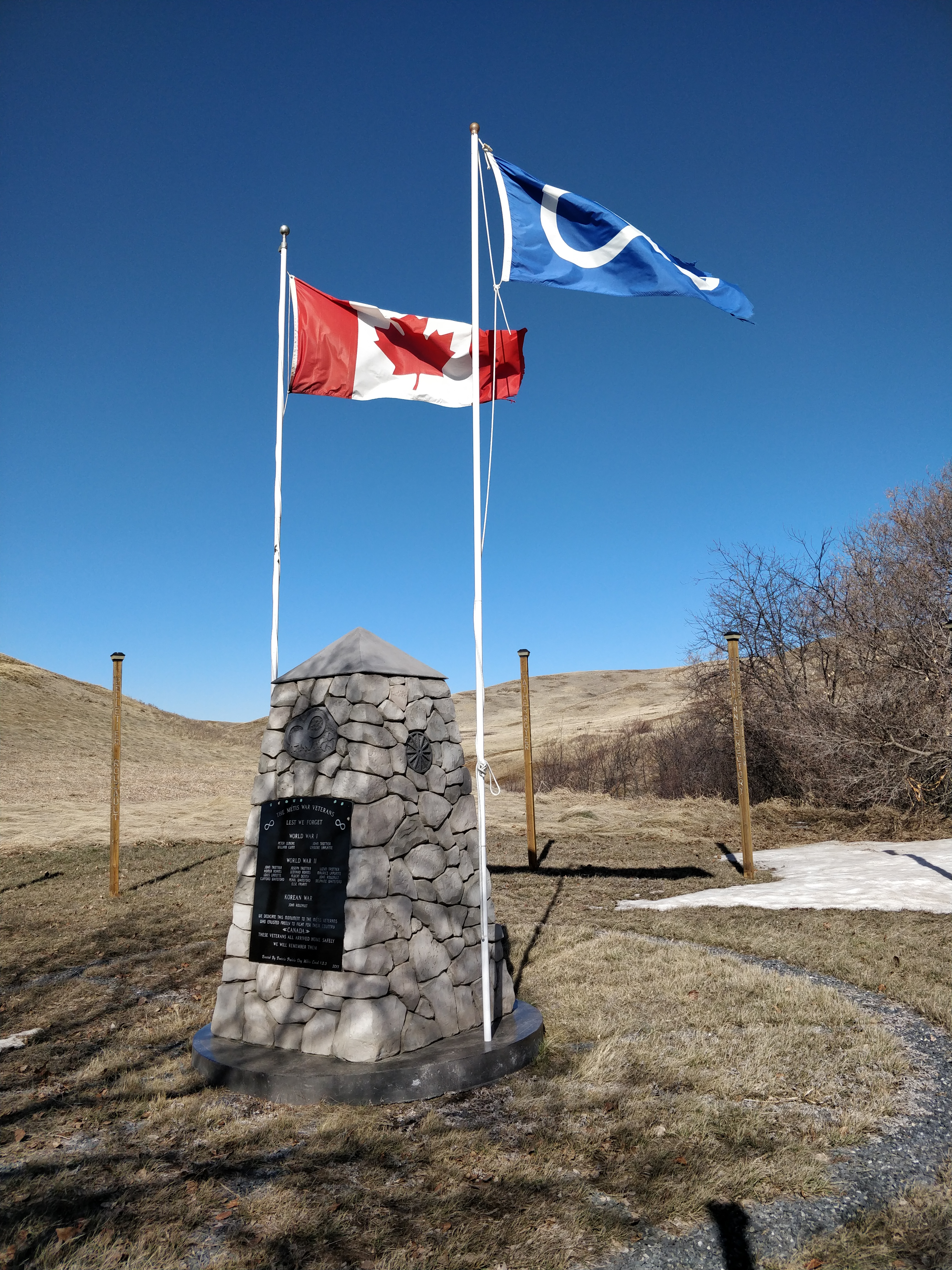
- Métis veterans' cenotaph

- Location of the RM of Lac Pelletier No. 107 in Saskatchewan

- Coordinates: 49.917°N 107.843°W
- Country: Canada
- Province: Saskatchewan
- Census division: 4
- SARM division: 3
- Federal riding: Cypress Hills—Grasslands
- Provincial riding: Wood River
- Formed: January 1, 1913

Government
  - Reeve: Murray Spetz
  - Governing body: RM of Lac Pelletier No. 107 Council
  - Administrator: Sandra Krushelniski
  - Office location: Neville

Area (2016)
  - Land: 849.27 km^{2} (327.90 sq mi)

Population (2016)
  - Total: 546
  - Density: 0.6/km^{2} (1.6/sq mi)
- Time zone: CST
  - Summer (DST): CST
- Postal code: S0N 1T0
- Area codes: 306 and 639

The Rural Municipality of Lac Pelletier No. 107 (2016 population: 546) is a rural municipality (RM) in the Canadian province of Saskatchewan within Census Division No. 4 and SARM Division No. 3. It is located in the southwest portion of the province.

== History ==
The RM of Lac Pelletier No. 107 incorporated as a rural municipality on January 1, 1913.

== Geography ==
=== Communities and localities ===
The following unincorporated communities are within the RM.

Organized hamlets

- Darlings Beach

Localities

- Blumenhof
- Blumenort
- Lac Pelletier
- Neuhoffnung
- Vesper

== Attractions ==
- Lac Pelletier Regional Park

== Demographics ==
Population history (1981–2016)
Year	Pop.	±%
1981	586	—
1986	544	−7.2%
1991	515	−5.3%
1996	498	−3.3%
2001	501	+0.6%
2006	524	+4.6%
2011	607	+15.8%
2016	546	−10.0%
Source: Statistics Canada via Saskatchewan Bureau of Statistics

In the 2021 Census of Population conducted by Statistics Canada, the RM of Lac Pelletier No. 107 had a population of 563 living in 223 of its 466 total private dwellings, a change of 3.1% from its 2016 population of 546. With a land area of 841.37 km^{2} (324.85 sq mi), it had a population density of 0.7/km^{2} (1.7/sq mi) in 2021.

In the 2016 Census of Population, the RM of Lac Pelletier No. 107 recorded a population of 546 living in 180 of its 396 total private dwellings, a −10% change from its 2011 population of 607. With a land area of 849.27 km^{2} (327.90 sq mi), it had a population density of 0.6/km^{2} (1.7/sq mi) in 2016.

== Government ==
The RM of Lac Pelletier No. 107 is governed by an elected municipal council and an appointed administrator that meets on the second Tuesday of every month. The reeve of the RM is Murray Spetz while its administrator is Sandra Krushelniski. The RM's office is located in Neville.

== Transportation ==
- Highway 4
- Highway 43
- Highway 343

== See also ==
- List of rural municipalities in Saskatchewan
