= Rural Municipality of Bone Creek No. 108 =

Rural municipality in Saskatchewan, Canada

Bone Creek No. 108
- Rural municipality
- Rural Municipality of Bone Creek No. 108
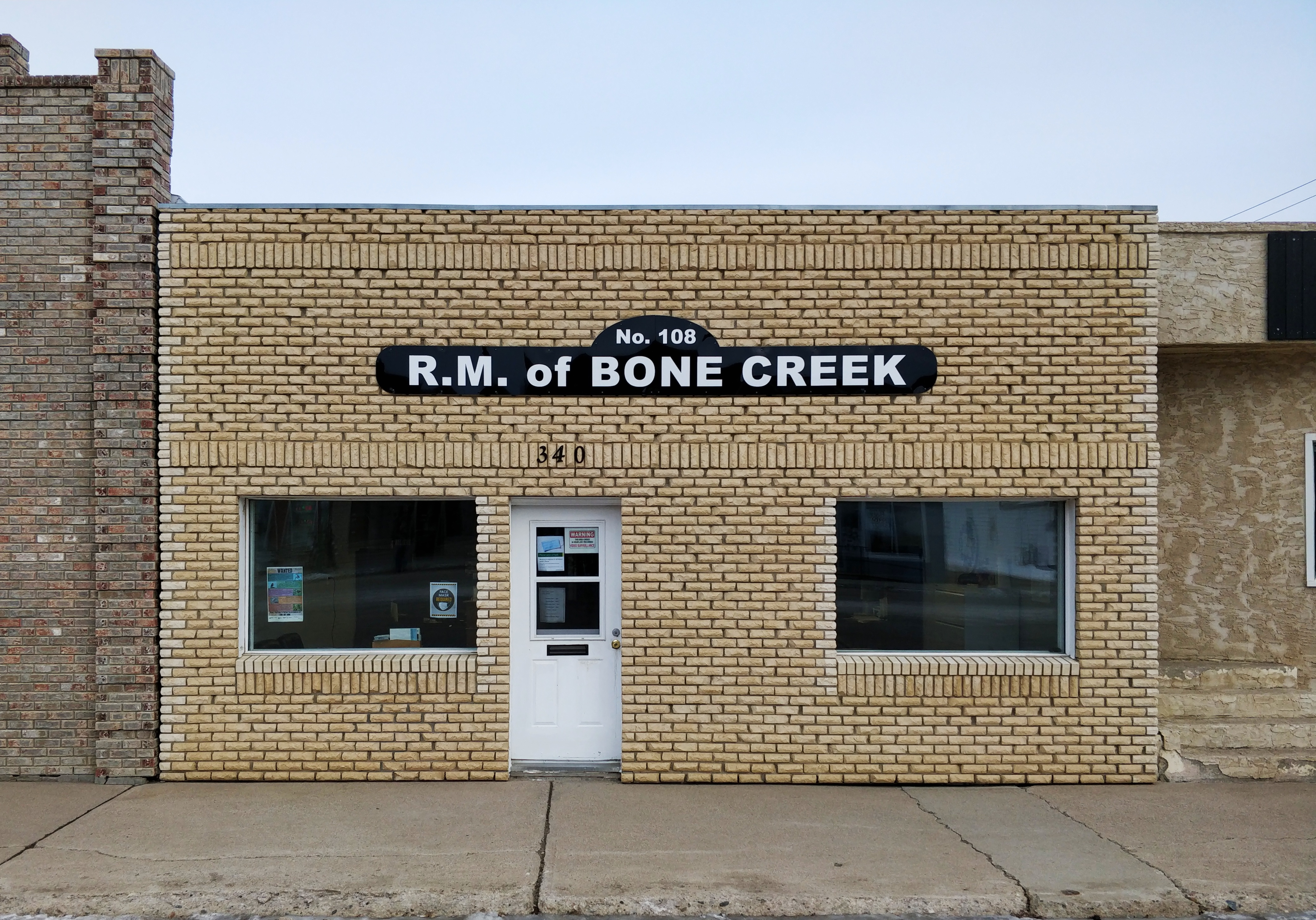
- Administrative office in Shaunavon

- Location of the RM of Bone Creek No. 108 in Saskatchewan
- Coordinates: 49.830°N 108.246°W
- Country: Canada
- Province: Saskatchewan
- Census division: 4
- SARM division: 3
- Federal riding: Cypress Hills—Grasslands
- Provincial riding: Cypress Hills
- Formed: December 11, 1911

Government
  - Reeve: Mel Larson
  - Governing body: RM of Bone Creek No. 108 Council
  - Administrator: Lana Bavle
  - Office location: Shaunavon

Area (2016)
  - Land: 847.16 km^{2} (327.09 sq mi)

Population (2016)
  - Total: 394
  - Density: 0.5/km^{2} (1.3/sq mi)
- Time zone: CST
  - Summer (DST): CST
- Postal code: S0N 2M0
- Area codes: 306 and 639

The Rural Municipality of Bone Creek No. 108 (2016 population: 394) is a rural municipality (RM) in the Canadian province of Saskatchewan within Census Division No. 4 and SARM Division No. 3. It is located in the southwest portion of the province.

== History ==
The RM of Bone Creek No. 108 incorporated as a rural municipality on December 11, 1911.

== Geography ==
=== Communities and localities ===
The following unincorporated communities are located in the RM of Bone Creek No. 108.

Hamlets

- Simmie

Localities

- Illerbrun
- Instow, former seat of municipality, dissolved as a village, December 31, 1953.
- Scotsguard, former seat of municipality, dissolved as a village, December 31, 1951.

== Demographics ==
Population history (1981–2016)
Year	Pop.	±%
1981	533	—
1986	506	−5.1%
1991	435	−14.0%
1996	458	+5.3%
2001	377	−17.7%
2006	321	−14.9%
2011	340	+5.9%
2016	394	+15.9%
Source: Statistics Canada via Saskatchewan Bureau of Statistics

In the 2021 Census of Population conducted by Statistics Canada, the RM of Bone Creek No. 108 had a population of 362 living in 107 of its 150 total private dwellings, a change of −8.1% from its 2016 population of 394. With a land area of 834.81 km^{2} (322.32 sq mi), it had a population density of 0.4/km^{2} (1.1/sq mi) in 2021.

In the 2016 Census of Population, the RM of Bone Creek No. 108 recorded a population of 394 living in 111 of its 128 total private dwellings, a 15.9% change from its 2011 population of 340. With a land area of 847.16 km^{2} (327.09 sq mi), it had a population density of 0.5/km^{2} (1.2/sq mi) in 2016.

== Government ==
The RM of Bone Creek No. 108 is governed by an elected municipal council and an appointed administrator that meets on the second Wednesday of every month. The reeve of the RM is Mel Larson while its administrator is Lana Bavle. The RM's office is located in Shaunavon.

== Transportation ==
Roads

- Highway 13 – serves Instow and Scotsguard
- Highway 631 – serves Scotsguard and Simmie
- Highway 343 – serves Simmie

== See also ==
- List of rural municipalities in Saskatchewan
