= Belanger, Saskatchewan =

Community in Saskatchewan, Canada

Belanger
- Unincorporated community
- Location within Saskatchewan Location within Canada
- Coordinates: 49.342°N 109.184°W
- Country: Canada
- Province: Saskatchewan
- Region: Southwest Saskatchewan
- Census division: 4
- Rural Municipality: Maple Creek
- Established: 1890s

Government
  - Reeve: Greg Link
  - Administrator: Barbi-Rose Weisgerber
  - Governing body: Maple Creek No. 111
- Time zone: CST
- Postal code: S0N 1N0
- Area code: 306
- Highways: 706
- Railway: none

Belanger is an unincorporated community within the Rural Municipality of Maple Creek No. 111, Saskatchewan, Canada. The community is on Highway 706, about 50 kilometres (31 mi) south of Maple Creek.

== See also ==
- List of communities in Saskatchewan
