= Simmie, Saskatchewan =

Community in Saskatchewan, Canada

Simmie
- Hamlet
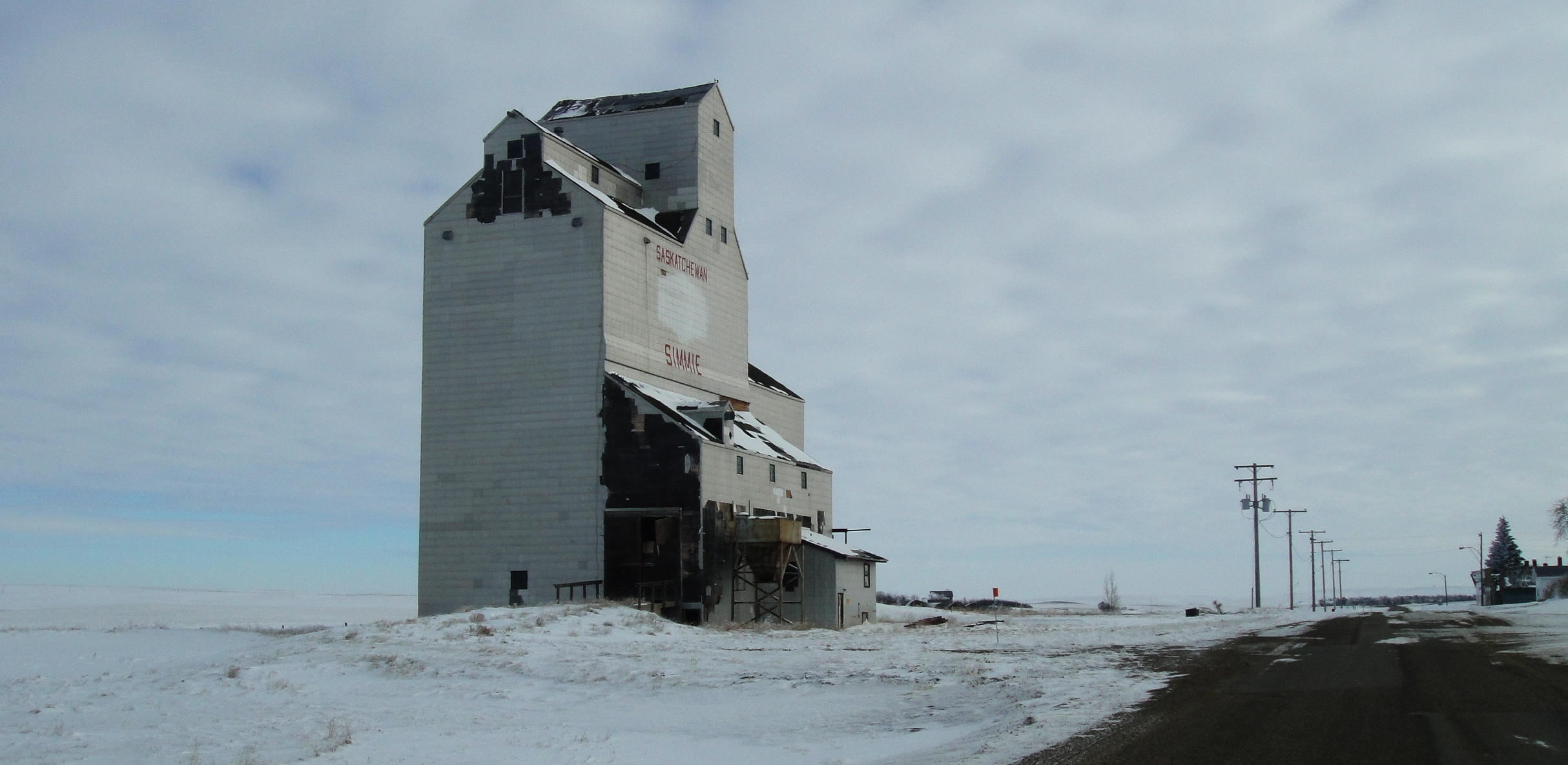
- Grain elevator in Simmie

- Location within Bone Creek No. 108 Location within Saskatchewan
- Coordinates: 49.944°N 108.106°W
- Country: Canada
- Province: Saskatchewan
- Region: Southwest
- Rural municipality: Bone Creek No. 108

Government
  - Governing body: Bone Creek No. 108

Area
  - Land: 0.12 km^{2} (0.046 sq mi)

Population (2016)
  - Total: 41
  - Density: 348/km^{2} (900/sq mi)
- Time zone: CST
- Postal Code: S0N 2M0
- Area code: 306
- Highways: Highway 343 / Highway 631
- Waterways: Reid Lake

Simmie is a hamlet in the Rural Municipality of Bone Creek No. 108, Saskatchewan, Canada. Listed as a designated place by Statistics Canada, the hamlet had a population of 41 in the Canada 2016 Census. The hamlet is located on Highway 343 and Highway 631, about 50 kilometres (31 mi) southwest of Swift Current.

== Demographics ==
In the 2021 Census of Population conducted by Statistics Canada, Simmie had a population of 25 living in 12 of its 18 total private dwellings, a change of −39% from its 2016 population of 41. With a land area of 0.15 km^{2} (0.058 sq mi), it had a population density of 166.7/km^{2} (431.7/sq mi) in 2021.

== See also ==
- List of communities in Saskatchewan
- List of hamlets in Saskatchewan
