= Rural Municipality of Maple Creek No. 111 =

Rural municipality in Saskatchewan, Canada

Maple Creek No. 111
- Rural municipality
- Rural Municipality of Maple Creek No. 111
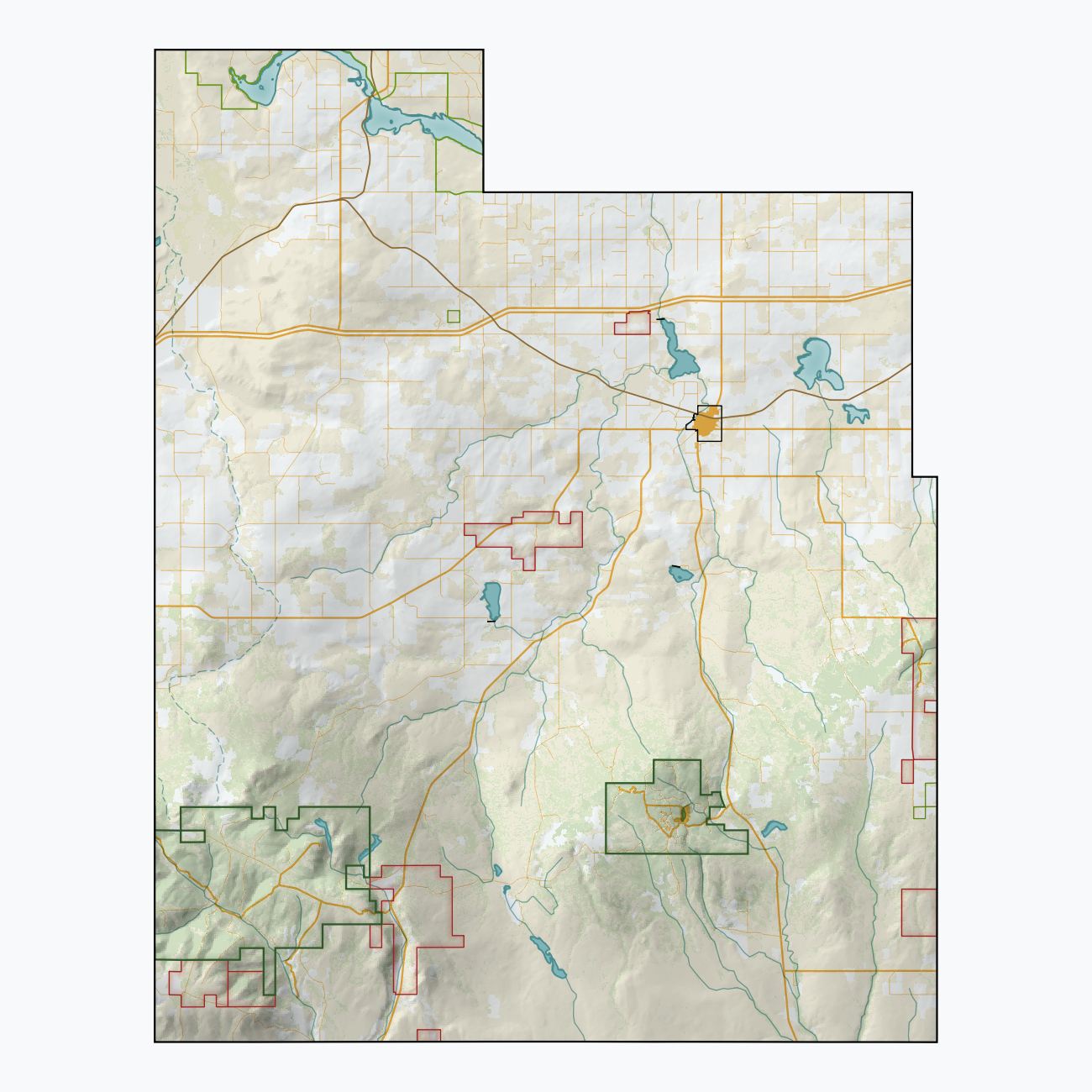

- Location of the RM of Maple Creek No. 111 in Saskatchewan
- Coordinates: 49.702°N 109.637°W
- Country: Canada
- Province: Saskatchewan
- Census division: 4
- SARM division: 3
- Federal riding: Cypress Hills—Grasslands
- Provincial riding: Cypress Hills
- Formed: December 10, 1917

Government
  - Reeve: Elden Jamieson
  - Governing body: RM of Maple Creek No. 111 Council
  - Administrator: Christine Hoffman
  - Office location: Maple Creek

Area (2016)
  - Land: 3,243.33 km^{2} (1,252.26 sq mi)

Population (2016)
  - Total: 1,068
  - Density: 0.3/km^{2} (0.78/sq mi)
- Time zone: CST
  - Summer (DST): CST
- Postal code: S0N 1N0
- Area codes: 306 and 639
- Website: Official website

The Rural Municipality of Maple Creek No. 111 (2016 population: 1,068) is a rural municipality (RM) in the Canadian province of Saskatchewan within Census Division No. 4 and SARM Division No. 3. It is located in the southwest portion of the province.

== History ==
The RM of Maple Creek No. 111 incorporated as a rural municipality on December 10, 1917.

== Geography ==
=== Communities and localities ===
The following urban municipalities are surrounded by the RM.

Towns

- Maple Creek

The following unincorporated communities are within the RM.

Localities

- Belanger
- Cardell
- Clearsite
- Cummings
- Hatton, dissolved as a village, March 15, 1934
- Kincorth
- Mackid

It is adjacent to the Indian reserve of the Nekaneet Cree Nation.

=== Climate ===
Climate data for Maple Creek WMO ID: 71453; coordinates 49°54′09″N 109°27′58″W; elevation: 766.7 m (2,515 ft); 1991–2020 normals, (Note: Precipitation (including rain and snow) and days with precipitation are from the 1981–2010 normals) extremes 1921–present (Note: Extreme high and low temperatures in the table below were recorded at Maple Creek from July 1921 to June 1967, at Maple Creek North from July 1967 to November 2007 and at Maple Creek from December 2007 to present.)
Month	Jan	Feb	Mar	Apr	May	Jun	Jul	Aug	Sep	Oct	Nov	Dec	Year
Record high humidex	18.3	18.4	22.7	29.5	33.8	41.0	40.6	39.9	35.1	29.3	23.5	15.9	41.0
Record high °C (°F)	18.4 (65.1)	18.9 (66.0)	22.8 (73.0)	29.5 (85.1)	32.2 (90.0)	35.9 (96.6)	38.8 (101.8)	43.3 (109.9)	35.2 (95.4)	28.7 (83.7)	23.9 (75.0)	16.0 (60.8)	43.3 (109.9)
Mean daily maximum °C (°F)	−1.8 (28.8)	−0.8 (30.6)	5.2 (41.4)	12.5 (54.5)	18.1 (64.6)	22.1 (71.8)	27.1 (80.8)	26.5 (79.7)	20.6 (69.1)	12.6 (54.7)	4.7 (40.5)	−1.0 (30.2)	12.2 (54.0)
Daily mean °C (°F)	−8.3 (17.1)	−7.3 (18.9)	−1.2 (29.8)	5.3 (41.5)	10.8 (51.4)	15.2 (59.4)	19.2 (66.6)	18.3 (64.9)	13.0 (55.4)	5.7 (42.3)	−1.7 (28.9)	−7.3 (18.9)	5.1 (41.2)
Mean daily minimum °C (°F)	−14.8 (5.4)	−13.8 (7.2)	−7.6 (18.3)	−1.9 (28.6)	3.3 (37.9)	8.2 (46.8)	11.2 (52.2)	10.1 (50.2)	5.2 (41.4)	−1.3 (29.7)	−8.0 (17.6)	−13.5 (7.7)	−1.9 (28.6)
Record low °C (°F)	−40.4 (−40.7)	−46.7 (−52.1)	−36.1 (−33.0)	−19.0 (−2.2)	−11.1 (12.0)	−3.5 (25.7)	2.2 (36.0)	−1.9 (28.6)	−7.0 (19.4)	−20.2 (−4.4)	−33.9 (−29.0)	−40.8 (−41.4)	−46.7 (−52.1)
Record low wind chill	−46.5	−51.8	−42.9	−25.3	−14.1	−3.5	0.0	−4.8	−10.4	−26.3	−38.8	−48.0	−51.8
Average precipitation mm (inches)	18.1 (0.71)	13.1 (0.52)	22.2 (0.87)	25.0 (0.98)	47.1 (1.85)	76.5 (3.01)	45.9 (1.81)	43.4 (1.71)	36.3 (1.43)	23.9 (0.94)	19.0 (0.75)	17.6 (0.69)	388.1 (15.28)
Average rainfall mm (inches)	1.4 (0.06)	0.7 (0.03)	5.7 (0.22)	18.4 (0.72)	41.8 (1.65)	76.5 (3.01)	45.9 (1.81)	43.0 (1.69)	34.9 (1.37)	16.0 (0.63)	2.6 (0.10)	0.9 (0.04)	287.6 (11.32)
Average snowfall cm (inches)	16.7 (6.6)	12.3 (4.8)	16.6 (6.5)	6.6 (2.6)	5.4 (2.1)	0.0 (0.0)	0.0 (0.0)	0.4 (0.2)	1.5 (0.6)	7.9 (3.1)	16.4 (6.5)	16.7 (6.6)	100.5 (39.6)
Average precipitation days (≥ 0.2 mm)	7.2	6.2	7.9	7.1	11.3	13.0	9.3	9.0	9.0	6.8	6.8	8.4	102.0
Average rainy days (≥ 0.2 mm)	0.7	0.46	2.4	5.5	11	13	9.3	9.0	8.9	5.3	1.7	0.77	67.9
Average snowy days (≥ 0.2 cm)	6.8	5.8	6.0	2.3	1.2	0.0	0.0	0.07	0.59	2.0	5.5	7.8	38.0
Average relative humidity (%) (at 1500 LST)	67.8	65.1	56.0	44.2	44.3	49.1	39.1	37.4	42.0	49.0	60.4	67.5	51.8
Source: Environment and Climate Change Canada (precipitation) (February minimum) (August maximum)

== Demographics ==
Population history (1981–2016)
Year	Pop.	±%
1981	1,337	—
1986	1,276	−4.6%
1991	1,213	−4.9%
1996	1,193	−1.6%
2001	1,156	−3.1%
2006	1,167	+1.0%
2011	1,154	−1.1%
2016	1,068	−7.5%
2021	1,167	+9.3%
Source: Statistics Canada via Saskatchewan Bureau of Statistics

In the 2021 Census of Population conducted by Statistics Canada, the RM of Maple Creek No. 111 had a population of 1,167 living in 341 of its 571 total private dwellings, a change of 9.8% from its 2016 population of 1,063. With a land area of 3,180.1 km^{2} (1,227.8 sq mi), it had a population density of 0.4/km^{2} (1.0/sq mi) in 2021.

In the 2016 Census of Population, the RM of Maple Creek No. 111 recorded a population of 1,068 living in 320 of its 538 total private dwellings, a −7.5% change from its 2011 population of 1,154. With a land area of 3,243.33 km^{2} (1,252.26 sq mi), it had a population density of 0.3/km^{2} (0.9/sq mi) in 2016.

== Economy ==
Its main industry is ranching.

== Government ==
The RM of Maple Creek No. 111 is governed by an elected municipal council and an appointed administrator that meets on the second Thursday of every month. The reeve of the RM is Walter Ehret while its administrator is Christine Hoffman. The RM's office is located in Maple Creek.
