= Illerbrun, Saskatchewan =

Community in Saskatchewan, Canada

Illerbrun
- Unincorporated community
- Location of Illerbrun in Saskatchewan
- Coordinates: 49°56′00″N 108°21′03″W
- Country: Canada
- Province: Saskatchewan
- Region: Southwest Saskatchewan
- Census division: 4
- Rural Municipality: Bone Creek No. 108

Government
  - Governing body: Bone Creek No. 108
- Time zone: UTC−06:00 (CST)
- Postal code: S0N 2M0
- Area code: 306

Illerbrun is an unincorporated community within the Rural Municipality of Bone Creek No. 108, Saskatchewan, Canada. Located approximately 10 km east of Highway 37, 92.5 km southwest of Swift Current.

== See also ==
- List of communities in Saskatchewan
