= Rural Municipality of Arlington No. 79 =

Rural municipality in Saskatchewan, Canada

Arlington No. 79
- Rural municipality
- Rural Municipality of Arlington No. 79
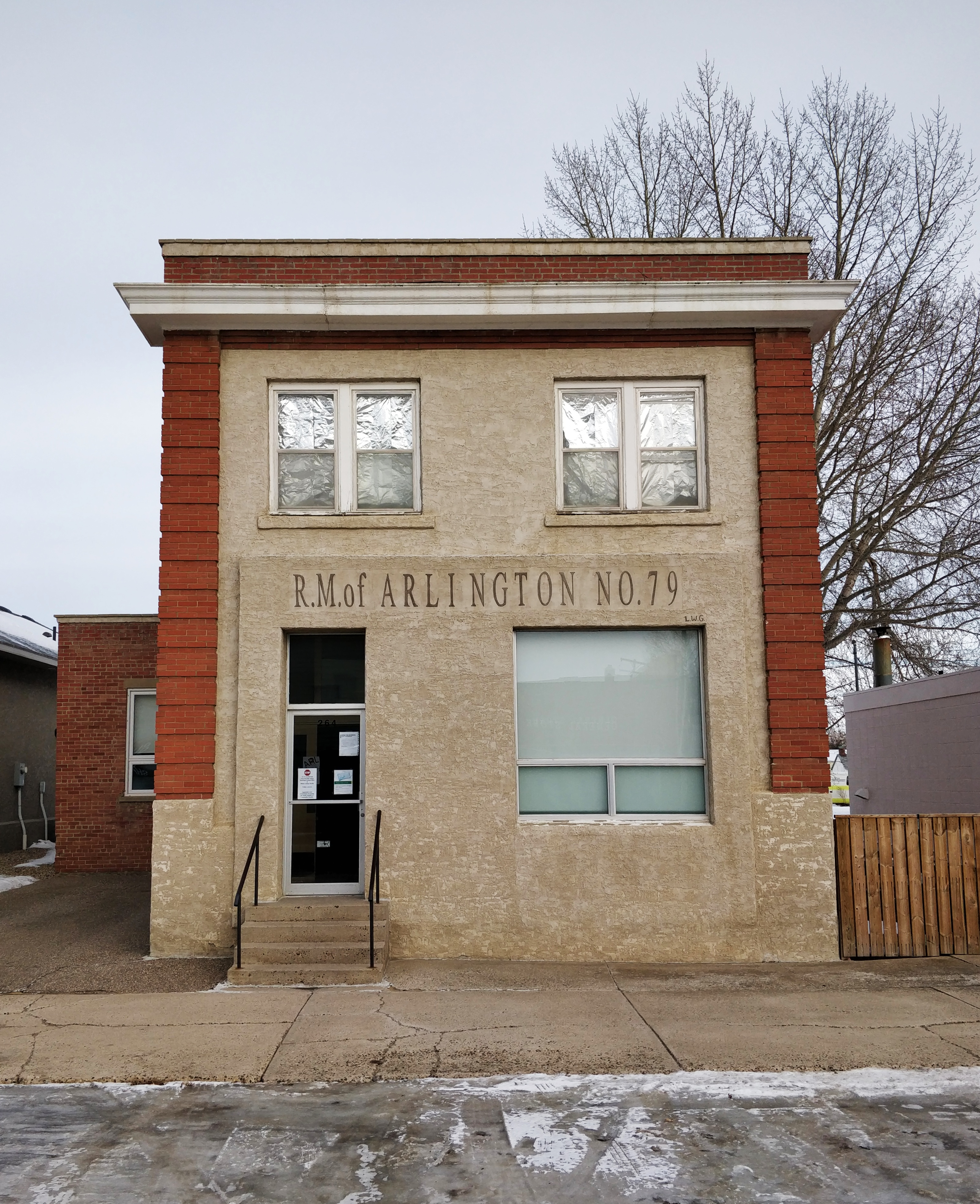
- Administrative office in Shaunavon

- Location of the RM of Arlington No. 79 in Saskatchewan
- Coordinates: 49.624°N 108.659°W
- Country: Canada
- Province: Saskatchewan
- Census division: 4
- SARM division: 3
- Federal riding: Cypress Hills—Grasslands
- Provincial riding: Cypress Hills
- Formed: January 1, 1913

Government
  - Reeve: Donald Lundberg
  - Governing body: RM of Arlington No. 79 Council
  - Administrator: Shelley Rhodes
  - Office location: Shaunavon

Area (2016)
  - Land: 846.79 km^{2} (326.95 sq mi)

Population (2016)
  - Total: 366
  - Density: 0.4/km^{2} (1.0/sq mi)
- Time zone: CST
  - Summer (DST): CST
- Postal code: S0N 2M0
- Area codes: 306 and 639
- Highway(s): Highway 13; Highway 613; Highway 633; Highway 724
- Waterway(s): Lawrence Lake; Jones Creek; Swift Current Creek; Eastend Coulee; Rock Creek

The Rural Municipality of Arlington No. 79 (2016 population: 366) is a rural municipality (RM) in the Canadian province of Saskatchewan within Census Division No. 4 and SARM Division No. 3. It is located in the southwestern region of the province east of Shaunavon.

== History ==
The RM of Arlington No. 79 incorporated as a rural municipality on January 1, 1913.

== Geography ==
=== Communities and localities ===
The following unincorporated communities are within the RM.

Localities

- Dollard
- South Fork

== Pine Cree Regional Park ==
Pine Cree Regional Park (49.6122°N 108.7546°W) is a park in the RM, just north of the Highway 13 and 633 junction between Shaunavon and Eastend.

The park was officially founded as a regional park in 1970 as a small natural environment park. Prior to being a regional park, Everett Baker began developing the area in the 1950s as a place for people to go to appreciate nature. The formation of the park was to commemorate Everett Baker and Irish-Canadian naturalist John Macoun, with the Geological Survey of Canada. John Macoun had camped extensively in the area in the 1880s.

The park is situated alongside Swift Current Creek and features 27 campsites, a picnic area, hiking, a camp kitchen, and wildlife viewing.

== Demographics ==
Population history (1981–2016)
Year	Pop.	±%
1981	432	—
1986	428	−0.9%
1991	351	−18.0%
1996	335	−4.6%
2001	336	+0.3%
2006	413	+22.9%
2011	345	−16.5%
2016	366	+6.1%
Source: Statistics Canada via Saskatchewan Bureau of Statistics

In the 2021 Census of Population conducted by Statistics Canada, the RM of Arlington No. 79 had a population of 359 living in 87 of its 99 total private dwellings, a change of −1.9% from its 2016 population of 366. With a land area of 841.62 km^{2} (324.95 sq mi), it had a population density of 0.4/km^{2} (1.1/sq mi) in 2021.

In the 2016 Census of Population, the RM of Arlington No. 79 recorded a population of 366 living in 84 of its 97 total private dwellings, a 6.1% change from its 2011 population of 345. With a land area of 846.79 km^{2} (326.95 sq mi), it had a population density of 0.4/km^{2} (1.1/sq mi) in 2016.

== Government ==
The RM of Arlington No. 79 is governed by an elected municipal council and an appointed administrator that meets on the second Wednesday of every month. The reeve of the RM is Donald Lundberg while its administrator is Richard Goulet. The RM's office is located in Shaunavon.

== Transportation ==
Highway	Starting point	Communities	Ending point
Highway 13	Alberta Highway 501	Dollard	Manitoba Highway 3
Highway 613	Highway 724	Dollard	Highway 18
Highway 633	Tompkins	South Fork	Saskatchewan Highway 13
Highway 724	Highway 614		Highway 37

== See also ==
- List of rural municipalities in Saskatchewan
