= Dollard, Saskatchewan =

Community in Saskatchewan

Dollard
- Unincorporated community
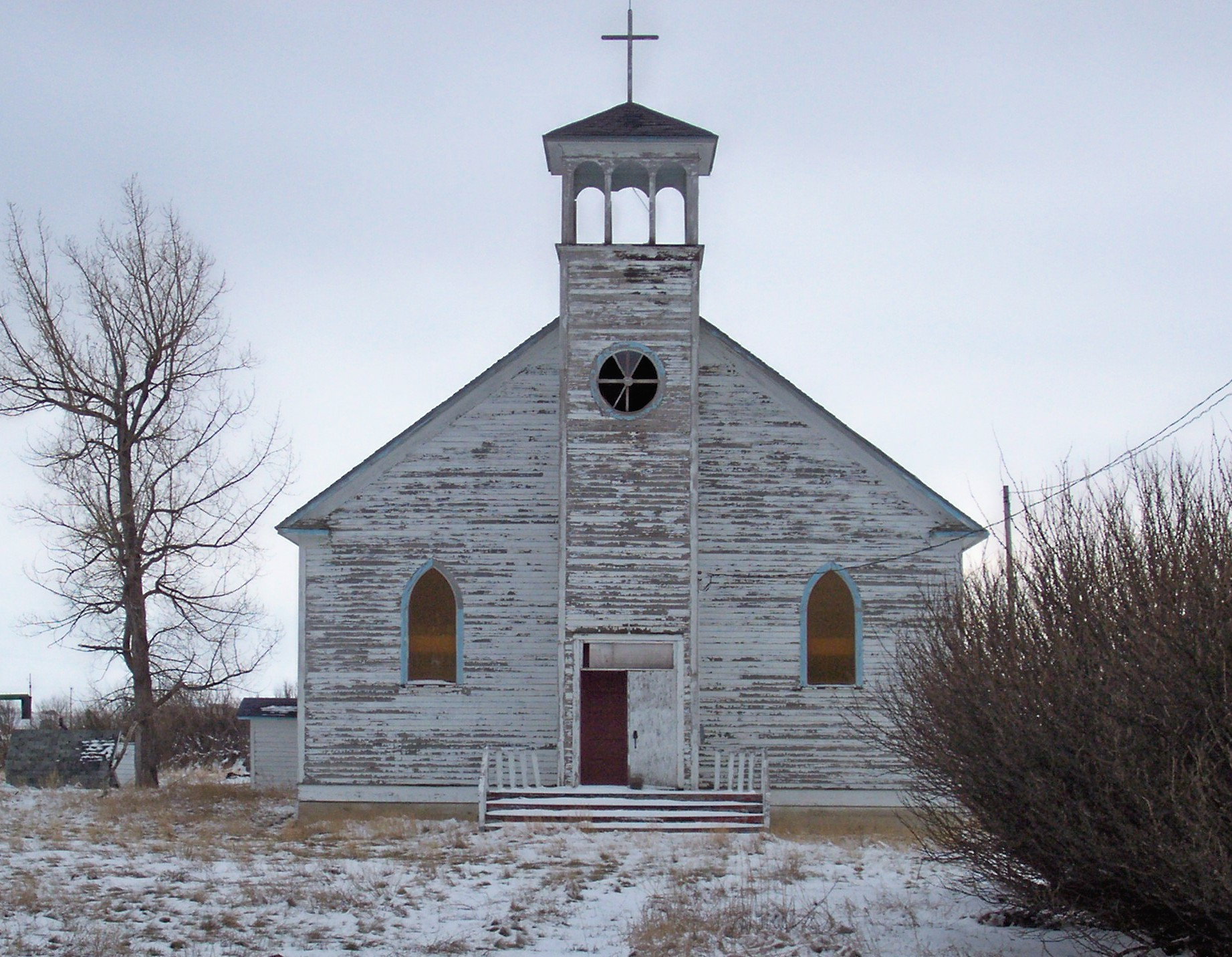
- Sainte-Jeanne d'Arc Roman Catholic Church

- Location within Arlington No. 79 Location within Saskatchewan
- Coordinates: 49.61563°N 108.58612°W
- Country: Canada
- Province: Saskatchewan
- Region: Saskatchewan
- Census division: 4
- Rural Municipality: Arlington No. 79
- Post office Founded: 1909
- Village established: 1910

Area
  - Total: 0.63 km^{2} (0.24 sq mi)

Population (2001)
  - Total: 35
  - Density: 55.4/km^{2} (143/sq mi)
- Time zone: CST
- Area code: 306
- Highways: Highway 13 (Red Coat Trail / Ghost Town Trail) / Highway 613
- Industries: Agriculture; Oil; Trucking

Dollard is an unincorporated community, within the Rural Municipality of Arlington No. 79, Saskatchewan, Canada. The community is situated on the historic Red Coat Trail in the southwest corner of the province, 13 km west of the town of Shaunavon and 21 km east of the town of Eastend.

== History ==
By 1908 enough French speaking settlers had arrived in the region to establish a community which they named Valroy (Val Roy). The name was later changed to Dollard. The name Dollard was chosen by Father Louis-Pierre Gravel (the founder of Gravelbourg) to honour the memory of a hero of New France, Adam Dollard, Sieur des Ormeaux. Father Onésime J. Rioux was the Catholic priest of the parish from 15 December 1918 to 25 November 1940.

A post office was established in 1909 and in 1911 the church of Sainte-Jeanne d'Arc (Joan of Arc) was built. A store soon followed and then a school in 1912.

The post office closed in 1988.

== Demographics ==
In the 2021 Census of Population conducted by Statistics Canada, Dollard had a population of 20 living in 11 of its 14 total private dwellings, a change of 300% from its 2016 population of 5. With a land area of 0.56 km^{2} (0.22 sq mi), it had a population density of 35.7/km^{2} (92.5/sq mi) in 2021.

== See also ==
- List of communities in Saskatchewan
