= Hatton, Saskatchewan =

Community in Saskatchewan, Canada

Hatton
- Unincorporated community
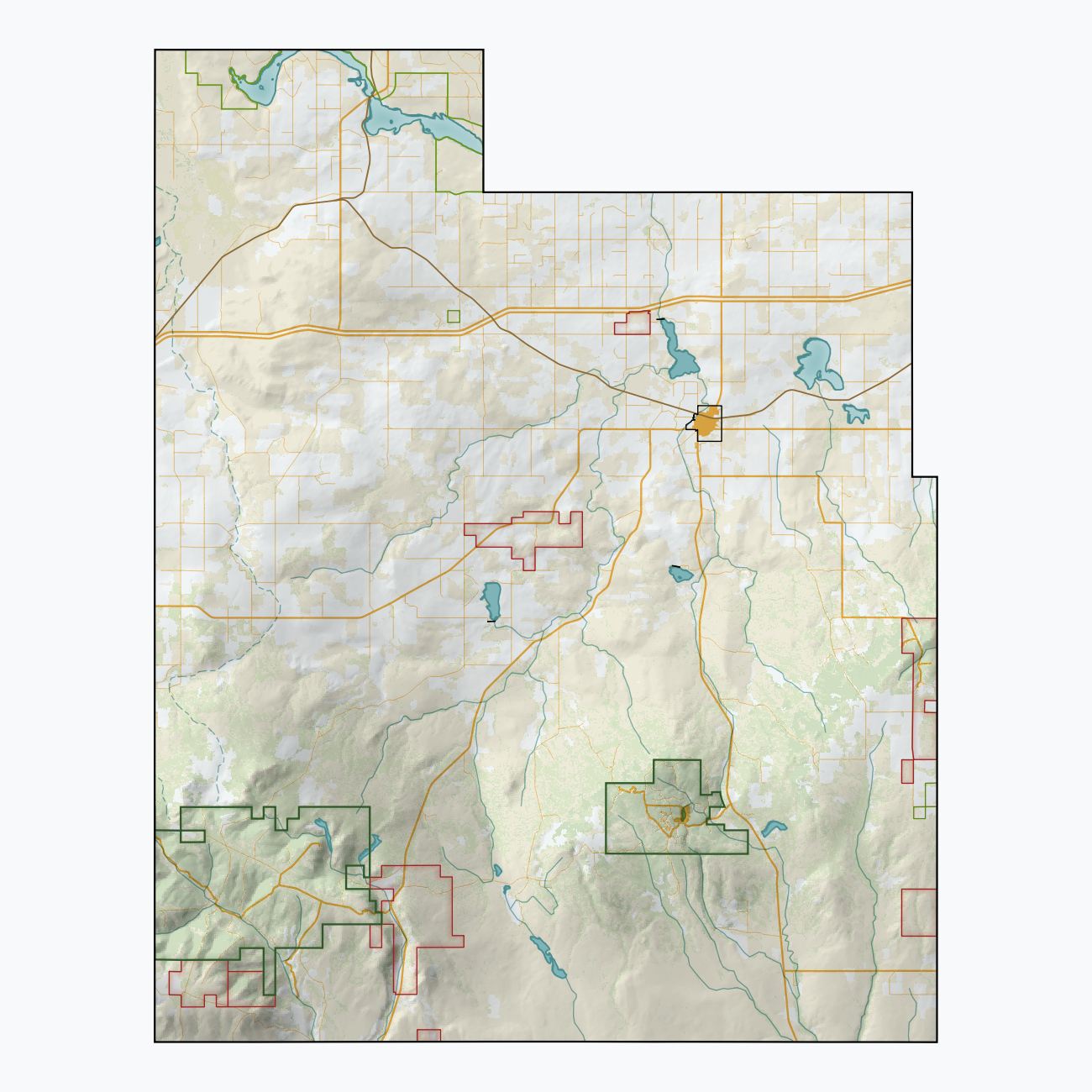
- Location within Maple Creek No. 111 Location within Saskatchewan
- Coordinates: 50.0464°N 109.8276°W
- Country: Canada
- Province: Saskatchewan
- Region: Southwest Saskatchewan
- Rural Municipality: Maple Creek No. 111
- Established: 1910
- Incorporated (Village): 1913
- Incorporated (Town): 1920
- Dissolved: 1930s-40s

Government
  - Reeve: Greg Link
  - Administrator: Barbi-Rose Weisgerber
  - Governing body: Maple Creek No. 111
  - MLA: Doug Steele
  - MP: Jeremy Patzer

Population (2006)
  - Total: 1
- Time zone: CST
- Postal code: S0N 1N0
- Area code: 306
- Highways: Trans Canada Highway; Highway 635
- Railway: Canadian Pacific

Hatton, also known as Forres, is an unincorporated community in Rural Municipality of Maple Creek No. 111, Saskatchewan, Canada. The community is located on Highway 635, 10 km north of the Trans Canada Highway, and 20 km northwest of Maple Creek. Not much is left of the once prosperous town of 800 citizens, but an old pioneer cemetery and schoolhouse that is now a private residence.

== History ==
Hatton, like so many smaller communities throughout Saskatchewan, has struggled to maintain a sturdy population causing it to become a complete ghost town. Around 1913, Hatton had enough citizens to incorporate into a village. By 1920, the population grew large enough to be incorporated as a town. The Great Depression years and the bypass of the Trans Canada Highway caused a decline in Hatton's population, causing the town's status to return to village status. Soon after the community lost its village status by dissolving into an unincorporated community under the jurisdiction of the Rural municipality of Maple Creek No. 111.

== Education ==
Hatton no longer has a school, but those who live in or around Hatton are sent to the neighboring town of Maple Creek which has a school that covers Kindergarten to Grade 12 serving approximately 400 students.

== See also ==
- List of communities in Saskatchewan
- List of ghost towns in Saskatchewan
