= Instow, Saskatchewan =

Community in Saskatchewan, Canada

Instow
- Unincorporated community
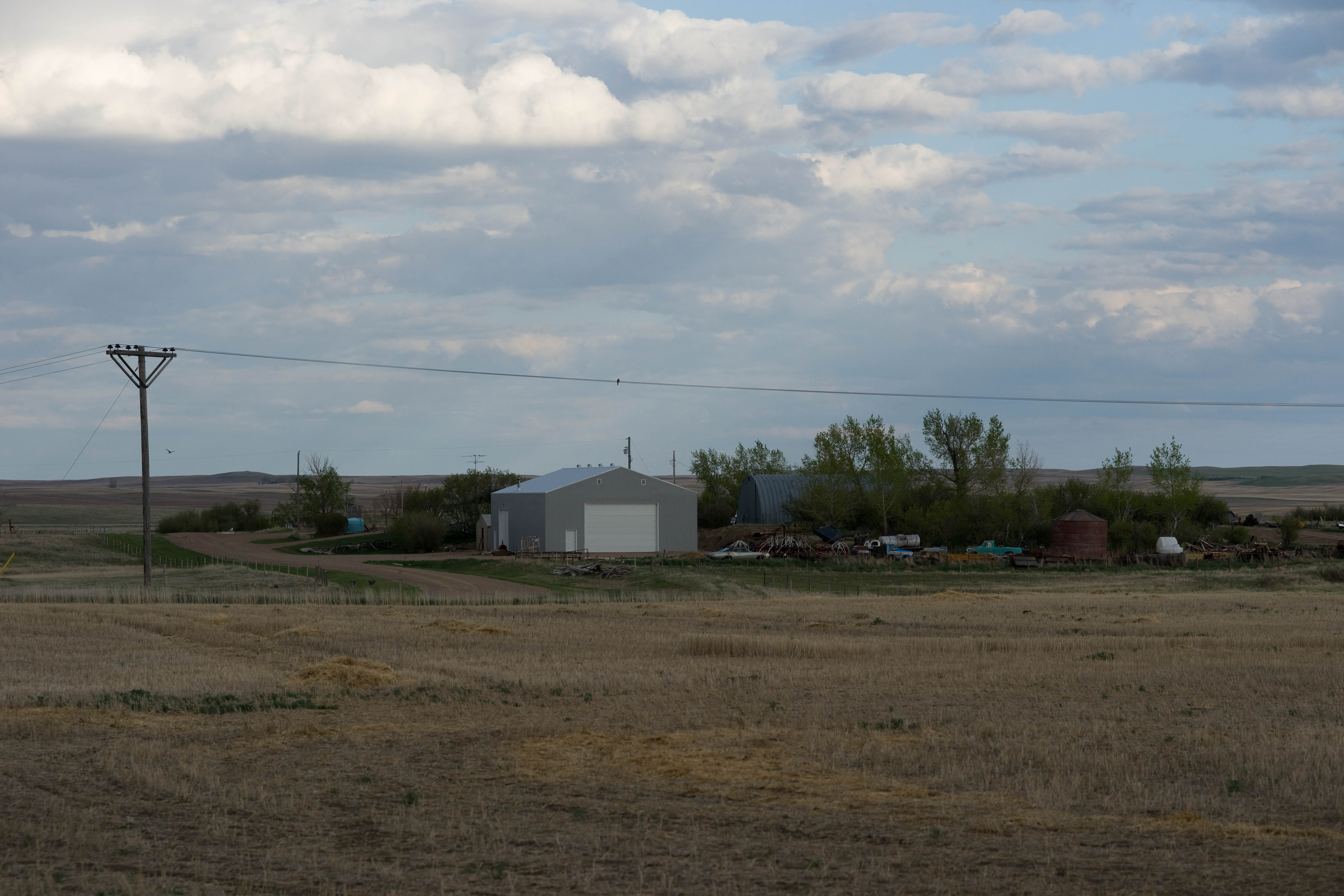

- Location within Saskatchewan Location within Canada
- Coordinates: 49.37402°N 109.27925°W
- Country: Canada
- Province: Saskatchewan
- Region: Southwest
- Rural municipality: Bone Creek No. 108
- Established: 1914
- Incorporated (Village): 1923
- Dissolved: January 1, 1951

Government
  - Governing body: Bone Creek No. 108
  - Reeve: Ben Lewans
  - Administrator: Rhonda Bellefeuille
  - MLA: Doug Steele
  - MP: Jeremy Patzer

Area
  - Total: 0.00 km^{2} (0 sq mi)

Population (2006)
  - Total: 1
  - Density: 0/km^{2} (0/sq mi)
- Time zone: CST
- Postal code: S0N 2M0
- Area code: 306
- Highways: Highway 13 (Red Coat Trail / Ghost Town Trail)
- Railway: Canadian Pacific Railway

Instow is an unincorporated community within the Rural Municipality of Bone Creek No. 108, Saskatchewan, Canada. The community is on Highway 13 also known as the historic Red Coat Trail, about 10 kilometres (6.2 mi) northeast of the town of Shaunavon.

== Demographics ==
Instow, like so many other small farming communities throughout Saskatchewan, has struggled to maintain a sturdy population causing it to become a complete ghost town with few to no residents. Prior to January 1, 2002, Instow was incorporated under village status, but was dissolved into an unincorporated community under the jurisdiction of the Rural Municipality of Bone Creek No. 108 on that date.

In 2006, Instow had a population of 1 living in 1 dwellings, a 0% decrease from 2001. The village had a land area of 0 km^{2} (0 sq mi) and a population density of 0/km^{2} (0/sq mi).

== History ==
=== Early years ===
Instow was once a small community founded in 1914 with the building of the Canadian Pacific Railway. C. Herbert, the first post master and founder of the small community, decided to name it after the small town of Instow, England, where he was originally from. During Instow's boom years in 1923 the town grew to a peak of 60 citizens and was incorporated to village status. After incorporation, streetlights were installed throughout the village, and a well, sidewalks, a skating rink, a seven-metre snow slide for winter sports and a ball diamond were built. The village even had a its very own fire engine, two general stores, a restaurant, a bank, a livery barn, a lumberyard, a community hall, an implement agency, a post office, a garage, a telephone office, a blacksmith, a pool hall, and a total of five grain elevators.

=== Decline ===
In 1951 Instow's Village Council decided it would be best for the village to dissolve into an unincorporated community due to the rapid decline in its population. The community was struck once again with the closure of the post office in 1963. Over time many of the buildings in Instow have either been moved, demolished or simply rotted away, leaving very little to nothing of the community remaining.

== See also ==
- List of communities in Saskatchewan
- List of ghost towns in Saskatchewan
