= Ferguson Bay, Saskatchewan =

Community in Saskatchewan, Canada

Coordinates: 50.000°N 108.070°W

Location of Ferguson Bay in Saskatchewan

Ferguson Bay is a hamlet located within the Rural Municipality of Webb No. 138 in the Canadian province of Saskatchewan. It is located at the southern shore of Ferguson Bay of Reid Lake. The community and the bay are named after Thomas L. Ferguson, a former district sheriff. The community is made up of mostly cabins managed by the Duncairn Cabin Owners Association. Access is from Highway 631.

== See also ==
- List of communities in Saskatchewan
