= Blumenhof =

Community in Saskatchewan, Canada

Coordinates: 50°01′07″N 107°42′08″W

Location of Blumenhof in Saskatchewan

Blumenhof is an unincorporated community within the Rural Municipality of Lac Pelletier No. 107, Saskatchewan, Canada. It is accessed from Highway 4.

== See also ==
- List of communities in Saskatchewan
