= Nekaneet Reserve =

Coordinates: 49°41′23″N 109°26′35″W

- Indian reserve
- Nekaneet Cree Nation Reserve
- Location in Saskatchewan
- First Nation: Nekaneet
- Country: Canada
- Province: Saskatchewan

Area
  - Total: 12,319.9 ha (30,443 acres)

Population (2016)
  - Total: 182
  - Density: 1.48/km^{2} (3.83/sq mi)
- Community Well-Being Index: 58

The Nekaneet Reserve is an Indian reserve of the Nekaneet Cree Nation in Saskatchewan. It is 121 kilometres southwest of Swift Current. In the 2016 Canadian Census, it recorded a population of 182 living in 46 of its 62 total private dwellings. In the same year, its Community Well-Being index was calculated at 58 of 100, compared to 58.4 for the average First Nations community and 77.5 for the average non-Indigenous community.
