= Reid Lake =

Lake in Saskatchewan, Canada

- Duncairn Reservoir
- Location in Saskatchewan Reid Lake (Canada)
- Location: RM of Webb No. 138, Saskatchewan
- Coordinates: 50.0271°N 108.1175°W
- Type: Reservoir
- Part of: Saskatchewan River drainage basin
- Primary inflows: Swift Current Creek
- Primary outflows: Swift Current Creek
- Basin countries: Canada
- Managing agency: Saskatchewan Water Security Agency
- Surface area: 1,430.2 ha (3,534 acres)
- Max. depth: 10.4 m (34 ft)
- Water volume: 105,000 dam^{3} (85,000 acre⋅ft)
- Shore length^{1}: 60 km (37 mi)
- Surface elevation: 823 m (2,700 ft)
- ^{1} Shore length is not a well-defined measure.

Reid Lake, also known as Duncairn Reservoir, is a man-made reservoir in the Canadian Province of Saskatchewan. Reid Lake was formed with the construction of the Duncairn Dam in a glacial meltwater channel along the course of Swift Current Creek in 1942. The reservoir was originally built to supply water for the city of Swift Current, for irrigation projects, and to regulate Swift Current Creek levels downstream. The entire lake is part of the Duncairn Reservoir Migratory Bird Sanctuary.

Reid Lake is Y-shaped and Swift Current Creek flows into Ferguson Bay at the southern end of the "Y". It flows out at Duncairn Dam at the north-eastern "Y" corner. Ferguson Bay is named after Thomas L. Ferguson, a former district sheriff. From the dam, Swift Current Creek carries on northward past the city of Swift Current and into Lake Diefenbaker of the South Saskatchewan River.

== Duncairn Dam ==
Duncairn Dam (50.0743°N 108.0462°W) was constructed in 1942 by the Prairie Farm Rehabilitation Administration (PFRA) to supply water for the Rush Lake, Waldeck, and Herbert irrigation projects. The dam and reservoir are now owned and managed by the Saskatchewan Water Security Agency. Located at the north-eastern part of the lake in the RM of Swift Current No. 137, it is 19 m (62 ft) high and 610 m (2,000 ft) long. At full supply, the reservoir holds 105,000 dam^{3} (85,000 acre⋅ft) of water. The reservoir supplies water to 147 irrigators that irrigate about 3,440 ha (8,500 acres) of land. The community of Duncairn is about 1.5 km (0.93 mi) east of the dam and access to the dam and the community is from a gravel road off Highway 630.

=== Spillway ===
The original spillway was a flip bucket shoot. By 1946, it had already shown signs of spalling. In 1952, severe flooding destroyed the spilling basin and chute. The spillway was redesigned and rebuilt "provide a mass concrete chute section and hydraulic jump stilling basin to contain the extreme runoff flows anticipated." The rebuild was completed in 1953. The spillway remained unchanged until repairs were made due to concrete deterioration of the breastwall. Between 2002 and 2006, upgrades were done to the spillway that included a stilling basin rehab, crest rehab, and the installation of radial gates and stoplogs.

== Duncairn Reservoir (MBS) ==
The Duncairn Reservoir Migratory Bird Sanctuary (MBS) encompasses the entirety of Reid Lake and is in the semi-arid region known as Palliser's Triangle. The area is susceptible to droughts and the stable lake levels provide reliable habitat for migrating birds. Duncairn MBS was one of five migratory bird sanctuaries created in 1948 in Saskatchewan.

Reid Lake lacks islands, which restricts the number of colonial-nesting water birds, and its steep sides limit the amount of riparian habitat. Due to these constraints, birds use it only as a stop-over on their migration. Tundra swans, ducks, and geese are birds that commonly use the reservoir on their migration. Other species found at the lake include the barn swallow, common nighthawk, western grebe, and northern leopard frog.

== Communities ==
There are three communities along the lake's shore. At the southern end of the lake on Ferguson Bay is Ferguson Bay Resort. About 5 km (3.1 mi) north of that on the eastern shore of Ferguson Bay is Sunridge Resort. Rock Ridge Resort is located on the northern shore of the western arm. Access to the communities is from Highways 631 and 343.

== Fish species ==
Fish species commonly found in Reid Lake include walleye, yellow perch, and northern pike. There are four boat launches located around the lake for access.

== See also ==
- List of lakes of Saskatchewan
- Tourism in Saskatchewan
- List of protected areas of Saskatchewan
- List of dams and reservoirs in Canada
