= Swift Current Creek =

River in Saskatchewan, Canada

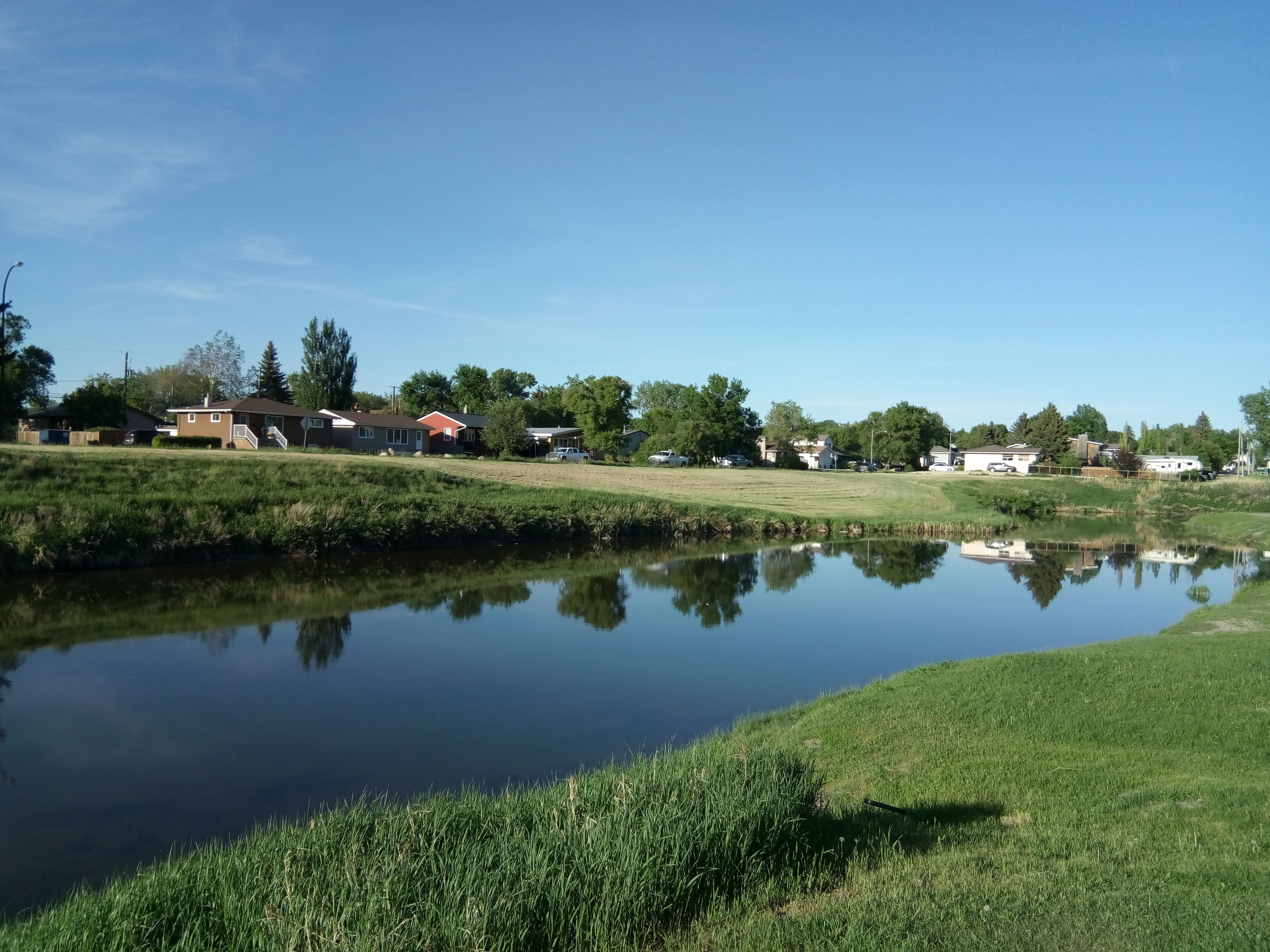
- Swift Current Creek

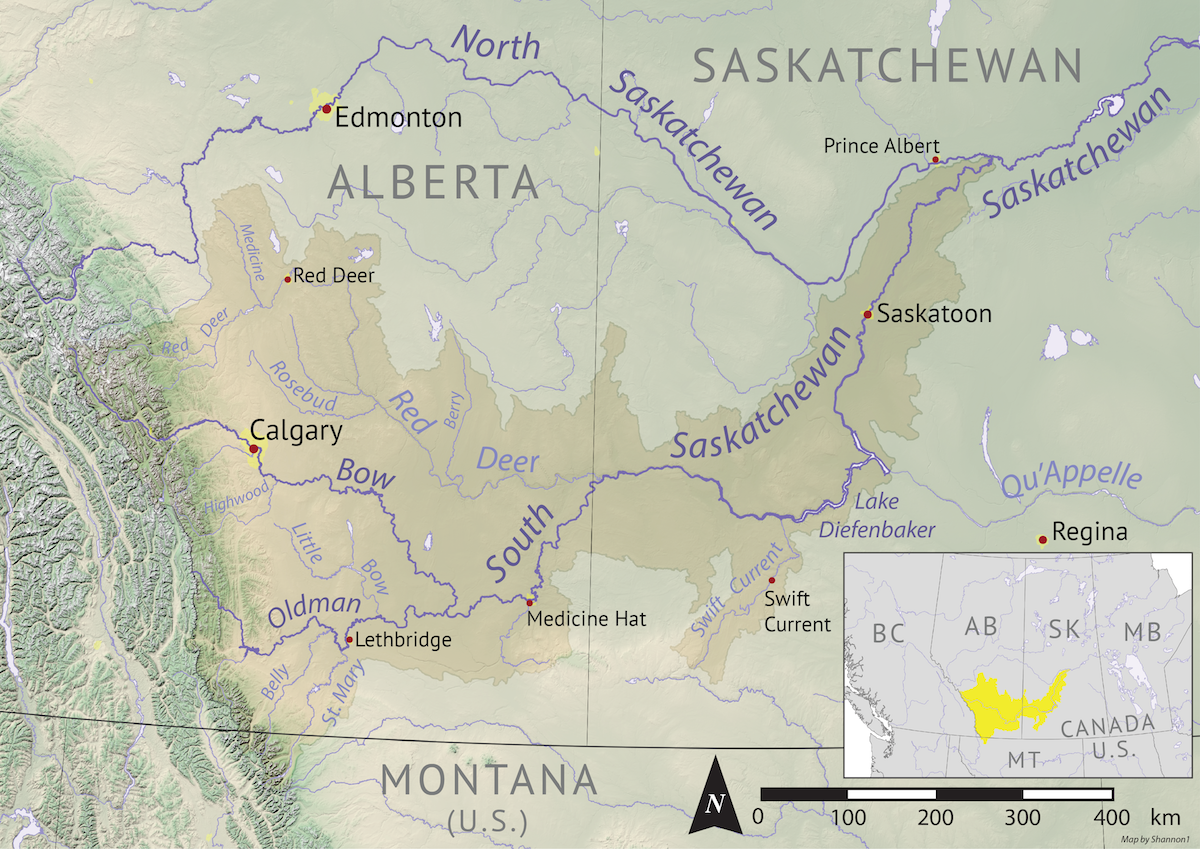
- The South Saskatchewan River drainage basin

- Location of the mouth in Saskatchewan Swift Current Creek (Canada)

Location
- Country: Canada
- Provinces: Saskatchewan

Physical characteristics
- Source: Cypress Hills
  - location: RM of Arlington No. 79
  - coordinates: 49.6712°N 108.7939°W
  - elevation: 1,143 m (3,750 ft)
- Mouth: Lake Diefenbaker
  - location: RM of Saskatchewan Landing No. 167; RM of Excelsior No. 166
  - coordinates: 50.6444°N 107.7365°W
  - elevation: 556 m (1,824 ft)
- Length: 230 km (140 mi)
- Basin size: 3,939 km^{2} (1,521 sq mi)

Basin features
- River system: South Saskatchewan River drainage basin
- Tributaries
  - left: Jones Creek; Bone Creek
  - right: Rock Creek; Pelletier Creek

Swift Current Creek is a river in the Canadian province of Saskatchewan. In the 1800s, Métis buffalo hunters called it Rivière au Courant (lit: "River of the Current"). This name was also adopted by the North-West Mounted Police on their March West in 1874. In 1883, the name Swift Current Creek was first published on official maps by the Department of the Interior. The river begins at an elevation of over 1,100 metres (3,600 ft) in the Cypress Hills and flows in a north-easterly direction through valleys and coulees en route to Lake Diefenbaker of the South Saskatchewan River in the semi-arid region known as Palliser's Triangle. Notable communities along the river's course include Swift Current, Waldeck, and South Fork.

== Course ==
Swift Current Creek begins at an elevation of 1,143 metres (3,750 ft) in the Cypress Hills. From its source, it flows south past Pine Cree Regional Park through valleys and coulees towards the south-eastern slopes of the hills. As it flows out of the Cypress Hills, it turns sharply north towards the community of South Fork where it follows a glacial meltwater channel that was formed during the last ice age. The river continues in a north-easterly direction and empties into Reid Lake. Reid Lake is a man-made lake that was formed with the construction of the Duncairn Dam along the course of Swift Current Creek in 1942. The dam was built by the Prairie Farm Rehabilitation Administration (PFRA) to supply water for the Rush Lake, Waldeck, and Herbert irrigation projects. The dam and reservoir are now owned and managed by the Saskatchewan Water Security Agency. Continuous releases are made from the reservoir "to meet the municipal requirements of Swift Current" and to regulate and maintain downstream water levels of Swift Current Creek.

From the dam at the north-eastern end of the lake, Swift Current Creek carries on in a north-easterly direction towards the city of Swift Current. After Swift Current, the river heads in a more easterly direction following the Trans-Canada Highway for about 20 kilometres (12 mi). About 4 kilometres (2.5 mi) east of Waldeck, Swift Current Creek changes direction and heads north towards Lake Diefenbaker, still following the meltwater channel. It empties into Swift Current Bay of Lake Diefenbaker, east of Saskatchewan Landing Provincial Park.

== Fish species ==
Fish species found in the river system include brown trout, walleye, yellow perch, and northern pike.

== See also ==
- List of rivers of Saskatchewan
