= Cypress Lake (Saskatchewan) =

Lake in Saskatchewan, Canada

- Location in Saskatchewan Cypress Lake (Canada)
- Location: RM of Reno No. 51, Saskatchewan
- Coordinates: 49.4667°N 109.4674°W
- Type: Reservoir
- Part of: Missouri River drainage basin
- River sources: Cypress Hills
- Primary outflows: Frenchman River
- Basin countries: Canada
- Surface area: 2,244.7 ha (5,547 acres)
- Max. depth: 5.5 m (18 ft)
- Shore length^{1}: 39.43 km (24.50 mi)
- Surface elevation: 970 m (3,180 ft)
- Islands: Heglund Island
- Settlements: None
- ^{1} Shore length is not a well-defined measure.

Cypress Lake is an interbasin transfer reservoir in the Canadian province of Saskatchewan on the southern slopes of the Cypress Hills in the Rural Municipality of Reno No. 51. The reservoir was created by the damming of the east and west sides of a much smaller Cypress Lake in the late 1930s. There is a provincial recreation site on the southern shore and a wildlife refuge on Heglund Island in the lake. Access to the lake is from Township Road 60 off of Highway 21.

Cypress Lake is the source of the Frenchman River and, being an interbasin reservoir, it supplies water to both the Frenchman River and Battle Creek watersheds. Frenchman River begins at Dam One on the eastern end of the lake while an outlet canal from Dam Two on the western end supplies water to Battle Creek.

== Irrigation project ==
The building of the two dams of Cypress Lake were part of a larger project to bring stability to the water levels of Battle Creek as during the summer months, the creek would often run dry. In 1936, near the headwaters of Battle Creek in the Cypress Hills, a dam was built along Adams Creek — a tributary of Battle Creek — that created Adams Lake (49.6582°N 109.8455°W). During the dry months, water could be released from Adams Lake to help prevent Battle Creek from dying up, which allowed for irrigation throughout the growing season. With plans originally conceived in 1908, Cypress Lake was turned into a reservoir in the late 1930s.

In 1937, contracts were handed out to several different companies to build various parts of the reservoir project at Cypress Lake, such as the building of Dam One at the east end of the lake, Dam Two at the west end, supply canals, outlet canals, the concrete structure, and the gravel facing for the earthen dams. Water for Cypress lake is supplied by diverting water from Belanger, Battle, and Sucker Creeks. Like Adams Lake, water from Cypress Lake is stored and then released during the dry season.

== Cypress Lake Recreation Site ==
Cypress Lake Recreation Site (49.4554°N 109.5012°W) is a provincial recreation site on the southern shore of Cypress Lake. It is a small, free campground with lake access and a boat launch.

== Heglund Island Wildlife Refuge ==
Heglund Island Wildlife Refuge (49.4726°N 109.4615°W) is a Saskatchewan wildlife refuge on Heglund Island in Cypress Lake.

== Fish species ==
Fish commonly found in Cypress Lake include walleye and northern pike.

== See also ==
- List of lakes of Saskatchewan
- List of protected areas of Saskatchewan
- Tourism in Saskatchewan
