= Scotsguard =

Community in Saskatchewan, Canada

- Unincorporated community
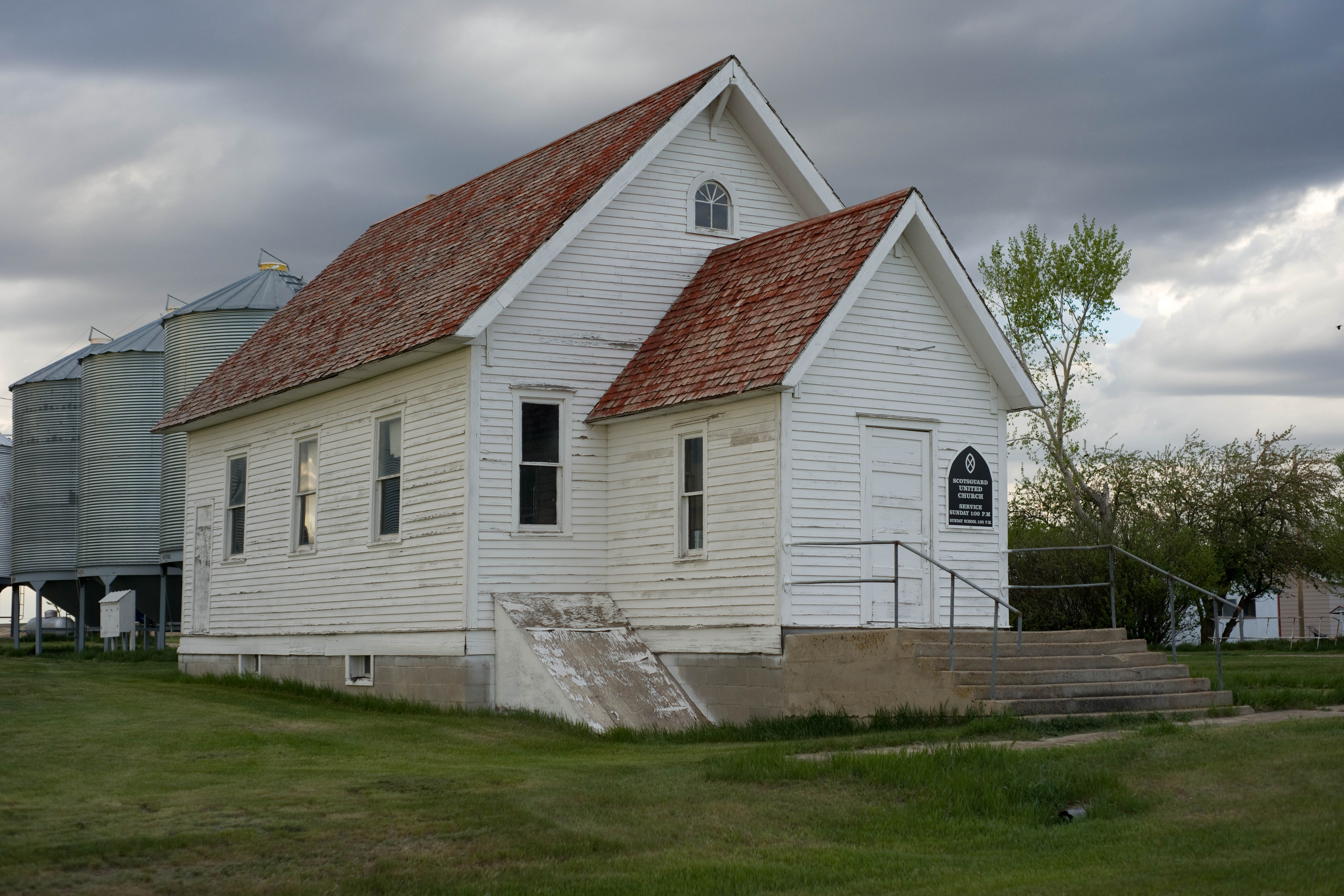
- Scotsguard United Church.
- Motto: "Little Chicago"
- Location within Saskatchewan Location within Canada
- Coordinates: 49.7167°N 108.1506°W
- Country: Canada
- Province: Saskatchewan
- Region: Southwest
- Rural municipality: Bone Creek No. 108
- Established: 1910
- Incorporated (Village): 1913
- Restructured (unincorporated): December 31, 1953

Government
  - Governing body: Bone Creek No. 108
  - MLA: Dave Marit
  - MP: Jeremy Patzer
- Time zone: CST
- Area code: 306
- Highways: Highway 13 (Red Coat Trail / Ghost Town Trail) / Highway 631
- Railways: Great Western Railway
- Waterways: Notukeu Creek

Scotsguard is an unincorporated community within the Rural Municipality of Bone Creek No. 108, Saskatchewan, Canada. The community is located on Highway 13, also known as the historic Red Coat Trail, about 10 kilometres (6.2 mi) northeast of the town of Shaunavon.

== Demographics ==
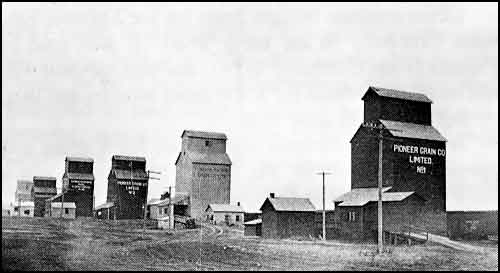
Scotsguard's six grain elevators, since demolished

Prior to December 31, 1953, Scotsguard was incorporated under village status, but was restructured as an unincorporated community under the jurisdiction of the Rural Municipality of Bone Creek No. 18 on that date. As of 2020, only two people live in Scotsguard. They acquired most of the land as residents left and have worked to preserve the village as a museum.

== See also ==
- List of communities in Saskatchewan
- Prohibition
- Rum runners
