= Nekaneet Cree Nation =

Indian reserve in Saskatchewan, Canada

- Band No. 380
- People: Cree
- Treaty: Treaty 4
- Headquarters: Maple Creek
- Province: Saskatchewan

Land
- Other reserve: Nekaneet Reserve
- Land area: 123.199 km^{2} (47.567 sq mi)

Population (2019)
- On reserve: 215
- On other land: 1
- Off reserve: 325
- Total population: 541

Government
- Chief: Rosa Wahobin

Tribal Council
- File Hills Qu'Appelle Tribal Council

Nekaneet Cree Nation (Cree: ᑳ ᓃᑳᓃᐟ kâ-nîkânît) is a Cree First Nations band government in southern Saskatchewan, Canada. In July 2022, they became signatories to the Buffalo Treaty.

== Reserves ==
- Nekaneet Cree Nation
- Treaty Four Reserve Grounds 77

== See also ==
- List of Indian reserves in Saskatchewan
