= Rural Municipality of Webb No. 138 =

Rural municipality in Saskatchewan, Canada

Webb No. 138
- Rural municipality
- Rural Municipality of Webb No. 138
- Location of the RM of Webb No. 138 in Saskatchewan
- Coordinates: 50.163°N 108.267°W
- Country: Canada
- Province: Saskatchewan
- Census division: 8
- SARM division: 3
- Formed: December 13, 1909

Government
  - Reeve: Dennis Fiddler
  - Governing body: RM of Webb No. 138 Council
  - Administrator: Raylene Packet
  - Office location: Webb

Area (2016)
  - Land: 1,098.78 km^{2} (424.24 sq mi)

Population (2016)
  - Total: 541
  - Density: 0.5/km^{2} (1.3/sq mi)
- Time zone: CST
  - Summer (DST): CST
- Area codes: 306 and 639

The Rural Municipality of Webb No. 138 (2016 population: 541) is a rural municipality (RM) in the Canadian province of Saskatchewan within Census Division No. 8 and SARM Division No. 3. It is located in the southwest portion of the province.

== History ==
The RM of Webb No. 138 incorporated as a rural municipality on December 13, 1909.

== Geography ==
=== Communities and localities ===
The following urban municipalities are surrounded by the RM.

Villages

- Webb

The following unincorporated communities are within the RM.

Localities

- Ferguson Bay
- Melaval
- Woodrow

== Demographics ==
Population history (1981–2016)
Year	Pop.	±%
1981	530	—
1986	504	−4.9%
1991	441	−12.5%
1996	465	+5.4%
2001	532	+14.4%
2006	556	+4.5%
2011	533	−4.1%
2016	541	+1.5%
2021	567	+4.8%
Source: Statistics Canada via Saskatchewan Bureau of Statistics

In the 2021 Census of Population conducted by Statistics Canada, the RM of Webb No. 138 had a population of 567 living in 131 of its 254 total private dwellings, a change of 4.8% from its 2016 population of 541. With a land area of 1,101.92 km^{2} (425.45 sq mi), it had a population density of 0.5/km^{2} (1.3/sq mi) in 2021.

In the 2016 Census of Population, the RM of Webb No. 138 recorded a population of 541 living in 144 of its 254 total private dwellings, a 1.5% change from its 2011 population of 533. With a land area of 1,098.78 km^{2} (424.24 sq mi), it had a population density of 0.5/km^{2} (1.3/sq mi) in 2016.

== Government ==
The RM of Webb No. 138 is governed by an elected municipal council and an appointed administrator that meets on the second Thursday of every month. The reeve of the RM is Dennis Fiddler while its administrator is Raylene Packet. The RM's office is located in Webb.

== See also ==
- List of rural municipalities in Saskatchewan
