= Blumenort, Saskatchewan =

Community in Saskatchewan, Canada

Blumenort
- Unincorporated community
- Location within Lac Pelletier No. 107 Location within Saskatchewan
- Coordinates: 49.9969°N 107.7567°W
- Country: Canada
- Province: Saskatchewan
- Region: Southwest Saskatchewan
- Rural municipality: Lac Pelletier No. 107

Government
  - Mayor: NA
  - Administrator: Rose Lawrence
  - Governing body: Lac Pelletier No. 107
- Time zone: CST
- Postal code: S0N 0E0
- Area code: 306
- Highways: Highway 4

Blumenort is an unincorporated community in the Rural Municipality of Lac Pelletier No. 107, Saskatchewan, Canada. The community is located on Highway 4, about 34 kilometres (21 mi) south of the city of Swift Current.

== See also ==
- List of communities in Saskatchewan
