= Consul, Saskatchewan =

Village in Saskatchewan, Canada

Consul
- Village
- Village of Consul
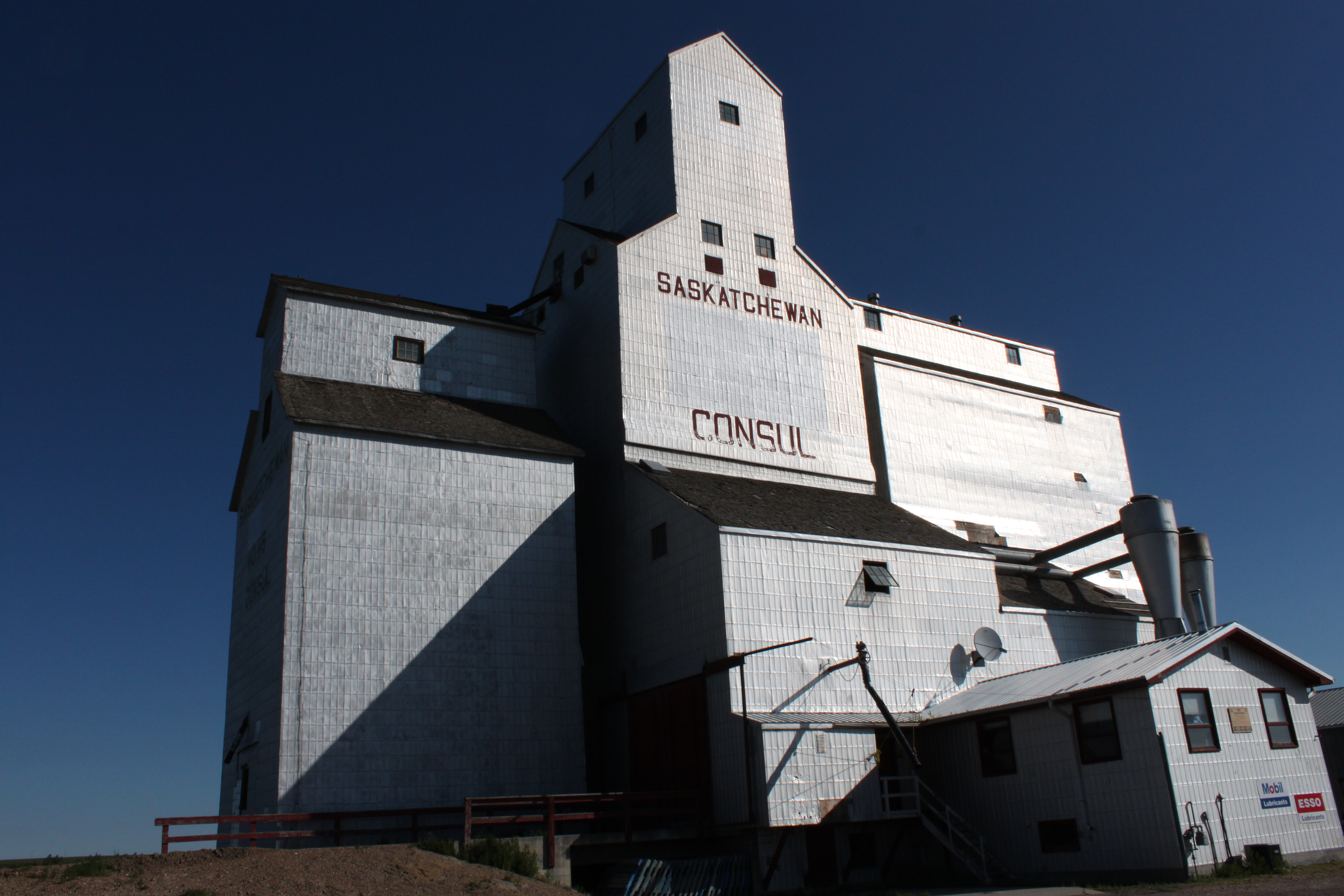
- The Former Saskatchewan Wheat Pool elevators in Consul

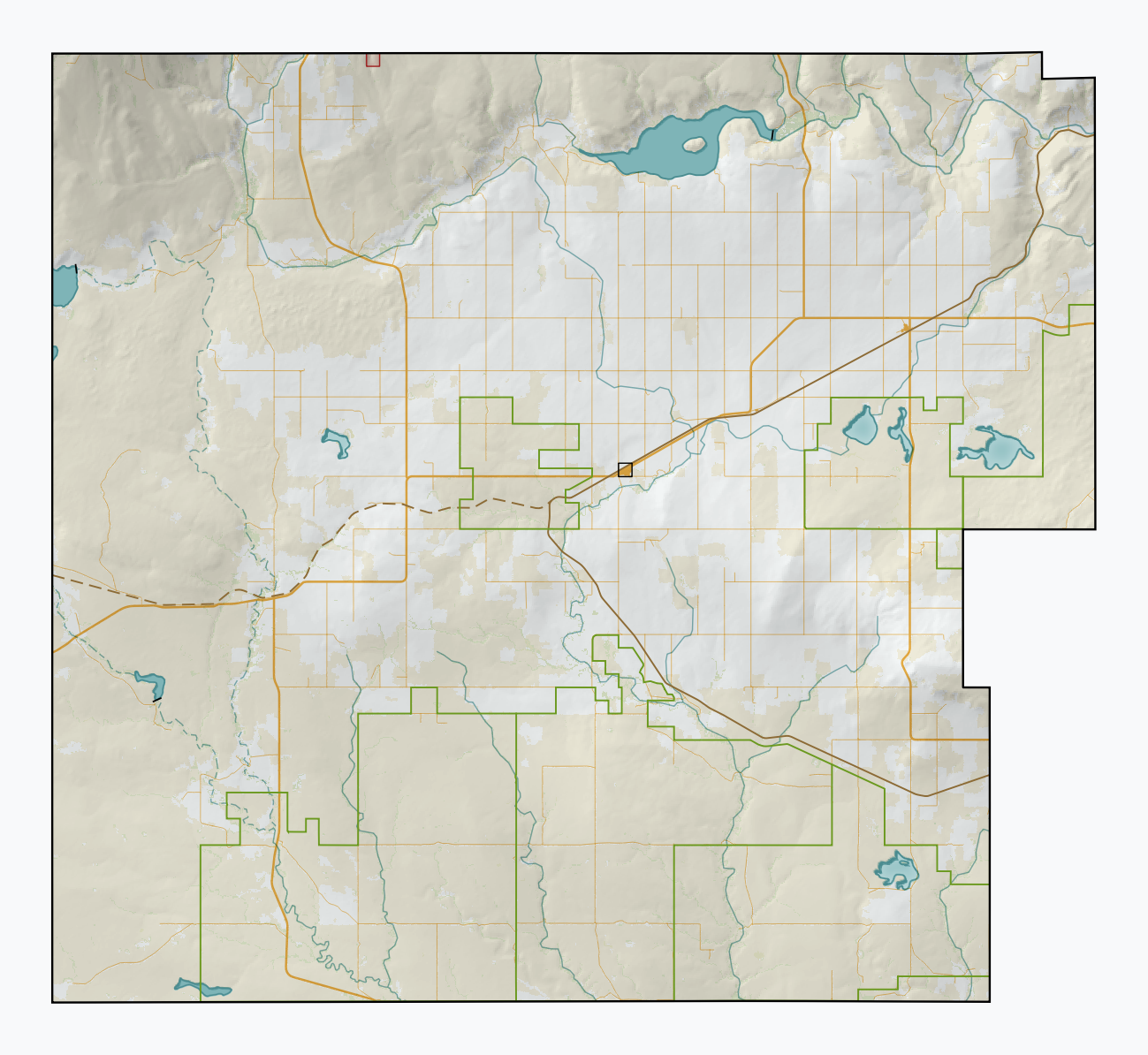
- Location within Reno No. 51 Location within Saskatchewan
- Coordinates: 49.2954°N 109.5198°W
- Country: Canada
- Province: Saskatchewan
- Region: Southwest
- Census division: 4
- Rural municipality: Reno No. 51

Government
  - Type: Municipal
  - Governing body: Consul Village Council
  - Mayor: Travis Seifert
  - Administrator: Yvonne Leismeister
  - MP: Jeremy Patzer
  - MLA: Doug Steele

Area
  - Land: 0.65 km^{2} (0.25 sq mi)

Population (2021)
  - Total: 50
  - Density: 130.1/km^{2} (337/sq mi)
- Time zone: UTC-6 (CST)
- Postal code: S0N 0P0
- Area code: 306
- Highways: Highway 13; Highway 21
- Railways: Great Western Railway

Consul (2021 population: 50) is a village in the Canadian province of Saskatchewan within the Rural Municipality of Reno No. 51 and Census Division No. 4. The historic Red Coat Trail and Highway 21 pass through the village. The village features one of the last existing grain elevators in the region. It is 211 kilometres (131 mi) southwest of the city of Swift Current.

The village has few amenities, but such include a bakery, motel, Co-Op, credit union, hair salon, and baseball diamonds. Consul school's is from Kindergarten to Grade 12.

== History ==
Consul incorporated as a village on June 12, 1917.

== Demographics ==
Population history (1981–2016)
Year	Pop.	±%
1981	153	—
1986	124	−19.0%
1991	114	−8.1%
1996	107	−6.1%
2001	91	−15.0%
2006	93	+2.2%
2011	84	−9.7%
2016	73	−13.1%
2021	50	−31.5%
Source: Statistics Canada via Saskatchewan Bureau of Statistics

In the 2021 Census of Population conducted by Statistics Canada, Consul had a population of 50 living in 30 of its 36 total private dwellings, a change of −31.5% from its 2016 population of 73. With a land area of 0.7 km^{2} (0.27 sq mi), it had a population density of 71.4/km^{2} (185.0/sq mi) in 2021.

In the 2016 Census of Population, the Village of Consul recorded a population of 73 living in 39 of its 40 total private dwellings, a −15.1% change from its 2011 population of 84. With a land area of 0.65 km^{2} (0.25 sq mi), it had a population density of 112.3/km^{2} (290.9/sq mi) in 2016.

== Education ==
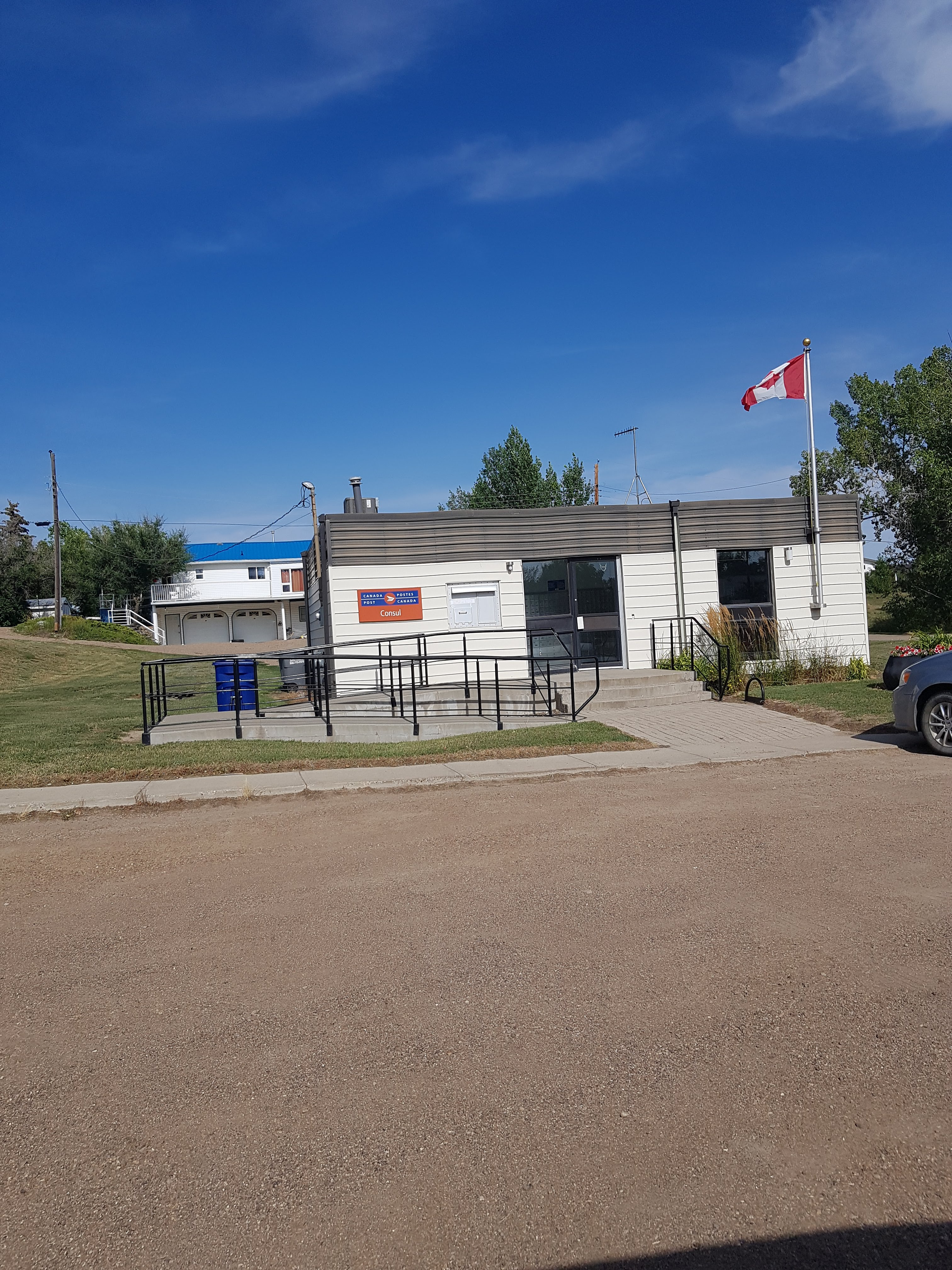

Consul School is a Kindergarten to Grade 12 facility serving approximately 70 students in the extreme southwest corner of Saskatchewan. Consul School is a part of the Chinook School Division which includes most of southwest Saskatchewan.

== See also ==
- List of communities in Saskatchewan
- List of villages in Saskatchewan
