= Orkney, Saskatchewan =

Hamlet in Saskatchewan, Canada

Orkney
- Unorganized hamlet
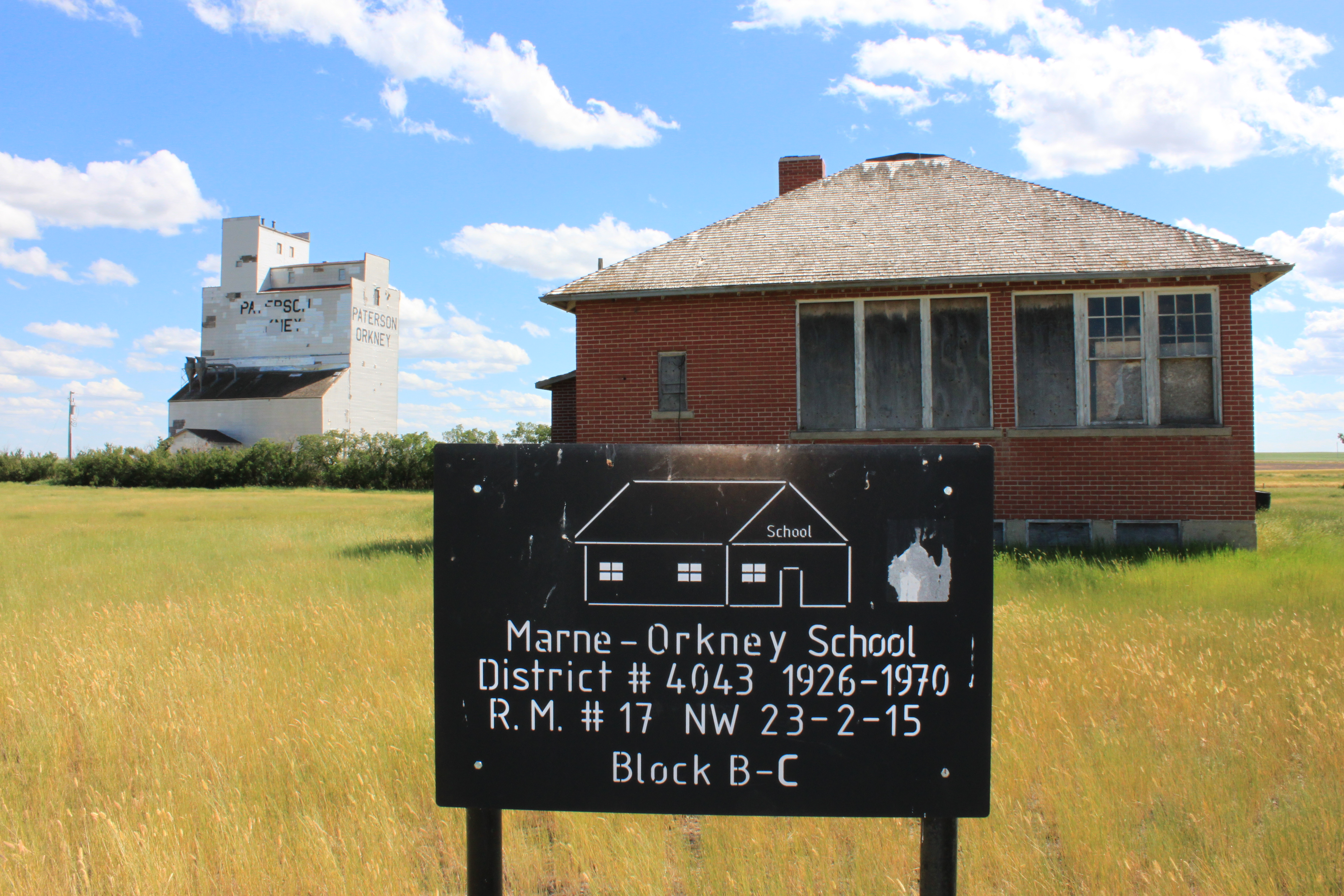
- Orkney School and ex. Patterson elevator in background.

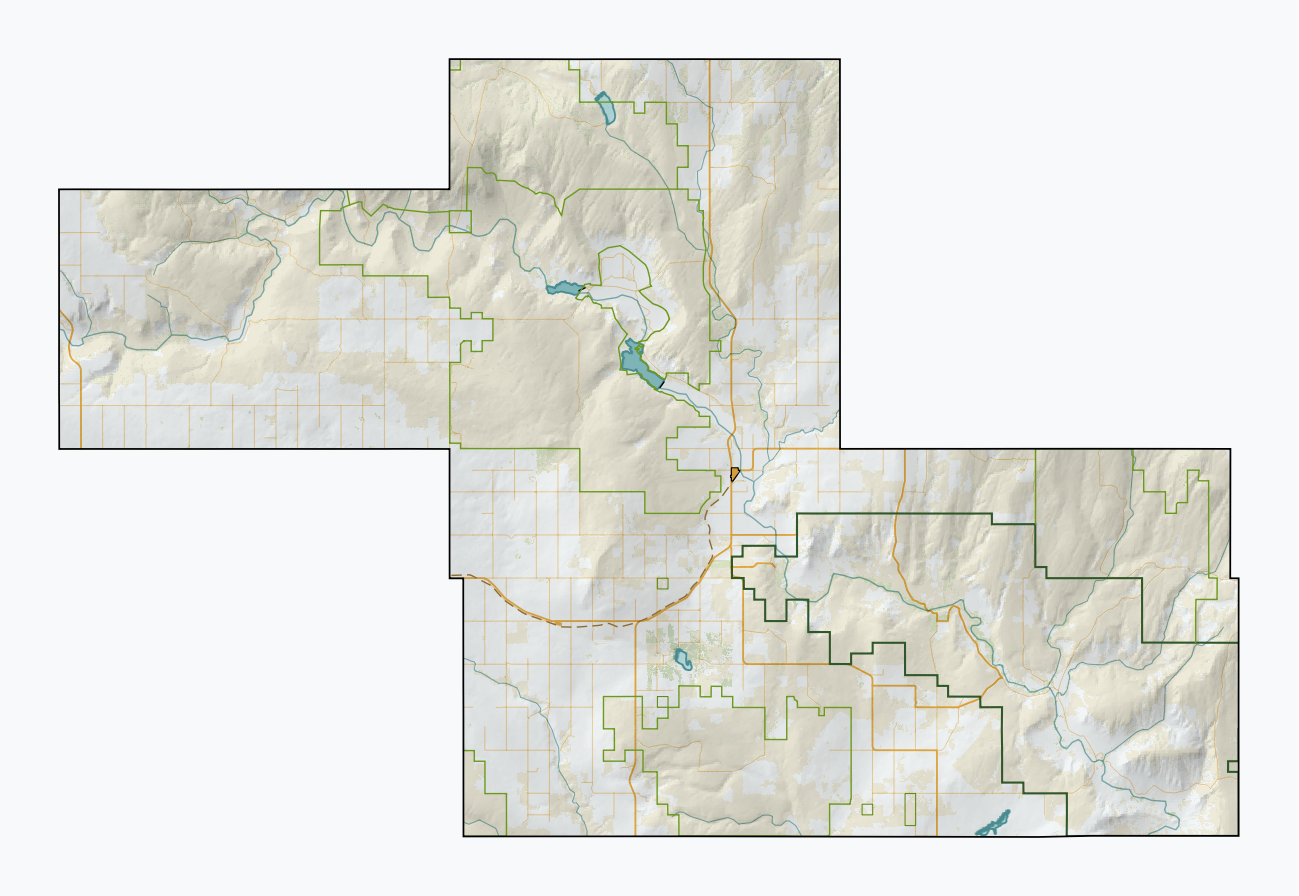
- Location within Val Marie No. 17 Location within Saskatchewan
- Coordinates: 49.1333°N 107.9172°W
- Country: Canada
- Province: Saskatchewan
- Region: Southwest Saskatchewan
- Rural municipality: Val Marie No. 17

Government
  - Governing body: RM of Val Marie No. 17
  - MLA: Dave Marit
  - MP: Jeremy Patzer

Area
  - Total: 0.23 km^{2} (0.089 sq mi)

Population (2011)
  - Total: 4
- Time zone: CST
- Postal code: S0N 1V0
- Area code: 306
- Highways: Highway 18

Orkney is an unincorporated community within the Rural Municipality of Val Marie No. 17, Saskatchewan, Canada. Founded in 1924 when the Canadian Pacific Railway constructed its branch line to Val Marie, it was incorporated as a village in June 1928. Orkney is ten miles from the Canada–United States border. Listed as a designated place by Statistics Canada, the hamlet had a population of four in the Canada 2011 Census.

== Etymology ==
Orkney was named after Orkney, Scotland, the boyhood home of local MP George Spence.

== History ==
Like the vast majority of Saskatchewan villages, Orkney was constructed as a planned railway townsite. Before construction, the area was served by the one-room school and rural post office at Diebolt. The village was founded when the CPR ran through the area in 1924. For the first year, buildings were erected randomly, as the townsite was only formally surveyed in 1925. In its heyday, the community had two grocery stores, a hotel, hardware store, pharmacy, barbershop, butcher, bank, lumber yard, fire hall, and post office. St. Mary's Anglican Church was constructed in 1927. To commemorate Saskatchewan's 2005 centennial, its bell was mounted on a cairn in the Orkney Cemetery.

When the Orkney post office still operated, the village was allocated the postal code S0N 1V0. No businesses function in the hamlet today.

== Demographics ==
Canada census – Orkney No. 244 community profile

	2021
Population	1,883 (+0.4% from 2016)
Land area	770.05 km^{2} (297.32 sq mi)
Population density	2.4/km^{2} (6.2/sq mi)
Median age	46.8 (M: 46.4, F: 47.2)
Private dwellings	755 (total)
Median household income

References: 2021

== Education ==
An abandoned brick schoolhouse still stands in Orkney. Orkney residents are bused to Frontier or Val Marie. Both villages cover kindergarten through grade 12 through the Chinook School Division.

== See also ==
- List of communities in Saskatchewan
- Designated place
