= Killdeer (disambiguation) =

A killdeer is a type of bird.

Killdeer may also refer to:

- Killdeer, Saskatchewan, Canada
- Killdeer, North Dakota, U.S.

== See also ==
- Kildeer, Illinois, U.S.
- Battle of Killdeer Mountain, a battle in the U.S. Army's 1864 Expedition against the Sioux, in Dakota Territory
