= Masefield, Saskatchewan =

Community in Saskatchewan, Canada

Masefield
- Unincorporated community
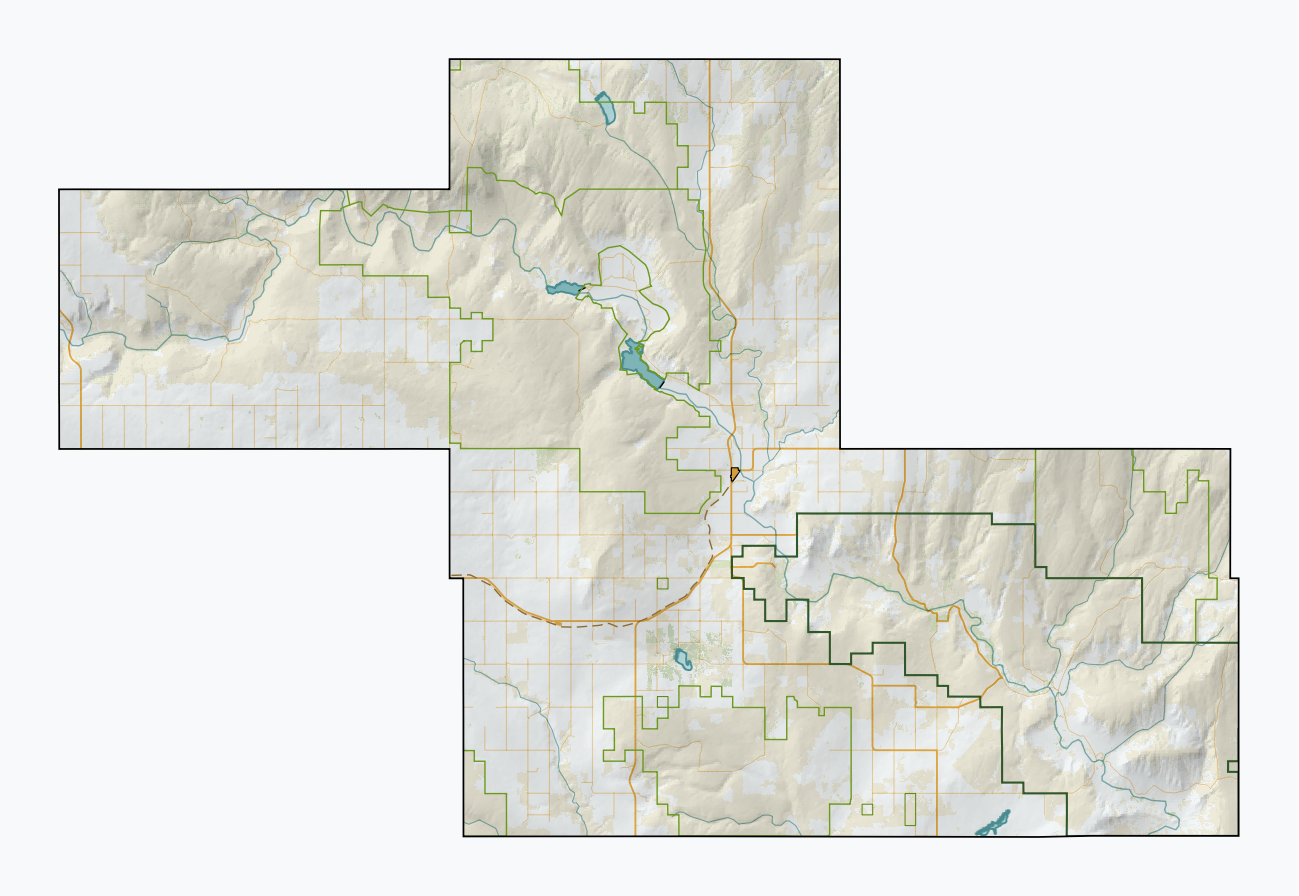
- Location within Val Marie No. 17 Location within Saskatchewan
- Coordinates: 49.151714°N 107.804353°W
- Country: Canada
- Province: Saskatchewan
- Region: Southwest
- Census division: 4
- Rural municipality: Val Marie No. 17

Government
  - Reeve: Mike Waldner
  - Administrator: Cathy Legault
  - Governing body: Val Marie No. 17

Population (2006)
  - Total: 0
- Time zone: CST
- Postal code: S0N 2T0
- Area code: 306
- Highways: Highway 18

Masefield is an unincorporated community within the Rural Municipality of Val Marie No. 17, Saskatchewan, Canada. The community is located on Highway 18, about 10 kilometres (6.2 mi) southwest of Val Marie.

== Etymology ==
Masefield was named after John Masefield, a contemporary English poet.

== History ==
Masefield once contained a store, lumber yard, pool hall, cafe, and blacksmith shop, as well as a three-room schoolhouse and three grain elevators. Crop failures began in 1925, causing many residents to take out new farms at Hays, Alberta, where a new irrigation project was being installed. Although no business operates in the community today, its name survives in the nearby Masefield Pasture, which is co-operatively managed.

== Demographics ==
In 2006, Masefield had a population of 0 living in 0 dwellings, a 0% increase from 2001. The community had a land area of 0.00 km^{2} (0 sq mi) and a population density of 0/km^{2} (0/sq mi).

== See also ==
- List of communities in Saskatchewan
