= Saskatchewan Highway 18 =

Provincial highway in Saskatchewan, Canada

Highway 18
- Highway 18 highlighted in red
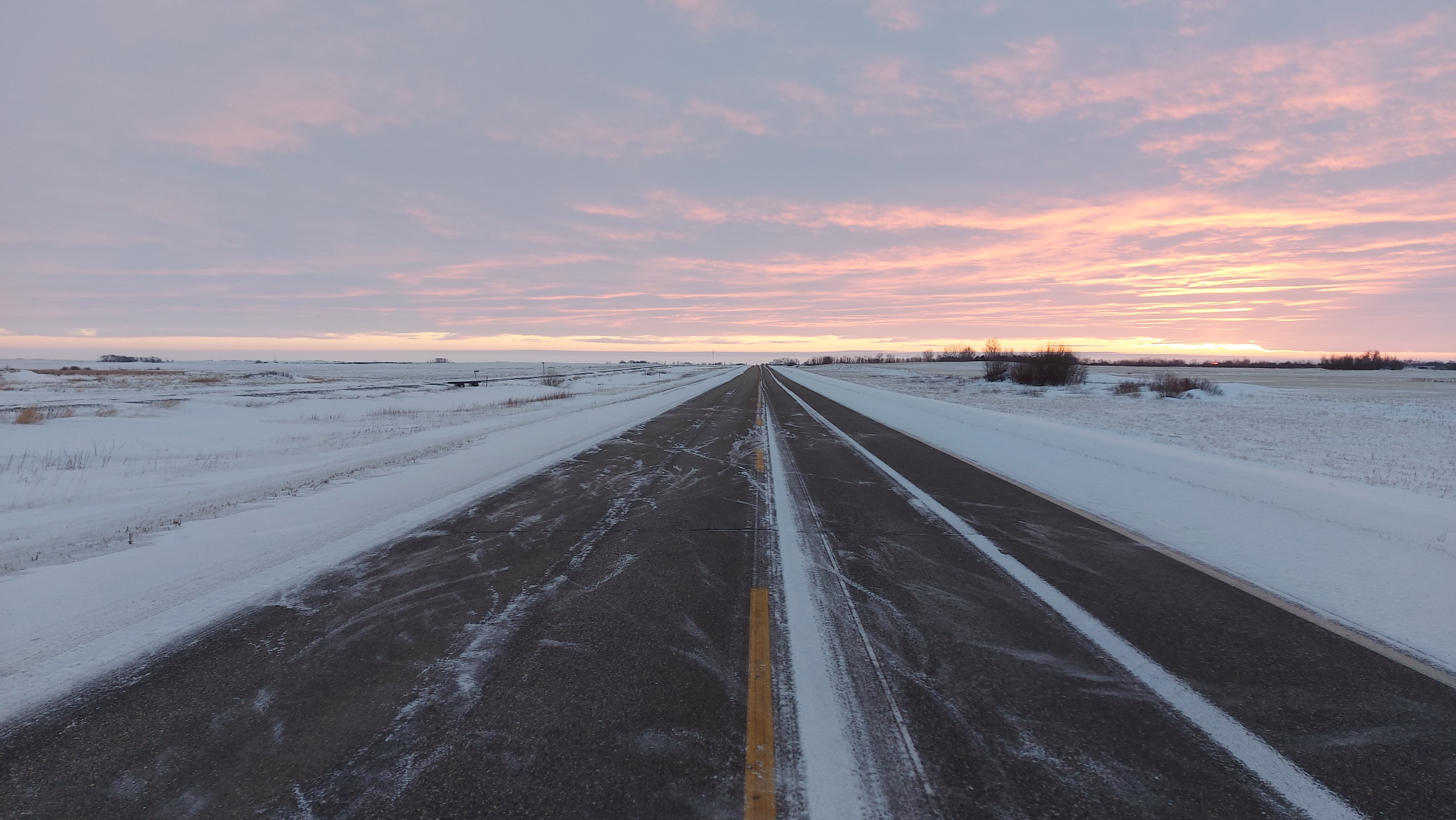
- Highway 18 at dawn in winter

Route information
- Maintained by Ministry of Highways and Infrastructure
- Length: 711.9 km (442.4 mi)

Major junctions
- West end: Highway 13 near Robsart
- Highway 37 at Climax; Highway 4 at Val Marie; Highway 19 near Mankota; Highway 2 at Killdeer and Rockglen; Highway 36 near Coronach; Highway 6 at Minton; Highway 35 / CanAm Highway at Oungre; Highway 47 at Estevan; Highway 9 near Alameda; Highway 8 at Carievale
- East end: PTH 3 at Manitoba border near Gainsborough

Location
- Country: Canada
- Province: Saskatchewan
- Rural municipalities: Reno, Frontier, Lone Tree, Val Marie, Glen McPherson, Mankota, Waverley, Old Post, Poplar Valley, Hart Butte, Happy Valley, Surprise Valley, Lake Alma, Cambria, Estevan, Coalfields, Enniskillen, Mount Pleasant, Argyle
- Major cities: Estevan

Highway system
- Provincial highways in Saskatchewan
← Highway 17	→ Highway 19

Highway 18 is an east–west provincial highway in the Canadian province of Saskatchewan. It runs from Highway 13 near Robsart, approximately 65 kilometres (40 mi) east of the Alberta border, to the Manitoba border near Gainsborough, where it becomes Manitoba Highway 3. It passes through three major communities, all in south-east Saskatchewan — Estevan, Oxbow, and Carnduff. It also passes north of the West and East Blocks of Grasslands National Park. Highway 18 is about 712 kilometres (442 mi) long, which is the longest east–west highway and second longest highway in Saskatchewan.

== History ==
The original segment of Highway 18 ran from the Manitoba border, through Estevan, to Lake Alma, before turning north, passing through Radville, and terminating at Highway 13 approximately 30 kilometres (19 mi) west of Weyburn. In the 1960s, Highway 18 was extended west to Highway 6 near Minton along an upgraded grid road, resulting in the north–south section between Lake Alma and Highway 13 being renumbered as Highway 28. In the 1970s, Highway 18 was again extended west along a series of upgraded grid roads and existing highways — former highways include Highway 336 between Coronach and Rockglen; Highway 319 between Wood Mountain and Highway 19 near Mankota; and Highway 46 between Highway 4 near Orkney and Claydon.

== Route description ==
The western terminus of Highway 18 begins south of the Cypress Hills at Highway 13 and Robsart as a gravel road. The highway heads south from there for 26 kilometres (16 mi) towards the Old Man on His Back Plateau and the Canada–United States border before beginning its eastward routing. Travelling east, Highway 18 rounds the southern slopes of Old Man on His Back Plateau and provides access to Divide, Old Man on His Back Prairie and Heritage Conservation Area, Claydon, Loomis, and Frontier as it heads to Highway 37 and Climax. From Claydon east, the highway is paved. It has a short 1.4-kilometre (0.87 mi) long concurrency with the north–south 37 before resuming its eastward routing towards Val Marie. Communities along this stretch include Canuck, Bracken, Orkney, and Masefield. Leading up to Val Marie, Highway 18 shares a 15-kilometre (9.3 mi) long concurrency with Highway 4. Access to the West Block of the Grasslands National Park is about 5 kilometres (3.1 mi) south of Val Marie.

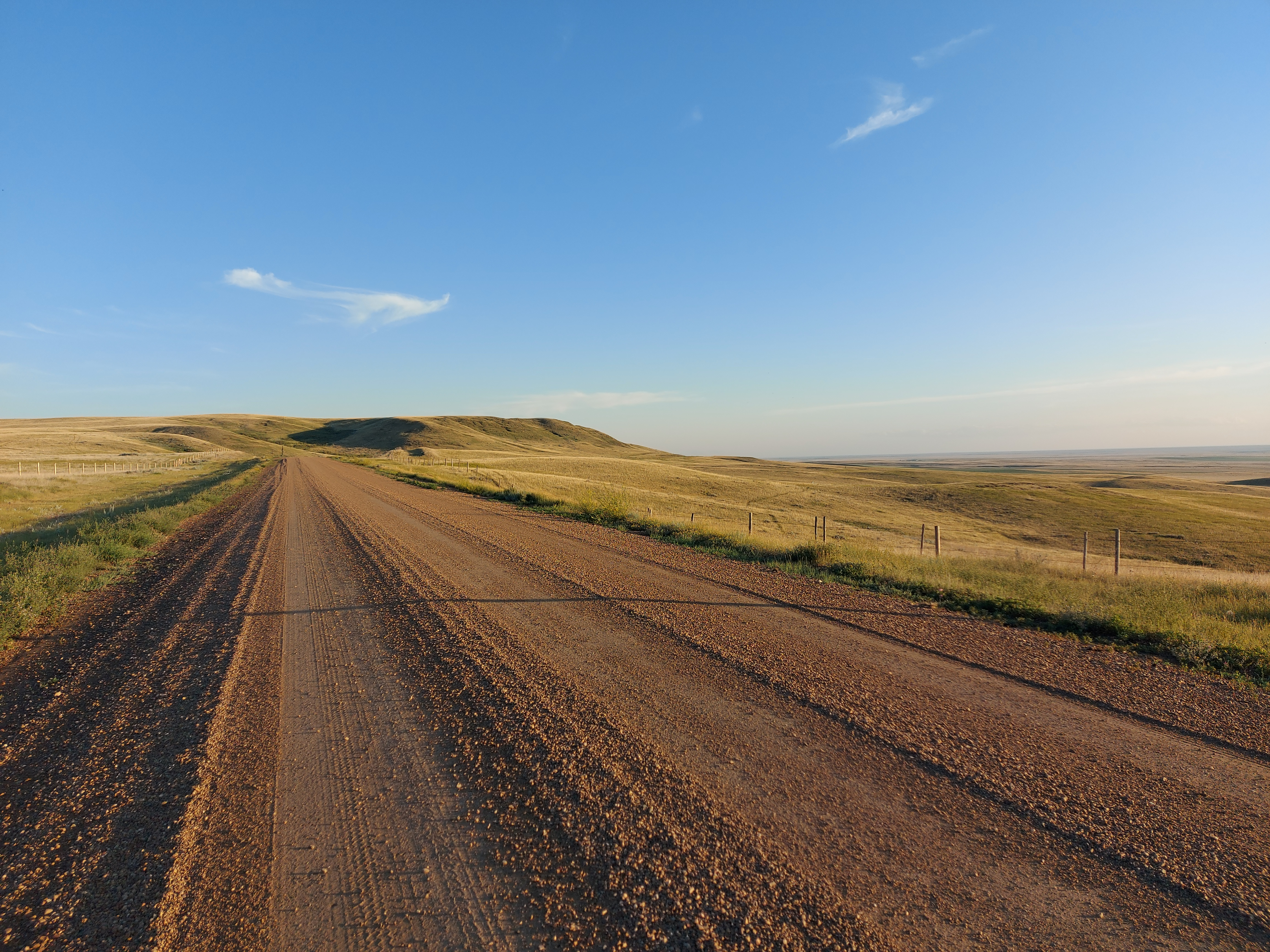
Highway 18 rounding the southern slopes of Old Man on His Back Plateau

At Val Marie, Highway 18 leaves the concurrency with 4 and heads east through town along River Street and then crosses the Frenchman River. Several kilometres east of Val Marie, Highway 18 turns north and enters the Wood Mountain Hills. Once in the hills, it turns east and follows the northern slopes towards the village of Wood Mountain. Communities along this stretch include Mankota, Ferland, McCord, Glentworth, and Fir Mountain. East of McCord, the highway crosses Wood River. About one mile south of Wood Mountain, Highway 18 turns south where it once again enters the Wood Mountain Hills and passes by Wood Mountain Regional Park and Wood Mountain Provincial Park. It continues south out of the hills where it provides access to the East Block of Grasslands National Park and meets Highway 2 a few kilometres north of the U.S. border crossing of Opheim–West Poplar River. Highways 2 and 18 begin an eastward concurrency that continues to Rockglen. Communities along this segment include Killdeer, Canopus, and Quantock. East of Canopus, the highway crosses the Poplar River. At Rockglen Highway 2 turns north while 18 continues east to Highway 36. Along this stretch, Highway 18 provides access to Fife Lake and Rockin Beach Regional Park.

At the junction with Highway 36, the two highways begin a 21-kilometre (13 mi) long concurrency that heads south-east towards Coronach. Highway 36 drops south to the U.S. border while 18 continues eastward past Big Beaver towards the Big Muddy Badlands and Highway 6. Highway 6 and 18 have a 9.7-kilometre (6.0 mi) long concurrency that heads north towards Minton. Prior to Minton, 18 turns back east. It continues east en route to Estevan providing access to several communities including Gladmar, Lake Alma, Beaubier, Ratcliffe, Oungre, Torquay, and Outram; intersects Highways 28, 707, 35, 606, 350 and 47; and crosses Long Creek and Souris River. On the south side of Estevan, Highway 18 meets Highway 47 and begins a short northward 1.4-kilometre (0.87 mi) long concurrency that goes into the city. Near the centre of town, Highway 47 turns west concurrent with 4th Street and 18 turns east concurrent 4th Street. As 18 leaves Estevan, it opens up into a 10-kilometre (6.2 mi) long divided highway that runs concurrently with Highway 39A and then Highway 39. About 9 kilometres (5.6 mi) east of Estevan, Highways 18 and 39 split off with 39 turning south-east to North Portal and the Canada–United States border and 18 continuing east towards the border with Manitoba.

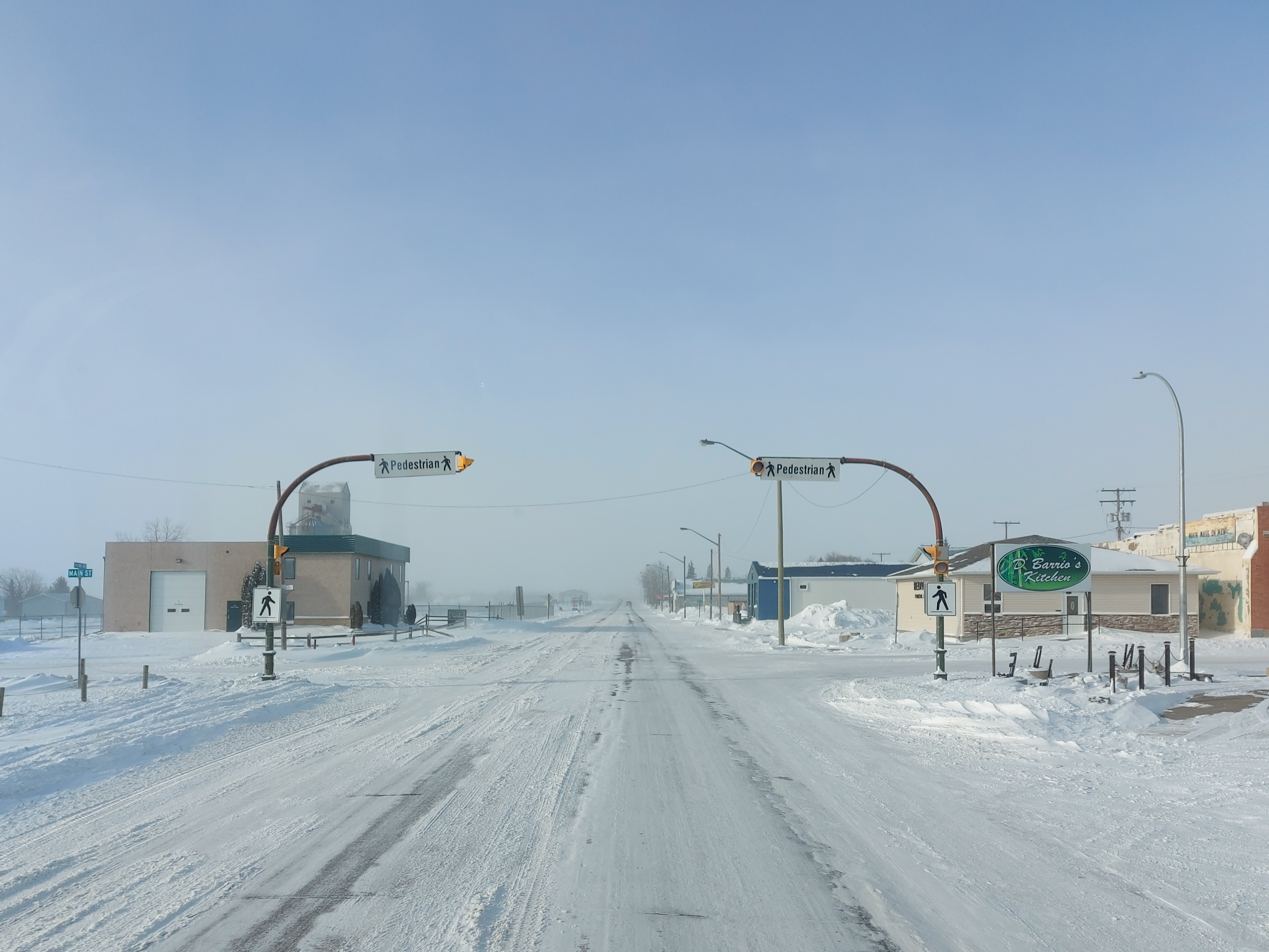
Highway 18 through Oxbow

Bienfait, the first community on this section of highway, is about 3 kilometres (1.9 mi) east of Highway 18's junction with 39. The highway continues east from Bienfait and provides access to multiple communities, such as Hirsch, Frobisher, Oxbow, Glen Ewen, Carnduff, Carievale, and Gainsborough; intersects several highways, including 605, 604, 9, 603, 601, 318, 8, and 600; and crosses the rivers of Moose Mountain Creek, Antler River, and Gainsborough Creek. The eastern terminus, at only 2 miles east of Gainsborough, is at the border with Manitoba where it carries on as Manitoba Highway 3.

== Major intersections ==
From west to east:

Rural municipality	Location	km	mi	Destinations	Notes
Reno No. 51	Robsart	0.0	0.0	Highway 13 (Red Coat Trail) – Consul, Eastend, Shaunavon	
Frontier No. 19	Claydon	59.9	37.2		
Frontier No. 19		71.3	44.3	Highway 614 north – Eastend	
Frontier No. 19	Frontier	84.3	52.4	Highway 613 north – Dollard	
Lone Tree No. 18	Climax	96.4	59.9	Highway 37 north – Shaunavon, Gull Lake	West end of Highway 37 concurrency
Lone Tree No. 18	Climax	97.8	60.8	Highway 37 south – Port of Climax (U.S. border)	East end of Highway 37 concurrency
Lone Tree No. 18	Bracken	119.5	74.3		
Lone Tree No. 18	Orkney	133.1	82.7		
Val Marie No. 17		139.9	86.9	Highway 4 south – U.S. border (Port of Monchy)	South of Masefield; west end of Highway 4 concurrency
Val Marie No. 17		149.1	92.6	Highway 607 east – Grasslands National Park (West Block)	
Val Marie No. 17	Val Marie	154.7	96.1	Highway 4 north – Swift Current	East end of Highway 4 concurrency
Glen McPherson No. 46		190.3	118.2	Highway 628 north – Ponteix	
Glen McPherson No. 46		204.9	127.3	Range Road 3103 – Aneroid, Reliance	
Mankota No. 45	Mankota	221.5	137.6		
Mankota No. 45		227.3	141.2	Highway 19 north – Kincaid	East of Ferland
Mankota No. 45	McCord	240.7	149.6	Highway 611 north – Meyronne	
Waverley No. 44		247.2	153.6	Highway 610 north – Woodrow	
Waverley No. 44	Glentworth	252.1	156.6		
Waverley No. 44		263.8	163.9	Highway 58 north – Lafleche	West of Fir Mountain
Old Post No. 43	Wood Mountain	279.3	173.5	Highway 358 north – Limerick	
Old Post No. 43		307.7	191.2	Township Road 22 – Grasslands National Park (East Block)	
Old Post No. 43	Killdeer	311.3	193.4	Highway 2 south – U.S. border (Port of West Poplar River)	West end of Highway 2 concurrency
Poplar Valley No. 12	Rockglen	348.5	216.5	Highway 2 north – Assiniboia, Moose Jaw	East end of Highway 2 concurrency
Poplar Valley No. 12		365.2	226.9	Fife Lake Access Road	
Poplar Valley No. 12		371.9	231.1	Highway 36 north – Willow Bunch	West end of Highway 36 concurrency
Hart Butte No. 11	Coronach	383.0	238.0	Highway 602 north – Harptree	
Hart Butte No. 11		393.4	244.4	Highway 36 south – U.S. border (Port of Coronach)	East end of Highway 36 concurrency
Happy Valley No. 10	Big Beaver	411.9	255.9	Highway 34 – Bengough, U.S. border (closed)	Border crossing to U.S. closed.
Surprise Valley No. 9		460.1	285.9	Highway 6 south – U.S. border (Port of Regway)	West end of Highway 6 concurrency
Surprise Valley No. 9	Minton	469.9	292.0	Highway 6 north – Regina	East end of Highway 6 concurrency
Lake Alma No. 8	Lake Alma	497.7	309.3	Highway 28 north – Radville	
Souris Valley No. 7		507.5	315.3	Highway 707 south – Beaubier	
Souris Valley No. 7	Oungre	526.9	327.4	Highway 35 / CanAm Highway – Weyburn, U.S. border (Port of Oungre)	
Souris Valley No. 7		536.6	333.4	Bromhead Access Road	
Cambria No. 6	Torquay	549.6	341.5	Highway 350 south – U.S. border (Port of Torquay) Highway 606 north – Midale	
Estevan No. 5	No major junctions				
City of Estevan		587.7	365.2	Souris Avenue (Highway 47 south) – U.S. border (Port of Estevan Highway)	West end of Highway 47 concurrency
City of Estevan		589.1	366.0	4th Street (Highway 39A north) / Highway 47 north – Weyburn, Stoughton Souris Avenue	East end of Highway 47 concurrency; west end of Highway 39A concurrency
City of Estevan		594.2	369.2	Highway 39 north (Estevan Bypass) – Weyburn, Regina	East end of Highway 39A concurrency; west end of Highway 39 concurrency
Estevan No. 5		600.5	373.1	Highway 39 south – North Portal, U.S. border (Port of North Portal)	West end of Highway 39 concurrency
↑ / ↓	Bienfait	602.9	374.6		
Coalfields No. 4		606.5	376.9	Highway 605 north – Lampman	
Coalfields No. 4		625.5	388.7	Highway 604 south – North Portal	West end of Highway 604 concurrency
Coalfields No. 4	Frobisher	630.5	391.8	Highway 604 north – Arcola	East end of Highway 604 concurrency
Enniskillen No. 3		642.9	399.5	Highway 9 south – U.S. border (Port of Northgate)	West end of concurrency with Highway 9
Enniskillen No. 3		644.5	400.5	Highway 9 north – Alameda, Carlyle	East end of concurrency with Highway 9
Enniskillen No. 3	Oxbow	651.0	404.5	Highway 603 south	West end of Highway 603 concurrency
Enniskillen No. 3		659.5	409.8	Highway 603 north – Manor	East end of Highway 603 concurrency
Enniskillen No. 3	Glen Ewen	662.8	411.8	Highway 601 north	
Mount Pleasant No. 2	Carnduff	680.1	422.6	Highway 318 north – Alida	
Mount Pleasant No. 2		691.7	429.8	Highway 8 north – Redvers, Moosomin	West end of Highway 8 concurrency
Mount Pleasant No. 2	Carievale	692.4	430.2	Highway 8 south – U.S. border (Port of Carievale)	East end of Highway 8 concurrency
Argyle No. 1	Gainsborough	706.5	439.0	Highway 600 north – Fertile	
Argyle No. 1		711.9	442.4	PTH 3 east – Melita, Morden, Winnipeg	Continuation into Manitoba
1.000 mi = 1.609 km; 1.000 km = 0.621 mi: Concurrency terminus; Route transition

== See also ==
- Roads in Saskatchewan
- Transportation in Saskatchewan
