= Rural Municipality of Mankota No. 45 =

Rural municipality in Saskatchewan, Canada

Mankota No. 45
- Rural municipality
- Rural Municipality of Mankota No. 45
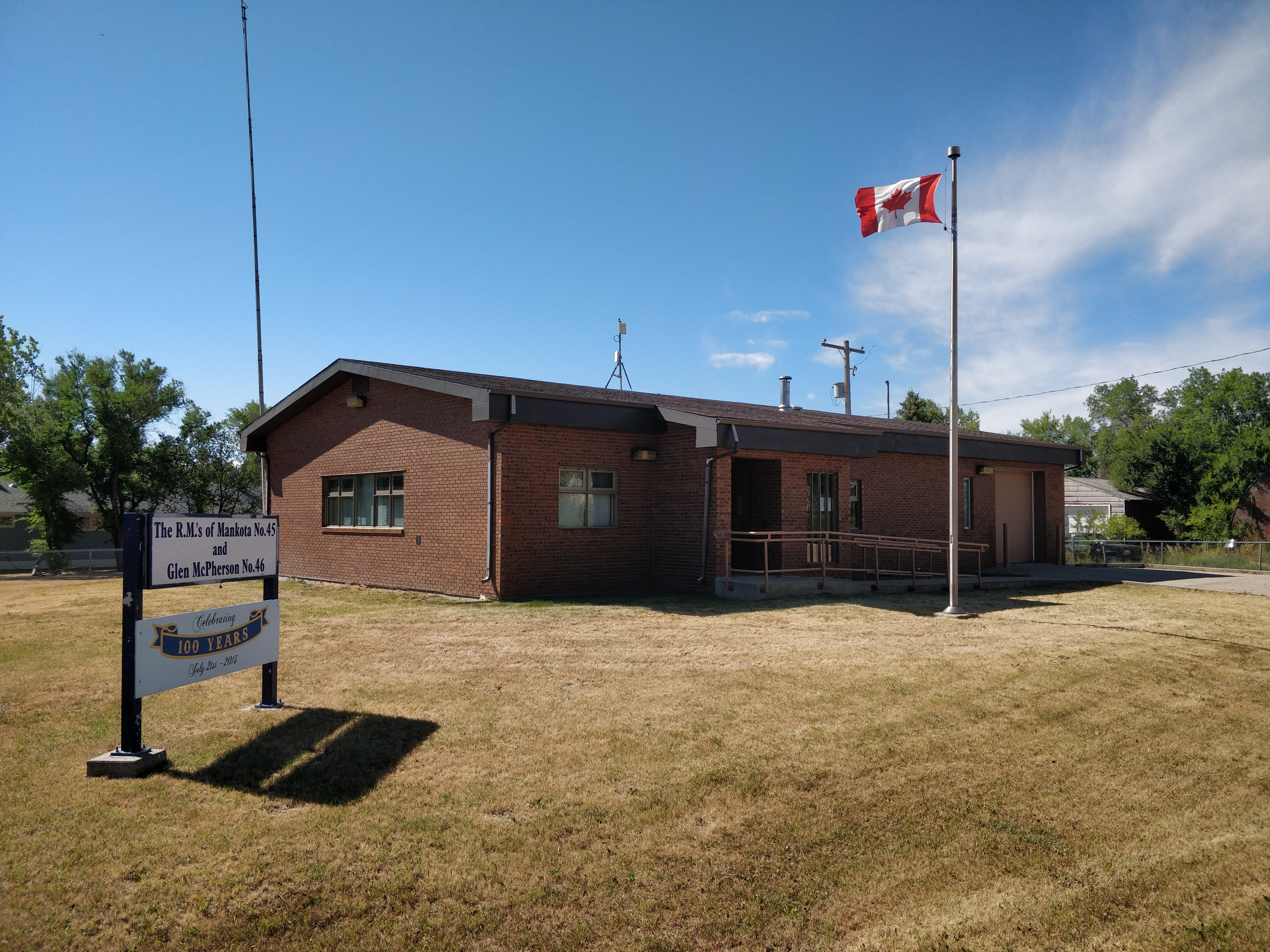
- R.M. office in Mankota

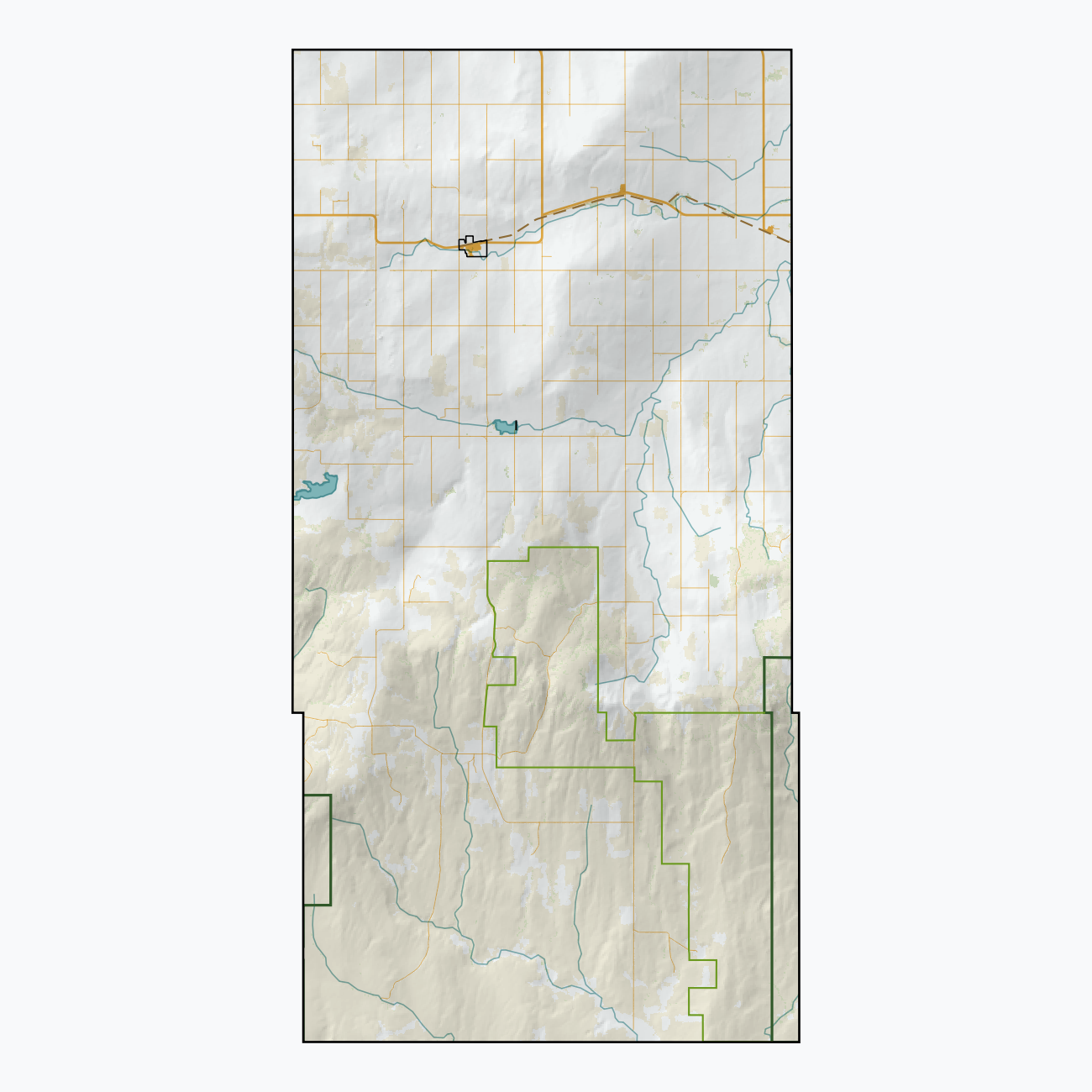

- Location of the RM of Mankota No. 45 in Saskatchewan
- Coordinates: 49.319°N 107.023°W
- Country: Canada
- Province: Saskatchewan
- SARM division: 3
- Federal riding: Cypress Hills—Grasslands
- Provincial riding: Wood River
- Formed: January 1, 1913

Government
  - Reeve: Greg Zerr
  - Governing body: RM of Mankota No. 45 Council
  - Administrator: Tammi Baldock
  - Office location: Mankota

Area (2016)
  - Land: 1,696.35 km^{2} (654.96 sq mi)

Population (2016)
  - Total: 292
  - Density: 0.2/km^{2} (0.52/sq mi)
- Time zone: CST
  - Summer (DST): CST
- Postal code: S0H 2W0
- Area codes: 306 and 639
- Highway(s): Highway 18; Highway 19; Highway 611
- Point(s) of interest: Grasslands National Park

The Rural Municipality of Mankota No. 45 (2016 population: 292) is a rural municipality (RM) in the Canadian province of Saskatchewan within SARM Division No. 3. Located in the southwest portion of the province, it is adjacent to the United States border, neighbouring Valley County and Phillips County in Montana.

== History ==
The RM of Mankota No. 45 incorporated as a rural municipality on January 1, 1913.

== Geography ==
=== Communities and localities ===
The following urban municipalities are surrounded by the RM.

Villages

- Mankota

The following unincorporated communities are within the RM.

Organized hamlets

- McCord

Localities

- Billimun
- Ferland
- Horse Creek
- McEachern
- Milly
- Summercove
- Wideview

== Demographics ==
Population history (1981–2016)
Year	Pop.	±%
1981	526	—
1986	561	+6.7%
1991	559	−0.4%
1996	506	−9.5%
2001	430	−15.0%
2006	382	−11.2%
2011	322	−15.7%
2016	292	−9.3%
Source: Statistics Canada via Saskatchewan Bureau of Statistics

In the 2021 Census of Population conducted by Statistics Canada, the RM of Mankota No. 45 had a population of 289 living in 129 of its 158 total private dwellings, a change of −1% from its 2016 population of 292. With a land area of 1,693.17 km^{2} (653.74 sq mi), it had a population density of 0.2/km^{2} (0.4/sq mi) in 2021.

In the 2016 Census of Population, the RM of Mankota No. 45 recorded a population of 292 living in 132 of its 154 total private dwellings, a −9.3% change from its 2011 population of 322. With a land area of 1,696.35 km^{2} (654.96 sq mi), it had a population density of 0.2/km^{2} (0.4/sq mi) in 2016.

== Government ==
The RM of Mankota No. 45 is governed by an elected municipal council and an appointed administrator that meets on the second Tuesday of every month. The reeve of the RM is Greg Zerr while its administrator is Tammi Baldock. The RM's office is located in Mankota.

== Transportation ==
- Highway 18
- Highway 19
- Highway 611

== See also ==
- List of rural municipalities in Saskatchewan
