= Beaubier =

Beaubier may refer to:

- Cameron Beaubier (born 1992), American motorcycle racer
- David Wilson Beaubier (1864–1938), Canadian politician
- Northstar (Jean-Paul Beaubier), a Marvel Comics superhero
- Aurora (Jeanne-Marie Beaubier), a Marvel Comics superhero
- Beaubier, Saskatchewan, Canadian hamlet
