= Rosefield =

Rosefield may refer to:

== Places ==
- Rosefield, Saskatchewan, Canada
- Rosefield, Louisiana, United States
- Rosefield (Windsor, North Carolina), a plantation house
- Rosefield Township, Peoria County, Illinois, United States

== People ==
- Joseph L. Rosefield (1882–1958), American businessman

== See also ==
- Steven Rosefielde (born 1942), American economist
