= Climax, Saskatchewan =

Village in Saskatchewan, Canada

Climax
- Village
- Village of Climax
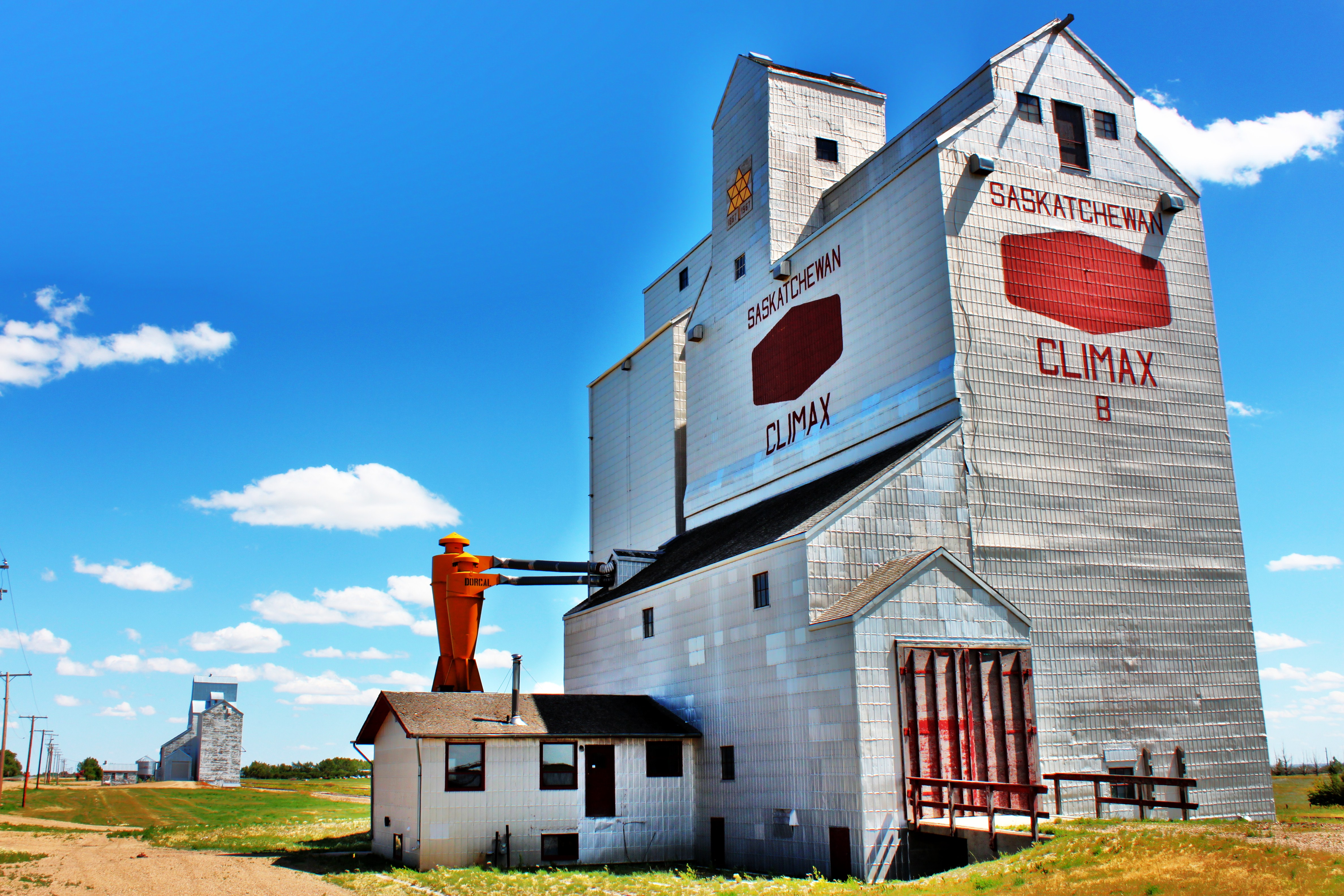
- Grain elevators along the railway tracks in Climax

- Location within Lone Tree No. 18 Location within Saskatchewan
- Coordinates: 49.2064°N 108.386°W
- Country: Canada
- Province: Saskatchewan
- Region: Southwest
- Census division: 4
- Rural Municipality: Lone Tree
- Post office Founded: 1913

Government
  - Type: Municipal
  - Governing body: Climax Village Council
  - Mayor: Dennis Klein
  - Administrator: Marla Shirley
  - MP: Jeremy Patzer
  - MLA: Doug Steele

Area
  - Village: 1.00 km^{2} (0.39 sq mi)

Population (2021)
  - Village: 137
  - Density: 137/km^{2} (350/sq mi)
  - Metro: 137
- Time zone: UTC-6 (CST)
- Postal code: S0N 0N0
- Area code: 306
- Highways: Highway 18; Highway 37
- Railways: Great Western Railway

Climax (2016 population: 195) is a village in the Canadian province of Saskatchewan within the Rural Municipality of Lone Tree No. 18 and Census Division No. 4. The village is located in the southwestern region of the province, just north of the U.S. border, situated on Highway 18 between Frontier and Canuck and on Highway 37 between Shaunavon and the Port of Climax.

== History ==
Climax incorporated as a village on December 11, 1923. The community was named after Climax, Minnesota, the home town of early homesteader Christ Fuglestad.

== Demographics ==
Population history (1981–2016)
Year	Pop.	±%
1981	293	—
1986	268	−8.5%
1991	226	−15.7%
1996	206	−8.8%
2001	206	+0.0%
2006	182	−11.7%
2011	182	+0.0%
2016	195	+7.1%
2021	137	−29.7%
Source: Statistics Canada via Saskatchewan Bureau of Statistics

In the 2021 Census of Population conducted by Statistics Canada, Climax had a population of 137 living in 72 of its 102 total private dwellings, a change of −29.7% from its 2016 population of 195. With a land area of 0.94 km^{2} (0.36 sq mi), it had a population density of 145.7/km^{2} (377.5/sq mi) in 2021.

In the 2016 Census of Population, the Village of Climax recorded a population of 195 living in 93 of its 113 total private dwellings, a 6.7% change from its 2011 population of 182. With a land area of 1 km^{2} (0.39 sq mi), it had a population density of 195.0/km^{2} (505.0/sq mi) in 2016.

== Notable people ==
- Willie Desjardins, former head coach of the Vancouver Canucks.
- Gord Kluzak, former NHL ice hockey player (1982-1991)
- Shaun Van Allen, former NHL hockey player (1991-2004)

== See also ==
- List of communities in Saskatchewan
- List of villages in Saskatchewan
