= Rural Municipality of Lone Tree No. 18 =

Rural municipality in Saskatchewan, Canada

Lone Tree No. 18
- Rural municipality
- Rural Municipality of Lone Tree No. 18

- Location of the RM of Lone Tree No. 18 in Saskatchewan
- Coordinates: 49.149°N 108.247°W
- Country: Canada
- Province: Saskatchewan
- Census division: 4
- SARM division: 3
- Federal riding: Cypress Hills--Grasslands
- Provincial riding: Wood River
- Formed: December 8, 1913

Government
  - Reeve: Roger Goodall
  - Governing body: RM of Lone Tree No. 18 Council
  - Administrator: Marla Shirley
  - Office location: Climax

Area (2016)
  - Land: 838 km^{2} (324 sq mi)

Population (2016)
  - Total: 150
  - Density: 0.2/km^{2} (0.52/sq mi)
- Time zone: CST
  - Summer (DST): CST
- Postal code: S0N 0N0
- Area codes: 306 and 639

The Rural Municipality of Lone Tree No. 18 (2016 population: 150) is a rural municipality (RM) in the Canadian province of Saskatchewan within Census Division No. 4 and SARM Division No. 3. Located in the southwest portion of the province, it is southwest of the city of Swift Current. It is adjacent to the United States border, neighbouring Blaine County and Phillips County in Montana.

== History ==
The RM of Lone Tree No. 18 incorporated as a rural municipality on December 8, 1913. It was named for Lonetree Lake, whose signature tree was chopped down in 1918. This name was once further rearranged to form Treelon, a post office which operated in the municipality until 1945.

== Geography ==
=== Communities and localities ===
The following urban municipalities are surrounded by the RM.

Villages

- Bracken
- Climax

The following unincorporated communities are within the RM.

Localities

- Canuck
- Treelon

== Demographics ==
Population history (1981–2016)
Year	Pop.	±%
1981	267	—
1986	249	−6.7%
1991	238	−4.4%
1996	203	−14.7%
2001	190	−6.4%
2006	150	−21.1%
2011	145	−3.3%
2016	150	+3.4%
Source: Statistics Canada via Saskatchewan Bureau of Statistics

In the 2021 Census of Population conducted by Statistics Canada, the RM of Lone Tree No. 18 had a population of 140 living in 55 of its 66 total private dwellings, a change of −6.7% from its 2016 population of 150. With a land area of 821.4 km^{2} (317.1 sq mi), it had a population density of 0.2/km^{2} (0.4/sq mi) in 2021.

In the 2016 Census of Population, the RM of Lone Tree No. 18 recorded a population of 150 living in 64 of its 77 total private dwellings, a 3.4% change from its 2011 population of 145. With a land area of 838 km^{2} (324 sq mi), it had a population density of 0.2/km^{2} (0.5/sq mi) in 2016.

== Government ==
The RM of Lone Tree No. 18 is governed by an elected municipal council and an appointed administrator that meets on the third Wednesday of every month. The reeve of the RM is Roger Goodall while its administrator is Marla Shirley. The RM's office is located in Climax.

== Transportation ==
Highway	Starting point	Communities	Ending point
Highway 18	Saskatchewan Highway 13	Canuck, Climax, Bracken	Manitoba Highway 3
Highway 37	Saskatchewan Highway 32	Climax	Port of Climax

== See also ==
- List of rural municipalities in Saskatchewan
