= McCord, Saskatchewan =

Community in Saskatchewan, Canada

Coordinates: 49°25′42″N 106°49′50″W

McCord is a hamlet in the Canadian province of Saskatchewan. It is situated about one mile south of Highway 18, between Ferland and Glentworth, in the south-central portion of the province.

McCord has a multi-purpose town hall, grocery store, greenhouse, a Co-Op with a small farming and hardware section, gas pumps, a town museum featuring historical and CPR Railway artifacts, small campground area, two churches, and an arena that previously housed hockey, skating, rodeos, and curling.

== Etymology ==
McCord is named after James Samuel (Jim) McCord, an early rancher who homesteaded at N36-5-8-W3.

== Demographics ==
In the 2021 Census of Population conducted by Statistics Canada, McCord had a population of 25 living in 16 of its 22 total private dwellings, a change of -16.7% from its 2016 population of 30. With a land area of 0.34 km^{2} (0.13 sq mi), it had a population density of 73.5/km^{2} (190.4/sq mi) in 2021.
