= Canuck, Saskatchewan =

Community in Saskatchewan, Canada

Canuck
- Unincorporated community
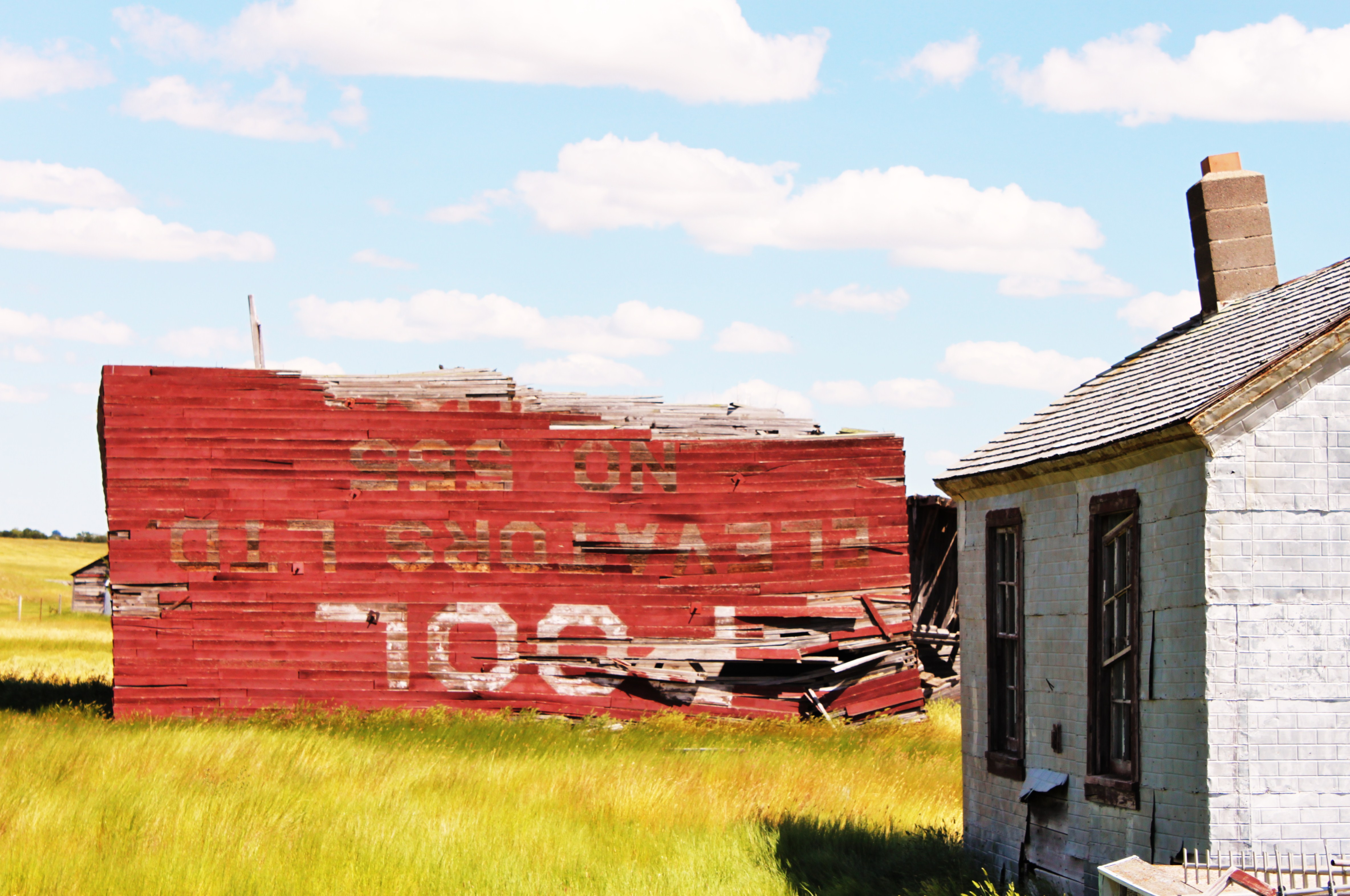
- The remains of the Saskatchewan Wheat Pool elevator in Canuck.

- Location within Lone Tree No. 18 Location within Saskatchewan
- Coordinates: 49.2001°N 108.2258°W
- Country: Canada
- Province: Saskatchewan
- Region: Southwest Saskatchewan
- Rural municipality: Lone Tree No. 18

Government
  - Governing body: Lone Tree No. 18
  - Reeve: Larry Jarman
  - Administrator: Shawna Lee Bertram
  - MLA: Dave Marit
  - MP: Jeremy Patzer

Area
  - Total: 0.00 km^{2} (0 sq mi)

Population (2016)
  - Total: 0
  - Density: 0/km^{2} (0/sq mi)
- Time zone: CST
- Postal code: S0N 0N0
- Area code: 306
- Highways: Highway 18
- Railways: Canadian Pacific Railway

Canuck is an unincorporated community within the Rural Municipality of Lone Tree No. 18, Saskatchewan, Canada. It is on Highway 18, 12.5 kilometres (7.8 mi) east of the village of Climax.

== History ==
Canuck was once a booming community, with a few small businesses and storefronts along the main street, three grain elevators that have all been demolished, and a small schoolhouse that has also been demolished. Since the late 1930s Canuck's population dwindled and the community is now completely abandoned.

== Demographics ==
In 2006, Canuck had a population of 0 living in 0 dwellings, a 0% increase from 2001. The community had a land area of 0.00 km^{2} (0 sq mi) and a population density of 0.0/km^{2} (0/sq mi).

== See also ==
- List of communities in Saskatchewan
- List of ghost towns in Saskatchewan
