= Bracken, Saskatchewan =

Village in Saskatchewan, Canada

Bracken
- Village
- Village of Bracken
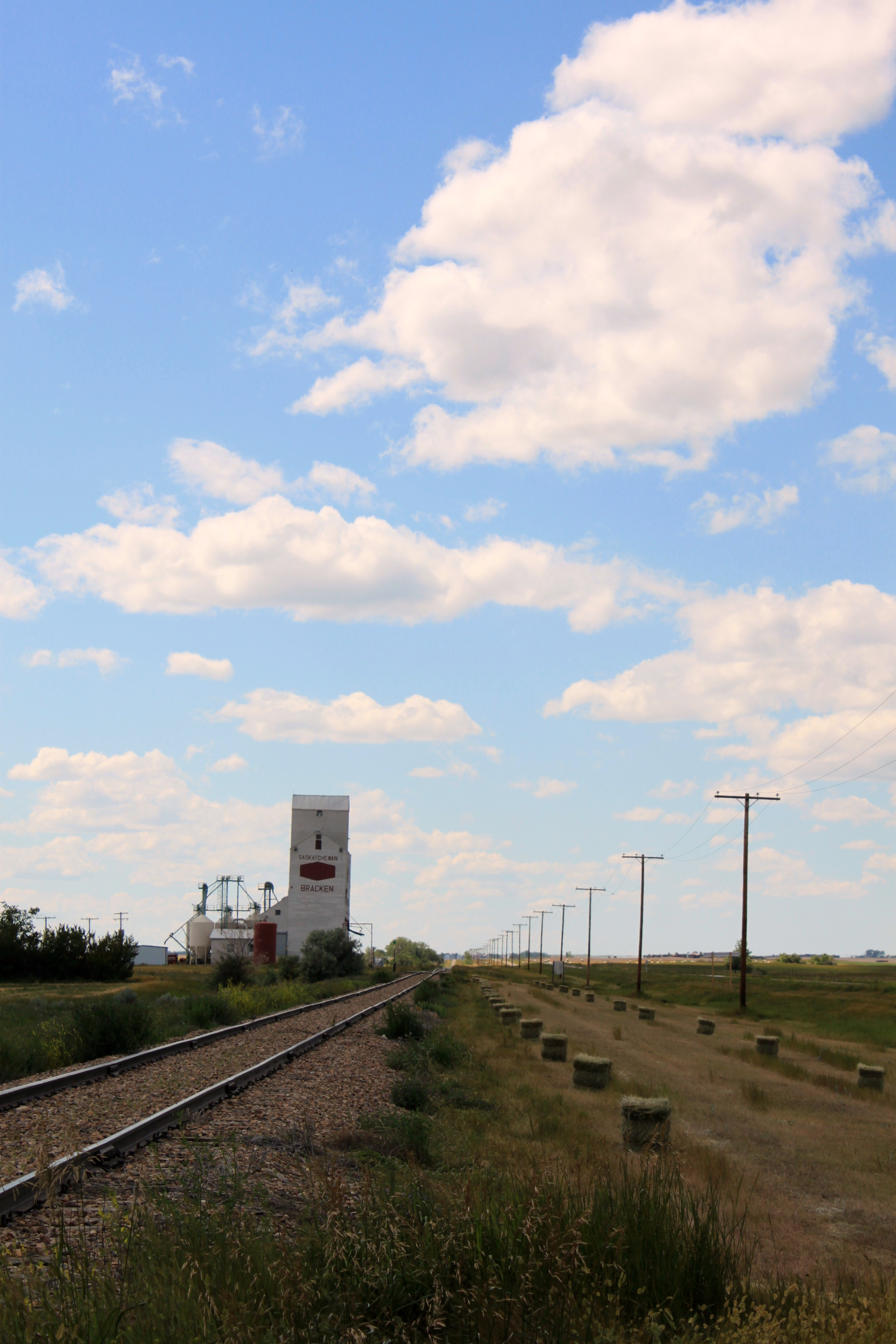
- Looking down railway tracks towards the grain elevator in Bracken.

- Location within Lone Tree No. 18 Location within Saskatchewan
- Coordinates: 49.1795°N 108.094°W
- Country: Canada
- Province: Saskatchewan
- Region: Southwest
- Rural municipality: Lone Tree No. 18

Government
  - Type: Municipal
  - Governing body: Bracken Village Council
  - Mayor: Steve Dueck
  - Administrator: Monique Fehr
  - MLA: Dave Marit
  - MP: Jeremy Patzer

Area
  - Total: 0.60 km^{2} (0.23 sq mi)

Population (2016)
  - Total: 25
  - Density: 33.5/km^{2} (87/sq mi)
- Time zone: UTC-6 (CST)
- Postal code: S0N 0G0
- Area code: 306
- Highways: Highway 18
- Railway: Great Western Railway

Bracken (2016 population: 20) is a village in the Canadian province of Saskatchewan within the Rural Municipality of Lone Tree No. 18 and Census Division No. 4. The village is named after John Bracken, Premier of Manitoba and leader of the Progressive Conservative Party of Canada, who was a professor at the University of Saskatchewan. The small village is located approximately 160 km south of the city of Swift Current on Highway 18, directly north of Grasslands National Park, and approximately 20 km north of the Montana–Saskatchewan border.

== History ==
Bracken incorporated as a village on January 4, 1926.

== Demographics ==
Population history (1981–2016)
Year	Pop.	±%
1981	66	—
1986	54	−18.2%
1991	48	−11.1%
1996	56	+16.7%
2001	35	−37.5%
2006	25	−28.6%
2011	30	+20.0%
2016	20	−33.3%
Source: Statistics Canada via Saskatchewan Bureau of Statistics

In the 2021 Census of Population conducted by Statistics Canada, Bracken had a population of 20 living in 11 of its 14 total private dwellings, a change of 0% from its 2016 population of 20. With a land area of 0.63 km^{2} (0.24 sq mi), it had a population density of 31.7/km^{2} (82.2/sq mi) in 2021.

In the 2016 Census of Population, the Village of Bracken recorded a population of 20 living in 9 of its 13 total private dwellings, a −50% change from its 2011 population of 30. With a land area of 0.6 km^{2} (0.23 sq mi), it had a population density of 33.3/km^{2} (86.3/sq mi) in 2016.

== Education ==
Students in Bracken are bused to Frontier, which has a school that covers kindergarten through grade 12 in the Chinook School Division.

== See also ==
- List of communities in Saskatchewan
- List of villages in Saskatchewan
