= Rosefield, Saskatchewan =

Rosefield
- Unincorporated community
- Location within Saskatchewan
- Coordinates: 49.0833°N 107.5339°W
- Country: Canada
- Province: Saskatchewan
- Region: Southwest
- Census division: 4
- Rural Municipality: Val Marie

Government
  - Reeve: Mike Waldner
  - Administrator: Cathy Legault
  - Governing body: Val Marie No. 17

Population (2006)
  - Total: 16
- Time zone: CST
- Postal code: S0N 2T0
- Area code: 306

Rosefield is an unincorporated community within the Rural Municipality of Val Marie No. 17, Saskatchewan, Canada. The community is located about 25 km south of Val Marie bordering Grasslands National Park. Rosefield - as it is known to the people, is home to individuals, couples and families who ranch, farm or work in tourism and other business operations.

== Demographics ==
In 2006, Rosefield had a population of 16 living in 9 dwellings, a 30% increase from 2001.

== See also ==
- List of communities in Saskatchewan
