= Rural Municipality of Val Marie No. 17 =

Rural municipality in Saskatchewan, Canada

Val Marie No. 17
- Rural municipality
- Rural Municipality of Val Marie No. 17
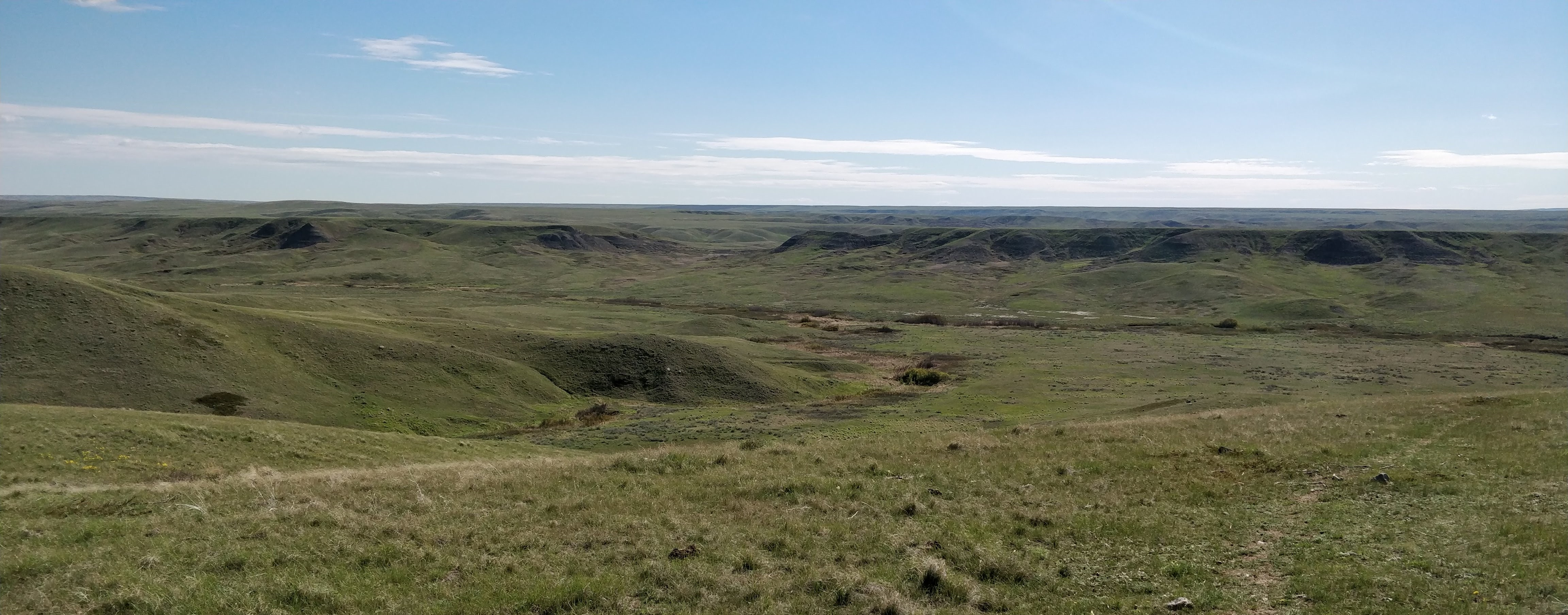
- West Block of Grasslands National Park

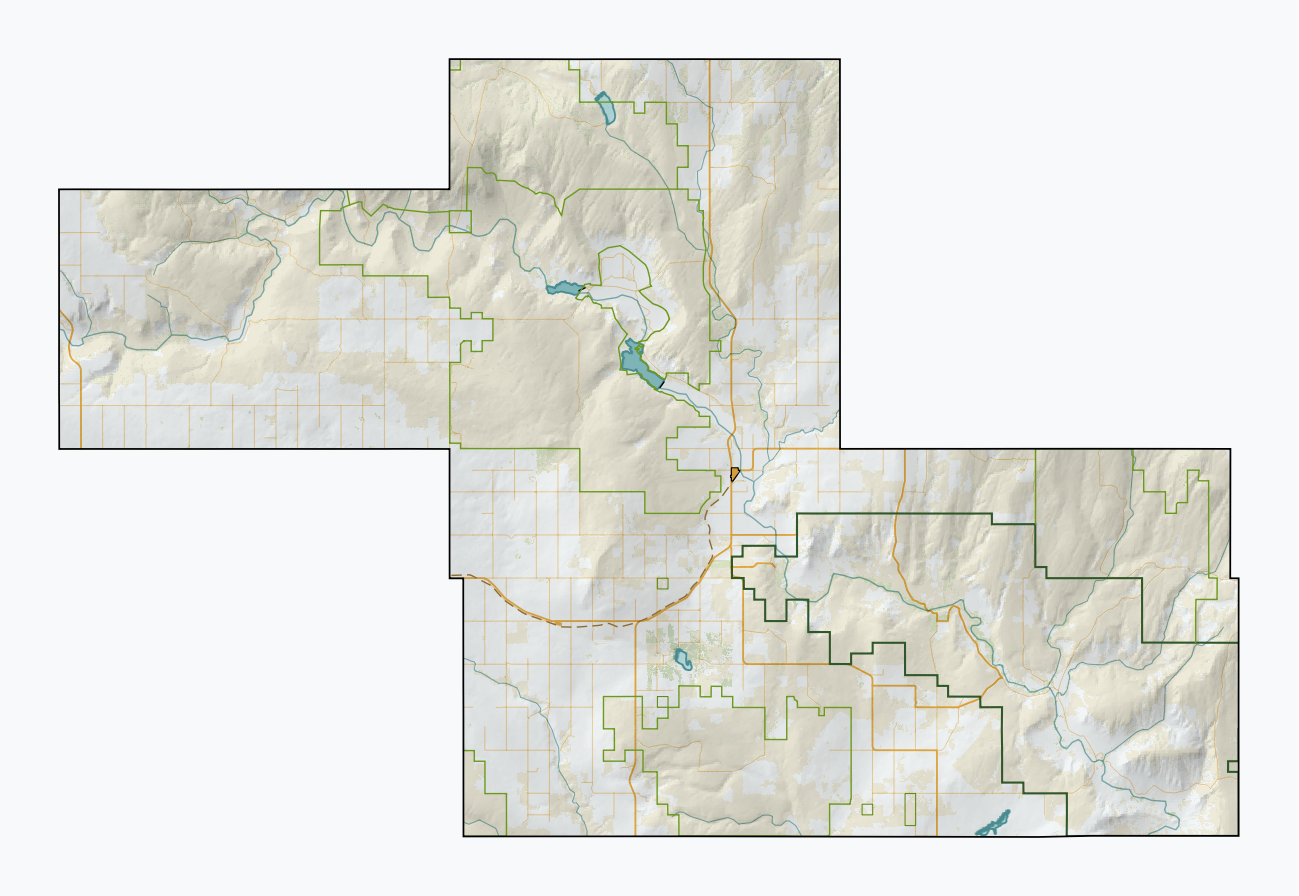

- Location of the RM of Val Marie No. 17 in Saskatchewan
- Coordinates: 49.226°N 107.717°W
- Country: Canada
- Province: Saskatchewan
- Census division: 4
- SARM division: 3
- Formed: January 1, 1969
- Office location: Val Marie

Government
  - Body: R.M. Council
  - Reeve: Larry Grant
  - Council: Clinton Rapley; Timothy B. Christianson; Ervin E. Carlier; Shadrick Peno; Greg Kornfeld
  - Administrator: Cathy Legault
  - MLA: Dave Marit
  - MP: Jeremy Patzer

Area (2021)
  - Land: 3,059.22 km^{2} (1,181.17 sq mi)

Population (2021)
  - Total: 425
  - Density: 0.1/km^{2} (0.26/sq mi)
- Time zone: CST
  - Summer (DST): CST
- Postal code: S0N 2T0
- Area codes: 306 and 639

The Rural Municipality of Val Marie No. 17 (2021 population: 425) is a rural municipality (RM) in the Canadian province of Saskatchewan within Census Division No. 4 and SARM Division No. 3. Located in the southwest portion of the province, it is adjacent to the Canada–United States border, neighbouring Phillips County in Montana.

== History ==
The RM of Val Marie No. 17 incorporated as a rural municipality on January 1, 1969. Louis-Pierre Gravel, missionary and promoter of much French Catholic immigration to southwestern Saskatchewan, originally called the settlement Rivière des Français after the nearby Frenchman River. But for an unknown reason, in a 1911 report to the superintendent of immigration, his formally proposed name became Libreval ("Free Valley"). Ultimately, neither of Gravel's suggestions was used, and Val Marie ("Valley of Mary"), was coined by Fr. Claude Passaplan, missionary priest in the area. Before coming to Val Marie, Passaplan served as the first Roman Catholic parish priest in Swift Current.

== Geography ==
=== Communities and localities ===
The RM surrounds one urban municipality, the eponymous village of Val Marie. Both communities share an office and an administrator.

Villages

- Val Marie

Hutterite colonies

- Sand Lake Colony
- Butte Colony

Unorganized hamlets

- Orkney

Localities

- Beaver Valley
- Gergovia
- Hillandale
- Masefield
- Monchy
- Roche Plain
- Rosefield

== Demographics ==
Population history (1971–2021)
Year	Pop.	±%
1971	822	—
1976	722	−12.2%
1981	641	−11.2%
1986	620	−3.3%
1991	531	−14.4%
1996	523	−1.5%
2001	481	−8.0%
2006	479	−0.4%
2011	405	−15.4%
2016	413	+2.0%
2021	425	+2.9%
Source: Statistics Canada via Saskatchewan Bureau of Statistics

In the 2021 Census of Population conducted by Statistics Canada, the RM of Val Marie No. 17 had a population of 425 living in 99 of its 115 total private dwellings, a change of 2.9% from its 2016 population of 413. With a land area of 3,059.22 km^{2} (1,181.17 sq mi), it had a population density of 0.1/km^{2} (0.4/sq mi) in 2021.

In the 2016 Census of Population, the RM of Val Marie No. 17 recorded a population of 413 living in 97 of its 114 total private dwellings, a −1.7% change from its 2011 population of 420. With a land area of 3,105.26 km^{2} (1,198.95 sq mi), it had a population density of 0.1/km^{2} (0.3/sq mi) in 2016.

== Economy ==
Due to its semi-arid climate, Val Marie is a mixed district where ranching and crop agriculture are both practiced. Much of the RM is occupied by large community pastures. The Val Marie Irrigation Project controls two artificial lakes on the Frenchman River, which are used to operate a drip irrigation system in the region adjacent to the village.

The creation of Grasslands National Park in 1981 has bolstered the region's tourism sector, and the RM is home to two guesthouses, as well as the park's operations compound.

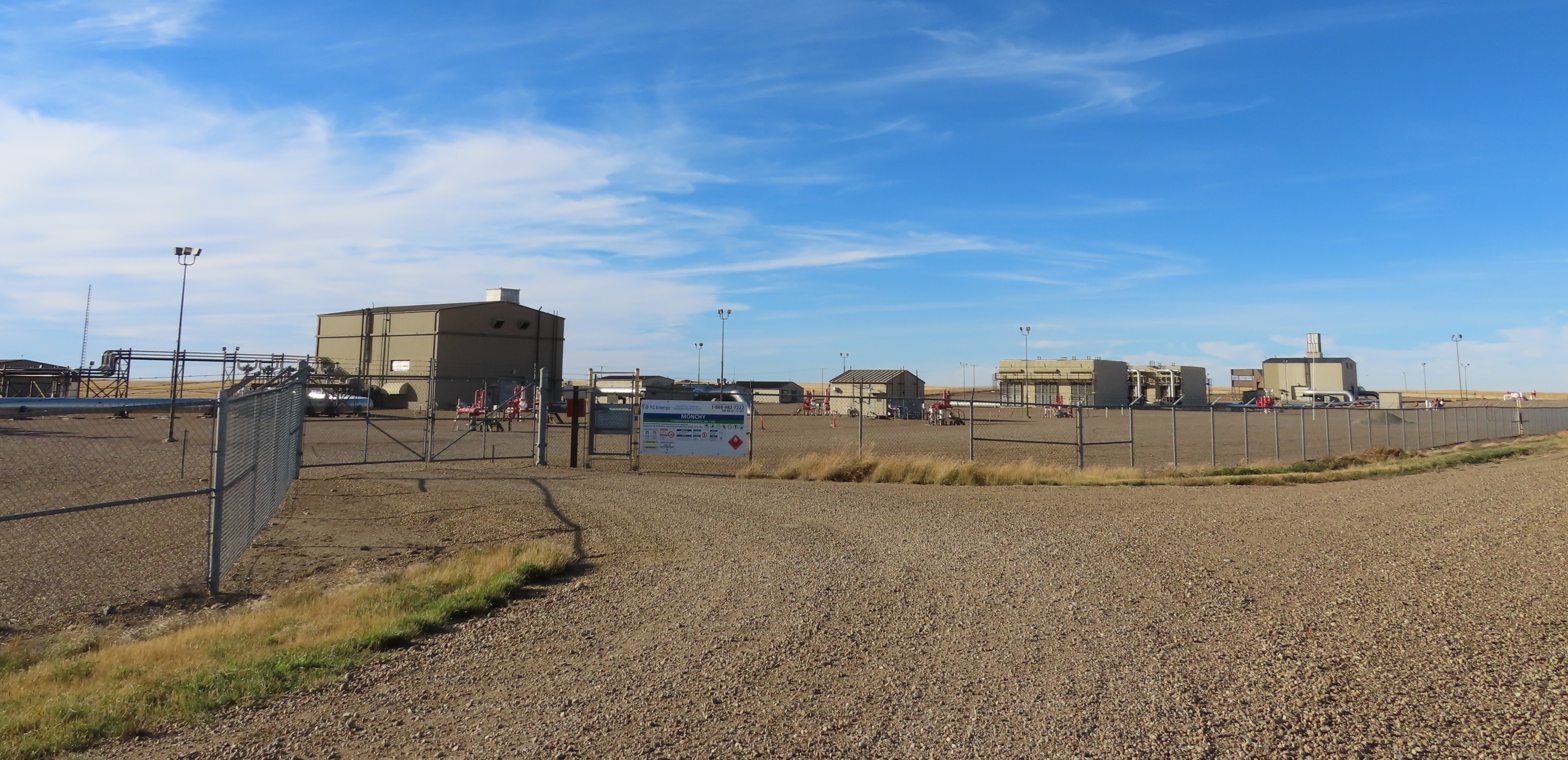
The Monchy compressor station

Although there are no oil wells in the vicinity of Val Marie, the RM is transited by a major pipeline, and the Monchy Compressor Station sits directly on the Canada–United States border.

== Attractions ==
The RM includes the western portion (or "West Block") of Grasslands National Park.

== Government ==
The RM of Val Marie No. 17 is governed by an elected municipal council and an appointed administrator that meets on the second Tuesday of every month. The reeve of the RM is Larry Grant while its administrator is Cathy Legault. The RM's office is located in Val Marie.

== Transportation ==
- Highway 18—serves Val Marie, Saskatchewan and Orkney, Saskatchewan
- Highway 4—serves Val Marie, Saskatchewan

== See also ==
- List of rural municipalities in Saskatchewan
