= Ferland, Saskatchewan =

Hamlet in Saskatchewan, Canada

Ferland
- Unincorporated community
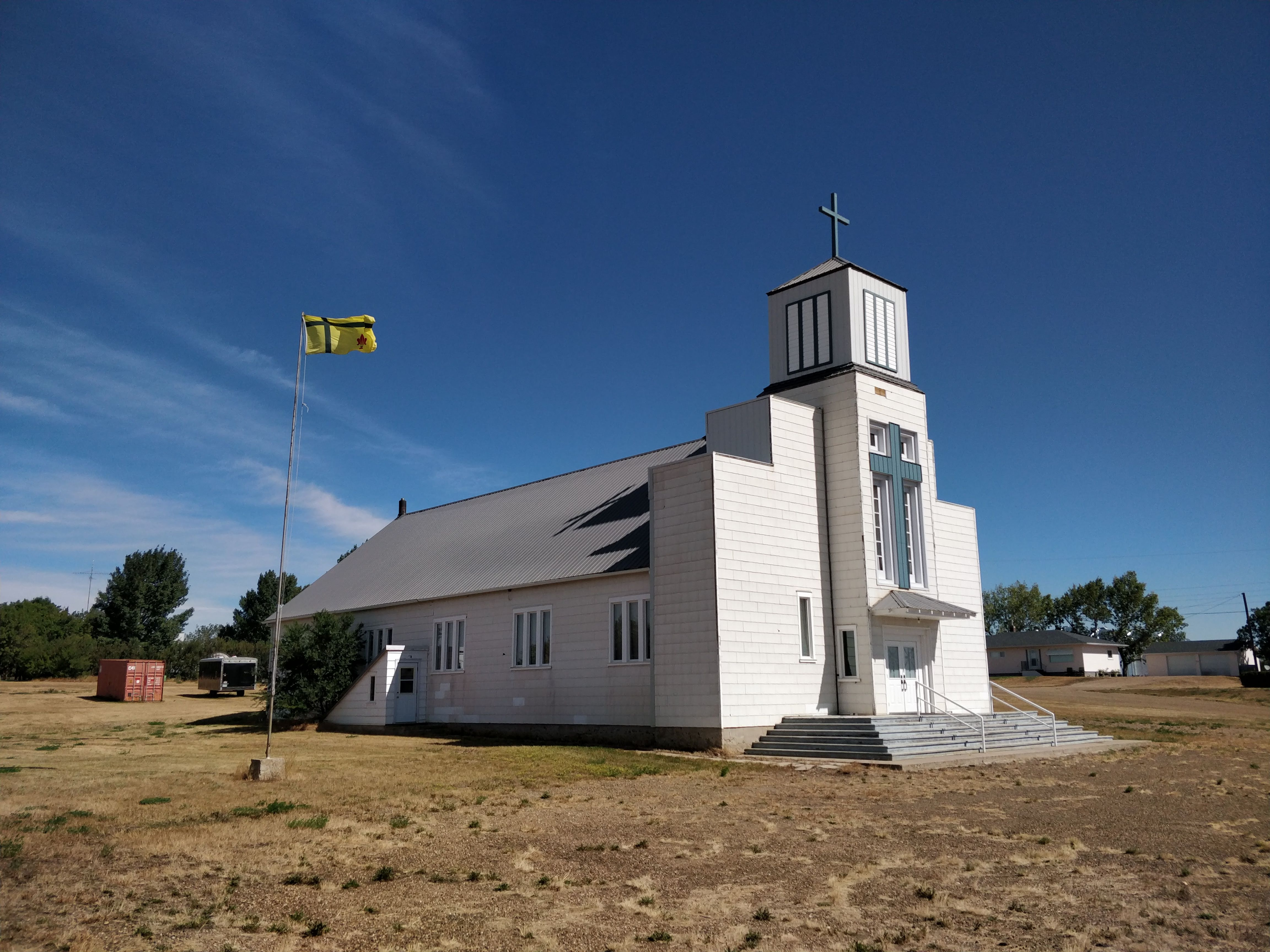
- Fransaskois flag flying outside church

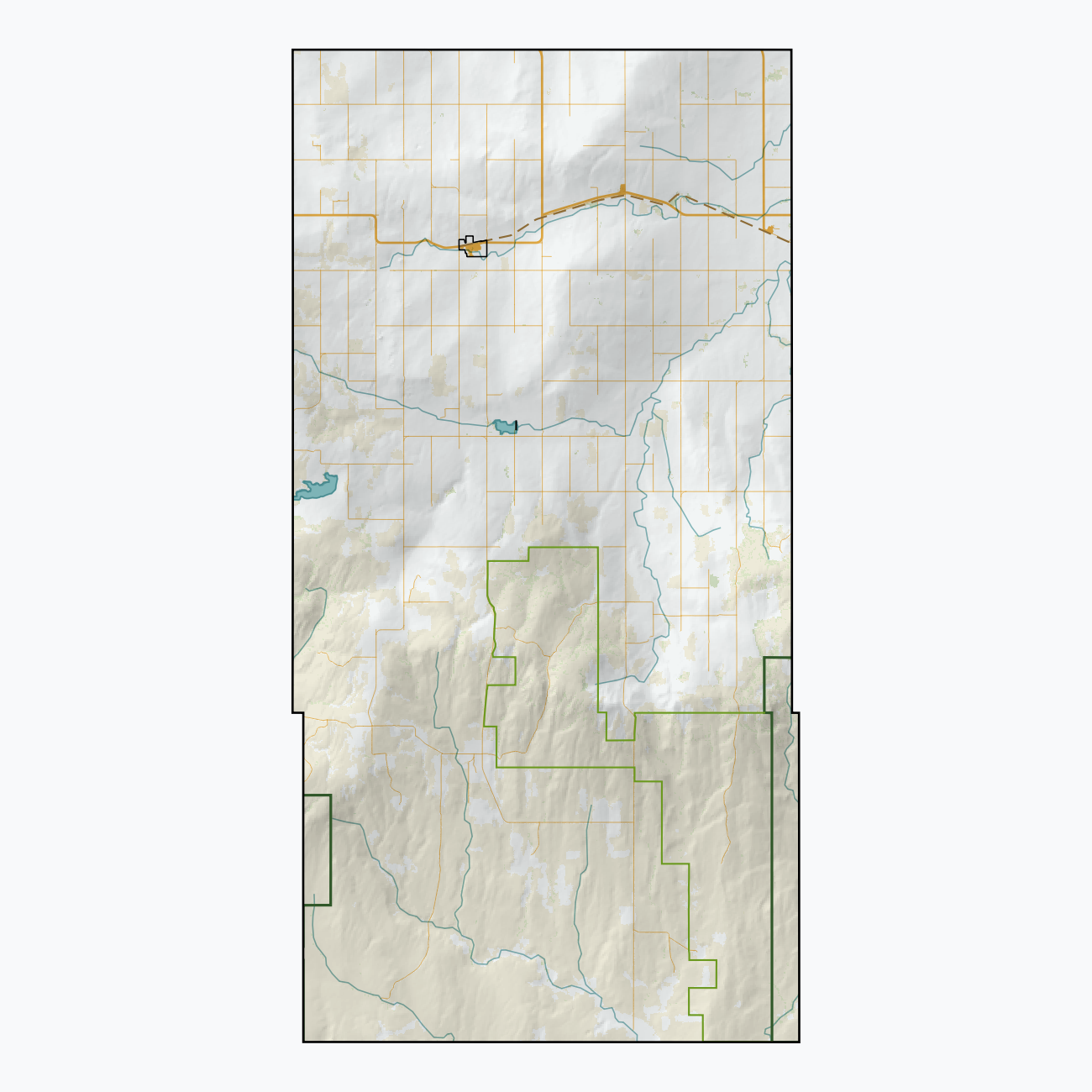
- Location within Mankota No. 45 Location within Saskatchewan
- Coordinates: 49.450°N 106.951°W
- Country: Canada
- Province: Saskatchewan
- Rural municipality: Mankota No. 45
- Time zone: CST
- Area code: 306

Ferland is a fransaskois hamlet in the Rural Municipality of Mankota No. 45, Saskatchewan, Canada. It previously held the status of village until November 4, 1988. The hamlet is located 10 km east of the village of Mankota on Highway 18.

== Demographics ==
Prior to November 4, 1988, Ferland was incorporated as a village, and was restructured as a hamlet under the jurisdiction of the Rural Municipality of Mankota No. 45 on that date.

In 2012, the government recognised the significant influence the francophone population had in Ferland's history, and so permanently installed a fransaskois flag in the hamlet.

== Infrastructure ==
- Ferland Airport

== See also ==
- List of communities in Saskatchewan
- List of hamlets in Saskatchewan
