= Mankota =

Village in Saskatchewan, Canada

- Village
- Village of Mankota
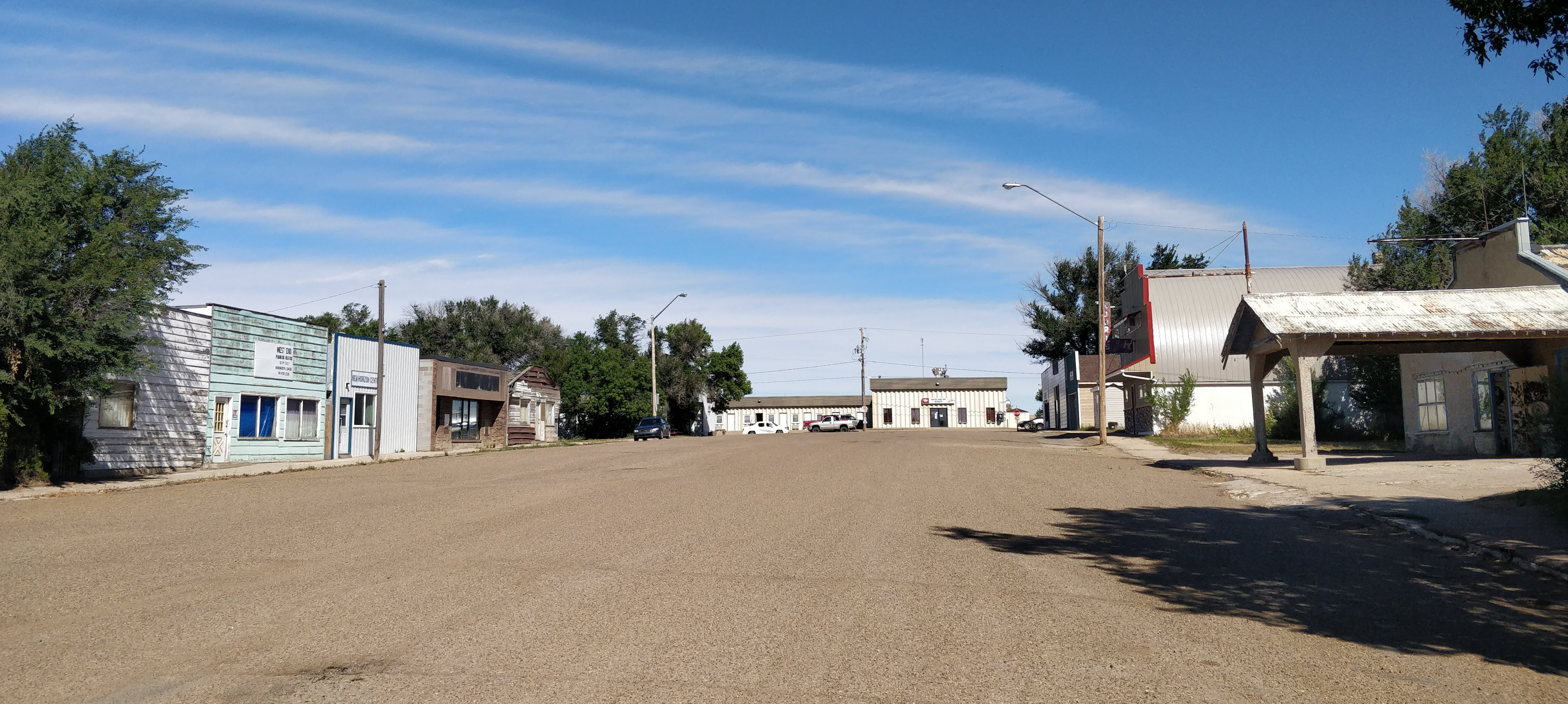
- Businesses on 3rd Street West

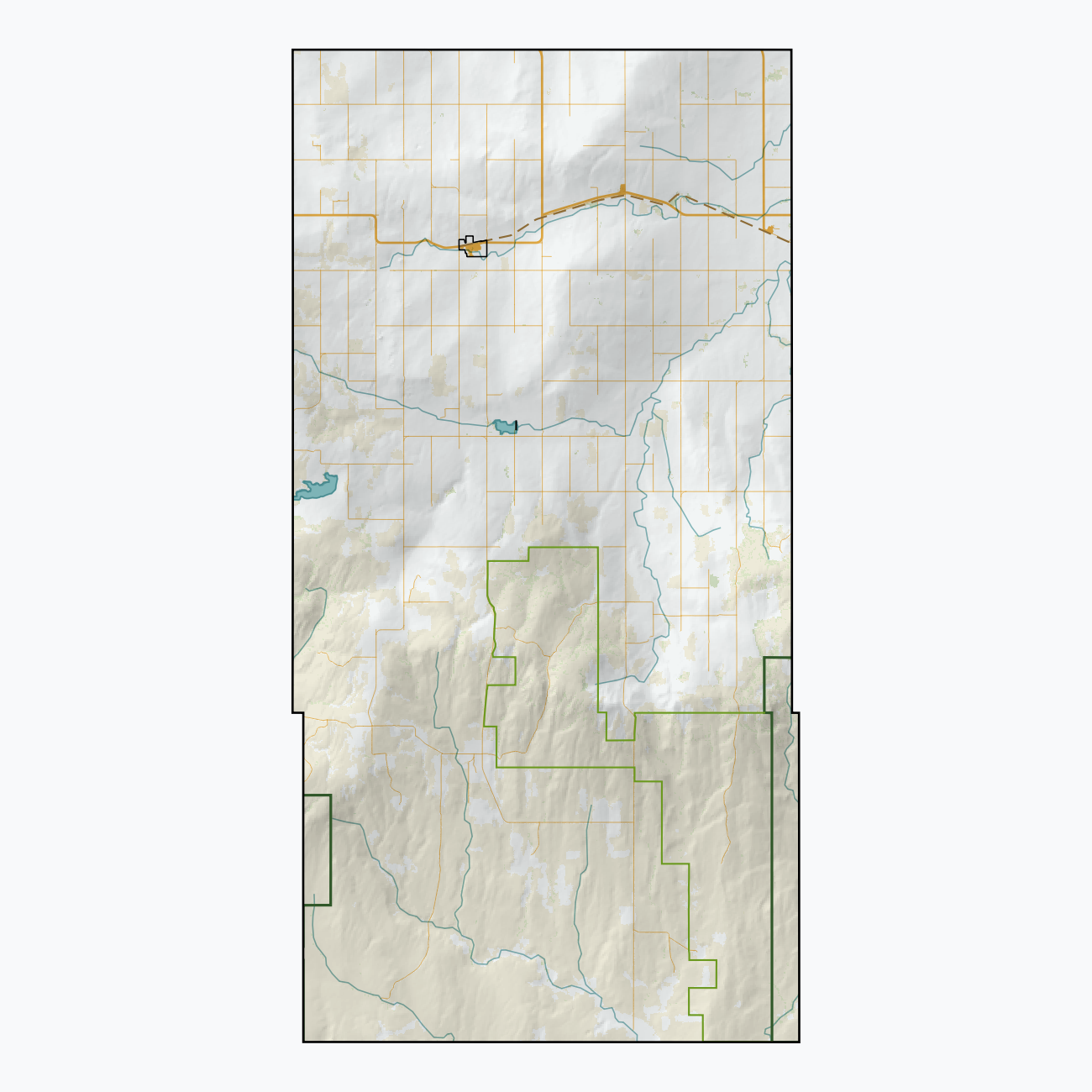
- Location within Mankota No. 45 Location within Saskatchewan Location within Canada
- Coordinates: 49.421°N 107.070°W
- Country: Canada
- Province: Saskatchewan
- Region: Saskatchewan
- Census division: No. 3
- Rural Municipality: Mankota
- Post office Founded: 1911
- Village Incorporated: N/A
- Town Incorporated: N/A

Government
  - Mayor: Vince Hannah
  - Administrator: April Williamson

Area
  - Total: 1.55 km^{2} (0.60 sq mi)

Population (2011)
  - Total: 211
  - Density: 153.3/km^{2} (397/sq mi)
- Time zone: CST
- Postal code: S0H 2W0
- Area code: 306
- Highways: Highway 18; Highway 19

Mankota (2021 population: 198) is a village in the Canadian province of Saskatchewan within the Rural Municipality of Mankota No. 45 and Census Division No. 3. The village is located on Highway 18, about 150 kilometres (93 mi) southeast of the city of Swift Current.

== History ==
The community acquired a post office in 1911 and was named by combining Manitoba and North Dakota, the original homes of many of its initial settlers. Mankota incorporated as a village on February 3, 1941.

== Demographics ==
Population history (1981–2016)
Year	Pop.	±%
1981	375	—
1986	394	+5.1%
1991	381	−3.3%
1996	326	−14.4%
2001	248	−23.9%
2006	238	−4.0%
2011	211	−11.3%
2016	205	−2.8%
Source: Statistics Canada via Saskatchewan Bureau of Statistics

In the 2021 Census of Population conducted by Statistics Canada, Mankota had a population of 198 living in 108 of its 133 total private dwellings, a change of −3.4% from its 2016 population of 205. With a land area of 1.5 km^{2} (0.58 sq mi), it had a population density of 132.0/km^{2} (341.9/sq mi) in 2021.

In the 2016 Census of Population, the Village of Mankota recorded a population of 205 living in 107 of its 137 total private dwellings, a −2.9% change from its 2011 population of 211. With a land area of 1.42 km^{2} (0.55 sq mi), it had a population density of 144.4/km^{2} (373.9/sq mi) in 2016.

== Economy and businesses ==
Mankota has a stockyard for the sale of cattle from many farms in the area. Other businesses include an inn, motel/restaurant, general store, Credit Union, clinic/old folks home, bowling alley, town hall, library, fire station, community centre, auto repair shop, gas station, and a Canada Post office.

In 2016, Weil Group Resources of Dallas constructed a $10 million helium processing facility near Mankota to supply refined, industrial-grade helium gas to world markets, reviving a mineral resource which was previously established in Saskatchewan.

== Education ==
Mankota has one school that covers Kindergarten through Grade 12 in the Prairie South School Division. Enrollment for the 2008–2009 year was at 78, declining to 61 in 2011, and declining further every year on average.

There are 40 students enrolled for the 2022-23 school year, seven of which are in Grade 12.

== Climate ==
Climate data for Mankota
Month	Jan	Feb	Mar	Apr	May	Jun	Jul	Aug	Sep	Oct	Nov	Dec	Year
Record high °C (°F)	12.8 (55.0)	18 (64)	23 (73)	30.5 (86.9)	37 (99)	41 (106)	38 (100)	39.5 (103.1)	36 (97)	33 (91)	21.7 (71.1)	12.8 (55.0)	41 (106)
Mean daily maximum °C (°F)	−7.3 (18.9)	−3.7 (25.3)	3.1 (37.6)	12 (54)	18.6 (65.5)	22.9 (73.2)	26.8 (80.2)	26.7 (80.1)	19.9 (67.8)	12.8 (55.0)	1.3 (34.3)	−5.3 (22.5)	10.6 (51.1)
Daily mean °C (°F)	−13.6 (7.5)	−9.8 (14.4)	−3.1 (26.4)	4.7 (40.5)	11 (52)	15.4 (59.7)	18.5 (65.3)	17.9 (64.2)	11.5 (52.7)	4.9 (40.8)	−5.1 (22.8)	−11.6 (11.1)	3.4 (38.1)
Mean daily minimum °C (°F)	−19.8 (−3.6)	−15.9 (3.4)	−9.4 (15.1)	−2.6 (27.3)	3.3 (37.9)	7.8 (46.0)	10.1 (50.2)	9.1 (48.4)	3.1 (37.6)	−3 (27)	−11.3 (11.7)	−17.7 (0.1)	−3.9 (25.0)
Record low °C (°F)	−43.3 (−45.9)	−40 (−40)	−33 (−27)	−28.3 (−18.9)	−15 (5)	−5 (23)	0.6 (33.1)	−2.2 (28.0)	−14 (7)	−28 (−18)	−38.5 (−37.3)	−42.8 (−45.0)	−43.3 (−45.9)
Average precipitation mm (inches)	17.6 (0.69)	14.5 (0.57)	17.5 (0.69)	20.8 (0.82)	56.9 (2.24)	58.2 (2.29)	53 (2.1)	29 (1.1)	26.6 (1.05)	15.2 (0.60)	16 (0.6)	15.1 (0.59)	340.4 (13.40)
Source: Environment Canada

== Attractions ==
- Grasslands National Park, one of Canada's newer national parks and is located in southern Saskatchewan along the Montana border.
- Cypress Hills Interprovincial Park, straddling the Alberta-Saskatchewan border southeast of Medicine Hat, is Canada's only interprovincial park.
- Mankota Stockyards, has cow sales every Friday all year long.
- The Mankota Rodeo is held in May every year.

== Notable people ==
- Dave Rodney, Member of the Legislative Assembly of Alberta for Calgary-Lougheed, November 22, 2004 – November 1, 2017

== See also ==
- List of francophone communities in Saskatchewan
- List of villages in Saskatchewan
- List of geographic names derived from portmanteaus
