= Val Marie =

Village in Saskatchewan, Canada

- Village
- Village of Val Marie
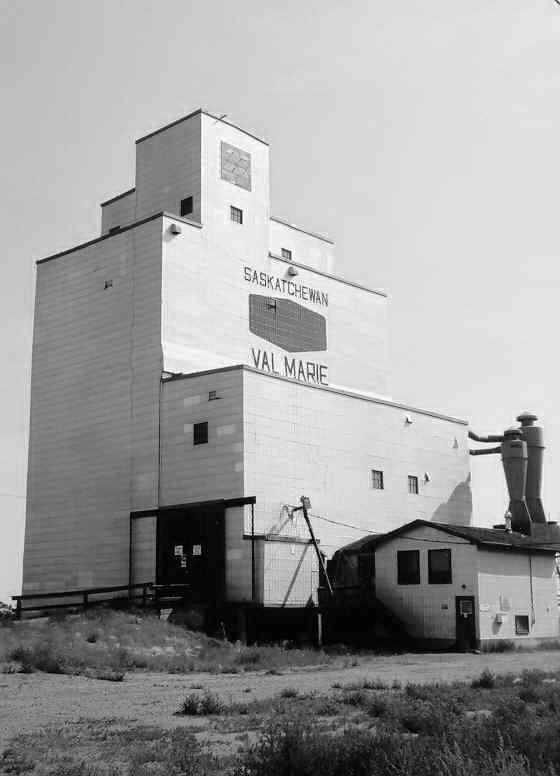
- Val Marie grain elevator

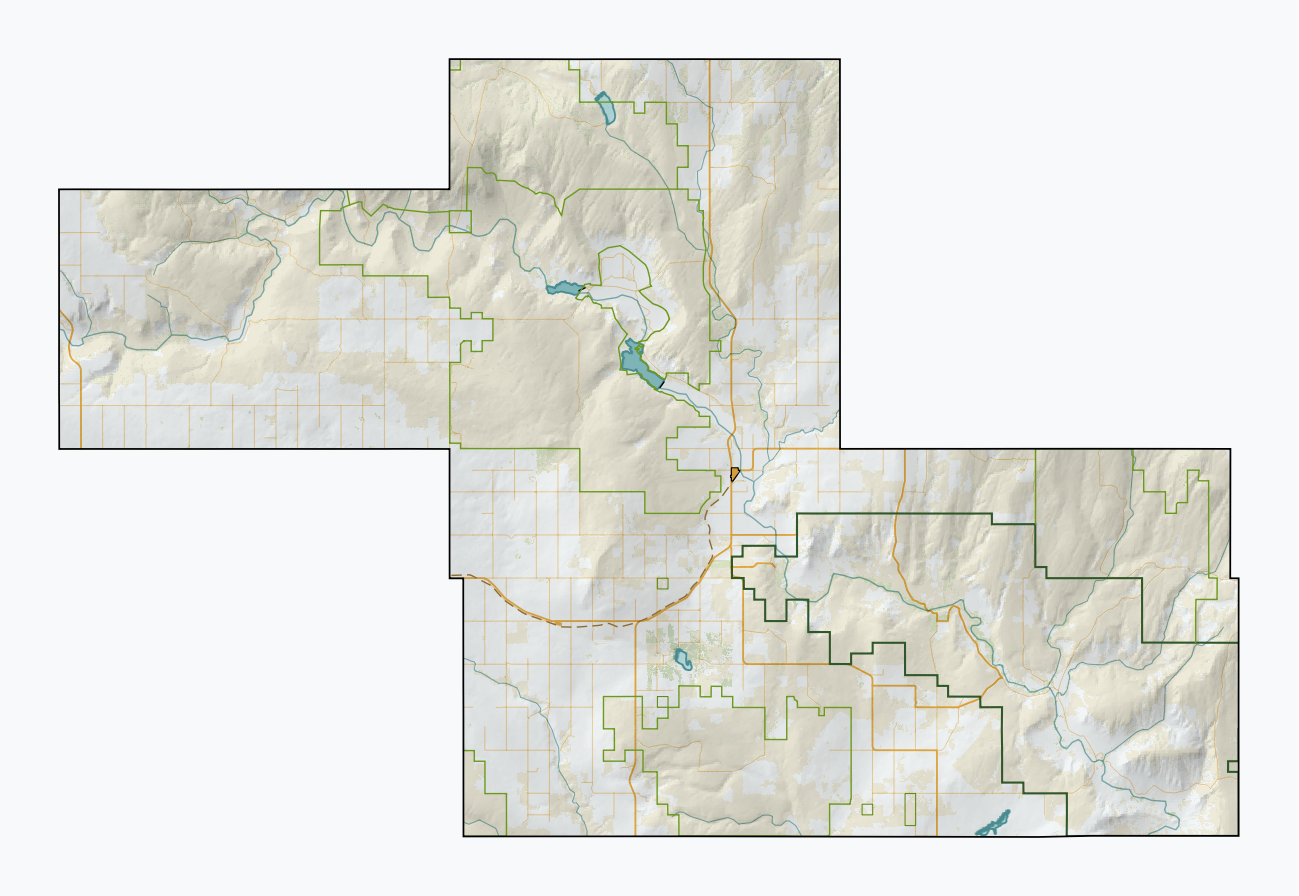
- Val Marie Val Marie (Saskatchewan) Val Marie (Canada)
- Coordinates: 49°14′44″N 107°43′45″W
- Country: Canada
- Province: Saskatchewan
- Census division: 4
- Rural municipality: Val Marie No. 17

Government
  - Mayor: Roland Facette
  - Council: John Reynolds; Rene Perrault; Jacques Beauchamp; Glenn Baxter
  - Administrator: Cathy Legault
  - Member of Parliament: Jeremy Patzer
  - Member of the Legislative Assembly: Dave Marit
- Elevation: 795 m (2,608 ft)

Population (2021)
  - Total: 120
- Time zone: CST
- Postal code: S0N 2T0
- Area code: 306
- Climate: BSk
- Highways: Highway 18; Highway 4

Val Marie (2021 population: 120) is a village in the Canadian province of Saskatchewan within the Rural Municipality of Val Marie No. 17 and Census Division 4. It is about 31 kilometres (19 mi) from the Canada–United States border.

Considered the gateway to the Grasslands National Park, Val Marie's economy is largely based on wheat farming, ranching, and tourism. Some natural gas has been found nearby. Employment includes agriculture, federal government (Grasslands National Park and Canadian Border Services), tourism (hotel and accommodation, restaurant, retail, etc) and a significant natural gas compressor relay station at the Montana border.

== Etymology ==
Fr. Louis-Pierre Gravel, missionary and promoter of much French Catholic immigration to southwestern Saskatchewan, originally called this settlement Rivière des Français after the nearby Frenchman River. For an unknown reason, he proposed a different name in a 1911 report to the superintendent of immigration: Libreval ("Free Valley"). Ultimately, neither of Gravel's suggestions were used, and Val Marie ("Valley of Mary"), was coined by Fr. Claude Passaplan, missionary priest in the area. Before coming to Val Marie, Passaplan served as the first Roman Catholic parish priest in Swift Current.

== History ==
The first European investigation of the area was conducted by the Palliser Expedition (1857–1859), supported by the Royal Geographical Society and the British Government, and led by John Palliser, a wealthy Irish landowner. He was accompanied by geologist James Hector, and various cartographers and botanists. They studied the natural resources and agricultural potential of the Palliser area — including Val Marie — and reported the place as dismally dry, prone to drought, and unfit for habitation. The dismissive conclusions slowed settlement in the area for decades.

Artifacts of native civilization are significant. In 1877, Tatanka Iyotake Sitting Bull crossed from the USA into Canada along the Frenchman River (which flows through Val Marie) after his victory over General Custer at Battle of the Little Bighorn.

The community of Val Marie – Valley of Mary – was founded in 1910 by Father Passaplan, Louis Denniel, and the brothers François and Léon Pinel. Most of the early settlers were ranchers and farmers from Quebec and France. Val Marie was incorporated as a village on September 13, 1926. By 1939, two irrigation reservoirs were built near Val Marie by the PFRA (Prairie Farm Rehabilitation Agency) in coordination with Ducks Unlimited. Over 10,000 acres (4,000 ha) are irrigated through the system which provides some stabilization through droughts that plague the area.

Originally settled by French ranchers, the village remained largely ethnically French and by the 1950s had 450 people. Amenities then included three gasoline stations, a hospital, convent, bakery, bank, and several cafes and stores. The population declined significantly with low grain commodity prices and droughts in the 1980s. English is now universally spoken as the last unilingual Francophone resident died in 1981. The Grasslands National Park has attracted some new people into the area; full-time and seasonal employees for the park, as well as recent retirees now call Val Marie home.

On August 14, 2004, Grasslands – Where Heaven Meets Earth, a site-specific art performance, was held in the community and park. The event was a collaboration of Canadian artists including Bill Coleman, Edward Poitras, Gordon Monahan, and Margie Gillis.

== Geography ==
=== Grasslands National Park ===
The West Block of Grasslands National Park lies 10 kilometres (6.2 mi) east of Val Marie. The park is the only place in Canada where black-tailed prairie dog colonies are found. In 2006, plains bison were re-introduced into the park. Hiking in the badlands and viewing wildlife in the park are primary visiting activities. The park is divided into two blocks. The West Block is closest to Val Marie and the East Block is near Killdeer. There are no plans to connect the two blocks. It protects the Frenchman River Valley and is home to many unique species in Canada such as plains bison, prairie rattlesnake, black-tailed prairie dogs, burrowing owls, swift fox, and many more. An official Parks Canada information centre is located in the town of Val Marie.

The park is home to over 12,000 teepee rings, indicating that the land was heavily used by indigenous people before it was used by cattle ranchers and homesteading. Primarily the Plains Cree and the Assiniboine used the land to hunt bison. The large 76 Ranch once had an office and many sections of land in the Val Marie area.

=== Climate ===
Located within Palliser's Triangle, Val Marie has a semi-arid climate (Köppen climate classification BSk). Val Marie has a weather station with daily records since 1937. It can be a harsh climate, cold and windswept in the winter and often very dry for prolonged periods, broken sometimes by extremely intense rainfalls during the summer. Val Marie is sometimes the national hotspot in Canada on a given summer day. Val Marie gets more days of sunlight per year than anywhere else in Canada. On average, Val Marie receives 352.5 mm (13.88 in) of precipitation per year and about two thirds of that is snow.

The coldest temperature ever recorded in Val Marie is −49.4 °C (−56.9 °F) on January 20, 1954. The hottest is 41.1 °C (106.0 °F) on July 4, 1937, which came close to being broken on July 23, 2007, when the temperature rose to 40.6 °C (105.1 °F), and again on August 11, 2018, when the temperature rose to 40.9 °C (105.6 °F). The preceding day, August 10, saw a maximum of 40.0 °C (104.0 °F).

The record one-day rainfall is 86.4 mm (3.40 in) on July 3, 2000. The record one-day snowfall is 45.7 cm (18.0 in) April 2, 1940.

Climate data for Val-Marie (1981–2010)
Month	Jan	Feb	Mar	Apr	May	Jun	Jul	Aug	Sep	Oct	Nov	Dec	Year
Record high °C (°F)	13.0 (55.4)	19.0 (66.2)	23.0 (73.4)	31.7 (89.1)	36.0 (96.8)	38.5 (101.3)	41.1 (106.0)	40.9 (105.6)	38.9 (102.0)	30.6 (87.1)	24.0 (75.2)	17.8 (64.0)	41.1 (106.0)
Mean daily maximum °C (°F)	−4.3 (24.3)	−1.7 (28.9)	3.6 (38.5)	12.3 (54.1)	18.1 (64.6)	22.8 (73.0)	26.7 (80.1)	26.5 (79.7)	20.0 (68.0)	12.6 (54.7)	3.7 (38.7)	−3.3 (26.1)	11.4 (52.5)
Daily mean °C (°F)	−10.8 (12.6)	−8.3 (17.1)	−2.8 (27.0)	4.7 (40.5)	10.7 (51.3)	15.6 (60.1)	18.5 (65.3)	17.9 (64.2)	11.5 (52.7)	4.7 (40.5)	−3.1 (26.4)	−9.8 (14.4)	4.1 (39.4)
Mean daily minimum °C (°F)	−17.1 (1.2)	−14.9 (5.2)	−9.1 (15.6)	−2.9 (26.8)	3.2 (37.8)	8.3 (46.9)	10.3 (50.5)	9.2 (48.6)	3.0 (37.4)	−3.3 (26.1)	−10.0 (14.0)	−16.2 (2.8)	−3.3 (26.1)
Record low °C (°F)	−49.4 (−56.9)	−47.8 (−54.0)	−40.6 (−41.1)	−28.3 (−18.9)	−14.4 (6.1)	−6.7 (19.9)	−0.6 (30.9)	−3.9 (25.0)	−13.9 (7.0)	−30.0 (−22.0)	−36.7 (−34.1)	−46.7 (−52.1)	−49.4 (−56.9)
Average precipitation mm (inches)	14.8 (0.58)	9.1 (0.36)	17.5 (0.69)	19.3 (0.76)	52.5 (2.07)	74.1 (2.92)	56.5 (2.22)	33.5 (1.32)	30.7 (1.21)	17.7 (0.70)	14.6 (0.57)	12.2 (0.48)	352.5 (13.88)
Average rainfall mm (inches)	0.2 (0.01)	0.3 (0.01)	3.4 (0.13)	13.5 (0.53)	48.0 (1.89)	74.1 (2.92)	56.5 (2.22)	33.5 (1.32)	30.0 (1.18)	12.2 (0.48)	3.0 (0.12)	1.0 (0.04)	262 (10.3)
Average snowfall cm (inches)	14.6 (5.7)	8.8 (3.5)	14.1 (5.6)	5.8 (2.3)	4.8 (1.9)	0.0 (0.0)	0.0 (0.0)	0.0 (0.0)	0.7 (0.3)	5.5 (2.2)	11.8 (4.6)	11.3 (4.4)	77.3 (30.4)
Source: Environment Canada

== Demographics ==
Federal census population history
Year	Pop.	±%
1931	133	—
1936	147	+10.5%
1941	306	+108.2%
1946	301	−1.6%
1951	357	+18.6%
1956	383	+7.3%
1961	443	+15.7%
1966	385	−13.1%
1971	307	−20.3%
1976	253	−17.6%
1981	238	−5.9%
1986	204	−14.3%
1991	219	+7.4%
1996	157	−28.3%
2001	134	−14.6%
2006	137	+2.2%
2011	130	−5.1%
2016	126	−3.1%
2021	120	−4.8%
Source: Statistics Canada

In the 2021 Census of Population conducted by Statistics Canada, Val Marie had a population of 120 living in 64 of its 86 total private dwellings, a change of −4.8% from its 2016 population of 126. With a land area of 0.43 km^{2} (0.17 sq mi), it had a population density of 279.1/km^{2} (722.8/sq mi) in 2021.

In the 2016 Census of Population, the Village of Val Marie recorded a population of 126 living in 66 of its 80 total private dwellings, a −3.2% change from its 2011 population of 130. With a land area of 0.42 km^{2} (0.16 sq mi), it had a population density of 300.0/km^{2} (777.0/sq mi) in 2016.

The village recorded its largest population in 1961, when 443 people lived in Val Marie.

== Culture ==
Val Marie holds many annual events such as the Val Marie Bob Larson Memorial Rodeo, Lion's Senior's Supper, Lion's Sports Day, and a Canada Day parade, among others. Between the Val Marie Hotel, Prairie Wind & Silver Sage (the museum), theatre/hall, and arena, there are many events taking place weekly.

=== Heritage buildings ===
Val Marie is home to two municipally declared heritage buildings.

1. The Val Marie School. It is an old two-room schoolhouse made of red brick that was used from 1927–1985. The building is now maintained by Prairie Wind & Silver Sage — Friends of Grasslands National Park (PWSS). It is used as a seasonal museum, gift shop, coffee shop, and art gallery. A self-guided Val Marie walking tour is available through PWSS.
2. The Val Marie Elevator. Built in 1927, this elevator has wood panelling and cedar shingles. A local community group has been actively fundraising for its restoration with the anticipation of turning it into a museum. The outside has been completely restored, and work has commenced on the interior.

=== Tourism ===
In 2018, Grasslands National Park had almost 20,000 visitors through the park, in cooperation with the Canada 150 Marketing campaign. The number of tourists that come to Val Marie for annual events or to use the Port of Monchy Border Crossing is unknown.

The Village of Val Marie has partnered with the Cypress Hills Destination Area to promote Val Marie as a tourist destination.

Services in the community include a gas station, a hotel/bar, a museum (which also includes a gift shop, coffee shop and art gallery), a café, a campground, art galleries, bed and breakfasts, an old convent that has been converted to an inn, a movie theatre, yoga studio, a hockey arena and curling rink, a library, a community centre, a town square, and a community-owned grocery store. Some services are only available seasonally. Val Marie is also home to a school (kindergarten to grade 12) and the Val Marie Early Learning Centre which offers preschool programming. A basic life support ambulance services the region. The nearest full-service centre is the city of Swift Current, located 120 kilometres (75 mi) north on Highway 4.

== Notable people ==
- Oneil Carlier — Alberta Minister of Agriculture, 2015–2019
- Will James — Quebec cowboy novelist/artist; lived in area 1910–1913
- Ron Miksha — author; geophysicist; lived in Val Marie 1976–1987
- Bryan Trottier — former NHL player/coach, seven-time Stanley Cup champion, Hockey Hall of Fame
- Rocky Trottier — former NHL player

== See also ==
- List of villages in Saskatchewan
- List of francophone communities in Saskatchewan
