= Killdeer, Saskatchewan =

Community in Saskatchewan, Canada

Killdeer
- Locality
- Location within Saskatchewan Location within Canada
- Coordinates: 49°06′27″N 106°21′45″W
- Country: Canada
- Province: Saskatchewan
- Census division: 3
- Rural municipality: Old Post No. 43
- Time zone: CST
- Area code: 306
- Highways: Hwy 2, Hwy 18

Killdeer is an unincorporated community in the Rural Municipality of Old Post No. 43, Saskatchewan, Canada. The locality is located near the intersection of Highway 2 and Highway 18 about 270 kilometres (170 mi) southwest of Regina and 13 kilometres (8.1 mi) north of the Canada–United States border.

== Geography ==
Killdeer is located on the southern slopes of Wood Mountain Hills and just east of the Killdeer Badlands, which are also known as the Rock Creek Badlands.

== See also ==
- List of communities in Saskatchewan
