= Beaubier, Saskatchewan =

Community in Saskatchewan, Canada

Coordinates: 49°07′36″N 104°04′46″W

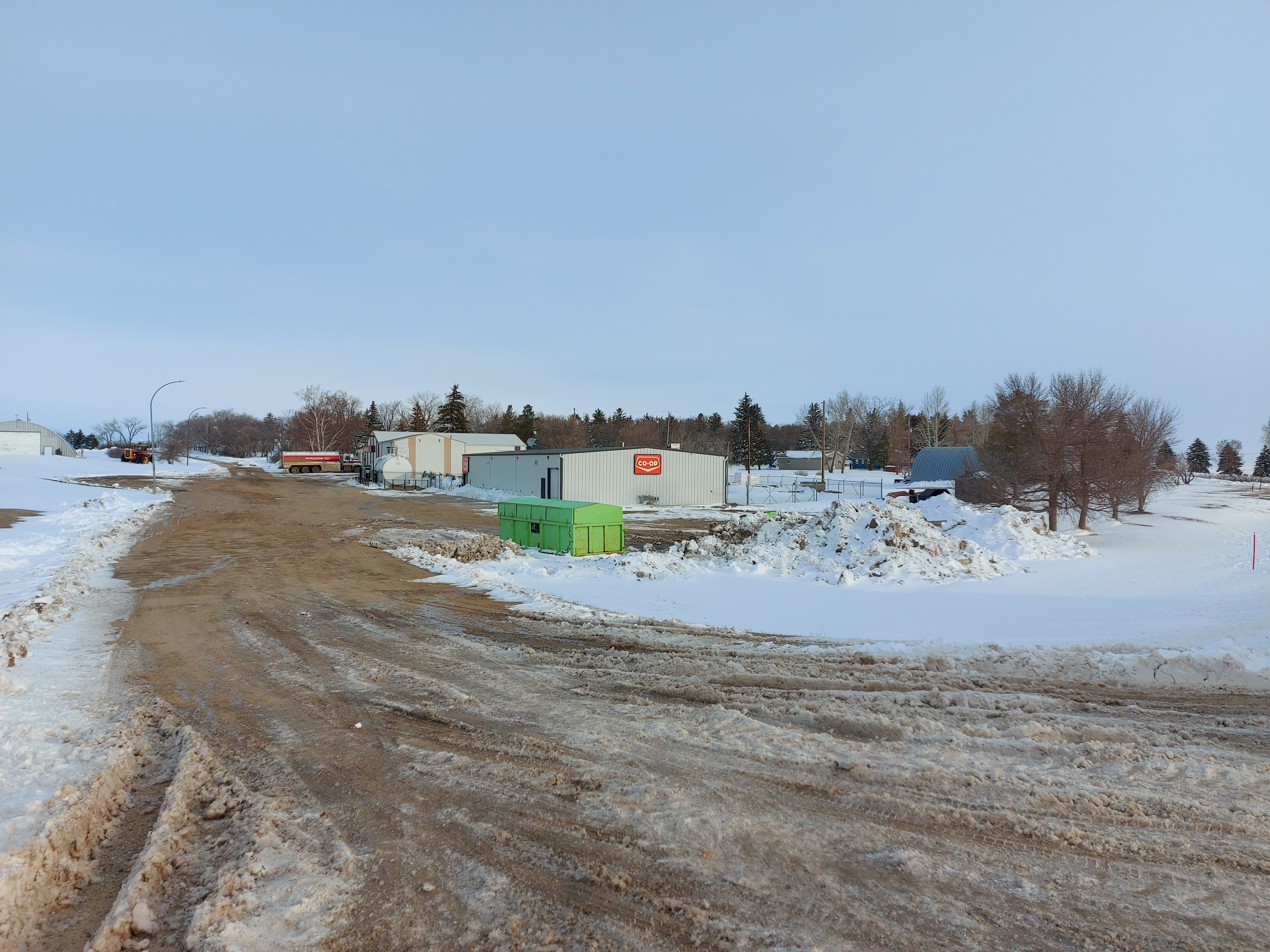
Railway Avenue, Beaubier

Beaubier is a hamlet in the Canadian province of Saskatchewan. Access is from Highway 707.

The community was renamed Beaubier to honour a young schoolteacher who died nursing the ill during the 1918 Spanish flu pandemic.

== Demographics ==
In the 2021 Census of Population conducted by Statistics Canada, Beaubier had a population of 20 living in 11 of its 14 total private dwellings, a change of -33.3% from its 2016 population of 30. With a land area of 0.08 km^{2} (0.031 sq mi), it had a population density of 250.0/km^{2} (647.5/sq mi) in 2021.

== See also ==
- List of communities in Saskatchewan
- List of hamlets in Saskatchewan
